= List of township-level divisions of Sichuan =

Location of Sichuan in China.

This is a list of township-level divisions in the province of Sichuan, People's Republic of China (PRC).

== Bazhong ==
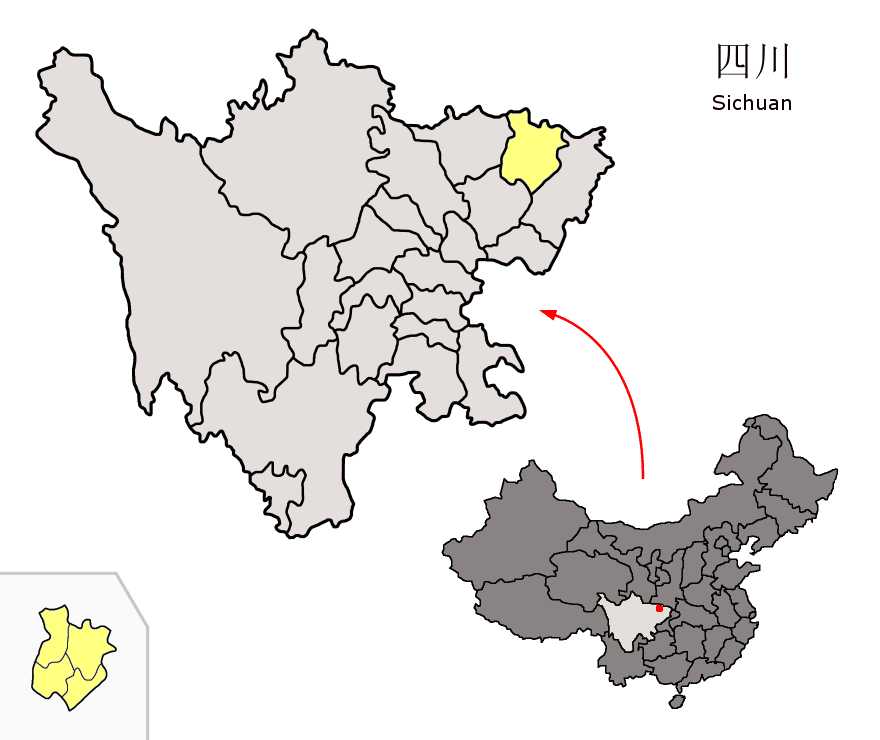
Location of Bazhong and its county-level areas in Sichuan.

=== Bazhou District ===
- Eight townships: Baimiao (白庙乡), Dahe (大和乡) Guandu (关渡乡), Huaxi (花溪乡), Jinbei (金碑乡), Lingyun (凌云乡), Longbei (龙背乡), Yangfeng (羊凤乡)
- Fifteen towns: Daluo (大罗镇), Damaoping (巴州镇), Dingshan (鼎山镇), Fengxi (凤溪镇), Guanghui (光辉镇), Huacheng (化成镇), Liangyong (梁永镇), Pingliang (平梁镇), Qingjiang (清江镇), Sanjiang (三江镇), Shuiningsi (水宁寺镇), Siling (寺岭镇), Zaolin (枣林镇), Zengkou (曾口镇), Zitongmiao (梓桐庙镇)
- Five subdistricts: Dongcheng (东城街道), Huifeng (回风街道), Jiangbei (江北街道), Xicheng (西城街道), Xingwen (兴文街道)

=== Enyang District ===
- Six townships: Sanxing (三星乡), Shicheng (石城乡), Wan'an (万安乡), Wufeng (舞凤乡), Yujing (玉井乡), Yixing (玉井乡)
- Eighteen towns: Yinjia (尹家镇), Chaba (茶坝镇), Guangong (关公镇), Guanyinjing (观音井镇), Huacong (花丛镇), Jiu (九镇), Liulin (柳林镇), Mingyang (恩阳镇), Qingmu (青木镇), Qunle (群乐镇), Sanhechang (观音井镇), Sanhui (三汇镇), Shangbamiao (上八庙镇), Shuangsheng (双胜镇), Xiabamiao (下八庙镇), Xinglong (兴隆镇), Yushan (玉山镇), Yuxi (渔溪镇)

=== Nanjiang County ===
- Eighteen townships: Beiji (北极乡), Dongyu (东峪镇), Fujia (傅家乡), Guantian (关田乡), Hongsi (红四乡), Hongyan (红岩乡), Huitan (汇滩乡), Liuba (流坝乡), Liuwan (柳湾乡), Nanjiang (南江镇), Pinggang (平岗乡), Shangliang (上两乡), Shenmen (神门乡), Shuanggui (双桂乡), Tuanjie (团结乡), Yanshan (燕山乡), Zhaipo (寨坡乡), Zhugong (朱公乡)
- Thirty towns: Bamiao (八庙镇), Changchi (长赤镇), Chixi (赤溪镇), Dahe (大河镇), Fengyi (凤仪镇), Ganchang (赶场镇), Gaoqiao (高桥镇), Gaota (高塔镇), Guanba (关坝镇), Guangwushan (光雾山镇), Guanlu (关路镇), Guanmen (关门镇), Guimin (贵民镇), Heping (和平镇), Hongguang (红光镇), Huojia (侯家镇), Leba (乐坝镇), Pinghe (坪河镇), Qiaoting (桥亭镇), Renhe (仁和镇), Shahe (沙河镇), Shitan (石滩镇), Shuangliu (双流镇), Tianchi (天池镇), Xialiang (下两镇), Xingma (兴马镇), Yangba (杨坝镇), Yuantan (元潭镇), Yunding (云顶镇), Zhengshi (正直镇)
- One subdistrict: Jizhou (集州街道)

=== Pingchang County ===
- Nine townships: Fushen (福申乡), Heishui (黑水乡), Jiepai (界牌乡), Liumen (六门乡), Ma'an (马鞍乡), Nanfeng (南风乡), Shaunglu (双鹿乡), Shiya (石牙乡), Xishen (西深乡)
- Thirty-five towns: Baiyi (白衣镇), Banmiao (板庙镇), Bishan (笔山镇), Dazhai (大寨镇), Desheng (得胜镇), Fenbi (粉壁镇), Folou (佛楼镇), Gaofeng (高峰镇), Hanshui (涵水镇), Jiangkiakou (江家口镇), Lancao (兰草镇), Lingshan (灵山镇), Longgang (龙岗镇), Luming (鹿鸣镇), Nilong (泥龙镇), Qingfeng (青凤镇), Qingyun (青云镇), Qiujia (邱家镇), Sanshi'er Liang (三十二梁镇), Si'an (澌岸镇), Sima (驷马镇), Sitan (澌滩镇), Tanxi (坦溪镇), Tuxing (土兴镇), Tuya (土垭镇), Wangjing (望京镇), Wumu (五木镇), Xiangtan (响滩镇), Xixing (西兴镇), Yankou (岩口镇), Yuanshan (元山镇), Yuanshi (元石镇), Yuejia (岳家镇), Yuntai (云台镇), Zhenlong (镇龙镇)
- One subdistrict: Jiangkou (江口街道)

=== Tongjiang County ===
- Nineteen townships: Bandeng (板凳乡), Caochi (草池乡), Daxing (大兴乡), Dongshan (东山乡), Dongxi (董溪乡), Huilin (回林乡), Jiuceng (九层乡), Sanhe (三合乡), Shaping (沙坪乡), Shengli (胜利乡), Shuangquan (双泉乡), Sibo (澌波乡), Songxi (松溪乡), Tiechang (铁厂乡), Wenfeng (文峰乡), Wensheng (文胜乡), Yuntan (云昙乡), Zhibao (芝苞乡), Zhuyuan (朱元乡)
- Thirty towns: Banqiaokou (板桥口镇), Changge (唱歌镇), Changping (长坪镇), Chenhe (陈河镇), Chunzai (春在镇), Fuyang (涪阳镇), Guangna (广纳镇), Hongkou (洪口镇), Huoju (火炬镇), Kongshan (空山镇), Lianghekou (两河口镇), Longfengchang (龙凤场镇), Maoyu (毛浴镇), Mashi (麻石镇), Minsheng (民胜镇), Nixi (泥溪镇), Nuojiang (诺江镇), Nuoshuihe (诺水河镇), Qingyu (青峪镇), Sanxi (三溪镇), Shaxi (沙溪镇), Tiefo (铁佛镇), Tiexi (铁溪镇), Washi (瓦室镇), Xinchang (新场镇), Xinglong (兴隆镇), Yangbai (杨柏镇), Yanxi (烟溪镇), Yong'an (永安镇), Zhicheng (至诚镇)

== Chengdu ==
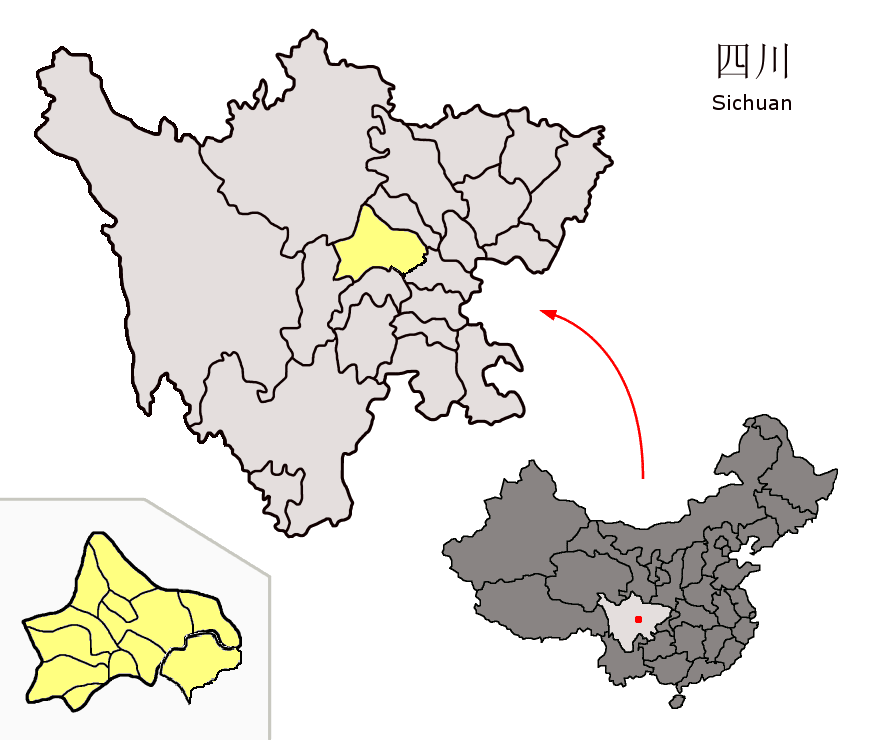
Location of Chengdu and its county-level areas in Sichuan.

=== Chenghua District ===
- Fourteen subdistricts: Baohe (保和街道), Erxianqiao (二仙桥街道), Fuqinglu (府青路街道), Jianshelu (建设路街道), Longtan (龙潭街道), Mengzhuiwan (猛追湾街道), Qinglong (青龙街道), Shengdeng (圣灯街道), Shuangqiaozi (双桥子街道), Shuangshuinian (双水碾街道), Taoxilu (桃蹊路街道), Tiaodenghe (跳蹬河街道), Wannianchang (万年场街道), Xinhonglu (新鸿路街道)

=== Chongzhou District ===
- Six townships: Gongyi (公议乡), Jiguanshan (鸡冠山乡), Jinjiang (锦江乡), Jixian (集贤乡), Jixie (济协乡), Liaoyuan (燎原乡)
- Fourteen towns: Baitou (白头镇), Chongping (崇平镇), Daoming (道明镇), Guansheng (观胜镇), Huaiyuan (怀远镇), Jiezi (街子镇), Liaojia (廖家镇), Longxing (隆兴镇), Qiquan (桤泉镇), Sanlang (三郎镇), Wangchang (王场镇), Wenjingjiang (文井江镇), Yuantong (元通镇), Zitong (梓潼镇)
- Five subdistricts: Chongyang (崇阳街道), Dahua (大划街道), Jiangyuan (江源街道), Sanjiang (三江街道), Yangma (羊马街道)

=== Dayi County ===
- Two townships: Jinxing (金星乡), Wushan (雾山乡)
- Fifteen towns: Anren (安仁镇), Caichang (蔡场镇), Chujiang (出江镇), Dongchang (董场镇), Hanchang (韩场镇), Heming (鹤鸣镇), Huashuiwan (花水湾镇), Sancha (三岔镇), Shang'an (上安镇), Sujia (苏家镇), Wangsi (王泗镇), Xieyuan (斜源镇), Xiling (西岭镇), Xinchang (新场镇), Yuelai (悦来镇)
- Three subdistricts: Jinyuan (晋原街道), Qingxia (青霞街道), Shaqu (沙渠街道)

=== Dujiangyan City ===
- Two townships: Hongkou (虹口乡), Xiang'e (向峨乡)
- Thirteen towns: Anlong (安龙镇), Chongyi (崇义镇), Cuiyuehu (翠月湖镇), Daguan (大观镇), Juyuan (聚源镇), Liujie (柳街镇), Longchi (龙池镇), Qingchengshan (青城山镇), Shiyang (石羊镇), Tianma (天马镇), Xujia (胥家镇), Zhongxing (中兴镇), Zipingpu (紫坪铺镇)
- Four subdistricts: Guankou (灌口街道), Puyang (蒲阳街道), Xingfu (幸福街道), Yutang (玉堂街道)

=== Jianyang ===
- Twenty towns: Dongjiageng (董家更镇), Gaoming (高明镇), Hailuo (海螺镇), Hefeng (鹤峰镇), Hongyuan (宏源镇), Jiangyuan (江源镇), Lujia (陆家镇), Pingwu (平武镇), Qinglong (青龙镇), Sanhe (三河镇), Sanxing (三星镇), Shizhong (市中镇), Tashui (塔水镇), Wumiao (无庙镇), Yangjia (杨家镇), Yongquan (涌泉镇), Yunlong (云龙镇), Zhejin (浙江镇), Zhuangxi (庄溪镇)
- Sixteen subdistricts: Caochi (草池街道), Chishui (赤水街道), Danjing (丹井街道), Dongxi (东溪街道), Futian (福田街道), Jiajia (嘉嘉街道), Jiancheng (建成街道), Pingquan (平泉街道), Sancha (三岔街道), Shehongba (射红坝街道), Shibangdeng (石邦灯街道) Shipan (石板街道), Shiqiao (市桥街道), Xinshi (新市街道), Yangma (养马街道), Yucheng (禹城街道)

=== Jinniu District ===
- Fifteen subdistricts: Chadianzi (茶店子街道), Fenghuangshan (凤凰山街道), Fuqin (抚琴街道), Hehuachi (荷花池街道), Huangzhong (黄中街道), Jinquan (金泉街道), Jiulidi (九里堤街道), Renmin Beilu (人民北路街道), Shaheyuan (沙河源街道), Simaqiao (驷马桥街道), Tianhuizhen (天回镇街道), Wukuaishi (五块石街道), Xi'anlu (西安路街道), Xihua (西华街道), Yingmenkou (营门口街道)

=== Jinjiang District ===
- Sixteen subdistricts: Chenglonglu (成龙路街道), Chunxilu (春熙路街道), Dongguang (东光街道), Duyuanjie (督院街街道), Hejiangting (合江亭街道), Lianxin (莲新街道), Liujiang (柳江街道), Longzhoulu (龙舟路街道), Niushikou (牛市口街道), Sansheng (三圣街道), Shahe (沙河街道), Shizishan (狮子山街道), Shuangguilu (双桂路街道), Shuijingfang (水井坊街道), Yanshikou (盐市口街道)

=== Jintang County ===
- One township: Pingqiao (平桥乡)
- Fourteen towns: Fuxing (福兴镇), Guangxing (广兴镇), Jinlong (金龙镇), Longsheng (隆盛镇), Qingjiang (清江镇), Sanxing (三星镇), Sanxi (三溪镇), Tuqiao (土桥镇), Wufeng (五凤镇), Youxin (又新镇), Yunhe (云合镇), Zhaojia (赵家镇), Zhuanlong (转龙镇), Zhugao (竹篙镇)
- Six subdistricts: Baiguo (白果街道), Gaoban (高板街道), Guancang (官仓街道), Huaikou (淮口街道), Qixian (栖贤街道), Zhao (赵镇街道)

=== Longquanyi District ===
- One township: Wanxing (万兴乡)
- Five towns: Chadian (茶店镇), Hong'an (洪安镇), Huangtu (黄土镇), Luodai (洛带镇), Shanquan (山泉镇)
- Six subdistricts: Baihe (柏合街道), Damian (大面街道), Longquan (龙泉街道), Shiling (十陵街道), Tong'an (同安街道), Xihe (西河街道)

=== Pengzhou ===
- Fourteen towns: Aoping (敖平镇), Bailu (白鹿镇), Cifeng (磁峰镇), Danjingshan (丹景山镇), Gexianshan (葛仙山镇), Guihua (桂花镇), Hongyan (红岩镇), Jiuchi (九尺镇), Junle (军乐镇), Lichun (丽春镇), Longmenshan (龙门山镇), Shengping (升平镇), Tongji (通济镇), Xiaoyudong (小渔洞镇), Xinxing (新兴镇)
- Four subdistricts: Longfeng (隆丰街道), Mengyang (濛阳街道), Tianpeng (天彭街道), Zhihe (致和街道)

=== Pidu District ===
- Seven towns: Gucheng (古城镇), Huayuan (花园镇), Sandaoyan (三道堰镇), Tangchang (唐昌镇), Tangyuan (唐元镇), Xinminchang (新民场镇), You'ai (友爱镇)
- Eight subdistricts: Ande (安德街道), Anjing (安靖街道), Deyuan (德源街道), Hezuo (合作街道), Hongguang (红光街道), Pitong (郫筒街道), Tuanjie (团结街道), Xipu (犀浦街道)

=== Pujiang County ===
- Four townships: Baiyun (白云乡), Changqiu (长秋乡), Fuxing (复兴乡), Guangming (光明乡)
- Six towns: Chaoyanghu (朝阳湖镇), Chengjia (成佳镇), Datang (大塘镇), Daxing (大兴镇), Ganxi (甘溪镇), Xilai (西来镇)
- Two subdistricts: Heshan (鹤山街道), Shou'an (寿安街道)

=== Qingbaijiang District ===
- One township: Renhe (人和乡)
- Seven towns: Chengxiang (城厢镇), Fuhong (福洪镇), Longwang (龙王镇), Mimou (弥牟镇), Qingquan (清泉镇), Xiangfu (祥福镇), Yaodu (姚渡镇)
- Three subdistricts: Datong (大同街道), Dawan (大弯街道), Hongyang (红阳街道)

=== Qingyang District ===
- Fourteen subdistricts: Caoshije (草市街街道), Caotang (草堂街道), Dongpo (东坡街道), Funan (府南街道), Guanghua (光华街道), Huangtianba (黄田坝街道), Jinsha (金沙街道), Shaocheng (少城街道), Supo (苏坡街道), Taishenglu (太升路街道), Wangjiaguai (汪家拐街道), Wenjia (文家街道), Xinlu (新华西路街道), Xiyuhe (西御河街道)

=== Qionglai City ===
- Three townships: Chayuan (茶园乡), Daozuo (道佐乡), Youzha (油榨乡)
- Sixteen towns: Baolin (宝林镇), Datong (大同镇), Gaohe (高何镇), Huilong (回龙镇), Huojing (火井镇), Jiaguan (夹关镇), Linji (临济镇), Mouli (牟礼镇), Nanbaoshan (南宝山镇), Pingle (平乐镇), Qianjin (前进镇), Ranyi (冉义镇), Sangyuan (桑园镇), Shuikou (水口镇), Tiantaishan (天台山镇), Wolong (卧龙镇)
- Five subdistricts: Gaogeng (高埂街道), Guyi (固驿街道), Kongming (孔明街道), Linqiong (临邛街道), Yang'an (羊安街道)

=== Shuangliu District ===
- Eleven towns: Baisha (白沙镇), Dalin (大林镇), Gongxing (公兴镇), Hejiang (合江镇), Huanglongxi (黄龙溪镇), Huangshui (黄水镇), Jinqiao (金桥镇), Peng (彭镇), Sanxing (三星镇), Shengli (胜利镇), Yong'an (永安镇)
- Fourteen subdistricts: Dongsheng (东升街道), Huangjia (黄甲街道), Huayang (华阳街道), Jiancha (煎茶街道), Jitian (籍田街道), Jiujiang (九江街道), Taiping (太平街道), Wan'an (万安街道), Xihanggang (西航港街道), Xinglong (兴隆街道), Xinxing (新兴街道), Yongxing (永兴街道), Zhengxing (正兴街道), Zhonghe (中和街道)

=== Wenjiang District ===
- Three towns: Hesheng (和盛镇), Shou'an (寿安镇), Wanchun (万春镇)
- Six subdistricts: Gongping (公平街道), Jinma (金马街道), Liucheng (柳城街道), Tianfu (天府街道), Yongning (永宁街道), Yongquan (涌泉街道)

=== Wuhou District ===
- Sixteen subdistricts: Cujin (簇锦街道), Cuqiao (簇桥街道), Fangcaojie (芳草街街道), Guixi (桂溪街道), Hongpailou (红牌楼街道), Huaxing (华兴街道), Huoche Nanzhan (火车南站街道), Jiangxijie (浆洗街街道), Jinhuaqiao (金花桥街道), Jinyang (晋阳街道), Jitouqiao (机投桥街道), Shiyang (石羊场街道), Shuangnan (双南街道), Wangjianglu (望江路街道), Xiaojiahe (肖家河街道), Yulin (玉林街道)

=== Xindu District ===
- Seven towns: Juntun (军屯镇), Longqiao (龙桥镇), Majia (马家镇), Mulan (木兰镇), Qingliu (清流镇), Taixing (泰兴镇), Xinmin (新民镇)
- Six subdistricts: Banzhuyuan (斑竹园街道), Dafeng (大丰街道), Sanhe (三河街道), Shibantan (石板滩街道), Xindu (新都街道), Xinfan (新繁街道)

=== Xinjin District ===
- One township: Wenjing (文井乡)
- Seven towns: Anxi (安西镇), Dengshuang (邓双镇), Fangxing (方兴镇), Jinhua (金华镇), Xingyi (兴义镇), Xinping (新平镇), Yongshang (永商镇)
- Four subdistricts: Huaqiao (花桥街道), Huayuan (花源街道), Puxing (普兴街道), Wujin (五津街道)

== Dazhou ==
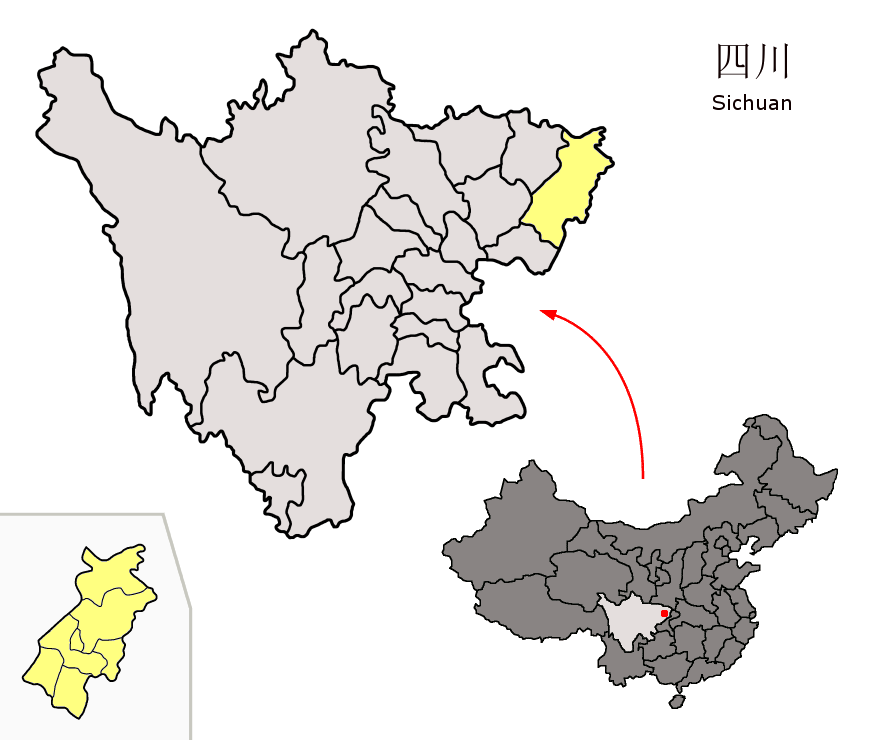
Location of Dazhou and its county-level areas in Sichuan.

=== Dachuan District ===
- Eighteen townships: Anren (安仁乡), Beigao (碑高乡), Caoxing (草兴乡), Chenjia (陈家乡), Dafeng (大风乡), Daorang (道让乡), Datan (大滩乡), Dongxing (东兴乡), Huahong (花红乡), Huangdu (黄都乡), Huangting (黄庭乡), Hulu (葫芦乡), Hurang (虎让乡), Jiangyang (江阳乡), Longhui (龙会乡), Luoche (洛车乡), Majia (马家乡), Micheng (米城乡), Mutou (木头乡), Muzi (木子乡), Shenjia (申家乡), Xianglong (香隆乡), Yanhe (沿河乡), Yaotang (幺塘乡), Yintie (银铁乡), Yongjin (永进乡)
- Twenty-seven towns: Baijie (百节镇), Baozi (堡子镇), Dashu (大树镇), Dayan (大堰镇), Dushi (渡市镇), Fushan (福善镇), Guancun (管村镇), Guanzi (罐子镇), Heshi (河市镇), Jingshi (景市镇), Jintan (金檀镇), Jinya (金垭镇), Jiuling (九岭镇), Maliu (麻柳镇), Nanwai (南外镇), Nanyue (南岳镇), Pingtan (平滩镇), Qiaowan (桥湾镇), Shiqiao (石桥镇), Shiti (石梯镇), Shuangmiao (双庙镇), Tanmu (潭母镇), Tingzi (亭子镇), Wanjia (万家镇), Wusi (五四镇), Zhaogu (赵固镇), Zhaojia (赵家镇)
- Two subdistricts: Binlang (斌郎街道), Shiban (石板街道)

=== Dazhu County ===
- Twenty-one townships: Anji (安吉乡), Badu (八渡乡), Baijia (柏家乡), Chaoyang (朝阳乡), Chengxi (城西乡), Chuanzhu (川主乡), Huangjia (黄家乡), Huangtan (黄滩乡), Jinji (金鸡乡), Lianyin (莲印乡), Lijia (李家乡), Paifang (牌坊乡), Pubao (蒲包乡), Shenhe (神合乡), Shuangxi (双溪乡), Xinsheng (新生乡), Yangtong (杨通乡), Yaoshi (姚市乡), Zhonghe (中和乡), Zhubei (竹北乡)
- Twenty-eight towns: Baiba (白坝镇), Bailin (柏林镇), Erlang (二郎镇), Gaoming (高明镇), Gaoxue (高穴镇), Guanyin (观音镇), Mama (妈妈镇), Miaoba (庙坝镇), Oujia (欧家镇), Qinghe (清河镇), Qingshui (清水镇), Renhe (人和镇), Shihe (石河镇), Shiqiaopu (石桥铺镇), Shizi (石子镇), Shuanggong (双拱镇), Sihe (四合镇), Tiancheng (天城镇), Tongjia (童家镇), Tuanba (团坝镇), Wenxing (文星镇), Wumu (乌木镇), Yangjia (杨家镇), Yongsheng (永胜镇), Yuehua (月华镇), Zhangjia (张家镇), Zhonghua (中华镇), Zhoujia (周家镇)
- Two subdistricts: Dongliu (大竹县), Zhuyang (竹阳街道)

=== Kaijiang County ===
- Seven townships: Changtian (长田乡), Jing'an (靖安乡), Meijia (梅家乡), Qilong (骑龙乡), Shabachang (沙坝场乡), Xinjie (新街乡), Xintai (新太乡)
- Thirteen towns: Bamiao (八庙镇), Baoshi (宝石镇), Changling (长岭镇), Gantang (甘棠镇), Guangfu (广福镇), Huilong (回龙镇), Jiangzhi (讲治镇), Lingyan (灵岩镇), Pu'an (普安镇), Renshi (任市镇), Tianshi (天师镇), Xinning (新宁镇), Yongxing (永兴镇)

=== Qu County ===
- Twenty-five townships: Anbei (安北乡), Baishui (柏水乡), Baitu (白兔乡), Bao'en (报恩乡), Caihe (蔡和乡), Dayi (大义乡), Gongshi (拱市乡), Hedong (河东乡), Hele (和乐乡), Huibei (汇北乡), Huidong (汇东乡), Huinan (汇南乡), Jiahe (嘉禾乡), Jaguang (巨光乡), Ping'an (平安乡), Pingxi (屏西乡), Qianfo (千佛乡), Qingshen (青神乡), Qingsi (青丝乡), Shehong (射洪乡), Shuangtu (双土乡), Songjia (宋家乡), Wangjiang (望江乡), Xixi (锡溪乡), Yihe (义和乡)
- Thirty-two towns: Banqiao (板桥镇), Baocheng (宝城镇), Dingyuan (定远镇), Dong'an (东安镇), Fengle (丰乐镇), Guifu (贵福镇), Heli (合力镇), Jingbian (静边镇), Juandong (卷硐镇), Langya (琅琊镇), Lidu (李渡镇), Lifu (李馥镇), Linba (临巴镇), Liuxi (流溪镇), Longfeng (龙凤镇), Longtan (龙潭镇), Qinglong (青龙镇), Qingxichang (清溪场镇), Qubei (渠北镇), Sanban (三板镇), Sanhui (三汇镇), Shuikou (水口镇), Tuxi (土溪镇), Wangxi (望溪镇), Wanshou (万寿镇), Wenchong (文崇镇), Xiandu (鲜渡镇), Xinshi (新市镇), Yanfeng (岩峰镇), Yongxing (涌兴镇), Youqing (有庆镇), Zhongtan (中滩镇)
- Three subdistricts: Qujiang (渠江街道), Qunan (渠南街道), Tianxing (天星街道)

=== Tongchuan District ===
- Four townships: Anyun (安云乡), Longtan (龙滩乡), Mengshuang (檬双乡), Xincun (新村乡)
- Fourteen towns: Beimiao (碑庙镇), Beishan (北山镇), Dongyue (东岳镇), Fuxing (复兴镇), Jiangling (江陵镇), Jinshi (金石镇), Luojiang (罗江镇), Panshi (磐石镇), Pujia (蒲家镇), Qingning (青宁镇), Shuanglong (双龙镇), Weixing (伟兴镇), Xiwai (凤西街道), Zitong (梓桐镇)
- Four subdistricts: Chaoyang (朝阳街道), Dongcheng (东城街道), Fengbei (凤北街道), Xicheng (西城街道)

=== Wanyuan ===
- Twenty-nine townships: Baiyang (白羊乡), Caojia (曹家乡), Changshi (长石乡), Chaya (茶垭乡), Fengtong (蜂桶乡), Guanba (罐坝乡), Hongqiao (虹桥乡), Hua'e (花萼乡), Hualou (花楼乡), Kangle (康乐乡), Lishu (梨树乡), Liuhuang (柳黄乡), Miaopo (庙坡乡), Miaoya (庙垭乡), Mioazi (庙子乡), Piwo (皮窝乡), Qinhe (秦河乡), Shiren (石人乡), Siluo (丝罗乡), Xikou (溪口乡), Xindian (新店乡), Yantang (堰塘乡), Yudai (玉带乡), Zhaotang (昭塘乡), Zengjia (曾家乡), Zhongping (中坪乡), Zhongting (钟亭乡), Zizi (紫溪乡)
- Twenty-five towns: Baiguo (白果镇), Baisha (白沙镇), Batai (八台镇), Caoba (草坝镇), Changba (长坝镇), Dasha (大沙镇), Dazhu (大竹镇), Gandu (官渡镇), Gujun (固军镇), Heibaoshan (黑宝山镇), Hekou (河口镇), Huangzhong (黄钟镇), Jingxi (井溪镇), Jiuyuan (旧院镇), Luowen (罗文镇), Qinghua (青花镇), Shatan (沙滩镇), Shitang (石塘镇), Shiwo (石窝镇), Taiping (太平镇), Tiekuang (铁矿镇), Weijia (魏家镇), Yingbei (鹰背镇), Yongning (永宁镇), Zhuyu (竹峪镇)

=== Xuanhan County ===
- Twenty-two townships: Aikou (爱口乡), Donglin (东林乡), Dukou (渡口土家族乡), Fenglin (凤林乡), Fengming (凤鸣乡), Guanshan (观山乡), Hauchi (花池乡), Huangshi (黄石乡), Laojun (老君乡), Liangfeng (凉风乡), Longquan (龙泉土家族乡), Madu (马都乡), Mingyue (明月乡), Qibei (漆碑乡), Qingyun (青云乡), Qishu (漆树土家族乡), Sandun (三墩土家族乡), Sanhe (三河乡), Shitie (石铁乡), Tianbao (天宝乡), Tiantai (天台乡)
- Thirty-four towns: Baima (白马镇), Baishu (柏树镇), Bajiao (芭蕉镇), Chahe (茶河镇), Changxi (厂溪镇), Dacheng (大成镇), Dongxiang (东乡镇), Fankuai (樊哙镇), Fengcheng (峰城镇), Honfeng (红峰镇), Hongling (红岭镇), Huajing (华景镇), Huangjin (黄金镇), Hujia (胡家镇), Juntang (君塘镇), Liuchi (柳池镇), Maduguan (马渡关镇), Maoba (毛坝镇), Miao'an (庙安镇), Nanba (南坝镇), Nanping (南坪镇), Puguang (普光镇), Qili (七里镇), Qingxi (清溪镇), Shuangxia (上峡镇), Shuanghe (双河镇), Tahe (塔河镇), Taohua (桃花镇), Tiansheng (天生镇), Tuhuang (土黄镇), Tuzhu (土主镇), Wubao (五宝镇), Xiaba (下八镇), Xinhua (新华镇)

== Deyang ==
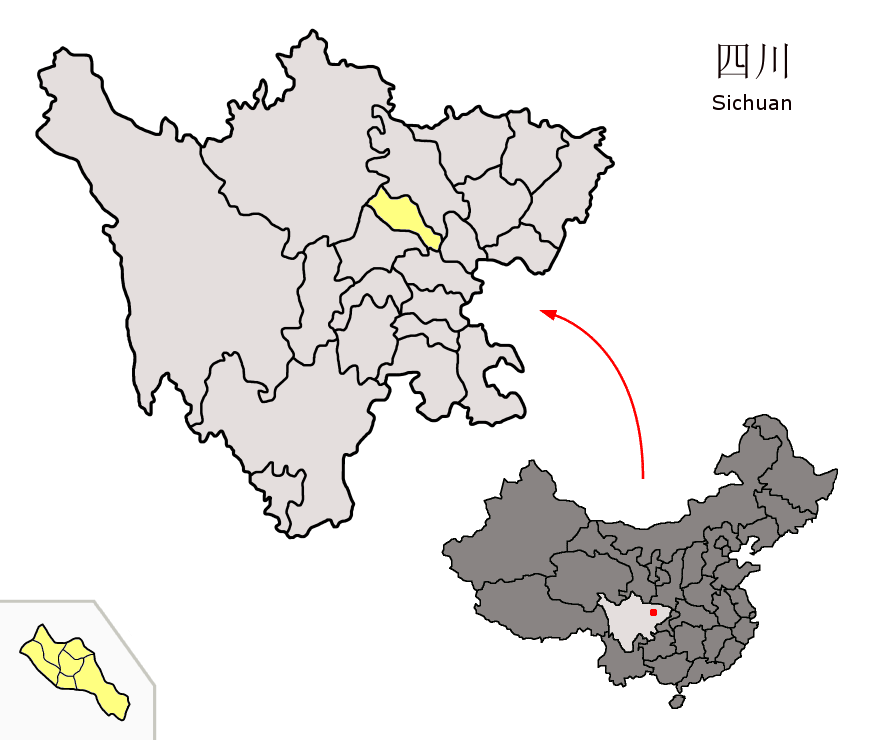
Location of Deyang and its county-level areas in Sichuan.

=== Guanghan ===
- Seventeen towns: Gaoping (高坪镇), Hexing (和兴镇), Jinlun (金轮镇), Jinyu (金鱼镇), Lianshan (连山镇), Nanfeng (南丰镇), Nanxing (南兴镇), Sanshui (三水镇), Sanxingdui (三星堆镇), Songlin (松林镇), Xianyang (向阳镇), Xiaohan (小汉镇), Xigao (西高镇), Xinglong (兴隆镇), Xinping (新平镇), Xiwai (西外镇)
- Three subdistricts: Jinyan (金雁街道), Luocheng (雒城街道), Xinfeng (新丰街道)

=== Jingyang District ===
- Eight towns: Bailong (柏隆镇), Dexin (德新镇), Hexin (和新镇), Huangxu (黄许镇), Shuangdong (双东镇), Xiaoquan (孝泉镇), Xinzhong (新中镇), Yangjia (扬嘉镇)
- Nine subdistricts: Bajiaojing (八角井街道), Chengbei (城北街道), Chengnan (城南街道), Donghu (东湖街道), Gongnong (工农街道), Jingdong (旌东街道), Jingyang (旌阳街道), Tianyuan (天元街道), Xiaogan (孝感街道)

=== Luojiang District ===
- Ten towns: Baimaguan (白马关镇), Diaoyuan (调元镇), Huijue (慧觉镇), Jinshan (金山镇), Lueping (略坪镇), Panlong (盘龙镇), Wan'an (万安镇), Xinsheng (新盛镇), Yanjia (鄢家镇) Yuying (育英镇)

=== Mianzhu ===
- One township: Tianchi (天池乡)
- Nineteen towns: Banqiao (板桥镇), Dongbei (东北镇), Fuxin (富新镇), Gongxing (拱星镇), Guangji (广济镇), Hanwang (汉旺镇), Jinhua (金花镇), Jiulong (九龙镇), Mianyuan (绵远镇), Qingping (清平镇), Qitian (齐田镇), Shidi (什地镇), Tumen (麓棠镇), Xiaode (孝德镇), Xinan (西南镇), Xinglong (兴隆镇), Xinshi (新市镇), Yuquan (玉泉镇), Zundao (遵道镇)
- Two subdistricts: Jiannan (剑南街道), Ziyan (紫岩街道)

=== Shifang ===
- Fourteen towns: Bingchuan (冰川镇), Hefeng (禾丰镇), Hongbai (红白镇), Huilan (回澜镇), Jiandi (湔氐镇), Luoshi (洛水镇), Majing (马井镇), Mazu (马祖镇), Nanquan (南泉镇), Shigu (师古镇), Shuangsheng (双盛镇), Yinfeng (隐丰镇), Yinghua (蓥华镇), Yuanshi (元石镇)
- Two subdistricts: Fangting (方亭街道), Zaojiao (皂角街道)

=== Zhongjiang County ===
- Sixteen townships: Baiguo (白果乡), Baishu (柏树乡), Gaodian (高店乡), Gudian (古店乡), Hexing (合兴乡), Minzhu (民主乡), Qinghe (清河乡), Qingshi (青市乡), Shilong (石龙乡), Shiquan (石泉乡), Shisun (石笋乡), Taiping (太平乡), Tongshan (通山乡), Wadian (瓦店乡), Yongfeng (永丰乡), Yuanxing (元兴乡)
- Twenty-nine towns: Cangshan (仓山镇), Dongbei (东北镇), Fengdian (冯店镇), Fuxing (富兴镇), Guangfu (广福镇), Huanglu (黄鹿镇), Huilong (回龙镇), Huilong (会龙镇), Jiexing (杰兴镇), Jifeng (集凤镇), Jiguang (继光镇), Jijin (积金镇), Jiqing (辑庆镇), Kaijiang (凯江镇), Lianhe (联合镇), Longtai (龙台镇), Nanhua (南华镇), Nanshan (南山镇), Puxing (普兴镇), Shuanglong (双龙镇), Tai'an (太安镇), Tongji (通济镇), Wanfu (万福镇), Xinglong (兴隆镇), Yong'an (永安镇), Yongtai (永太镇), Yongxing (永兴镇), Yuelai (悦来镇), Yuxing (玉兴镇)

== Garzê Tibetan Autonomous Prefecture ==
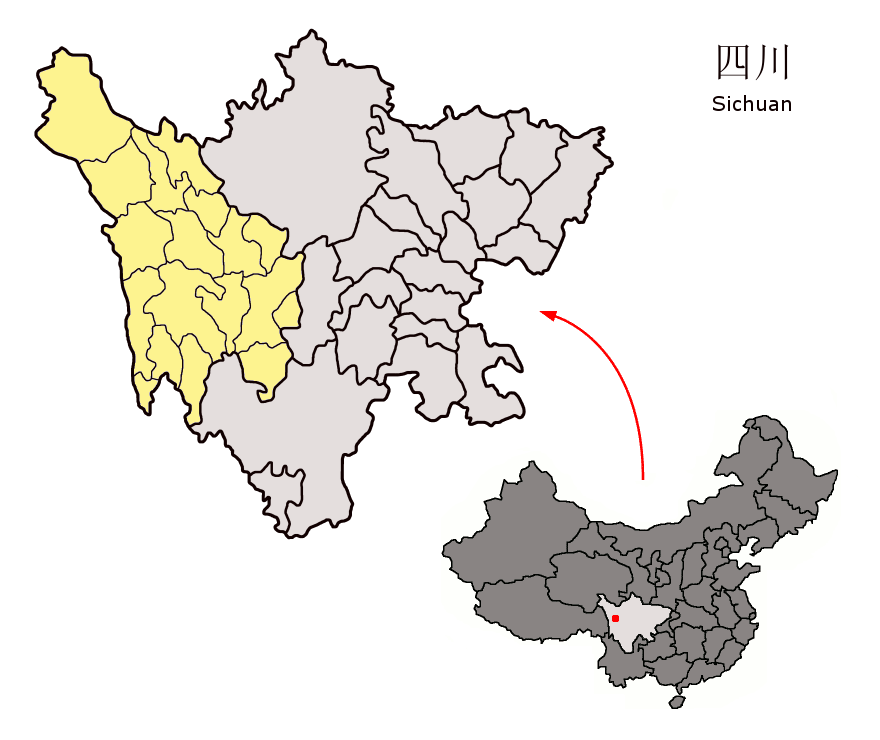
Location of Garzê Tibetan Autonomous Prefecture and its county-level areas in Sichuan.

=== Baiyü County ===
- Thirteen townships: Anzi (安孜乡), Denglong (登龙乡), Jinsha (金沙乡), Liaoxi (辽西乡), Maqiong (麻邛乡), Marong (麻绒乡), Nata (纳塔乡), Rejia (热加乡), Ronggai (绒盖乡), Shama (沙马乡), Shanyan (山岩乡), Zengke (赠科乡), Zhangdu (章都乡)
- Four towns: Acha (阿察镇), Gaiyu (盖玉镇), Hepo (河坡镇), Jianshe (建设镇)

=== Batang County ===
- Fourteen townships: Bogexi (波戈溪乡), Bomi (波密乡), Chaluo (茶洛乡), Changbo (昌波乡), Dangba (党巴乡), Deda (德达乡), Lawa (拉哇乡), Lieyi (列衣乡), Moduo (莫多乡), Songduo (松多乡), Suwalong (苏哇龙乡), Yarigong (亚日贡乡), Zhongxinrong (中心绒乡), Zhubalong (竹巴龙乡)
- Five towns: Cuola (措拉镇), Diwu (地巫镇), Jiaying (甲英镇), Xiaqiong (夏邛镇), Zhongzan (中咱镇)

=== Danba County ===
- Eight townships: Bawang (巴旺乡), Bian'er (边儿乡), Niexia (聂呷乡), Shuizi (水子乡), Suopo (梭坡乡), Taipingqiao (太平桥乡), Yuezha (岳扎乡), Zhonglu (中路乡)
- Seven towns: Badi (巴底镇), Banshanmen (半扇门镇), Dandong (丹东镇), Donggu (东谷镇), Geshizha (革什扎镇), Gezong (格宗镇), Zhanggu (章谷镇)

=== Daocheng County ===
- Eleven townships: Banghe (傍河乡), Chitu (赤土乡), Dengpo (邓坡乡), Eyatong (俄牙同乡) Geka (各卡乡), Jiga (吉呷乡), Julong (巨龙乡), Mengzi (蒙自乡), Mula (木拉乡), Sela (色拉乡), Shengmu (省母乡)
- Three towns: Jinzhu (金珠镇), Sangdui (桑堆镇), Xianggelila (香格里拉镇)

=== Dawu County ===
- Sixteen townships: Geka (葛卡乡), Gexi (格西乡), Hongding (红顶乡), Jiasikong (甲斯孔乡), Jiazong (家宗乡), Kongse (孔色乡), Longdeng (龙灯乡), Mazi (麻孜乡), Muru (木茹乡), Qimei (七美乡), Seka (色卡乡), Shachong (沙冲乡), Weita (伟塔乡), Xiatuo (下拖乡), Yin'en (银恩乡), Zhatuo (扎拖乡)
- Seven towns: Bamei (八美镇), Taining (泰宁镇), Wari (瓦日镇), Xianshui (鲜水镇), Yazhuo (亚卓镇), Yuke (玉科镇), Zhongni (仲尼镇)

=== Dêgê County ===
- Seventeen townships: Babang (八帮乡), Baiya (白垭乡), Dama (大马乡), Enan (俄南乡), Ezhi (俄支乡), Kasongdu (卡松渡乡), Keluodong (柯洛洞乡), Langduo (浪多乡), Niangu (年古乡), Puma (彪马乡), Rangu (然姑乡), Suoba (所巴乡), Wangbuding (汪布顶乡), Wogong (窝公乡), Yading (亚丁乡), Yueba (岳巴乡), Yulong (玉隆乡)
- Ten towns: Axu (阿须镇), Cuo'a (错阿镇), Dagun (打滚镇), Gengqing (更庆镇), Gongya (龚垭镇), Maisu (麦宿镇), Manigange (马尼干戈镇), Wentuo (温拖镇), Zhongzhake (中扎科镇), Zhuqing (竹庆镇)

=== Dêrong County ===
- Nine townships: Bari (八日乡), Bendu (奔都乡), Ciwu (茨巫乡), Gongbo (贡波乡), Guxue (古学乡), Quyagong (曲拱乡), Rilong (日隆乡), Sizha (四栅乡), Xulong (徐龙乡)
- Five towns: Baisong (白松镇), Riyu (日雨镇), Songmai (松麦镇), Taiyanggu (太阳谷镇), Waka (瓦卡镇)

=== Garzê County ===
- Nineteen townships: Chazha (茶扎乡), Dade (大德乡), Duoduo (夺多乡), Gonglong (贡隆乡), Kagong (卡攻乡), Kalong (卡龙乡), Nanduo (南多乡), Nike (泥柯乡), Renguo (仁果乡), Sexidi (色西底乡), Shengkang (生康乡), Si'e (斯俄乡), Sitongda (四通达乡), Tingka (庭卡乡), Tuoba (拖坝乡), Xiala (呷拉乡), Xiaxiong (下雄乡), Xise (昔色乡), Zhake (扎科乡)
- Three towns: Chalong (查龙镇), Ganzi (甘孜镇), Laima (来马镇)

=== Jiulong County ===
- Ten townships: Bawolong (八窝龙乡), Duoluo (朵洛彝族乡), E'er (额尔乡), Hongba (洪坝乡), Sanyanlong (三岩龙乡), Shangtuan (上团乡), Taka (塔卡乡), Xiaojin (小金彝族乡), Xieka (谢卡乡), Zi'er (子耳彝族乡)
- Nine towns: Kuiduo (魁多镇), Naiqu (乃渠镇), Sanya (三垭镇), Tanggu (汤古镇), Wanba (湾坝镇), Wulaxi (乌拉溪镇), Xia'er (呷尔镇), Xuewalong (雪洼龙镇), Yandai (烟袋镇)

=== Kangding ===
- Thirteen townships: Jiju (吉居乡), Kongyu (孔玉乡), Maibeng (麦崩乡), Pengbuxi (朋布西乡), Pengta (捧塔乡), Pusharong (普沙绒乡), Qianxi (前溪乡), Sanhe (三合乡), Shelian (舍联乡), Shiji (时济乡), Waze (瓦泽乡), Xiaba (呷巴乡), Yala (雅拉乡)
- Seven towns: Gonggashan (贡嘎山镇), Guzan (姑咱镇), Jiagenba (甲根坝镇), Jintang (金汤镇), Shade (沙德镇), Tagong (塔公镇), Xinduqiao (新都桥镇)
- One subdistrict: Lucheng (炉城街道)

=== Litang County ===
- Twenty townships: Benge (奔戈乡), Cunge (村戈乡), Dewu (德巫乡), Gawa (呷洼乡), Gemu (格木乡), Hayi (哈依乡), Heni (禾尼乡), Lamaya (拉玛亚乡), Maiwa (麦洼乡), Moba (莫坝乡), Qudeng (曲灯乡), Rongba (绒坝乡), Shangmula (上木拉乡), Xiake (霞客乡), Xiamula (夏木拉乡), Yahuo (亚火乡), Zangba (藏坝乡), Zhangna (张纳乡), Zhongmula (中木拉乡), Zhuosang (濯桑乡)
- Seven towns: Gaocheng (高城镇), Genie (格聂镇), Jiawa (甲洼镇), Juewu (觉吾镇), Junba (君坝镇), Labo (拉波镇), Mula (木拉镇)

=== Luding County ===
- Three township: Lan'an (岚安乡), Tianba (田坝乡), Chuni (春泥乡)
- Nine towns: Detuo (得妥镇), Dewei (德威镇), Jiajun (家军镇), Lengqi (冷碛镇), Luqiao (泸桥镇), Moxi (磨西镇), Pengba (烹坝镇), Xinglong (兴隆镇), Yanzigou (燕子沟镇)

=== Luhuo County ===
- Thirteen townships: Chonggu (充古乡) Dandu (旦都乡), Gengzhi (更知乡), Kanlang (卡娘乡), Luoqiu (洛秋乡), Simu (司木乡), Niba (泥巴乡), Renda (仁达乡), Xialuokema (下罗柯马乡), Yade (雅德乡), Yimu (宜木乡), Zongmai (宗麦乡) Zongta (宗塔乡)
- Four towns: Shangluokema (上罗柯马镇), Xialatuo (虾拉沱镇), Xindu (新都镇), Zhuwo (朱倭镇)

=== Sêrtar County ===
- Twelve townships: Daze (大则乡), Dazhang (大章乡), Geletuo (歌乐沱乡), Huoxi (霍西乡), Kangle (康勒乡), Keguo (克果乡), Nianlong (年龙乡), Ranchong (然充乡), Tazi (塔子乡), Xuri (旭日乡), Yalong (亚龙乡), Yangge (杨各乡)
- Five towns: Jiaxue (甲学镇), Luoruo (洛若镇), Niduo (泥朵镇), Seke (色柯镇), Wengda (翁达镇)

=== Sêrxü County ===
- Sixteen townships: Benda (奔达乡), Changshaganma (长沙干马乡), Changshagongma (长沙贡马乡), Changxuganma (长须干马乡), Changxugongma (长须贡马乡), Derongma (德荣马乡), Eduoma (依多马乡), Gemeng (格孟乡), Maxia (麻呷乡), Qiwu (起坞乡), Waxu (瓦须乡), Xiayi (呷衣乡), Xinrong (新荣乡), Yiniu (宜牛乡), Zhenda (真达乡), Zhengke (正科乡)
- Six towns: Arizha (阿日扎镇), Luoxu (洛须镇), Mengyi (蒙宜镇), Nixia (尼呷镇), Wenbo (温波镇), Xiazha (虾扎镇)

=== Xiangcheng County ===
- Eight townships: Baiyi (白依乡), Dingbo (定波乡), Dongsong (洞松乡), Qingmai (青麦乡), Ranwu (然乌乡), Shagong (沙贡乡), Shuiwa (水洼乡), Zhengdou (正斗乡)
- Four towns: Nisi (尼西镇), Qingde (青德镇), Reda (热打镇), Xiangbala (香巴拉镇)

=== Xinlong County ===
- Thirteen townships: Bomei (博美乡), Heping (和平乡), Jialaxi (甲拉西乡), Le'an (乐安乡), Luogu (洛古乡), Mari (麻日乡), Pica (皮擦乡), Raolu (绕鲁乡), Shadui (沙堆乡), Xionglongxi (雄龙西乡), Yinduo (银多乡), Youyi (友谊乡), Zituoxi (子拖西乡)
- Six towns: Dagai (大盖镇), Larima (拉日马镇), Rulong (如龙镇), Sewei (色威镇), Tongxiao (通宵镇), Youlaxi (尤拉西镇)

=== Yajiang County ===
- Eleven townships: Bajiaolou (八角楼乡), Bayirong (八衣绒乡), Decha (德差乡), Egu (恶古乡), Milong (米龙乡), Murong (木绒乡), Pubarong (普巴绒乡), Waduo (瓦多乡), Yayihe (牙衣河乡), Zhusang (祝桑乡)
- Six towns: Bosihe (波斯河镇), Hekou (河口镇), Honglong (红龙镇), Malangcuo (麻郎错镇), Xiala (呷拉镇), Xi'eluo (西俄洛镇)

== Guang'an ==
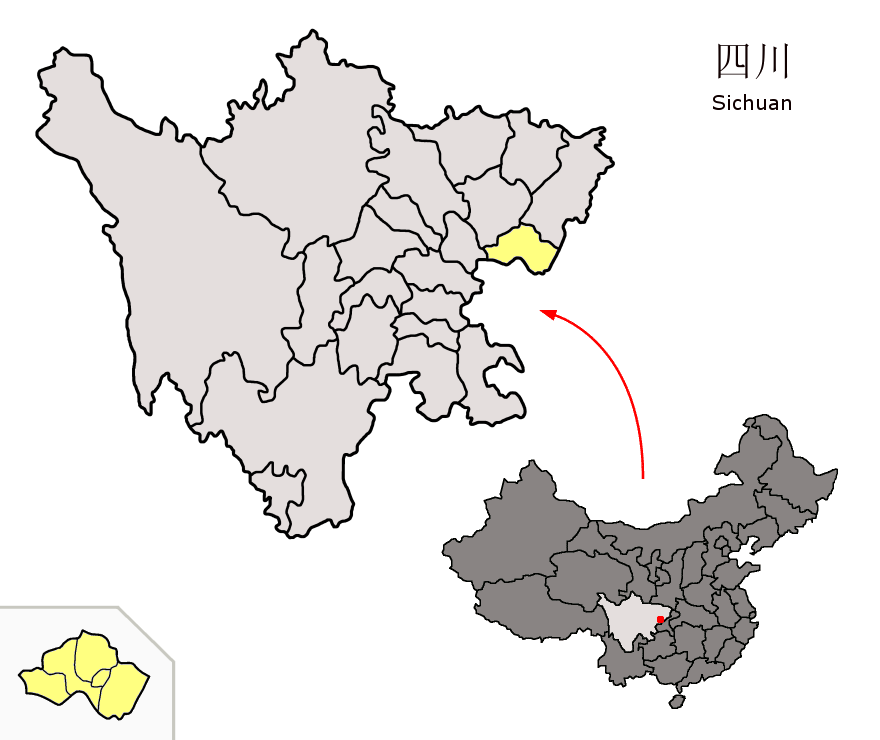
Location of Guang'an and its county-level areas in Sichuan.

=== Guang'an District ===
- Fourteen townships: Baima (白马乡), Chongwang (崇望乡), Dayou (大有乡), Fangping (方坪乡), Guangluo (广罗乡), Guangmen (广门乡), Hualong (化龙乡), Long'an (龙安乡), Pengjia (彭家乡), Suxi (蒲莲乡), Xiaohe (苏溪乡), Yangping (杨坪乡), Zhengshan (郑山乡)
- Sixteen towns: Baishi (白市镇), Chuanshi (穿石镇), Da'an (大安镇 ), Dalong (大龙镇), Dongyue (东岳镇), Guansheng (官盛镇), Hengsheng (恒升镇), Huaqiao (花桥镇), Jinghe (井河镇), Longtai (龙台镇), Nongxi (浓溪镇), Shisun (石笋镇), Xiaoxi (肖溪镇), Xiexing (协兴镇), Xingping (兴平镇), Yuelai (悦来镇)
- Six subdistricts: Beichen (北辰街道), Guangfu (广福街道), Nonghui (浓洄街道), Wansheng (万盛街道), Zaoshan (枣山街道), Zhongqiao (中桥街道)

=== Huaying ===
- One township: Hongyan (红岩乡)
- Nine towns: Gaoxing (高兴镇), Guanyinxi (观音溪镇), Lushi (禄市镇), Mingyue (明月镇), Qinghua (庆华镇), Tianchi (天池镇), Xikou (溪口镇), Yanghe (阳和镇), Yongxing (永兴镇)
- Three subdistricts: Guqiao (古桥街道), Hualong (华龙街道), Shuanghe (双河街道)

=== Linshui County ===
- Nineteen townships: Chang'an (长安乡), Changtan (长滩乡), Fengya (风垭乡), Ganba (甘坝乡), Guanhe (关河乡), Gulu (古路乡), Huaying (华蓥乡), Hulin (护邻乡), Jingping (荆坪乡), Jiufeng (九峰乡), Lengjia (冷家乡), Liangshan (凉山乡), Liutang (柳塘乡), Longqiao (龙桥乡), Sihai (四海乡), Tongshi (同石乡), Xinzhen (新镇乡), Xitian (西天乡), Zizhong (子中乡)
- Twenty-six towns: Ba'er (八耳镇), Chengbei (城北镇), Chengnan (城南镇), Chunmu (椿木镇), Dingping (鼎屏镇), Fenghe (丰禾镇), Fusheng (复盛镇), Ganzi (柑子镇), Gaotan (高滩镇), Guanyinqiao (观音桥镇), Heliu (合流镇), Jiulong (九龙镇), Liangban (梁板镇), Lianghe (两河镇), Lijia (黎家镇), Long'an (龙安镇), Moujia (牟家镇), Sangu (三古镇), Shiyong (石永镇), Shizi (石滓镇), Taihe (太和镇), Tantong (坛同镇), Wangjia (王家镇), Xingren (兴仁镇), Yuanshi (袁市镇), Yulin (御临镇)

=== Qianfeng District ===
- Two townships: Guanghui (光辉乡), Xiaojing (小井乡)
- Eight towns: Daishi (代市镇), Guange (观阁镇), Guangxing (广兴镇), Guantang (观塘镇), Guixing (桂兴镇), Hu'an (护安镇), Hucheng (虎城镇), Longtan (龙滩镇)
- Three subdistricts: Dafosi (大佛寺街道), Kuige (奎阁街道), Xinqiao (新桥街道)

=== Wusheng County ===
- Twelve townships: Baiping (白坪乡), Bayi (八一乡), Gaoshi (高石乡), Gujiang (鼓匠乡), Jinguang (金光乡), Jiuxian (旧县乡), Longting (龙庭乡), Mengshan (猛山乡), Shuangxing (双星乡), Xinxue (新学乡), Yongsheng (永胜乡), Zhenjing (真静乡)
- Nineteen towns: Baozhensai (宝箴塞镇), Feilong (飞龙镇), Huafeng (华封镇), Jiezi (街子镇), Jinniu (金牛镇), Leshan (乐善镇), Li'an (礼安镇), Liemian (烈面镇), Longnu (龙女镇), Mingzhong (鸣钟镇), Qingping (清平镇), Saima (赛马镇), Sanxi (三溪镇), Shengli (胜利镇), Shipan (石盘镇), Wanlong (万隆镇), Wanshan (万善镇), Yankou (沿口镇), Zhongxin (中心镇)

=== Yuechi County ===
- Seventeen townships: Beicheng (北城乡), Changtian (长田乡), Dafo (大佛乡), Dashi (大石乡), Dongban (东板乡), Huaban (花板乡), Huanglong (黄龙乡), Jialing (嘉陵乡), Konglong (恐龙乡), Pailou (排楼乡), Ping'an (平安乡), Shigu (石鼓乡), Shuangyan (双鄢乡), Tuanjie (团结乡), Yufeng (鱼峰乡), Zhenlong (镇龙乡), Zongba (粽粑乡)
- Twenty-four towns: Baimiao (白庙镇), Fulong (伏龙镇), Goujiao (苟角镇), Guxian (顾县镇), Huayuan (花园镇), Linxi (临溪镇), Longkong (龙孔镇), Luodu (罗渡镇), Pingtan (坪滩镇), Pu'an (普安镇), Qiaojia (乔家镇), Qifu (齐福镇), Qinxi (秦溪镇), Sailong (赛龙镇), Shiya (石垭镇), Tianping (天平镇), Tongxing (同兴镇), Xiban (西板镇), Xinchang (新场镇), Xinglong (兴隆镇), Youxi (酉溪镇), Yumin (裕民镇), Zhenyu (镇裕镇), Zhonghe (中和镇)
- Two subdistricts: Chaoyang (朝阳街道), Jiulong (九龙街道)

== Guangyuan ==
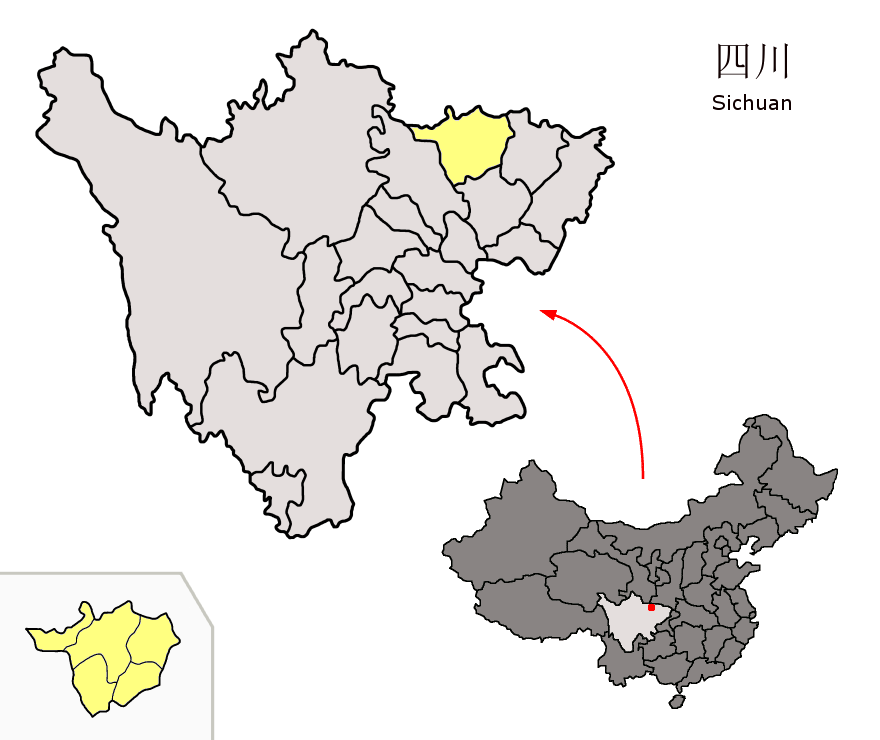
Location of Guangyuan and its county-level areas in Sichuan.

=== Cangxi County ===
- Fourteen townships: Baihe (白鹤乡), Baishan (白山乡), Chanlin (禅林乡), Huangmao (黄茅乡), Longdong (龙洞乡), Pengdian (彭店乡), Qiaoxi (桥溪乡), Shimen (石门乡), Shizao (石灶乡), Shuanghe (双河乡), Xinguan (新观乡), Yonghe (雍河乡), Yueshan (月山乡), Zheshui (浙水乡)
- Twenty-seven towns: Baili (百利镇), Baiqiao (白桥镇), Baiyi (白驿镇), Dongqing (东青镇), Dongxi (东溪镇), Gaopo (高坡镇), Hedi (河地镇), Huangmaoya (黄猫垭镇), Huanma (唤马镇), Lijiang (漓江镇), Lingjiang (陵江镇), Longshan (龙山镇), Longwang (龙王镇), Qiping (歧坪镇), Sanchuan (三川镇), Shima (石马镇), Tingzi (亭子镇), Wenchang (文昌镇), Wulong (五龙镇), Yongning (永宁镇), Yuanba (元坝镇), Yuanxi (鸳溪镇), Yuedong (岳东镇), Yunfeng (云峰镇), Yunshan (运山镇), Zhongtu (中土镇)

=== Chaotian District ===
- Sixteen townships: Baiyang (柏杨乡), Chenjia (陈家乡), Dongxihe (东西河乡), Huashi (华氏乡), Linxi (临溪乡), Majiaba (马家坝乡), Maliu (麻柳乡), Pingxi (平溪乡), Pujia (蒲家乡), Qinglin (青林乡), Shuimogou (水磨沟镇), Wangjia (汪家乡), Wan'an (文安乡), Xiao'an (小安乡), Xibei (西北乡), Yudong (鱼洞乡)
- Eleven towns: Chaotian (朝天镇), Datan (大滩镇), Lianghekou (两河口镇), Lijia (李家镇), Shahe (沙河镇), Xuanhe (宣河镇), Yangmu (羊木镇), Yunwushan (云雾山镇), Zengjia (曾家镇), Zhongzi (中子镇), Zhuandou (转斗镇)

=== Jiange County ===
- Twenty-eight townships: Baiya (柏垭乡), Beimiao (北庙乡), Beiya (碑垭乡), Changling (长岭乡), Chuiquan (垂泉乡), Gaochi (高池乡), Gongdian (公店乡), Guangping (广坪乡), Guogang (国光乡), Hefeng (禾丰乡), Houshi (吼狮乡), Jiangshi (江石乡), Jingping (锦屏乡), Liangshan (凉山乡), Madeng (马灯乡), Maoba (毛坝乡), Qiaodian (樵店乡), Quanlong (圈龙乡), Shangsi (上寺乡), Tianjia (田家乡), Wanquan (碗泉乡), Wenxi (闻溪乡), Ximiao (西庙乡), Xiuzhong (秀钟乡), Yaoling (摇铃乡), Yingshui (迎水乡), Zheba (柘坝乡), Zhengxing (正兴乡)
- Twenty-nine towns: Bailong (白龙镇), Chengbei (城北镇), Dianzi (店子镇), Dongbao (东宝镇), Gaoguan (高观镇), Gongxing (公兴镇), Hanyang (汉阳镇), Heling (鹤龄镇), Jiangkou (江口镇), Jianmenguan (剑门关镇), Jinxian (金仙镇), Kaifeng (开封镇), Liugou (柳沟镇), Longyuan (龙源镇), Muma (木马镇), Pu'an (普安镇), Tushan (涂山镇), Wanghe (王河镇), Wulian (武连镇), Xiangchen (香沉镇), Xiasi (下寺镇), Yandian (盐店镇), Yangcun (杨村镇), Yangling (羊岭镇), Yansheng (演圣镇), Yaojia (姚家镇), Yixing (义兴镇), Yuanshan (元山镇), Zhangwang (张王镇)

=== Lizhou District ===
- Three townships: Baichao (白朝乡), Jindong (金洞乡), Longtan (龙潭乡)
- Seven towns: Baolun (宝轮镇), Chihua (赤化镇), Dashi (大石镇), Gongnong (工农镇), Panlong (盘龙镇), Rongshan (荣山镇), Sandui (三堆镇)
- Nine subdistricts: Dongba (东坝街道), Hexi (河西街道), Huilonghe (回龙河街道), Jialing (嘉陵街道), Nanhe (南河街道), Shangxi (上西街道), Xiaxi (下西街道), Xuefang (雪峰街道), Yangjiayan (杨家岩街道)

=== Qingchuan County ===
- Twenty-four townships: Baijia (白家乡), Banqiao (板桥乡), Chaba (茶坝乡), Daba (大坝乡), Dayuan (大院回族乡), Guanyindian (观音店乡), Haoxi (蒿溪回族乡), Hongguang (红光乡), Huangping (黄坪乡), Jinzishan (金子山乡), Kongxi (孔溪乡), Le'ansi (乐安寺乡), Louzi (楼子乡), Magong (马公乡), Maoba (茅坝乡), Qianjin (前金乡), Qiaolou (桥楼乡), Qifo (七佛乡), Qima (骑马乡), Quhe (曲河乡), Shiba (石坝乡), Suhe (苏河乡), Wali (瓦砾乡), Yingpan (营盘乡)
- Thirteen towns: Fangshi (房石镇), Guanzhuang (关庄镇), Jianfeng (建峰镇), Le'an (乐安寺乡), Liangshui (凉水镇), Malu (马鹿镇), Muyu (木鱼镇), Qiaozhuang (乔庄镇), Qingxi (青溪镇), Sanguo (三锅镇), Shazhou (沙州镇), Yaodu (姚渡镇), Zhuyuan (竹园镇)

=== Wangcang County ===
- Thirteen townships: Dahe (大河乡), Fuqing (福庆乡), Gucheng (鼓城乡), Hualong (化龙乡), Liuxi (柳溪乡), Maying (麻英乡), Mengzi (檬子乡), Nongjian (农建乡), Wanjia (万家乡), Wanshan (万山乡), Yanzi (燕子乡), Zaolin (枣林乡), Zhengyuan (正源乡)
- Twenty-two towns: Baishui (白水镇), Dade (大德镇), Daliang (大两镇), Donghe (东河镇), Gaoyang (高阳镇), Guohua (国华镇), Huangyang (黄洋镇), Jiachuan (嘉川镇), Jinxi (金溪镇), Jiulong (九龙镇), Longfeng (龙凤镇), Mumen (木门镇), Puji (普济镇), Sanjiang (三江镇), Shangwu (尚武镇), Shuanghui (双汇镇), Shuimo (水磨镇), Tianxing (天星镇), Wuquan (五权镇), Yanhe (盐河镇), Yingcui (英萃镇), Zhanghua (张华镇)
- Three subdistricts: Chengjialing Shequ (陈家岭社区街道), Jinglesi (静乐寺街道), Moyanshequ (磨岩社区街道)

=== Zhaohua District ===
- Fourteen townships: Baiguo (白果乡), Chaoyang (朝阳乡), Chenjiang (陈江乡), Dachao (大朝乡), Dingjia (丁家乡), Huanglong (黄龙乡), Jinxian (晋贤乡), Liuqiao (柳桥乡), Meishu (梅树乡), Shaba (沙坝乡), Wencun (文村乡), Xiangxi (香溪乡), Zhangjia (张家乡), Ziyun (紫云乡)
- Fourteen towns: Bailingou (柏林沟镇), Hongyan (红岩镇), Hutiao (虎跳镇), Mingjue (明觉镇), Motan (磨滩镇), Qingniu (青牛镇), Qinghsui (清水镇), Shejian (射箭镇), Shijingpu (石井铺镇), Taigong (太公镇), Wangjia (王家镇), Weizi (卫子镇), Yuanba (元坝镇), Zhaohua (昭化镇)
- One subdistrict: Jianyinyanshequ (拣银岩社区街道)

== Leshan ==
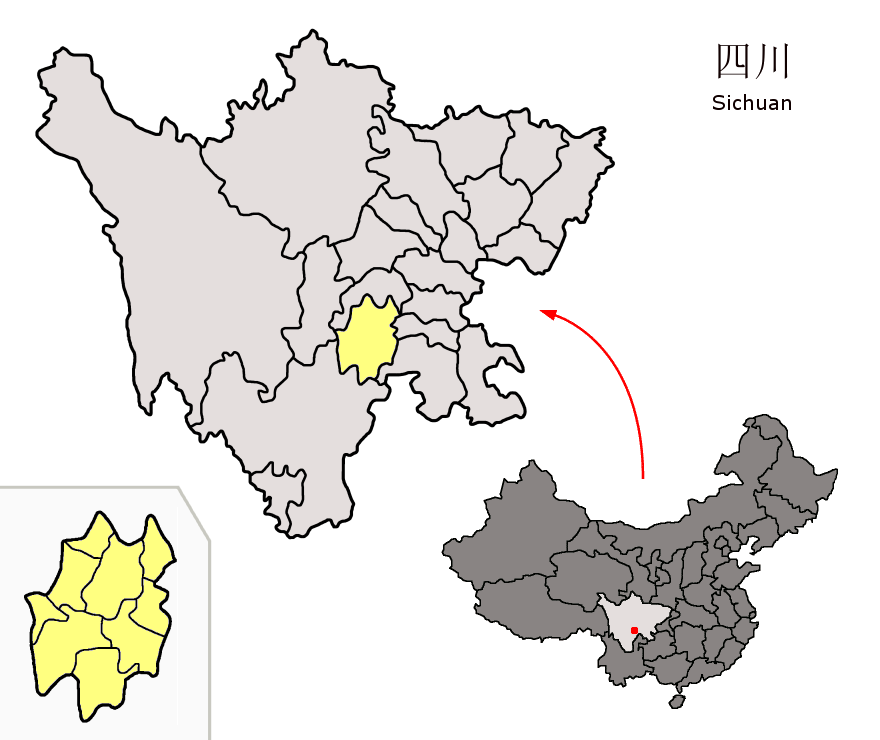
Location of Leshan and its county-level areas in Sichuan.

=== Ebian Yi Autonomous County ===
- Thirteen townships: Baiyang (白杨乡), Gonghe (共和乡), Haqu (哈曲乡), Honghua (红花乡), Jinyan (金岩乡), Juemo (觉末乡), Lewu (勒乌乡), Pingdeng (平等乡), Wanping (万坪乡), Xinchang (新场乡), Yanghe (杨河乡), Yangcun (阳村乡), Yiping (宜坪乡)
- Seven towns: Dabao (大堡镇), Heizhugou (黑竹沟镇), Hongqi (红旗镇), Maoping (毛坪镇), Shaping (沙坪镇), Wudu (五渡镇), Xinlin (新林镇)

=== Emeishan City ===
- Three townships: Longmen (龙门乡), Puxing (普兴乡), Shaxi (沙溪乡)
- Thirteen towns: Chuanzhu (川主镇), Dawei (大为镇), Fuxi (符溪镇), Gaoqiao (高桥镇), Guihuaqiao (桂花桥镇), Huangwan (黄湾镇), Jiuli (九里镇), Ledu (乐都镇), Longchi (龙池镇), Luomu (罗目镇), Shuangfu (双福镇), Suishan (绥山镇), Xinping (新平镇)
- Two subdistricts: Eshan (峨山街道), Shengli (胜利街道)

=== Jiajiang County ===
- Ten townships: Longtuo (龙沱乡), Maliu (麻柳乡), Nan'an (南安乡), Qingzhou (青州乡), Shunhe (顺河乡), Tumen (土门乡), Wufeng (梧凤乡), Xiema (歇马乡), Yingjiang (迎江乡), Yongqing (永青乡)
- Twelve towns: Ganjiang (甘江镇), Ganlin (甘霖镇), Huangtu (黄土镇), Huatou (华头镇), Jiepai (界牌镇), Macun (马村镇), Mucheng (木城镇), Sandong (三洞镇), Wuchang (吴场镇), Xinchang (新场镇), Yancheng (焉城镇), Zhongxing (中兴镇)

=== Jingyan County ===
- Eleven townships: Dafo (大佛乡), Fenquan (分全乡), Gaotan (高滩乡), Huangbo (黄钵乡), Jinfeng (金峰乡), Sanjiao (三教乡), Shengquan (胜泉乡), Shiniu (石牛乡), Sihe (四合乡), Tianyun (天云乡), Wupao (乌抛乡)
- Fifteen towns: Baowu (宝五镇), Chunflu (纯复镇), Donglin (东林镇), Gaofeng (高凤镇), Jiyi (集益镇), Mata (马踏镇), Menkan (门坎镇), Mochi (磨池镇), Qianfo (千佛镇), Sanjiang (三江镇), Wangcun (王村镇), Yanjing (研经镇), Zhenyang (镇阳镇), Zhoupo (周坡镇), Zhuyuan (竹园镇)
- One subdistrict: Yancheng (研城街道)

=== Jinkouhe District ===
- Four townships: Gong'an (共安彝族乡), Jixing (吉兴乡), Heping (和平彝族乡), Yongsheng (永胜乡)
- Two towns: Jinhe (金河镇), Yonghe (永和镇)

=== Mabian Yi Autonomous County ===
- Ten townships: Dazhubao (大竹堡乡), Gaozhuoying (高卓营乡), Laoheba (老河坝乡), Meiziba (梅子坝乡), Shaqiang (沙强乡), Shiliang (石梁乡), Qiaoba (乔坝乡), Yonghong (永红乡), Yuanjiaxi (袁家溪乡), Zhenjiangmiao (镇江庙乡)
- Twelve towns: Jianshe (建设镇), Laodong (劳动镇), Meilin (梅林镇), Minjian (民建镇), Minzhu (民主镇), Qiaoba (荍坝镇), Rongding (荣丁镇), Sanhekou (三河口镇), Suba (苏坝镇), Xiaxi (下溪镇), Xuekoushan (雪口山镇), Yanfeng (烟峰镇)

=== Muchuan County ===
- Twelve townships: Cizhu (茨竹乡), Dibao (底堡乡), Fengcun (凤村乡), Fuhe (府河乡), Gaosun (高笋乡), Haiyun (海云乡), Jianhe (建和乡), Tanku (炭库乡), Wusheng (武圣乡), Xinfan (新繁乡), Xingfu (幸福乡), Yangcun (杨村乡)
- Eight towns: Danan (大楠镇), Fuxin (富新镇), Huangdan (黄丹镇), Jianban (箭板镇), Lidian (利店镇), Muxi (沐溪镇), Yongfu (永福镇), Zhouba (舟坝镇)

=== Qianwei County ===
- Eleven townships: Fulong (伏龙乡), Gongping (公平乡), Jijia (纪家乡), Mamiao (马庙乡), Mindong (岷东乡), Nanyang (南阳乡), Tangba (塘坝乡), Tongxing (同兴乡), Xiadu (下渡乡), Xinsheng (新盛乡), Zhagu (榨鼓乡)
- Nineteen towns: Aojia (敖家镇), Bagou (芭沟镇), Daxing (大兴镇), Dingwen (定文镇), Jinshijing (金石井镇), Jiujing (九井镇), Longkong (龙孔镇), Luocheng (罗城镇), Qingxi (清溪镇), Quanshui (泉水镇), Shixi (石溪镇), Shuobao (寿保镇), Shuangxi (双溪镇), Tielu (铁炉镇), Wuyu (舞雩镇), Xiaogu (孝姑镇), Xinmin (新民镇), Yujin (玉津镇), Yuping (玉屏镇)

=== Shawan District ===
- Four townships: Bishan (碧山乡), Fandian (范店乡), Tanba (谭坝乡), Tongci (铜茨乡)
- Nine towns: Fulu (福禄镇), Gongzui (龚嘴镇), Hulu (葫芦镇), Jianong (嘉农镇), Niushi (牛石镇), Shawan (沙湾镇), Taiping (太平镇), Tashui (踏水镇), Zhenxi (轸溪镇)

=== Shizhong District ===
- Seven townships: Guanmiao (关庙乡), Jiulong (九龙乡), Lingyun (凌云乡), Puren (普仁乡), Shilong (石龙乡), Yangwan (杨湾乡), Yingyang (迎阳乡)
- Seventeen towns: Angu (安谷镇), Baima (白马镇), Chezi (车子镇), Jianfeng (剑峰镇), Jiufeng (九峰镇), Linjiang (临江镇), Luohan (罗汉镇), Maoqiao (茅桥镇), Mianzhu (棉竹镇), Mouzi (牟子镇), Pingxing (平兴镇), Qingping (青平镇), Shuikou (水口镇), Suji (苏稽镇), Tongjia (童家镇), Tuzhu (土主镇), Yuelai (悦来镇)
- Eight subdistricts: Baiyang (柏杨街道), Boshui (泊水街道), Dafo (大佛街道), Quanfu (全福街道), Shanghe (上河街道), Tongjiang (通江街道), Xiaoba (肖坝街道), Zhanggongqiao (张公桥街道)

=== Wutongqiao District ===
- One township: Xinyun (新云乡)
- Eleven towns: Caijin (蔡金镇), Guanying (冠英镇), Huishan (辉山镇), Jinshan (金山镇), Jinsu (金粟镇), Niuhua (牛华镇), Qiaogou (桥沟镇), Shilin (石麟镇), Xiba (西坝镇), Yangliu (杨柳镇), Zhugen (竹根镇)

== Liangshan Yi Autonomous Prefecture ==
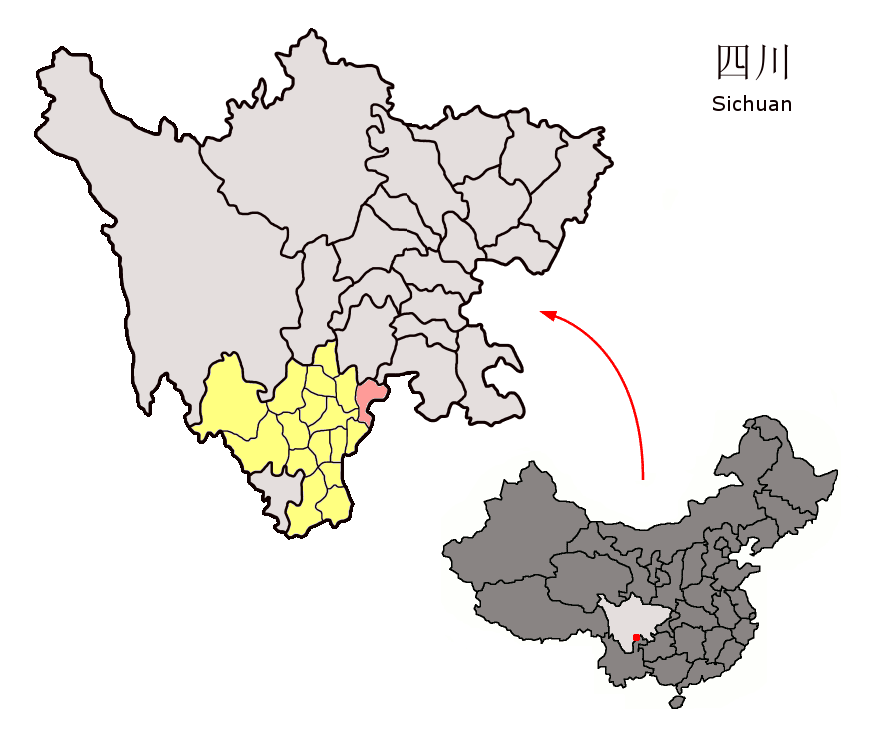
Location of Leibo County within Liangshan Yi Autonomous Prefecture and its county-level areas in Sichuan.

=== Butuo County ===
- Twenty-seven townships: Baoguping (包谷坪乡), Bu'er (补尔乡), Buluo (补洛乡), Caiha (采哈乡), Diluo (地洛乡), Eliping (俄里坪乡), Hejing (合井乡), Huolie (火烈乡), Jiudu (九都乡), Jizhi (基只乡), Juesa (觉撒乡), Lada (拉达乡), Laguo (拉果乡), Langzhu (浪珠乡), Le'an (乐安乡), Lianbu (联补乡), Luogu (洛古乡), Luojiaping (罗家坪乡), Meisa (美撒乡), Mu'er (木尔乡), Niujiaowan (牛角湾乡), Shaluo (沙洛乡), Sike (四棵乡), Wadu (瓦都乡), Weizhuilo (委只洛乡), Wuke (乌科乡), Wuyi (乌依乡)
- Three towns: Longtan (龙潭镇), Temuli (特木里镇), Tuojue (拖觉镇)

=== Dechang County ===
- Eight townships: Daliucao (大六槽乡), Dashan (大山乡), Dawan (大湾乡), Jinsha (金沙傈僳族乡), Liusuo (六所镇), Ma'an (马岸乡), Nanshan (南山傈僳族乡), Qianshan (前山乡), Yinlu (银鹿乡)
- Fifteen towns: Ayue (阿月镇), Badong (巴洞镇), Cida (茨达镇), Heilongtan (黑龙潭镇), Jinchuan (锦川镇), Kuanyu (宽裕镇), Laonian (老碾镇), Leyue (乐跃镇), Mali (麻栗镇), Rehe (热河镇), Tielu (铁炉镇), Wangsuo (旺所镇), Xiaogao (小高镇), Yonglang (永郎镇)
- Two subdistricts: Changzhou (昌州街道), Dezhou (德州街道)

=== Ganluo County ===
- Nineteen townships: A'er (阿尔乡), Aga (阿嘎乡), Azijue (阿兹觉乡), Bobo (波波乡), Gari (嘎日乡), Heima (黑马乡), Lamo (拉莫乡), Lianghe (两河乡), Liaoping (蓼坪乡), Like (里克乡), Ni'erjue (尼尔觉乡), Pingba (坪坝乡), Qianjin (前进乡), Shadai (沙岱乡), Shengli (胜利乡), Shihai (石海乡), Tuanjie (团结乡), Xincha (新茶乡), Zela (则拉乡)
- Nine towns: Haitang (海棠镇), Jimi (吉米镇), Puchang (普昌镇), Sijue (斯觉镇), Suxiong (苏雄镇), Tianba (田坝镇), Wushidaqiao (乌史大桥镇), Xinshiba (新市坝镇), Yutian (玉田镇)

=== Huidong County ===
- Thirty-nine townships: Baishan (柏杉乡), Baiyan (柏岩乡), Chahe (岔河乡), Changxin (长新乡), Ganhaizi (干海子乡), Haiba (海坝乡), Heiga (黑嘎乡), Hongguo (红果乡), Hongyan (红岩乡), Huoshan (火山乡), Huoshi (火石乡), Jiangxijie (江西街乡), Kehe (可河乡), Lama (拉马乡), Laojuntan (老君滩乡), Laokou (老口乡), Liugu (溜姑乡), Longshu (龙树乡), Luhecun (鹿鹤村乡), Lunan (鲁南乡), Luozuo (洛佐乡), Malong (马龙乡), Pingtang (坪塘乡), Pumie (普咩乡), Sazheyi (撒者邑乡), Shuangyan (双堰乡), Wenqing (文箐乡), Xiaoba (小坝乡), Xiaochahe (小岔河乡), Xiaojie (小街乡), Xinlong (新龙乡), Xinma (新马乡), Xinshan (新山乡), Xintan (新田乡), Xueshan (雪山乡), Yanba (岩坝乡), Yeniuping (野牛坪乡), Yezu (野租乡), Zhongxin (中心乡)
- Thirteen towns: Dachong (大崇镇), Duge (堵格镇), Gaji (嘎吉镇), Jiangzhou (姜州镇), Luji (鲁吉镇), Manyingou (满银沟镇), Qianxin (铅锌镇), Shenyuhe (鲹鱼河镇), Songping (松坪镇), Tangtang (淌塘镇), Tieliu (铁柳镇), Wudongde (新马乡), Xinjie (新街镇)

=== Huili City ===
- Thirty-five townships: Aiguo (爱国乡), Ailang (矮郎乡), Aimin (爱民乡), Baiguowan (白果湾乡), Baiji (白鸡乡), Bajiao (芭蕉乡), Cangtian (仓田乡), Caoyuan (槽元乡), Faping (法坪乡), Fengying (凤营乡), Guoyuan (果元乡), Haichao (海潮乡), Hekou (河口乡), Hengshan (横山乡), Huangbai (黄柏乡), Jiangpu (江普乡), Jiangzhu (江竹乡), Jinyu (金雨乡), Laojie (老街乡), Lihong (黎洪乡), Liumin (六民乡), Longquan (龙泉乡), Mazong (马宗乡), Nange (南阁乡), Neidong (内东乡), Pulong (普隆乡), Sandi (三地乡), Shubao (树堡乡), Waibei (外北乡), Xiacun (下村乡), Xin'an (新安傣族乡), Yangjiaba (杨家坝乡), Yuzha (鱼乍乡), Zhongchang (中厂乡), Zhuqing (竹箐乡)
- Fifteen towns: Chengguan (城关镇), Fule (富乐镇), Guanhe (关河镇), Liuhua (六华镇), Lixi (黎溪镇), Luchang (鹿厂镇), Lushui (绿水镇), Mugu (木古镇), Taiping (太平镇), Tong'an (通安镇), Xiaoheiqing (小黑箐镇), Xinfa (新发镇), Yimen (益门镇), Yundian (云甸镇), Zhangguan (彰冠镇)
- One subdistrict: Chengbei (城北街道)

=== Jinyang County ===
- Thirty townships: Bingdi (丙底乡), Chunjiang (春江乡), Dexi (德溪乡), Erjuexi (尔觉西乡), Fangmaping (放马坪乡), Gaofeng (高峰乡), Gengbao (梗堡乡), Gude (谷德乡), Honfeng (红峰乡), Honglian (红联乡), Jiayi (甲依乡), Jijue (基觉乡), Laozhaizi (老寨子乡), Luojue (洛觉乡), Mayizu (马依足乡), Mufu (木府乡), Nanwa (南瓦乡), Qingsong (青松乡), Rekejue (热柯觉乡), Reshuihe (热水河乡), Shanjiang (山江乡), Siwo (丝窝乡), Taoping (桃坪乡), Tugou (土沟乡), Xiangling (向岭乡), Xiaoyinmu (小银木乡), Yida (依达乡), Yimohe (依莫合乡), Zezu (则祖乡), Zhaizi (寨子乡)
- Four towns: Duiping (对坪镇), Lugao (芦稿镇), Pailai (派来镇), Tiandiba (天地坝镇)

=== Leibo County ===
- Forty-two townships: Bagu (巴姑乡), Baitieba (白铁坝乡), Bazhai (八寨乡), Bojiliangzi (簸箕梁子乡), Changhe (长河乡), Dapingzi (大坪子乡), Dayandong (大雁东乡), Ganzi (柑子乡), Gudui (谷堆乡), Guihua (桂花乡), Gumi (谷米乡), Haiwan (海湾乡), Huilongchang (回龙场乡), Kahaluo (卡哈洛乡), Kejue (克觉乡), Lami (拉咪乡), Lanbazi (烂坝子乡), Leichi (雷池乡), Luoshanxi (罗山溪乡), Mahu (马湖乡), Migu (米谷乡), Mohong (莫红乡), Nantian (南田乡), Paha (帕哈乡), Pingtou (坪头乡), Qianwanguan (千万贯乡), Qingkou (箐口乡), Quyi (曲义乡), Shanlenggang (山棱岗乡), Shanshubao (杉树堡乡), Shatuo (沙沱乡), Shuanghekou (双河口乡), Shunhe (顺河乡), Siguxi (斯古溪乡), Songshu (松树乡), Wuguan (五官乡), Xiaogou (小沟乡), Xiluomi (溪洛米乡), Yanjiao (燕郊乡), Yiche (宜车乡), Yuanbaoshan (元宝山乡), Zhongtian (中田乡)
- Eleven towns: Baoshan (宝山镇), Dukou (渡口镇), Huanglang (黄琅镇), Jincheng (锦城镇), Jinsha (金沙镇), Majingzi (马颈子镇), Shangtianba (上田坝镇), Wagang (瓦岗镇), Wenshui (汶水镇), Xining (西宁镇), Yongsheng (永盛镇)

=== Meigu County ===
- Thirty-six townships: Bagu (巴古乡), Bingtu (炳途乡), Caihong (采红乡), Dianbu (典补乡), Equgu (峨曲古乡), Erhe (尔合乡), Erqi (尔其乡), Haluo (哈洛乡), Heguluo (合姑洛乡), Houbonaituo (候播乃拖乡), Hougumo (候古莫乡), Jingyetexi (井叶特西乡), Jiukou (九口乡), Jueluo (觉洛乡), Lamu'ajue (拉木阿觉乡), Leyue (乐约乡), Liuhong (柳洪乡), Longmen (龙门乡), Longwo (龙窝乡), Luo'eyigan (洛俄依甘乡), Luomoyida (洛莫依达乡), Niha (尼哈乡), Niuniuba (牛牛坝乡), Nongxuo (农作乡), Saku (洒库乡), Shuwo (树窝乡), Suluo (苏洛乡), Tuomu (拖木乡), Wagu (瓦古乡), Waxi (瓦西乡), Yiguojue (依果觉乡), Yituolada (依洛拉达乡), Zhuku (竹库乡), Ziwei (子威乡), Zuogeyida (佐戈依达乡)
- One town: Bapu (巴普镇)

=== Mianning County ===
- Twenty-three townships: Caogu (曹古乡), Chengxiang (城厢乡), Haha (哈哈乡), He'ai (和爱藏族乡), Heli (河里乡), Huiping (会坪乡), Jinlin (金林乡), Lawo (劳沃乡), Lianhe (联合乡), Linli (林里乡), Maidigou (麦地沟乡), Matou (马头乡), Mianshawan (绵沙湾乡), Nanhe (南河乡), Qingna (青纳乡), Senrong (森荣乡), Tiechang (铁厂乡), Tuowu (拖乌乡), Wobao (窝堡乡), Xianfeng (先锋乡), Xinxing (新兴乡), Yele (冶勒乡)
- Sixteen towns: Daqiao (大桥镇), Fuxing (复兴镇), Hebian (河边镇), Hongmo (宏模镇), Houshan (后山镇), Hui'an (惠安镇), Huilong (回龙镇), Jinping (锦屏镇), Lizhuang (里庄镇), Lugu (泸沽镇), Mianshuiwan (漫水湾镇), Miansha (棉沙镇), Mofanggou (磨房沟镇), Shilong (石龙镇), Yihai (彝海镇), Zeyuan (泽远镇)
- One subdistrict: Gaoyang (高阳街道)

=== Muli Tibetan Autonomous County ===
- Twenty-two townships: Baidiao (白碉苗族乡), Boke (博科乡), Bowo (博窝乡), Donglang (东朗乡), Eya (俄亚纳西族乡), Guzeng (固增苗族乡), Housuo (后所乡), Kala (卡拉乡), Ke'er (克尔乡), Liziping (李子坪乡), Luobo (倮波乡), Mairi (麦日乡), Maoniuping (牦牛坪乡), Ninglang (宁朗乡), Sanjueya (三桷桠乡), Shawan (沙湾乡), Tangyang (唐央乡), Wujiao (屋脚蒙古族乡), Xiamaidi (下麦地乡), Xiangjiao (项脚蒙古族乡), Xiqiu (西秋乡), Yiji (依吉乡)
- Six towns: Chabulang (茶布朗镇), Liewa (列瓦镇), Qiaowa (乔瓦镇), Shuiluo (水洛镇), Wachang (瓦厂镇), Yalongjiang (雅砻江镇)

=== Ningnan County ===
- Eight townships: Daogu (稻谷乡), Haizi (海子乡), Hongxing (红星乡), Liangzi (梁子乡), Luoge (倮格乡), Shanshu (杉树乡), Xincun (新村乡), Xinjian (新建乡)
- Eighteen towns: Baihetan (白鹤滩镇), Datong (大同镇), Huadan (华弹镇), Hulukou (葫芦口镇), Jingxing (景兴乡), Jule (俱乐镇), Liutie (六铁镇), Ningyuan (宁远镇), Paoma (跑马镇), Pisha (皮沙镇), Qiluogou (骑骡沟镇), Shili (石梨镇), Songlin (松林镇), Songxin (松新镇), Xingfu (幸福镇), Xinhua (新华镇), Xiyao (西瑶镇), Zhushou (竹寿镇)

=== Puge County ===
- Thirty-one townships: Caizi (菜子乡), Dacao (大槽乡), Daping (大坪乡), Dongshan (东山乡), Gantiandi (甘天地乡), Haliluo (哈力洛乡), Hongmoyida (红莫依达乡), Huashan (花山乡), Huilong (辉隆乡), Jiatie (夹铁乡), Jile (吉乐乡), Li'an (黎安乡), Liujiaping (刘家坪乡), Luogan (洛甘乡), Luowugou (洛乌沟乡), Luowu (洛乌乡), Mahong (马洪乡), Meggan (孟甘乡), Tebu (特补乡), Te'ergou (特尔果乡), Tekou (特口乡), Tezi (特兹乡), Waluo (瓦洛乡), Wenping (文坪乡), Wudaoqing (五道箐乡), Xiangyang (向阳乡), Yedi (耶底乡), Yong'an (永安乡), Yuewu (月吾乡), Yushui (雨水乡), Zhulian (祝联乡)
- Three towns: Luojishan (螺髻山镇), Puji (普基镇), Qiaowo (荞窝镇)

=== Xichang ===
- Twenty-seven townships: Baima (白马乡), Daqing (大箐乡), Daxing (大兴乡), Donghe (东河乡), Gaocao (高草回族乡), Gaojian (高枧乡), Huangshui (黄水乡), Jingjiu (经久乡), Kaiyuan (开元乡), Luogubo (洛古波乡), Ma'anshan (马鞍山乡), Mazengyiwu (玛增依乌乡), Minsheng (民胜乡), Mopan (磨盘乡), Pushi (普诗乡), Qiaodi (荞地乡), Sihe (四合乡), Xiangshui (响水乡), Xiaomiao (小庙乡), Xijiao (西郊乡), Xingsheng (兴胜乡), Xixiang (西乡乡), Xixi (西溪乡), Yinchang (银厂乡), Yuehua (月华乡), Yulong (裕隆回族乡), Zhongba (中坝乡)
- Eleven towns: Anha (安哈镇), Anning (安宁镇), Aqi (阿七镇), Baru (巴汝镇), Chuanxing (川兴镇), Huanglianguan (黄联关镇), Langhuan (琅环镇), Lizhou (礼州镇), Taihe (太和镇), Youjun (佑君镇), Zhangmuqing (樟木箐镇)
- Eight subdistricts: Beicheng (北城街道), Chang'an (长安街道), Changing (长宁街道), Dongcheng (东城街道), Hainan (海南街道), Madao (马道街道), Xicheng (西城街道), Xincun (新村街道)

=== Xide County ===
- Sixteen townships: Bajiu (巴久乡), Beishan (北山乡), Boluolada (博洛拉达乡), Eni (额尼乡), Heboluo (贺波洛乡), Lake (拉克乡), Lewu (乐武乡), Lizi (李子乡), Luji (鲁基乡), Luomo (洛莫乡), Qietuo (且拖乡), Rekeyida (热柯依达乡), Shamalada (沙马拉达乡), Xihe (西河乡), Yiluo (依洛乡), Zeyue (则约乡)
- Seven towns: Guangming (光明镇), Hongmo (红莫镇), Lianghekou (两河口镇), Luoha (洛哈镇), Mianshan (冕山镇), Mishi (米市镇), Nibo (尼波镇)

=== Yanyuan County ===
- Twenty-one townships: Asa (阿萨乡), Bazhe (巴哲乡), Boda (博大乡), Dacao (大槽乡), Dahe (大河乡), Dapo (大坡蒙古族乡), Deshi (德石乡), Gaizu (盖租乡), Ganhai (干海乡), Gantang (甘塘乡), Malu (马鹿乡), Qiansuo (前所乡), Shuanghe (双河乡), Taozi (桃子乡), Tengqiao (藤桥乡), Tianwan (田湾乡), Wali (洼里乡), Wodi (沃底乡), Wumu (巫木乡), Xiahai (下海乡), Yousuo (右所乡)
- Fourteen towns: Baiwu (白乌镇), Changbai (长柏镇), Guande (官地镇), Huangcao (黄草镇), Jiami (甲米镇), Jinhe (金河镇), Luguhu (泸沽湖镇), Meiyu (梅雨镇), Meiziping (梅子坪镇), Mianya (棉桠镇), Pingchuan (平川镇), Shuhe (树河镇), Weicheng (卫城镇), Yantang (盐塘镇)
- One subdistrict: Yanjing (盐井街道)

=== Yuexi County ===
- Thirty-one townships: Baiguo (白果乡), Banqiao (板桥乡), Bao'an (保安藏族乡), Baoshi (保石乡), Dahua (大花乡), Datun (大屯乡), Deji (德吉乡), Dingshan (丁山乡), Erjue (尔觉乡), Ersai (尔赛乡), Gongmo (贡莫乡), Gu'er (古二乡), Hedong (河东乡), Labai (拉白乡), Laji (拉吉乡), Lapu (拉普乡), Leqingdi (乐青地乡), Matuo (马拖乡), Meihua (梅花乡), Shenguo (申果乡), Shenpu (申普乡), Siganpu (四甘普乡), Tiexi (铁西乡), Waljue (瓦里觉乡), Wapumo (瓦普莫乡), Waqujue (瓦曲觉乡), Waqunaiwu (瓦曲乃乌乡), Wayan (瓦岩乡), Wuliqing (五里箐乡), Xinxiang (新乡乡), Xishan (西山乡)
- Ten towns: Darui (大瑞镇), Naituo (乃托镇), Nanqing (南箐镇), Puxiong (普雄镇), Shugu (书古镇), Xinmin (新民镇), Yiluodiba (依洛地坝镇), Yuecheng (越城镇), Zhongsuo (中所镇), Zhu'ajue (竹阿觉镇)

=== Zhaojue County ===
- Forty-four townships: Abingluogu (阿并洛古乡), Bi'er (比尔乡), Boluo (博洛乡), Boluo (波洛乡), Buyue (补约乡), Chengbei (城北乡), Chikeboxi (齿可波西乡), Daba (大坝乡), Daluo (达洛乡), Dimo (地莫乡), Ganduoluogu (甘多洛古乡), Gewu (格吾乡), Guqu (谷曲乡), Hagan (哈甘乡), Jiefang (解放乡), Jinqu (金曲乡), Jiuteluoguo (久特洛古乡), Kumo (库莫乡), Kuyi (库依乡), Layimu (拉一木乡), Liuquie (柳且乡), Long'en (龙恩乡), Longgou (龙沟乡), Meigan (美甘乡), Nidi (尼地乡), Qiemo (且莫乡), Qingheng (庆恒乡), Riha (日哈乡), Saladipo (洒拉地坡乡), Sanchahe (三岔河乡), Sangang (三岗乡), Sedi (色底乡), Shuping (树坪乡), Sikai (四开乡), Tangqie (塘且乡), Tebuluo (特布洛乡), Tekoujiagu (特口甲谷乡), Wanchang (碗厂乡), Yangmozu (央摩租乡), Yimudi (宜牧地乡), Yongle (永乐乡), Zepu (则普乡), Zhi'ermo (支尔莫乡), Zhuhe (竹核乡)
- One town: Xincheng (新城镇)

== Luzhou ==
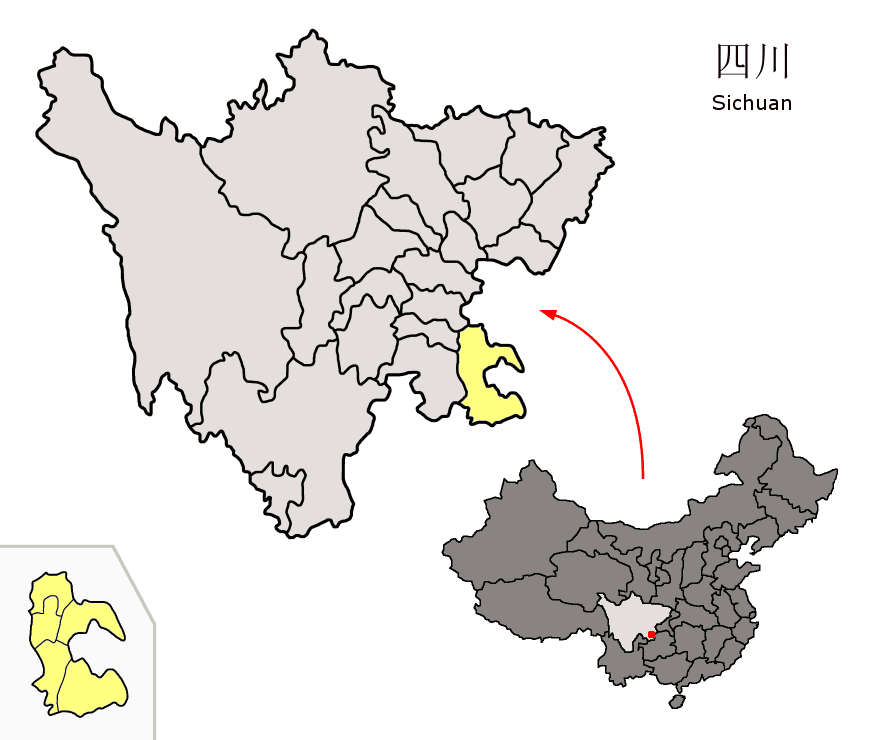
Location of Luzhou and its county-level areas in Sichuan.

=== Gulin County ===
- Three townships: Dazhai (大寨苗族乡), Jianzhu (箭竹苗族乡), Masi (马嘶苗族乡)
- Twenty-one towns: Baini (白泥镇), Dacun (大村镇), Dangui (丹桂镇), Deyao (德耀镇), Dongxin (东新镇), Erlang (二郎镇), Guanwan (观文镇), Guihua (桂花镇), Gulin (古蔺镇), Huanghua (皇华镇), Huangjing (黄荆镇), Jiaoyuan (椒园镇), Longshan (龙山镇), Maoxi (茅溪镇), Mati (马蹄镇), Shibao (石宝镇), Shiping (石屏镇), Shuangsha (双沙镇), Taiping (太平镇), Tucheng (土城镇), Yuhua (雨花镇),
- Two subdistricts: Jinlan (金兰街道), Yongle (永乐街道)

=== Hejiang County ===
- Twenty-six towns: Baliu (白鹿镇), Baimi (白米镇), Baisha (白沙镇), Canbao (残宝镇), Chewang (车辋镇), Daqiao (大桥镇), Fawangsi (法王寺镇), Fengming (凤鸣镇), Foyin (佛印镇), Fubao (福宝镇), Ganyu (甘雨镇), Hejiang (合江镇), Hutou (虎头镇), Jiuzhi (九支镇), Lijiang (荔江镇), Nantan (南滩镇), Rongshan (榕山镇), Shenbicheng (神臂城镇), Shilong (石龙镇), Shilu (石鹿镇), Wanglong (望龙镇), Wutong (梧桐镇), Xianshi (先市镇), Xiantan (先滩镇), Yaoba (尧坝镇), Zihuai (紫怀镇)
- One subdistrict: Fuyang (符阳街道)

=== Jiangyang District ===
- Eight towns: Danlin (丹林镇), Fangshan (方山镇), Fenshuiling (分水岭镇), Huangyi (黄舣镇), Jiangbei (江北镇), Mituo (弥陀镇), Shizhai (石寨镇), Tongyan (通滩镇)
- Ten subdistricts: Beicheng (北城街道), Dashanping (大山坪街道), Huayang (华阳街道), Kuangchang (况场街道), Lantian (蓝田街道), Linyu (邻玉街道), Nancheng (南城街道), Qiancao (茜草街道), Tai'an (泰安街道), Zhangbajingqu (张坝景区办事处)

=== Longmatan District ===
- Four towns: Chang'an (长安镇), Hushi (胡市镇), Jinlong (金龙镇), Shuangjia (双加镇)
- Nine subdistricts: Anning (安宁街道), Gaoba (高坝街道), Hongxing (红星街道), Lianhuachi (莲花池街道), Luohan (罗汉街道), Shidong (石洞街道), Texing (特兴街道), Xiaoshi (小市街道), Yutang (鱼塘街道)

=== Lu County ===
- Nineteen towns: Baihe (百和镇), Chaohe (潮河镇), Desheng (得胜镇), Fangdong (方洞镇), Fuji (福集镇), Haichao (海潮镇), Jiaming (嘉明镇), Lishi (立石镇), Niutan (牛滩镇), Pilu (毗卢镇), Qifeng (奇峰镇), Shiqiao (石桥镇), Taifu (太伏镇), Tianxing (天兴镇), Xuantan (玄滩镇), Yunjin (云锦镇), Yunlong (云龙镇), Yusi (喻寺镇), Zhaoya (兆雅镇)

=== Naxi District ===
- Twelve towns: Baijie (白节镇), Dadukou (大渡口镇), Dagu (打古镇), Fangle (丰乐镇), Hemian (合面镇), Huguo (护国镇), Longche (龙车镇), Mianhuapo (棉花坡镇), Quba (曲巴镇), Shangma (上马镇), Tianxian (天仙镇), Xinle (新乐镇)
- Two subdistricts: Anfu (安富街道), Yongning (永宁街道)

=== Xuyong County ===
- Five townships: Balia (白腊苗族乡), Hele (乐苗族乡), Jiancao (枧槽苗族乡), Shixiangzi (石坝彝族乡), Shuiliao (水潦彝族乡)
- Twenty towns: Chishui (赤水镇), Dashi (大石镇), Fenshui (分水镇), Guanxing (观兴镇), Houshan (后山镇), Huangni (黄坭镇), Jiangmen (江门镇), Lianghe (两河镇), Longfeng (龙凤镇), Luobu (落卜镇), Macheng (麻城镇), Maling (马岭镇), Moni (摩尼镇), Shuiwei (水尾镇), Tianchi (天池镇), Xianglin (向林镇), Xinglong (兴隆镇), Xuyong (叙永镇), Yingshan (英山镇), Zhengdong (正东镇)

== Meishan ==
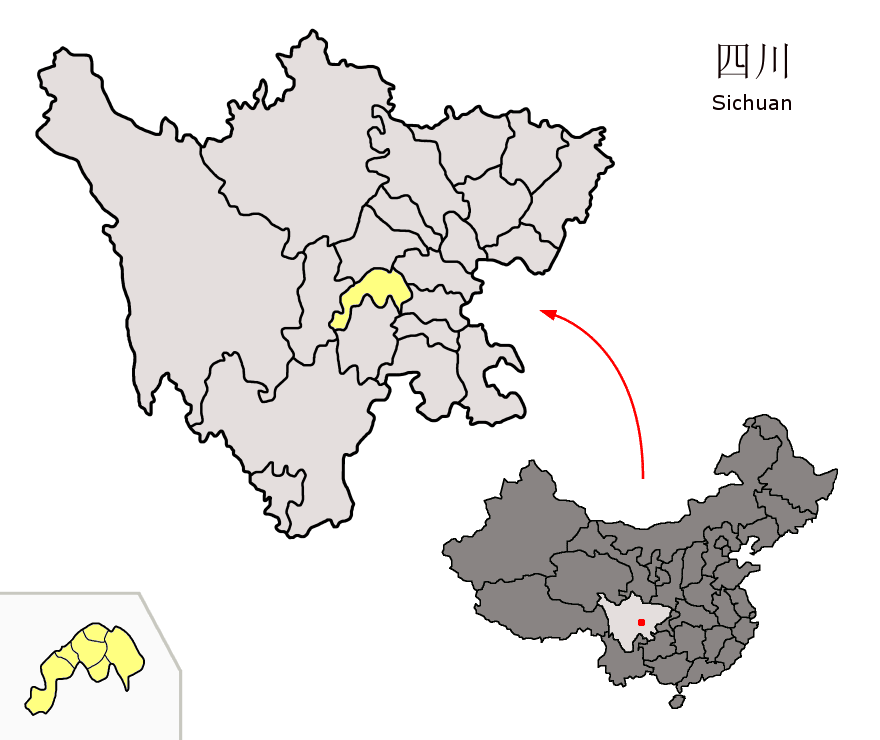
Location of Meishan and its county-level areas in Sichuan.

=== Danleng County ===
- Two townships: Shiqiao (石桥乡), Shunlong (顺龙乡)
- Six towns: Danleng (丹棱镇), Qile (齐乐镇), Renmei (仁美镇), Shuangqiao (双桥镇), Yangchang (杨场镇), Zhangchang (张场镇)

=== Dongpo District ===
- Six townships: Fusheng (复盛乡), Guangji (广济乡), Jinhua (金花乡), Liusheng (柳圣乡), Pan'ao (盘鳌乡), Tudi (土地乡)
- Seventeen towns: Baima (白马镇), Chongli (崇礼镇), Chongren (崇仁镇), Duoyue (多悦镇), Funiu (富牛镇), Fuxing (复兴镇), Qinjia (秦家镇), Sansu (三苏镇), Shangyi (尚义镇), Simeng (思蒙镇), Songjiang (松江镇), Taihe (太和镇), Wansheng (万胜镇), Xiang'er (象耳镇), Xiuwen (修文镇), Yongshou (永寿镇), Yuexing (悦兴镇)
- Three subdistricts: Dashiqiao (大石桥街道), Suci (苏祠街道), Tonghui (通惠街道)

=== Hongya County ===
- Two townships: Hanwang (汉王乡), Taoyuan (桃源乡)
- Thirteen towns: Caoyutan (槽渔滩镇), Dongyue (东岳镇), Gaomiao (高庙镇), Hongchuan (洪川镇), Huaxi (花溪镇), Jiangjun (将军镇), Liujiang (柳江镇), Sanbao (三宝镇), Wawushan (瓦屋山镇), Yuping (余坪镇), Zhige (止戈镇), Zhongbao (中保镇), Zhongshan (中山镇)

=== Pengshan District ===
- Two townships: Baosheng (保胜乡), Yihe (义和乡)
- Five towns: Gongyi (公义镇), Huangfeng (黄丰镇), Jinjiang (锦江镇), Muma (牧马镇), Wuyang (武阳镇)
- Six subdistricts: Fengming (凤鸣街道), Guanyin (观音街道), Jiangkou (江口街道), Pengxi (彭溪街道), Qinglong (青龙街道), Xiejia (谢家街道)

=== Qingshen County ===
- Two townships: Baiguo (白果乡), Luobo (罗波乡)
- Eight towns: Gaotai (高台镇), Hanyang (汉阳镇), Hebazi (河坝子镇), Heilong (黑龙镇), Nancheng (南城镇), Qingcheng (青城镇), Ruifeng (瑞峰镇), Xilong (西龙镇)

=== Renshou County ===
- Twenty-two townships: Aoling (鳌陵乡), Banyan (板燕乡), Chengyan (城堰乡), Cujin (促进乡), Fengling (凤陵乡), Guansi (关寺乡), Gufo (古佛乡), Hekou (河口乡), Hexing (合兴乡), Hongfeng (洪峰乡), Jingxian (景贤乡), Longqiao (龙桥乡), Qinggang (青岗乡), Shiju (石咀乡), Shuangbao (双堡乡), Songfeng (松峰乡), Tujia (涂加乡), Xiangjia (向家乡), Yachi (鸭池乡), Yucheng (虞丞乡), Zhoajia (兆嘉乡)
- Thirty-seven towns: Banqiao (板桥镇), Baofei (宝飞镇), Baoma (宝马镇), Beidou (北斗镇), Caojia (曹家镇), Cihang (慈航镇), Dahua (大化镇), Fangjia (方家镇), Fujia (富加镇), Gaojia (高家镇), Guiping (贵平镇), Heilongtan (黑龙滩镇), Hejia (禾加镇), Liren (里仁镇), Longma (龙马镇), Longzheng (龙正镇), Lujia (禄加镇), Manjing (满井镇), Nongwang (农旺镇), Outang (藕塘镇), Qingshui (清水镇), Qujiang (曲江镇), Shijian (始建镇), Shijing (识经镇), Sigong (四公镇), Tian'e (天峨镇), Wangyang (汪洋镇), Wengong (文宫镇), Xie'an (谢安镇), Xindian (新店镇), Xingsheng (兴盛镇), Yuantong (元通镇), Yulong (玉龙镇), Zhangjia (彰加镇), Zhonggang (中港乡), Zhongnong (中农镇), Zhongxiang (钟祥镇), Zhujia (珠嘉镇)
- Two subdistricts: Shigao (视高街道), Wenlin (文林街道)

== Mianyang ==
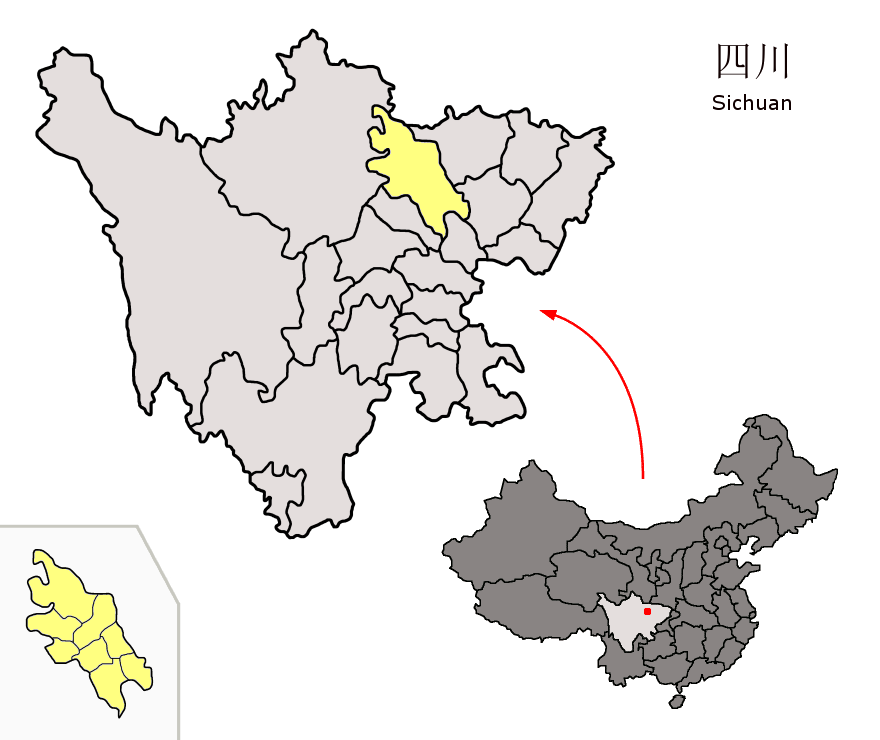
Location of Mianyang and its county-level areas in Sichuan.

=== Anzhou District ===
- Three townships: Gaochuan (高川乡), Xingren (兴仁乡), Yingxin (迎新乡)
- Fifteen towns: Baolin (宝林镇), Duba (杜巴乡), Dunshang (敦上乡), Feishui (沸水镇), Guanling (关岭乡), Heqing (河清镇), Huagai (花荄镇), Huangtu (黄土镇), Jiepai (界牌镇), Jushui (雎水镇), Lexing (乐兴镇), Qianfu (千佛镇), Qingquan (清泉镇), Sangzao (桑枣镇), Tashui (塔水镇), Xiaoba (晓坝镇), Xiushui (秀水镇), Yonghe (永河镇)

=== Beichuan Qiang Autonomous County ===
- Thirteen townships: Badi (坝底乡), Baini (白坭乡), Baishi (白什乡), Douguan (都贯乡), Kaiping (开坪乡), Macao (马槽乡), Piankou (片口乡), Qianpian (青片乡), Taolong (桃龙藏族乡), Xuanping (漩坪乡)
- Twelve towns: Anchang (安昌镇), Chenjiaba (陈家坝镇), Guixi (桂溪镇), Leigu (擂鼓镇), Qushan (曲山镇), Tongkou (通口镇), Tongquan (通泉镇), Xiangquan (香泉镇), Xiaoba (小坝镇), Yong'an (永安镇), Yongchang (永昌镇), Yuli (禹里镇)

=== Fucheng District ===
- One township: Shidong (石洞乡)
- Twelve towns: Fenggu (丰谷镇), Guandi (关帝镇), Heiban (河边镇), Jinfeng (金峰镇), Longmen (龙门镇), Mojia (磨家镇), Qingyi (青义镇), Wujia (吴家镇), Xinzao (新皂镇), Yangjia (杨家镇), Yongxing (永兴镇), Yuhuang (玉皇镇)
- Eleven subdistricts: Chaoyang (朝阳街道), Chengbei (城北街道), Chengjiao (城郊街道), Chengnan (城南街道), Chengxiang (城厢街道), Chuangyeyuan (创业园街道), Gongqu (工区街道), Nanshan (南山街道), Puming (普明街道), Shitang (石塘街道), Tangxun (塘汛街道)

=== Jiangyou ===
- Ten townships: Chongxing (重兴乡), Dong'an (东安乡), Fengshun (枫顺乡), Jingyuan (敬元乡), Liuhe (六合乡), Shiyuan (石元乡), Tongxing (铜星乡), Xinchun (新春乡), Xinxing (新兴乡), Yunji (云集乡)
- Twenty-nine towns: Bayi (八一镇), Chonghua (重华镇), Dakang (大康镇), Dayan (大堰镇), Dongxing (东兴镇), Erlangmiao (二郎庙镇), Fangshui (方水镇), Guanshan (贯山镇), Hanzeng (含增镇), Hekou (河口镇), Houba (厚坝镇), Jiuling (九岭镇), Longfeng (龙凤镇), Majiao (马角镇), Qinglian (青莲镇), Sanhe (三合镇), Shuanghe (双河镇), Taiping (太平镇), Wensheng (文胜镇), Wudu (武都镇), Xiangshui (香水镇), Xiaoxiba (小溪坝镇), Xin'an (新安镇), Xiping (西屏镇), Yanmen (雁门镇), Yixin (义新镇), Yongsheng (永胜镇), Zhangming (彰明镇), Zhanqi (战旗镇)
- Five subdistricts: Changgang (长钢街道), Hanzeng Changgang (含增长钢街道), Huaping (华坪街道), Wudu Changgang (武都长钢街道), Zhongba (中坝街道)

=== Pingwu County ===
- Seventeen townships: Baima (白马藏族乡), Bazi (坝子乡), Doukou (豆叩羌族乡), Gaocun (高村乡), Huangyangguan (黄羊关藏族乡), Huya (虎牙藏族乡), Jiubao (旧堡羌族乡), Kouda (阔达藏族乡), Mupi (木皮藏族乡), Muzuo (木座藏族乡), Pingnan (屏南乡), Pingtong (平通羌族乡), Shuitian (水田乡), Si'er (泗耳藏族乡), Suojiang (锁江羌族乡), Tucheng (土城藏族乡), Xutang (徐塘乡)
- Eight towns: Daqiao (大桥镇), Dayin (大银镇), Gucheng (古城镇), Jiangyouguan (江油关镇), Long'an (龙安镇), Nanba (难波镇), Shuijing (水晶镇), Xiangyan (响岩镇)

=== Santai County ===
- Fourteen townships: Baoquan (宝泉乡), Duanshi (断石乡), Gaoyan (高堰乡), Guangli (广利乡), Jindu (进都乡), Lejia (乐加乡), Shangxin (上新乡), Shuangle (双乐乡), Shuangsheng (双生乡), Shuguang (曙光乡), Xiaxin (下新乡), Xiehe (协和乡), Yuntong (云同乡), Zhongxiao (忠孝乡)
- Forty-nine towns: Anju (安居镇), Badong (八洞镇), Balqing (百顷镇), Beiba (北坝镇), Dongta (东塔镇), Fushun (富顺镇), Guanghui (光辉镇), Guanqiao (观桥镇), Gujing (古井镇), Huayuan (花园镇), Jianping (建平镇), Jianshe (建设镇), Jianzhong (建中镇), Jingfu (景福镇), Jingu (金鼓镇), Jinshi (金石镇), Juhe (菊河镇), Kaihe (凯河镇), Laoma (老马镇), Le'an (乐安镇), Licheng (里程镇), Lingxing (灵兴镇), Lishu (黎曙镇), Liuchi (柳池镇), Liuying (刘营镇), Lixin (立新镇), Longshu (龙树镇), Luban (鲁班镇), Luxi (芦溪镇), Qianfeng (前锋镇), Qijiang (郪江镇), Qiulin (秋林镇), Sanyuan (三元镇), Shi'an (石安镇), Tashan (塔山镇), Tongchuan (潼川镇), Wan'an (万安镇), Xinde (新德镇), Xingfu (幸福镇), Xinlu (新鲁镇), Xinsheng (新生镇), Xiping (西平镇), Yongming (永明镇), Yongxin (永新镇), Yulin (玉林镇), Zhengsheng (争胜镇), Zhongtai (中太镇), Zhongxin (中新镇), Zihe (紫河镇)

=== Yanting County ===
- Twenty-one townships: Chating (茶亭乡), Daxing (大兴回族乡), Fenghe (冯河乡), Huangxi (黄溪乡), Jianhe (剑河乡), Jin'an (金安乡), Juxi (巨溪乡), Lailong (来龙乡), Liangchahe (两岔河乡), Linshan (林山乡), Longquan (龙泉乡), Maogong (毛公乡), Mayang (麻秧乡), Sanyuan (三元乡), Shiniumiao (石牛庙乡), Shuangbei (双碑乡), Wulong (武隆乡), Xinnong (新农乡), Xize (洗泽乡), Zonghai (宗海乡)
- Seventeen towns: Anjia (安家镇), Baizi (柏梓镇), Bajiao (八角镇), Fuyi (富驿镇), Gaodeng (高灯镇), Heiping (黑坪镇), Huangdian (黄甸镇), Jinji (嫘祖镇), Jinkong (金孔镇), Jiulong (九龙镇), Julong (巨龙镇), Lianghe (两河镇), Linnong (林农镇), Xiling (西陵镇), Yongtai (永泰镇), Yulong (玉龙镇), Yunxi (云溪镇), Zhegong (哲贡乡)

=== Youxian District ===
- Three townships: Chaozhen (朝真乡), Fenghuang (凤凰乡), Jianhua (建华乡)
- Twenty towns: Baichan (白蝉镇), Bailin (柏林镇), Chenkang (沉抗镇), Donglin (东林镇), Dongxuan (东宣镇), Guantai (观太镇), Jiezi (街子镇), Liujia (刘家镇), Shiban (石板镇), Shima (石马镇), Songya (松垭镇), Taiping (太平镇), Weicheng (魏城镇), Xiaojian (小枧镇), Xinqiao (新桥镇), Xujia (徐家镇), Yuhe (玉河镇), Yunfeng (云凤镇), Zhongxing (忠兴镇), Zimian (梓棉镇)
- Six subdistricts: Chunlei (春雷街道), Fujiang (涪江街道), Fule (富乐街道), Kexue Cheng Huafeng (科学城华丰街道), Kexue Cheng Songlin (科学城松林街道), Youxian (游仙街道)

=== Zitong County ===
- Thirteen townships: Baoshi (宝石乡), Dingyuan (定远乡), Dongshi (东石乡), Erdong (二洞乡), Huanlong (豢龙乡), Jianxing (建兴乡), Jiaotai (交泰乡), Maying (马迎乡), Sanquan (三泉乡), Shitai (石台乡), Shuangfeng (双峰乡), Xian'e (仙鹅乡), Xiaoya (小垭乡)
- Eighteen towns: Baiyun (白云镇), Changqing (长卿镇), Guanyi (观义镇), Hongren (宏仁镇), Jinlong (金龙镇), Liya (黎雅镇), Maming (马鸣镇), Manao (玛瑙镇), Renhe (仁和镇), Shiniu (石牛镇), Shuangban (双板镇), Wenchang (文昌镇), Wenxing (文兴镇), Wolong (卧龙镇), Xianfeng (仙峰镇), Xuzhou (许州镇), Yanwu (演武镇), Ziqiang (自强镇)

== Nanchong ==
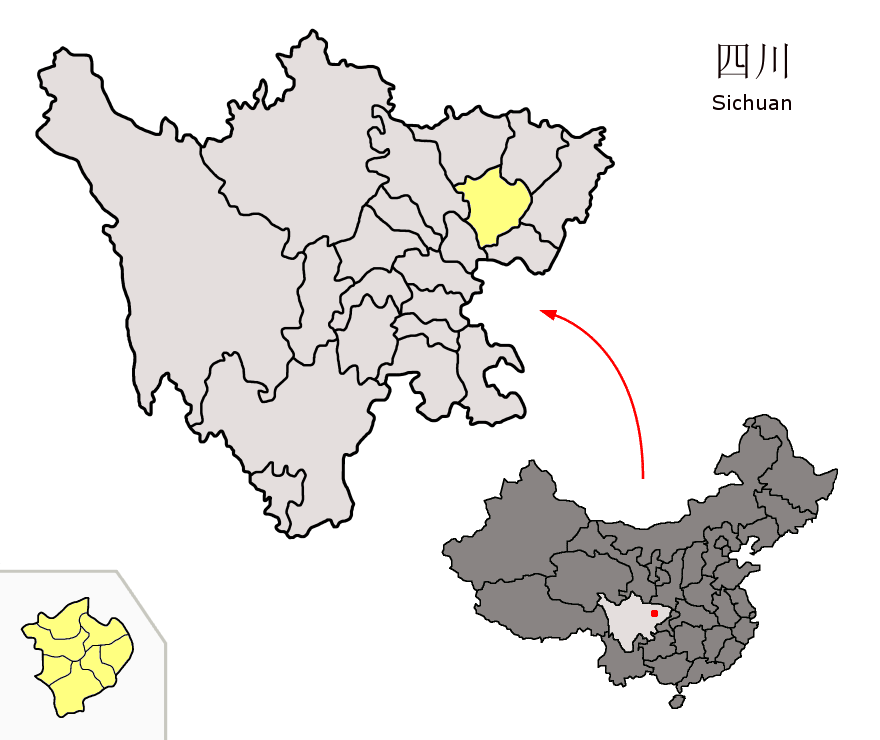
Location of Nanchong and its county-level areas in Sichuan.

=== Gaoping District ===
- Thirteen townships: Banzhu (斑竹乡), Fenghuang (凤凰乡), Fomen (佛门乡), Huangxi (黄溪乡), Longxing (隆兴乡), Majia (马家乡), Nanjiang (南江乡), Qingsong (青松乡), Wanjia (万家乡), Xitou (溪头乡), Yaojia (鄢家乡), Yujia (喻家乡), Yushi (御史乡)
- Eleven towns: Ca'er (擦耳镇), Changle (长乐镇), Dongguan (东观镇), Huilong (会龙镇), Jiangling (江陵镇), Qingju (青居镇), Quejia (阙家镇), Shengguan (胜观镇), Shigui (石圭镇), Yong'an (永安镇), Zouma (走马镇)
- Eight subdistricts: Baita (白塔街道), Dujing (都京街道), Laojun (老君街道), Longmen (龙门街道), Luoxi (螺溪街道), Qinglian (青莲街道), Qingxi (清溪街道), Xiaolong (小龙街道)

=== Jialing District ===
- Eighteen townships: Baijia (白家乡), Daguan (大观乡), Datong (大同乡), Daxing (大兴乡), Jishan (积善乡), Lile (礼乐乡), Linjiang (临江乡), Qiaolong (桥龙乡), Shilou (石楼乡), Shuangdian (双店乡), Taihe (太和乡), Taoyuan (桃园乡), Tianxing (天星乡), Tumen (土门乡), Xinchang (新场乡), Xinmiao (新庙乡), Yakou (雅口乡), Yanxi (盐溪乡), Yishan (移山乡)
- Twenty towns: Anfu (安福镇), Anping (安平镇), Datong (大通镇), Hexi (河西镇), Huaxing (华兴镇), Huayuan (花园镇), Ji'an (吉安镇), Jifeng (集凤镇), Jinbao (金宝镇), Jinfeng (金凤镇), Liba (里坝镇), Lidu (李渡镇), Longling (龙岭镇), Longpan (龙蟠镇), Longquan (龙泉镇), Qibaosi (七宝寺镇), Qushui (曲水镇), Sanhui (三会镇), Shilong (石龙镇), Shiyang (世阳镇), Shuanggui (双桂镇), Yili (一立镇)
- Four subdistricts: Duwei (都尉街道), Huohua (火花街道), Wenfeng (文峰街道), Xixing (西兴街道)

=== Langzhong ===
- Twenty townships: Baotai (宝台乡), Beimen (北门乡), Boshu (博树回族乡), Fangshan (方山乡), Fengzhan (峰占乡), Fuxing (福星乡), Hefeng (鹤峰乡), Helou (河楼乡), Jieyuan (解元乡), Jincheng (金城乡), Jinzi (金子乡), Qiaolou (桥楼乡), Qingquan (清泉乡), Sanmiao (三庙乡), Tianlin (天林乡), Xishan (西山乡), Zaobi (枣碧乡), Zhiping (治平乡), Zhuzhen (朱镇乡)
- Twenty-five towns: Baiya (柏垭镇), Baoma (宝马镇), Dongxing (东兴镇), Erlong (二龙镇), Feifeng (飞凤镇), Hongshan (洪山镇), Jinya (金垭镇), Laoguan (老观镇), Liangshui (凉水镇), Longquan (龙泉镇), Miaogao (妙高镇), Mulan (木兰镇), Pengcheng (彭城镇), Qianfo (千佛镇), Shitan (石滩镇), Shuanglong (双龙镇), Shuiguan (水观镇), Siyi (思依镇), Tiangong (天宫镇), Wangya (望垭镇), Wencheng (文成镇), Wuma (五马镇), Yutai (玉台镇)
- Five subdistricts: Baoning (保宁街道), Hexi (河溪街道), Jiangnan (江南街道), Qili (七里街道), Shaxi (沙溪街道)

=== Nanbu County ===
- Thirty-nine townships: Baocheng (宝城乡), Bilong (碧龙乡), Dafu (大富乡), Dayan (大研乡), Dianya (店垭乡), Guangzhong (光中乡), Hanpo (寒坡乡), Hedong (河东镇), Hongguan (宏观乡), Huofeng (火峰乡), Liushu (柳树乡), Liuyi (柳驿乡), Longmiao (龙庙乡), Mawang (马旺乡), Meijia (梅家乡), Nianpan (碾盘乡), Nianya (碾垭乡), Pingqiao (平桥乡), Qianqiu (千秋乡), Qiuya (丘垭乡), Qunlong (群龙乡), Sanqing (三清乡), Shiquan (石泉乡), Shuangfeng (双峰乡), Silong (四龙乡), Taihua (太华乡), Taixia (太霞乡), Tiebian (铁边乡), Wuling (五灵乡), Xiaojia (肖家乡), Xiaoyuan (小元乡), Xihe (西河乡), Xingsheng (兴盛乡), Xiongshi (雄狮乡), Yaochang (窑场乡), Yonghong (永红乡), Yongqing (永庆乡), Yuzhen (玉镇乡), Zaojiao (皂角乡), Zhongxin (中心乡)
- Thirty-four towns: Ba'erhu (八尔湖镇), Beiyuan (碑院镇), Changping (长坪镇), Dahe (大河镇), Daping (大坪镇), Daqiao (大桥镇), Dawang (大王镇), Dingshui (定水镇), Dongba (东坝镇), Fuhu (伏虎镇), Fuli (富利镇), Heba (河坝镇), Huaguan (花罐镇), Huangjin (黄金镇), Jianxing (建兴镇), Laoya (老鸦镇), Liuma (流马镇), Nanmu (楠木镇), Panlong (盘龙镇), Sanguan (三官镇), Shenba (神坝镇), Shengshui (升水镇), Shengzhong (升钟镇), Shihe (石河镇), Shilong (石龙镇), Shuangfo (双佛镇), Tiefotang (铁佛塘镇), Tongping (桐坪镇), Wangjia (王家镇), Wannian (万年镇), Xiehe (谢河镇), Xishui (西水镇), Yongding (永定镇)
- Four subdistricts: Binjiang (滨江街道), Manfu (满福街道), Nanlong (南隆街道), Shubei (蜀北街道)

=== Peng'an County ===
- Twenty-three townships: Bixi (碧溪乡), Changliang (长梁乡), Chating (茶亭乡), Fengshi (凤石乡), Gaomiao (高庙乡), Haitian (海田乡), Jidu (济渡乡), Jinjia (金甲乡), Kaiyuan (开元乡), Lianglu (两路乡), Liutan (柳滩乡), Nanyan (南燕乡), Pingtou (平头乡), Qilong (骑龙乡), Qunle (群乐乡), Sanba (三坝乡), Shikong (石孔乡), Shiliang (石梁乡), Tiancheng (天成乡), Xiandian (鲜店乡), Xinhe (新河乡), Xinyuan (新园乡), Zhujia (诸家乡)
- Fifteen towns: Fude (福德镇), Heshu (河舒镇), Jinping (锦屏镇), Jinxi (金溪镇), Julong (巨龙镇), Lixi (利溪镇), Longcan (龙蚕镇), Longyun (龙云镇), Luojia (罗家镇), Muba (睦坝镇), Xingwang (兴旺镇), Xujia (徐家镇), Yangjia (杨家镇), Yinhan (银汉镇), Zhengyuan (正源镇)
- One subdistrict: Xiangru (相如街道)

=== Shunqing District ===
- Eight townships: Dengtai (灯台乡), Fandian (梵殿乡), Fengshan (凤山乡), Guihua (桂花乡), Longgui (龙桂乡), Shunhe (顺河乡), Tongren (同仁乡), Xinfu (新复乡)
- Nine towns: Dalin (大林镇), Gongxing (共兴镇), Huijing (辉景镇), Jintai (金台镇), Lijia (李家镇), Luxi (芦溪镇), Shuangqiao (双桥镇), Yongfeng (永丰镇), Yuxi (渔溪镇)
- Eleven subdistricts: Banzeng (搬罾街道), Beicheng (北城街道), Dongnan (东南街道), Hepinglu (和平路街道), Huafeng (华凤街道), Jingxi (荆溪街道), Wufeng (舞凤街道), Xicheng (西城街道), Xinjian (新建街道), Yingxi (潆溪街道), Zhongcheng (中城街道)

=== Xichong County ===
- Twenty-seven townships: Chelong (车龙乡), Dailin (岱林乡), Dongdai (东岱乡), Dongtai (东太乡), Fenghe (凤和乡), Fu'an (复安乡), Fujun (扶君乡), Guanfeng (观凤乡), Guanya (罐垭乡), Hongqiao (宏桥乡), Huaguang (华光乡), Jinquan (金泉乡), Jinshan (金山乡), Jinyuan (金源乡), Liqiao (李桥乡), Qinglong (青龙乡), Shuangjiang (双江乡), Shuangluo (双洛乡), Tongde (同德乡), Xianglong (祥龙乡), Xinlan (西碾乡), Yihe (义和乡), Yongqing (永清乡), Zhanshan (占山乡), Zhongling (中岭乡), Zhongnan (中南乡), Ziyan (紫岩乡)
- Sixteen towns: Changlin (常林镇), Daquan (大全镇), Duofu (多扶镇), Fengming (凤鸣镇), Gaoyuan (高院镇), Guanwen (关文镇), Gulou (古楼镇), Huaishi (槐树镇), Lianchi (莲池镇), Minglong (鸣龙镇), Qingshi (青狮镇), Renhe (仁和镇), Shuangfeng (双凤镇), Taiping (太平镇), Xianlin (仙林镇), Yixing (义兴镇)
- One subdistrict: Jincheng (晋城街道)

=== Yilong County ===
- Twenty-six townships: Bajiao (芭蕉乡), Banqiao (板桥乡), Biquan (碧泉乡), Chaijing (柴井乡), Dafeng (大风乡), Daluo (大罗乡), Dengta (灯塔乡), Fengyi (凤仪乡), Fulin (福临乡), Guanghua (光华乡), Hezuo (合作乡), Jiulong (九龙乡), Juguang (炬光乡), Laiyi (来仪乡), Laomu (老木乡), Lexing (乐兴乡), Longqiao (龙桥乡), Mengya (檬垭乡), Qiuya (秋垭乡), Shifo (石佛乡), Shuangpan (双盘乡), Shuangqing (双庆乡), Tonggu (铜鼓乡), Wupeng (武棚乡), Yimen (义门乡), Zhongba (中坝乡)
- Thirty towns: Baoping (保平镇), Dayin (大寅镇), Dayi (大仪镇), Dingziqiao (丁字桥镇), Erdao (二道镇), Fuxing (复兴镇), Guanzi (观紫镇), Huichun (回春镇), Jincheng (金城镇), Lishan (立山镇), Liuya (柳垭镇), Ma'an (马鞍镇), Rixing (日兴镇), Saijin (赛金镇), Sanhe (三河镇), Sanjiao (三蛟镇), Shuangsheng (双胜镇), Side (思德镇), Tumen (土门镇), Wazi (瓦子镇), Wenxing (文星镇), Wufu (五福镇), Xianfeng (先锋镇), Xinzheng (新政镇), Yangqiao (杨桥镇), Yilu (义路镇), Yongguang (永光镇), Yongle (永乐镇), Zhanggong (张公镇), Zhouhe (周河镇)
- One subdistrict: Dumen (度门街道)

=== Yingshan County ===
- Thirty-one townships: Angu (安固乡), Anhua (安化乡), Bailin (柏林乡), Baiping (柏坪乡), Daihe (带河乡), Damiao (大庙乡), Fatang (法堂乡), Fengchan (丰产乡), Fuyuan (福源乡), Gaoma (高码乡), Hexing (合兴乡), Kongque (孔雀乡), Liangfeng (凉风乡), Linglong (玲珑乡), Liuhe (六合乡), Longfu (龙伏乡), Mingde (明德乡), Muding (木顶乡), Puling (普岭乡), Qijian (七涧乡), Qingshui (清水乡), Qingyuan (清源乡), Sanyuan (三元乡), Shuanglin (双林乡), Shuangxi (双溪乡), Sixi (四喜乡), Taipeng (太蓬乡), Tongtian (通天乡), Yongquan (涌泉乡), Yuezhong (悦中乡), Zengchan (增产乡)
- Twenty towns: Chapan (茶盘镇), Dongsheng (东升镇), Huangdu (黄渡镇), Huilong (回龙镇), Jichuan (济川镇), Laolin (老林镇), Liaoye (蓼叶镇), Lingjiu (灵鹫镇), Lujing (渌井镇), Luoshi (骆市镇), Lushui (绿水镇), Muya (木垭镇), Qingshan (青山镇), Sanxing (三兴镇), Shuangliu (双流镇), Xiaoqiao (小桥镇), Xiaoshui (消水镇), Xindian (新店镇), Xinghuo (星火镇), Xiqiao (西桥镇)
- Two subdistricts: Chengnan (城南街道), Langchi (朗池街道)

== Neijiang ==
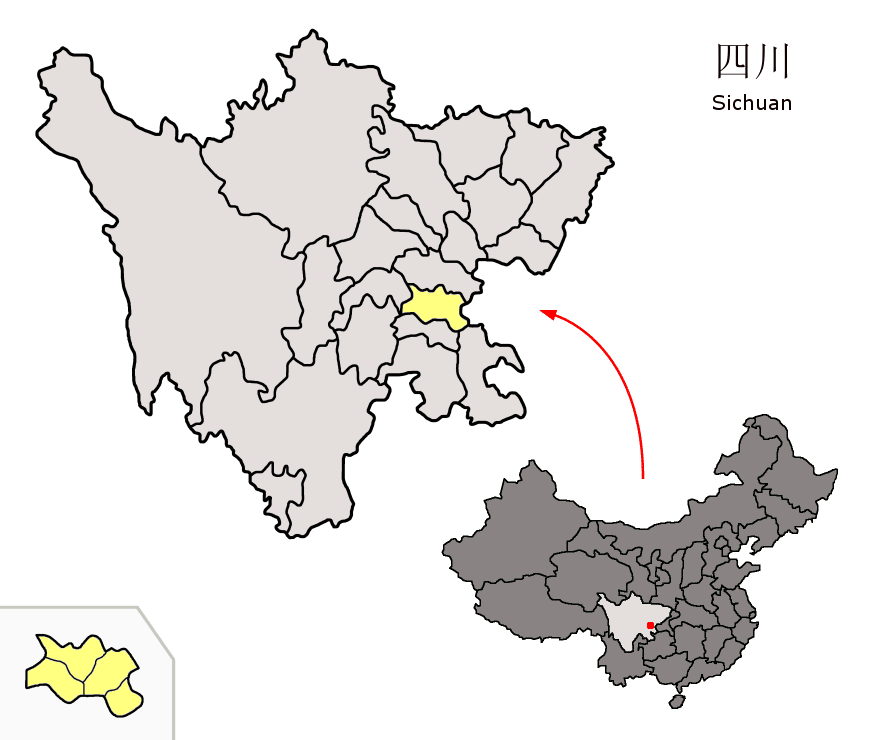
Location of Neijiang and its county-level areas in Sichuan.

=== Dongxing District ===
- Five townships: Beinan (卑南乡), Dazhi (大治乡), Sujia (苏家乡), Tai'an (太安乡), Xindian (新店乡)
- Nineteen towns: Baihe (白合镇), Beimu (碑木镇), Fuxi (富溪镇), Gaoliang (高梁镇), Guobei (郭北镇), Liuqiao (柳桥镇), Pingtan (平坦镇), Sanlie (三烈镇), Shizi (石子镇), Shuangcai (双才镇), Shuangqiao (双桥镇), Shunhe (顺河镇), Tianjia (田家镇), Tongfu (同福镇), Xiaohekou (小河口镇), Yangjia (杨家镇), Yongfu (永福镇), Yongxing (永兴镇), Zhongshan (中山镇)
- Five subdistricts: Dongxing (东兴街道), Gaoqiao (高桥街道), Shengli (胜利街道), Xilin (西林街道), Xinjiang (新江街道)

=== Longchang ===
- Seventeen towns: Guihuajing (桂花井镇), Huangjia (黄家镇), Hujia (胡家镇), Jieshi (界市镇), Lishi (李市镇), Longshi (龙市镇), Purun (普润镇), Shanchuan (山川镇), Shengdeng (圣灯镇), Shinian (石碾镇), Shiyanqiao (石燕桥镇), Shuangfeng (双凤镇), Xiangshi (响石镇), Yingxiang (迎祥镇), Yujian (渔箭镇), Yunding (云顶镇), Zhouxing (周兴镇)
- Two subdistricts: Guhu (古湖街道), Jin'e (金鹅街道)

=== Shizhong District ===
- Three township: Fulong (福隆乡), Sihe (四合乡), Tuojiang (沱江乡)
- Eleven towns: Baima (白马镇), Chaoyang (朝阳镇), Fengming (凤鸣镇), Gongjia (龚家镇), Jiaotong (交通镇), Jingmin (靖民镇), Lingjia (凌家镇), Longmen (龙门镇), Quan'an (全安镇), Shijia (史家镇), Yong'an (永安镇)
- Seven subdistricts: Chengdong (城东街道), Chengnan (城南街道), Chengxi (城西街道), Haozikou (壕子口街道), Lexian (乐贤街道), Pailou (牌楼街道), Yuxi (玉溪街道)

=== Weiyuan County ===
- Twenty towns: Donglian (东联镇), Gaoshi (高石镇), Guanyingtan (观英滩镇), Huangjinggou (黄荆沟镇), Jiepai (界牌镇), Jinghe (靖和镇), Lianghe (两河镇), Lianjie (连界镇), Longhui (龙会镇), Puziwan (铺子湾镇), Qingwei (庆卫镇), Shanwang (山王镇), Wanchang (碗厂镇), Xiangyi (向义镇), Xiaohe (小河镇), Xinchang (新场镇), Xindian (新店镇), Yanling (严陵镇), Yuexi (越溪镇), Zhenxi (镇西镇)

=== Zizhong County ===
- Thirty-three towns: Banliya (板栗桠镇), Chenjia (陈家镇), Chonglong (重龙镇), Falun (发轮镇), Ganlu (甘露镇), Gaolou (高楼镇), Gongmin (公民镇), Guide (归德镇), Jinlijing (金李井镇), Liuma (骝马镇), Longjiang (龙江镇), Longjie (龙结镇), Longshan (龙山镇), Laoquan (罗泉镇), Ma'an (马鞍镇), Mengtang (孟塘镇), Mingxinsi (明心寺镇), Peilong (配龙镇), Qiuxi (球溪镇), Shizi (狮子镇), Shuanghe (双河镇), Shuanglong (双龙镇), Shuinan (水南镇), Shunhechang (顺河场镇), Songjia (宋家镇), Sujiawan (苏家湾镇), Taiping (太平镇), Tiefo (铁佛镇), Xinglongjie (兴隆街镇), Xinqiao (新桥镇), Yinshan (银山镇), Yuxi (鱼溪镇), Zouma (走马镇)

== Ngawa Tibetan and Qiang Autonomous Prefecture ==
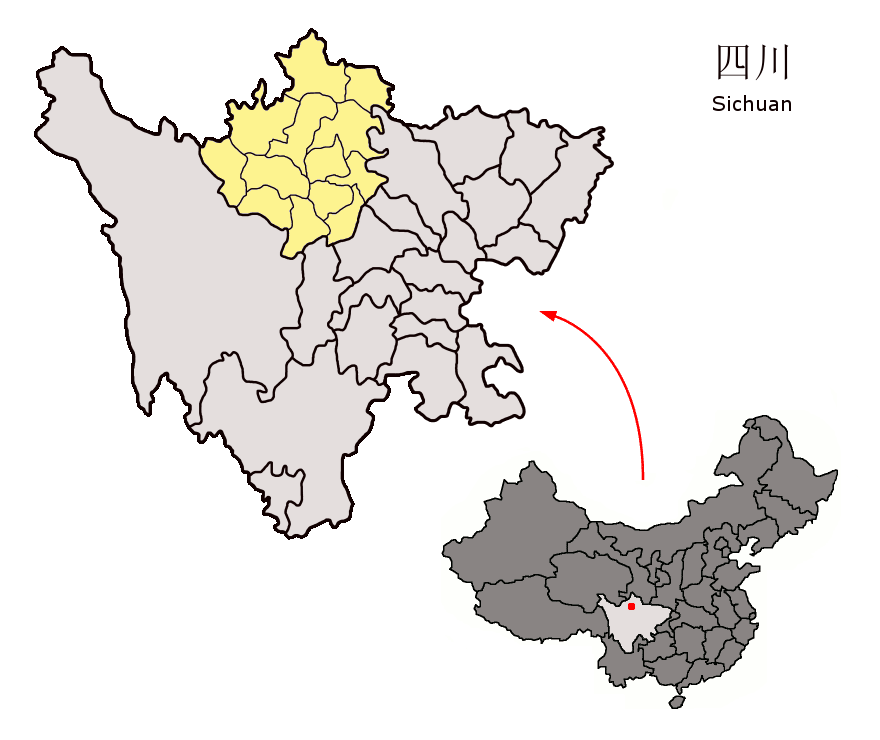
Location of Ngawa Tibetan and Qiang Autonomous Prefecture and its county-level areas in Sichuan.

=== Barkam (Ma'erkang City) ===
- Ten townships: Baiwan (白湾乡), Caodeng (草登乡), Dangba (党坝乡), Dazang (大藏乡), Jiaomuzu (脚木足乡), Kangshan (康山乡), Long'erjia (龙尔甲乡), Mu'erzong (木尔宗乡), Ribu (日部乡) Suomo (梭磨乡)
- Three towns: Ma'erkang (马尔康镇), Sha'erzong (沙尔宗镇), Songgang (松岗镇)

=== Heishui County ===
- Ten townships: Ciba (慈坝乡), Hongyan (红岩乡), Longba (龙坝乡), Luoduo (洛多乡), Mawo (麻窝乡), Qinglang (晴朗乡), Shidiaolou (石碉楼乡), Shuangliusuo (双溜索乡), Waboliangzi (瓦钵乡), Weigu (维古乡)
- Eight towns: Kalong (卡龙镇), Luhua (芦花镇), Musu (木苏镇), Se'ergu (色尔古镇), Shashiduo (沙石多镇), Xi'er (西尔镇), Zhawo (扎窝镇), Zhimulin (知木林镇)

=== Hongyuan County ===
- Five townships: Amu (阿木乡), Cha'erma (查尔玛乡), Jiangrong (江茸乡), Maiwa (麦洼乡), Rangkou (壤口乡)
- Six towns: Anqu (安曲镇), Longri (龙日镇), Qiongxi (邛溪镇), Sedi (色地镇), Shuajingsi (刷经寺镇), Waqie (瓦切镇)

=== Jinchuan County ===
- Eighteen townships: Akeli (阿科里乡), Dusong (独松乡), Ere (俄热乡), Ergali (二嘎里乡), Ge'er (咯尔乡), Hedong (河东乡), Hexi (河西乡), Jimu (集沐乡), Kalajiao (卡拉脚乡), Kasa (卡撒乡), Ma'erbang (马尔邦乡), Maori (毛日乡), Qingning (宁乡), Sawajiao (撒瓦脚乡), Sha'er (沙耳乡), Taiyanghe (太阳河乡). Wanlin (万林乡), Zengda (曾达乡)
- Three towns: Anning (安宁), Guanyinqiao (观音桥), Jinchuan (金川镇), Lewu (雷武), Manai (马奈镇)

=== Jiuzhaigou County ===
- Thirteen townships: Anle (安乐镇), Baihe (白河乡), Baohua (保华乡), Caodi (草地乡), Dalu (大录乡), Gaoyuan (郭元乡), Lingjiang (陵江乡), Luoyi (罗依乡), Majia (马家乡), Yongfeng (永丰镇), Yonghe (永和乡), Yongle (永乐镇), Yuwa (玉瓦乡)
- Five towns: Heihe (黑河镇), Nanping (南坪镇), Shuanghe (双河镇), Wujiao (勿角镇), Zhangzha (漳扎镇)

=== Li County ===
- Seven townships: Ganbao (甘堡乡), Jiabi (甲壁乡), Muka (木卡乡), Puxi (蒲溪乡), Shangmeng (上孟乡), Tonghua (通化乡), Xiameng (下孟乡)
- Six towns: Gu'ergou (古尔果), Miyaluo (米亚罗), Potou (莆头), Taoping (桃坪) Xuecheng (学城), Zagunao (杂谷脑)

=== Mao County ===
- Nine townships: Baixi (白溪乡), Feihong (飞虹乡), Huilong (回龙乡), Sanlong (三龙乡), Songpinggou (松坪沟乡), Shidaguan (石大关乡), Qugu (曲谷乡), Yadu (雅都乡), Yonghe (永和乡)
- Nine towns: Chibusi (赤不苏镇), Diexi (叠溪镇), Dongxing (东兴镇), Fengyi (凤仪镇), Fushun (富顺镇), Goukou (沟口镇), Guangming (光明镇), Heihu (黑虎镇), Nanxin (南新镇), Shaba (沙坝镇), Taiping (太平镇), Tumen (土门镇), Wadi (洼底镇), Weimen (渭门镇) Yadu (雅都镇)

=== Ngawa County (Aba County) ===
- Thirteen townships: Andou (安斗乡), Chali (查理乡), Dege (德格乡), Jia'erdou (甲尔多乡), Kehe (柯河乡), Kuasha (垮沙乡), Longzang (龙藏乡), Luo'erda (洛尔达乡), Maikun (麦昆乡), Qiujima (求吉玛乡), Rong'an (茸安乡), Siwa (四洼乡), Wa'erma (哇尔玛乡)
- Six towns: Aba (阿坝镇), Anqiang (安羌镇), Gemo (各莫镇), Hezhi (河支镇), Jialuo (贾洛镇), Mai'erma (麦尔玛镇)

=== Songpan County ===
- Nineteen townships: Anhong (安宏乡), Baiyang (白羊乡), Caoyuan (草源乡), Daxing (大姓乡), Dazhai (大寨乡), Hongzha (红扎乡), Huanglong (黄龙乡), Jin'an (进安回族乡), Minjiang (岷江乡), Mouni (牟尼乡), Shanba (山巴乡), Shangbazhai (上坝寨乡), Shijiabao (施家堡乡), Shili (十里回族乡), Shuijing (水晶乡), Xiabazhai (下八寨乡), Xiaoxing (小姓乡), Yanyun (燕云乡), Zhenping (镇坪乡)
- Seven towns: Chuanzhusi (川主寺镇), Hongtu (红土镇), Jin'an (进安镇), Mao'ergai (毛儿盖镇), Qingyun (青云镇), Xiaohe (小河镇), Zhenjiangguan (镇江关镇)

=== Wenchuan County ===
- Five townships: Caopo (草坡乡), Keku (克枯乡), Longxi (龙溪乡), Yanmen (雁门乡), Yinxing (银杏乡)
- Nine towns: Bazhou (灞州镇), Gengda (耿达镇), Miansi (绵虒镇), Sanjiang (三江镇), Shuimo (水磨镇), Weizhou (威州镇), Wolong (卧龙镇), Xuankou (漩口镇), Yingxiu (映秀镇)

=== Xiaojin County ===
- Fourteen townships: Chongde (崇德乡), Fubian (抚边乡), Hanniu (汗牛乡), Jiesi (结斯乡), Laoying (老营乡), Meiwo (美沃乡), Mupo (木坡乡), Pan’an (潘安乡), Ri’er (日尔乡), Shalong (沙龙乡), Shuangbai (双柏乡), Wodi (窝底乡), Xinge (新格乡), Xinqiao (新桥乡)
- Eight towns: Bajiao (八角镇), Dawei (达维镇), Lianghekou (两河镇), Meixing (美兴镇), Rilong (日隆镇), Siguniangshan (四姑娘山镇), Wori (沃日镇), Zhailong (宅垄镇)

=== Zamtang County (Rangtang County) ===
- Eight townships: Gaduo (尕多乡), Puxi (蒲西乡), Rongmuda (茸木达乡), Shangduke (上杜柯乡), Shangrangtang (上壤塘乡), Shili (石里乡), Wuyi (吾伊乡), Zongke (宗科乡)
- Four towns: Gangmuda (岗木达镇), Nanmuda (南木达镇), Zhongrangtang (中壤塘镇), Rangke (让克镇)

=== Zoigê County (Ruo'ergai County) ===
- Elveven townships: Axirong (阿西茸乡), Banyou (班佑乡), Baozuo (包座乡), Chong'er (崇尔乡), Donglie (冻列乡), Jiangzha (降扎乡), Maixi (麦溪乡), Nenwa (嫩哇乡), Qiuji (求吉乡), Re'er (热尔乡), Zhanwa (占哇乡)
- Six towns: Axi (阿西镇), Baxi (巴西镇), Dazhasi (达扎寺镇), Hongxing (红星镇), Tangke (唐克镇), Tiebu (铁布镇), Xiaman (辖曼镇)

== Panzhihua ==
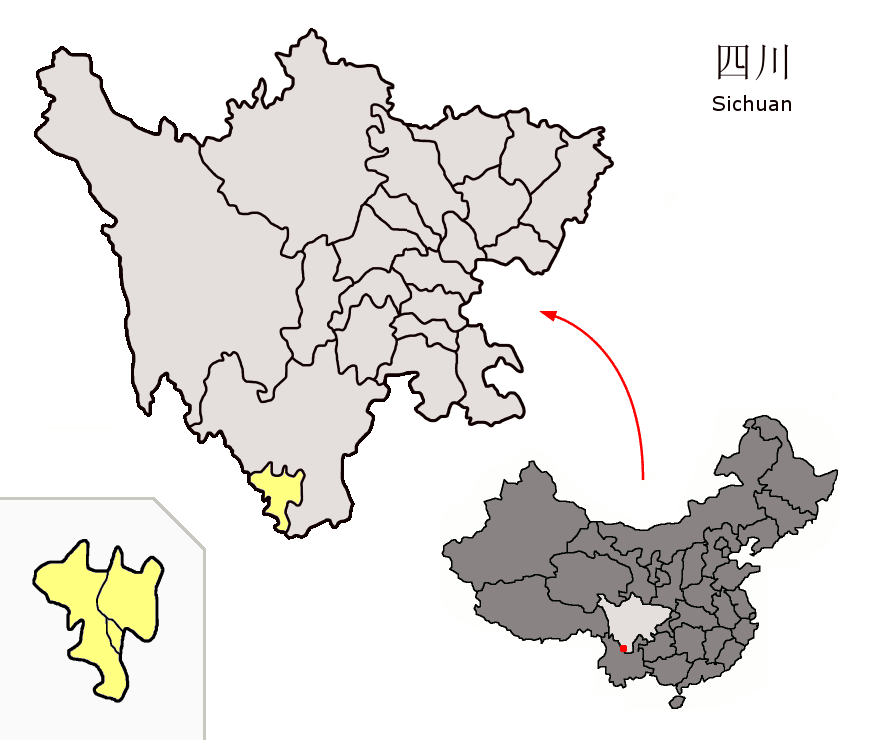
Location of Panzhihua in its county-level areas in Sichuan.

=== Dong District ===
- One town: Yinjiang (银江镇)
- Nine subdistricts: Bingcaogang (炳草岗街道), Changshoulu (长寿路街道), Dadukou (大渡口街道), Guaziping (瓜子坪街道), Midi (密地街道), Nanshan (南山街道), Nongnongping (弄弄坪街道), Xiangyangcun (向阳村街道), Zaoziping (枣子坪街道)

=== Miyi County ===
- Four townships: Baipo (白坡彝族乡), Malong (麻陇彝族乡), Wanqiu (湾丘彝族乡), Xinshan (新山傈僳族乡)
- Eight towns: Baima (白马镇), Binggu (丙谷镇), Caochang (草场镇), Deshi (得石镇), Panlian (攀莲镇), Puwei (普威镇), Salian (撒莲镇), Yakou (雅口镇)

=== Renhe District ===
- Six townships: Ala (啊喇彝族乡), Dalongtan (大龙潭彝族乡), Taiping (太平乡), Wuben (务本乡), Zhongba (中坝乡), Zongfa (宗发乡)
- Eight towns: Bude (布德镇), Datian (大田镇), Futian (福田镇), Jinjiang (金江镇), Pingdi (平地镇), Qianjin (前进镇), Renhe (仁和镇), Tongde (同德镇)
- One subdistrict: Dahezhongliu (大河中路街道)

=== Xi District ===
- One town: Geliping (格里坪镇)
- Six subdistricts: Dabaoding (大宝鼎街道), Hemenkou (河门口街道), Mosouhe (摩梭河街道), Qingxiangping (清香坪街道), Taojiadu (陶家渡街道), Yuquan (玉泉街道)

=== Yanbian County ===
- Ten townships: Ganyu (鳡鱼彝族乡), Gesala (格萨拉彝族乡), Gonghe (共和乡), Guosheng (国胜乡), He'ai (和爱彝族乡), Hongbao (红宝苗族彝族乡), Hongguo (红果彝族乡), Qinghe (箐河傈僳族乡), Wenquan (温泉彝族乡), Yimin (益民乡)
- Six towns: Hongge (红格镇), Huimin (惠民镇), Tongzilin (桐子林镇), Xinjiu (新九镇), Yongxing (永兴镇), Yumen (渔门镇)

== Suining ==
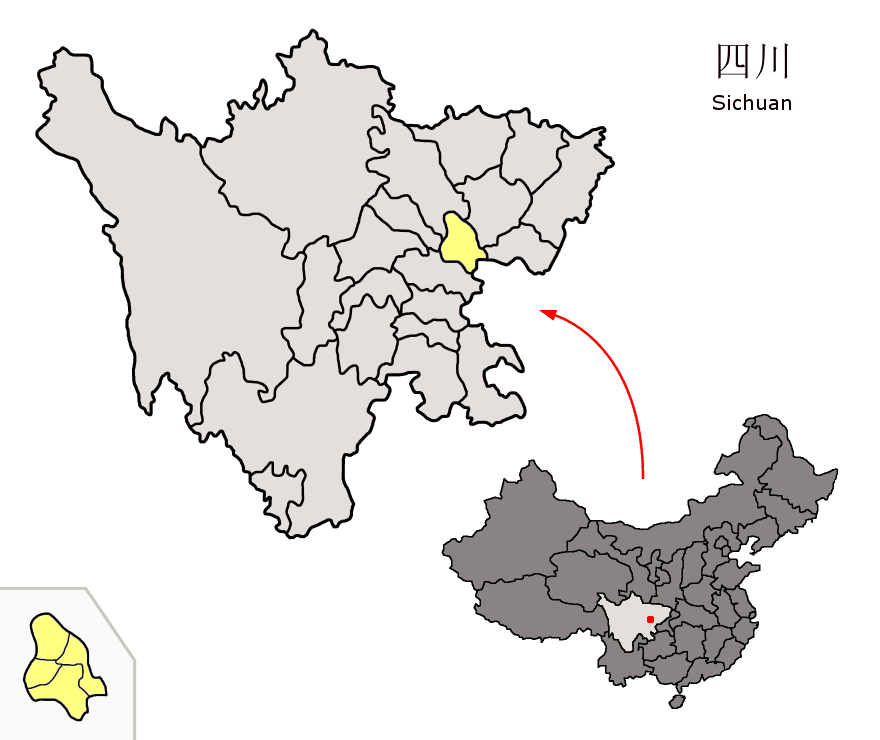
Location of Suining and its county-level areas in Sichuan.

=== Anju District ===
- Four townships: Buyun (步云乡), Da'an (大安乡), Lianhua (莲花乡), Majia (马家乡)
- Seventeen towns: Anju (安居镇), Baima (白马镇), Baoshi (保石镇), Changli (常理镇), Dongchan (东禅镇), Fenshui (分水镇), Guanyin (观音镇), Hengshan (横山镇), Huilong (会龙镇), Juxian (聚贤镇), Lanjiang (拦江镇), Moxi (磨溪镇), Sanjia (三家镇), Shidong (石洞镇), Ximei (西眉镇), Yufeng (玉丰镇), Zhongxing (中兴镇)

=== Chuanshan District ===
- One township: Tangjia (唐家乡)
- Ten towns: Baosheng (保升镇), Beigu (北固镇), Fuqiao (复桥镇), Guihua (桂花镇), Hesha (河沙镇), Laochi (老池镇), Longfeng (龙凤镇), Renli (仁里镇), Xinqiao (新桥镇), Yongxing (永兴镇)
- Fourteen subdistricts: Ciyin (慈音街道), Fuyuanlu (富源路街道), Gaoshengjie (高升街街道), Guangde (广德街道), Jiahe (嘉禾街道), Jiefulu (介福路街道), Jiulian (九莲街道), Kaixuanlu (凯旋路街道), Linquan (灵泉街道), Longping (龙坪街道), Nanjinlu (南津路街道), Xining (西宁街道), Yucalu (育才路街道), Zhenjiangsi (镇江寺街道)

=== Daying County ===
- Two townships: Tongxian (通贤乡), Zhishui (知水乡)
- Nine towns: Hebian (河边镇), Huima (回马镇), Jinyuan (金元镇), Longsheng (隆盛镇), Penglai (蓬莱镇), Tianbao (天保镇), Xiangshan (象山镇), Yufeng (玉峰镇), Zhuotongjing (卓筒井镇)

=== Pengxi County ===
- Twelve townships: Banqiao (板桥乡), Gaosheng (高升乡), Heye (荷叶乡), Huangni (黄泥乡), Huishui (回水乡), Jinlong (金龙乡), Luoge (罗戈乡), Nongxing (农兴乡), Qunli (群力乡), Xiadong (下东乡), Xinsheng (新胜乡), Xinxing (新星乡)
- Nineteen towns: Baofan (宝梵镇), Changle (常乐镇), Chicheng (赤城镇), Dashi (大石镇), Gaoping (高坪镇), Hongjiang (红江镇), Huaihua (槐花镇), Jinqiao (金桥镇), Jinxiang (吉祥镇), Jixing (吉星镇), Mingfeng (鸣凤镇), Mingyue (明月镇), Pengnan (蓬南镇), Qunli (群利镇), Renlong (任隆镇), Sanfeng (三凤镇), Tianfu (天福镇), Wenjing (文井镇), Xinhui (新会镇)

=== Shehong ===
- Seven townships: Fuhe (伏河乡), Jinhe (金鹤乡), Qingdi (青堤乡), Shuangxi (双溪乡), Taixing (太兴乡), Wanlin (万林乡), Yutai (玉太乡)
- Twenty-two towns: Caobei (曹碑镇), Chengu (陈古镇), Dayu (大榆镇), Dongyue (东岳镇), Fenglai (凤来镇), Jinhua (金华镇), Jiujia (金家镇), Juhe (瞿河镇), Mingxing (明星镇), Qinggang (青岗镇), Renhe (仁和镇), Taiyi (太乙镇), Tianxian (天仙镇), Tongshe (潼射镇), Tuopai (沱牌镇), Wensheng (文升镇), Xiangshan (香山镇), Yangxi (洋溪镇)
- Two subdistrict: Ping'an (平安街道), Taihe (太和街道)

== Ya'an ==
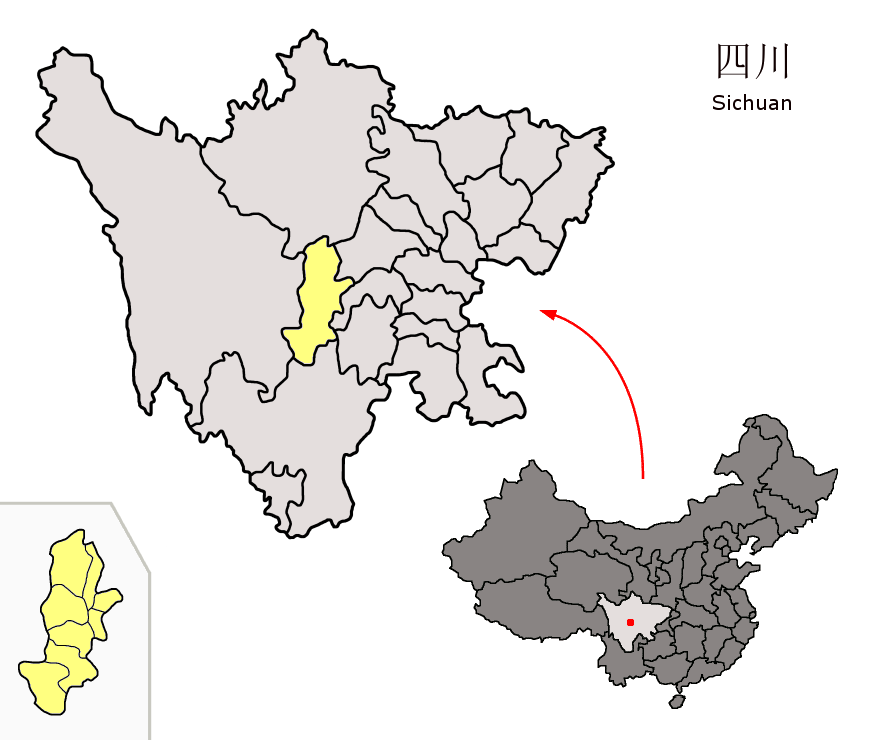
Location of Ya'an and its county-level areas in Sichuan.

=== Baoxing County ===
- Six townships: Daxi (大溪乡), Fengtongzhai (蜂桶寨乡), Mingli (明里乡), Qiaoqi (硗碛乡), Wulong (五龙乡), Yongfu (永福乡)
- Three towns: Lingguan (灵关镇), Longdong (陇东镇), Muping (穆坪镇)

=== Hanyuan County ===
- Twenty-eight townships: Baiyan (白岩乡), Daling (大岭乡), Datian (大田乡), Dayan (大堰乡), Fuchun (富春乡), Fuxiang (富乡乡), Guixian (桂贤乡), Henan (河南乡), Hexi (河西乡), Houyu (后域乡), Jianli (建黎乡), Lianghe (两河乡), Liaolin (料林乡), Liyuan (梨园乡), Malie (马烈乡), Nimei (坭美彝族乡), Pianma (片马彝族乡), Qingfu (青富乡), Sanjiao (三交乡), Shaijing (晒经乡), Shirong (市荣乡), Shuangxi (双溪乡), Shunhe (顺河彝族乡), Wangong (万工乡), Wanli (万里乡), Xiaobao (小堡藏族彝族乡), Xixi (西溪乡), Yongli (永利彝族乡)
- Twelve towns: Anle (安乐镇), Dashu (大树镇), Fulin (富林镇), Fuquan (富泉镇), Fuzhuang (富庄镇), Huangmu (皇木镇), Jiuxiang (九襄镇), Qianyu (前域镇), Qingxi (清溪镇), Tangjia (唐家镇), Wusihe (乌斯河镇), Yidong (宜东镇)

=== Lushan County ===
- Two townships: Baosheng (宝盛乡), Qingren (清人乡)
- Six towns: Dachuan (大川镇), Feixianguan (飞仙关镇), Longmen (龙门镇), Shuangshi (双石镇), Siyan (思延镇), Taiping (太平镇)
- One subdistrict: Luyang (芦阳街道)

=== Mingshan District ===
- Seven townships: Chengdong (城东乡), Hongyan (红岩乡), Jianshan (建山乡), Jiefang (解放乡), Lianjiang (联江乡), Liaochang (廖场乡), Shuanghe (双河乡)
- Eleven towns: Baizhang (百丈镇), Cheling (车岭镇), Heizhu (黑竹镇), Hongxing (红星镇), Maling (马岭镇), Maohe (茅河镇), Mengdingshan (蒙顶山镇), Qianjin (前进镇), Wangu (万古镇), Xindian (新店镇), Zhongfeng (中峰镇)
- Two subdistricts: Mengyang (蒙阳街道), Yongxing (永兴街道)

=== Shimian County ===
- Fourteen townships: Anshun (安顺乡), Caluo (卡洛乡), Caoke (草科藏族乡), Fengle (丰乐乡), Liziping (栗子坪彝族乡), Tianwen (田湾乡), Wajiao (瓦角乡), Wanggangping (王岗坪彝族藏族乡), Xianfeng (咸丰乡), Xieluo (蟹螺藏族乡), Xinmin (新民藏族彝族乡), Yingzheng (迎政乡), Yonghe (永和乡), Zaiyang (载阳乡)
- Three towns: Anshunchang (安顺场镇), Huilong (回隆镇), Meiluo (美罗镇)
- Two subdistricts: Miancheng (绵城街道), Xinmian (新棉街道)

=== Tianquan County ===
- Nine townships: Daping (大坪乡), Duogong (多功乡), Laochang (老场乡), Leying (乐英乡), Lianglu (两路乡), Xingye (兴业乡), Xinhua (新华乡), Yuquan (鱼泉乡), Zishi (紫石乡)
- Seven towns: Chengxiang (城厢镇), Labahe (喇叭河镇), Renyi (仁义镇), Shiyang (始阳镇), Sijing (思经镇), Xiaohe (小河镇), Xinchang (新场镇)

=== Yingjing County ===
- Fourteen townships: Anjing (安靖乡), Baofeng (宝峰彝族乡), Datianba (大田坝乡), Fucheng (附城乡), Lieshi (烈士乡), Lietai (烈太乡), Liuhe (六合乡), Minjian (民建彝族乡), Sanhe (三河乡), Siping (泗坪乡), Tianfeng (天凤乡), Xinjian (新建乡), Xinmiao (新庙乡), Yanzhu (烟竹乡)
- Seven towns: Huatan (花滩镇), Longgcanggou (龙苍沟镇), Niubeishan (牛背山镇), Qinglong (青龙镇), Wuxianxiang (五宪乡镇), Xintian (新添镇), Yinghe (荥河镇)
- One subdistrict: Yandao (严道街道)

=== Yucheng District ===
- Four townships: Fengming (凤鸣乡), Guanhua (观化乡), Kongping (孔坪乡), Nanjiao (南郊乡)
- Fourteen towns: Babu (八步镇), Beijiao (北郊镇), Bifengxia (碧峰峡镇), Caoba (草坝镇), Duiyan (对岩镇), Duoyang (多营镇), Hejiang (合江镇), Shangli (上里镇), Shaping (沙坪镇), Wangyu (望鱼镇), Yanchang (晏场镇), Yanqiao (严桥镇), Zhongli (中里镇), Zhougongshan (周公山镇)
- Five subdistricts: Daxing (大兴街道), Dongcheng (东城街道), Hebei (河北街道), Qingjiang (青江街道), Xicheng (西城街道)

== Yibin ==
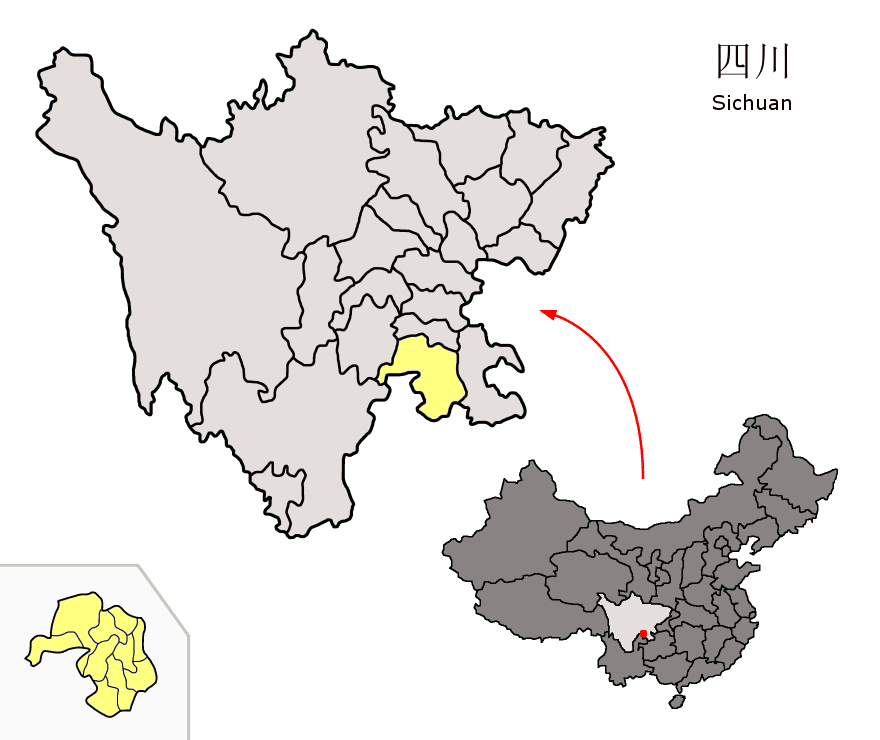
Location of Yibin and its county-level areas in Sichuan.

=== Changning County ===
- Four townships: Guanxing (冠兴乡), Fuxing (富兴乡), Sanyuan (三元乡), Taoping (桃坪乡)
- Fourteen towns: Changning (长宁镇), Dongdi (硐底镇), Guhe (古河镇), Huatan (花滩镇), Jingjiang (井江镇), Kaifo (开佛镇), Laoweng (老翁镇), Longtou (龙头镇), Meibai (梅白镇), Meidong (梅硐镇), Shuanghe (双河镇), Tonggu (铜鼓镇), Tongluo (铜锣镇), Zhuhai (竹海镇)

=== Cuiping District ===
- Two townships: Shigu (石鼓乡), Wangchang (王场乡)
- Eighteen towns: Baihua (白花镇), Caiba (菜坝镇), Gaodian (高店镇), Jinping (金坪镇), Jinqiuhu (金秋湖镇), Kongtan (孔滩镇), Liangjiang (两江镇), Liduan (李端镇), Lizhuang (李庄镇), Mingwei (名尾镇), Mouping (牟坪镇), Qiuchang (秋场镇), Shuangyi (双谊镇), Sipo (思坡镇), Songjia (宋家镇), Yongxing (永兴镇), Zongchang (宗场镇)
- Twelve subdistricts: Anfu (安阜街道), Baishawan (白沙湾街道), Beicheng (北城街道), Daguanlou (大观楼街道), Dongcheng (东城街道), Hejiangmen (合江门街道), Nancheng (南城街道), Shaping (沙坪街道), Shuangcheng (双城街道), Xiangbi (象鼻街道), Xicheng (西城街道), Xijiao (西郊街道)

=== Gao County ===
- Five townships: Shuanghe (双河乡), Silie (四烈乡), Yangtian (羊田乡), Yingxi (潆溪乡), Zantan (趱滩乡)
- Fourteen towns: Dawo (大窝镇), Fuxing (复兴镇), Jiale (嘉乐镇), Jiaocun (蕉村镇), Kejiu (可久镇), Laifu (来复镇), Luochang (罗场镇), Luorun (落润镇), Qingfu (庆符镇), Qingling (庆岭镇), Shahe (沙河镇), Shengtian (胜天镇), Wenjiang (文江镇), Yuejiang (月江镇)

=== Gong County ===
- Six townships: Guandou (观斗苗族乡), Hengfeng (恒丰乡), Luodu (罗渡苗族乡), Renyi (仁义乡) Shibei (石碑乡), Yuhe (玉和苗族乡)
- Eleven towns: Caoying (曹营镇), Didong (底洞镇), Gongquan (珙泉镇), Luobiao (洛表镇), Luohai (洛亥镇), Mutan (沐滩镇), Shangluo (上罗镇), Wangjia (王家镇), Xiaoluo (下罗镇), Xiao'er (孝儿镇), Xunchang (巡场镇)

=== Jiang'an County ===
- Two township: Lanba (兰坝乡), Panlong (蟠龙乡)
- Eighteen towns: Dajing (大井镇), Damiao (大妙镇), Dipeng (底蓬镇), Hongqiao (红桥镇), Jiang'an (江安镇), Jingkou (井口镇), Liugeng (留耕镇), Renhe (仁和镇), Shuiqing (水清镇), Simianshan (四面山镇), Tieqing (铁清镇), Tongzi (桐梓镇), Wukuang (五矿镇), Xiachang (下长镇), Xijiashan (夕佳山镇), Yangchun (阳春镇), Yile (怡乐镇), Ying'an (迎安镇)

=== Junlian County ===
- Ten townships: Fengle (丰乐乡), Gaokan (高坎乡), Gaoping (高坪苗族乡), Kongque (孔雀乡), Leyi (乐义乡), Lianhe (联合苗族乡), Longzhen (龙镇乡), Tangba (塘坝乡), Tuanlin (团林苗族乡), Wude (武德乡)
- Nine towns: Daxueshan (大雪山镇), Haoba (蒿坝镇), Mu'ai (沐爱镇), Shuangteng (双腾镇), Tengda (腾达镇), Weixin (维新镇), Xunsi (巡司镇), Yunlian (筠连镇), Zhenzhou (镇舟镇)

=== Nanxi District ===
- Eight towns: Changxing (长兴镇), Daguan (大观镇), Huangsha (黄沙镇), Jiangnan (江南镇), Liujia (刘家镇), Peishi (裴石镇), Wangjia (汪家镇), Xianlin (仙临镇)
- Two subdistricts: Luolong (罗龙街道), Nanxi (南溪街道)
- Four townships: Daping (大坪乡), Linfeng (临风乡), Liubin (刘斌乡), Majia (马家乡)

=== Pingshan County ===
- Eight townships: Longxi (龙溪乡), Loudong (娄东乡), Pingbian (屏边彝族乡), Qingping (清平彝族乡), Taiping (太平乡), Xiaxi (夏溪乡), Xinfa (新发乡), Yachi (鸭池乡)
- Ten towns: Dacheng (大乘镇), Furong (富荣镇), Fuyan (扶延镇), Jinping (锦屏镇), Longhua (龙华镇), Pingshan (屏山镇), Shulou (书楼镇), Xin'an (新安镇), Xinshi (新市镇), Zhongdu (中都镇)

=== Xingwen County ===
- Five townships: Daba (大坝苗族乡), Dahe (大河苗族乡), Qilin (麒麟苗族乡), Xianfeng (仙峰苗族乡), Yuxlu (毓秀苗族乡)
- Ten towns: Bowangshan (僰王山镇), Gongle (共乐镇), Gusong (古宋镇), Jiusicheng (九丝城镇), Lianhua (莲花镇), Shihai (石海镇), Taiping (太平镇), Wuxing (五星镇), Yuping (玉屏镇), Zhoujia (周家镇)

=== Xuzhou District ===
- Three townships: Fengyi (凤仪乡), Longchi (龙池乡), Longxing (龙兴乡)
- Nineteen towns: Anbian (安边镇), Fulong (福隆镇), Gaochang (高场镇), Guanyin (观音镇), Gubai (古白镇), Guluo (古洛镇), Hengjiang (横江镇), Heshi (合什镇), Juexi (蕨溪镇), Lichang (李昌镇), Liujia (柳嘉镇), Nanguang (南广镇), Ninan (泥南镇), Nixi (泥溪镇), Pu'an (普安镇), Shangzhou (商州镇), Shuanglong (双龙镇), Xijie (西街镇), Zhanghai (樟海镇)
- Three subdistricts: Baixi (柏溪街道), Nan'an (南岸街道), Zhaochang (赵场街道)

== Zigong ==
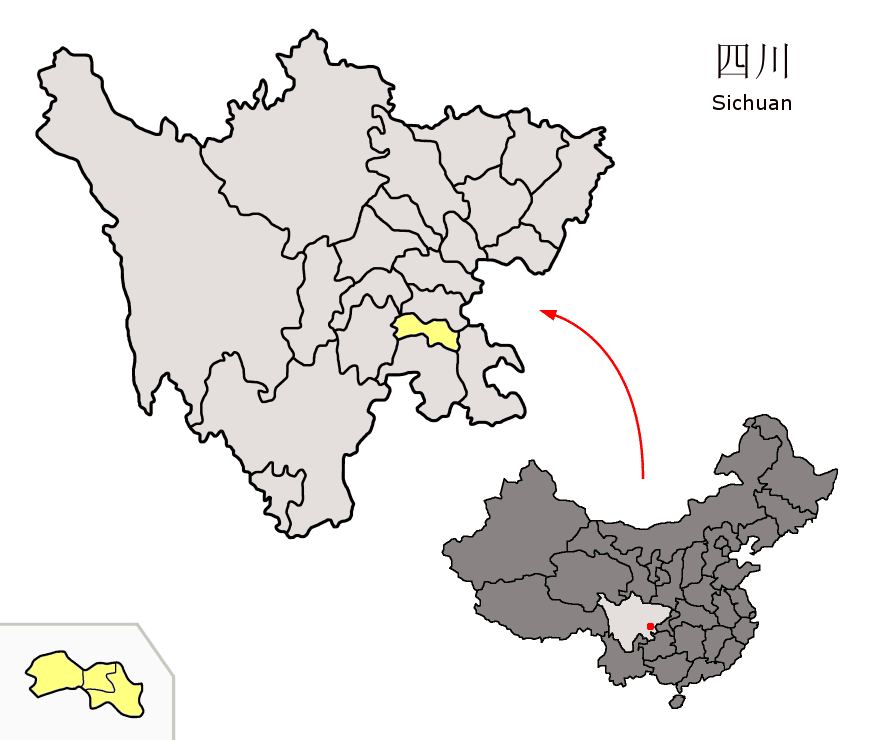
Location of Zigong and its county-level areas in Sichuan.

=== Da'an District ===
- One township: Yongjia (永嘉乡)
- Nine towns: Dashanpu (大山铺镇), Heshi (何市镇), Huilong (回龙镇), Miaoba (庙坝镇), Niufo (牛佛镇), Sanduozhai (三多寨镇), Tuanjie (团结镇), Xindian (新店镇), Xinmin (新民镇)
- Six subdistricts: Da'an (大安街道), Fenghuang (凤凰街道), Heping (和平街道), Lianggaoshan (凉高山街道), Longjing (龙井街道), Machongkou (马冲口街道)

=== Fushun County ===
- Four townships: Baoqing (宝庆乡), Fuhe (富和乡), Longwan (龙万乡), Shidao (石道乡)
- Twenty-one towns: Anxi (安溪镇), Banqiao (板桥镇), Changtan (长滩镇), Daisi (代寺镇), Doushan (兜山镇), Feilong (飞龙镇), Fushan (福善镇), Gufo (古佛镇), Huaide (怀德镇), Huzhu (互助镇), Liqiao (李桥镇), Pengmiao (彭庙镇), Pipa (彭庙镇), Qilong (骑龙镇), Shishi (狮市镇), Tongsi (童寺镇), Wangjia (王家镇), Wanshou (万寿镇), Yongnian (永年镇), Zhaohua (化镇), Zhongshi (中石镇)
- Three subdistricts: Dengjingguan (登景关街道), Donghu (东湖街道), Fushi (富世街道)

=== Gongjing District ===
- Two townships: Niuwei (牛尾乡), Zhangjia (章佳乡)
- Eight towns: Aiye (艾叶镇), Baimiao (白庙镇), Chengjia (成佳镇), Jianshe (建设镇), Lianhua (莲花镇), Longtan (龙潭镇), Qiaotou (桥头镇), Wubao (五宝镇)
- Three subdistricts: Changtu (长土街道), Gongjing (贡井街道), Xiaoxi (筱溪街道)

=== Rong County ===
- Six townships: Fuxing (复兴乡), Gujia (古佳乡), Jinhua (金花乡), Leiyin (雷音乡), Molin (墨林乡), Yujia (于佳乡)
- Nineteen towns: Baohua (保华镇), Changshan (长山镇), Dingxin (鼎新镇), Dongjia (东佳镇), Dongxing (东兴镇), Dujia (度佳镇), Gaoshan (高山镇), Guanshan (观山镇), Guwen (古文镇), Hekou (河口镇), Laimou (来牟镇), Lede (乐德镇), Liujia (留佳镇), Shuanggu (双古镇), Shuangshi (双石镇), Tiechang (铁厂镇), Xinqiao (新桥镇), Xuyang (旭阳镇), Zhengzi (正紫镇)
- One subdistrict: Qingyan (青阳街道)

=== Yantan District ===
- Two townships: Jiuhong (九洪乡), Liushan (柳山乡)
- Nine towns: Fuquan (富全镇), Huangshi (黄市镇), Lianluo (联络镇), Wangjing (王井镇), Washi (瓦市镇), Xianshi (仙市镇), Xinglong (兴隆镇), Yantan (沿滩镇), Yong'an (永安镇)
- Two subdistricts: Dengguan (邓关街道), Weiping (卫坪街道)

=== Ziliujing District ===
- Two townships: Nongtuan (弄团乡), Qishu (七树乡)
- Three towns: Feilongxia (飞龙峡镇), Rongbian (荣边镇), Zhongquan (仲权镇)
- Nine subdistricts: Dangui (丹桂街道), Dongxinsi (东兴寺街道), Gaofeng (高峰街道), Guojia'aojie (郭家坳街街道), Hongqi (红旗街道), Shuping (舒坪街道), Wuxingjie (五星街街道), Xinjie (新街街道), Xueyuan (学苑街道)

== Ziyang ==
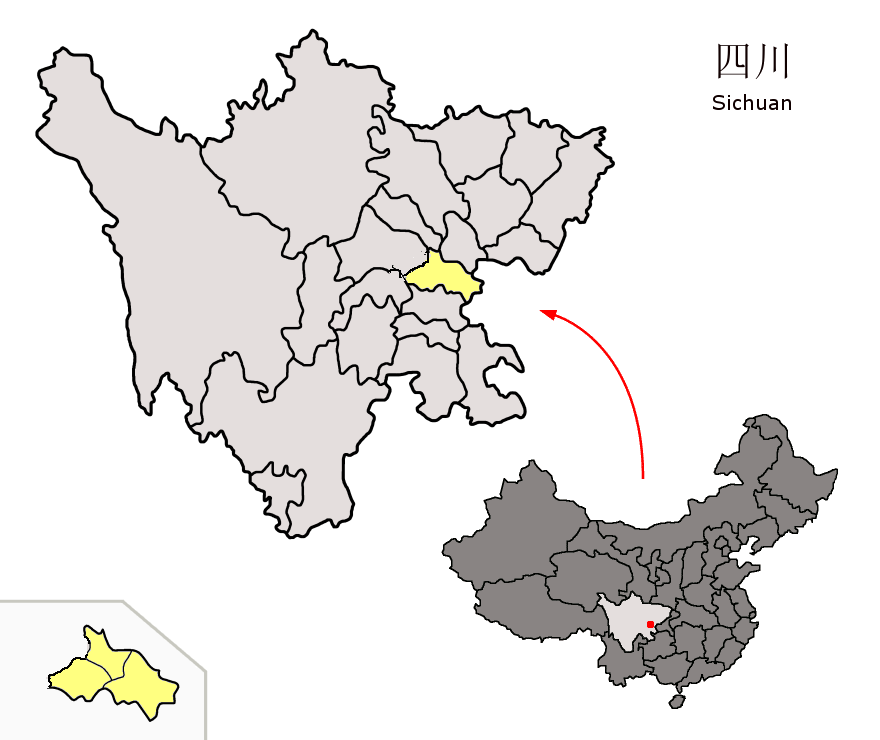
Location of Ziyang and its county-level areas in Sichuan.

=== Anyue County ===
- Thirty-five townships: Baishui (白水乡), Baitasi (白塔寺乡), Bamiao (八庙乡), Baohua (宝华乡), Chengbei (城北乡), Chengxi (城西乡), Danian (大埝乡), Dingxin (顶新乡), Dongsheng (东胜乡), Gaosheng (高升乡), Gaowu (高屋乡), Gonghe (共和乡), Gongqiao (拱桥乡), Hengmiao (横庙乡), Heping (和平乡), Heyi (合义乡), Jianhua (建华乡), Jiulong (九龙乡), Laifeng (来凤乡), Longqiao (龙桥乡), Nuli (努力乡), Pianyan (偏岩乡), Pinghe (坪河乡), Qianfo (千佛乡), Ruiyun (瑞云乡), Shigu (石鼓乡), Shuanglongjie (双龙街乡), Tianbao (天宝乡), Tianma (天马乡), Tuanjie (团结乡), Yuelai (悦来乡), Yuexin (岳新乡), Yueyuan (岳源乡), Yulong (鱼龙乡), Yunfeng (云峰乡), Zizhi (自治乡)
- Thirty-three towns: Changheyuan (长河源镇), Chaoyang (朝阳镇), Daping (大平镇), Huayan (华严镇), Hujian (护建镇), Hulong (护龙镇), Liangbanqiao (两板桥镇), Lijia (李家镇), Linfeng (林凤镇), Longtai (龙台镇), Maojia (毛家镇), Nanxun (南薰镇), Qianlong (乾龙镇), Qingliu (清流镇), Renhe (人和镇), Shiyang (石羊镇), Sixian (思贤镇), Tianlin (天林镇), Tongxian (通贤镇), Wenhua (文化镇), Wofu (卧佛镇), Xiehe (协和镇), Xinglong (兴隆镇), Xunlong (驯龙镇), Yaoshi (姚市镇), Yongqing (永清镇), Yongshun (永顺镇), Yuanba (元坝镇), Yuanda (鸳大镇), Yueyang (阳镇), Zhenzi (镇子镇), Zhongyi (忠义镇), Zhouli (周礼镇)
- One subdistrict: Shiqiao (石桥街道)

=== Lezhi County ===
- Six townships: Fangsheng (放生乡), Kongque (孔雀乡), Liangshui (凉水乡), Longxi (龙溪乡), Quansheng (全胜乡), Shuanghechang (双河场乡)
- Eighteen towns: Baolin (宝林镇), Dafo (大佛镇), Dongshan (东山镇), Foxing (佛星镇), Gaosi (高寺镇), Huilan (回澜镇), Jinshun (金顺镇), Laodong (劳动镇), Liang'an (良安镇), Longmen (龙门镇), Panlong (蟠龙镇), Shengchi (盛池镇), Shifo (石佛镇), Shituan (石湍镇), Tongjia (童家镇), Tonglu (通旅镇), Zhonghechang (中和场镇), Zhongtian (中天镇)
- One subdistrict: Tianchi (天池街道)

=== Yanjiang District ===
- Two townships: Huilong (回龙乡), Xinchang (新场乡)
- Twenty towns: Baohe (保和镇), Baotai (宝台镇), Beiji (碑记镇), Danshan (丹山镇), Dongfeng (东峰镇), Fengyu (丰裕镇), Kanjia (堪嘉镇), Laojun (老君镇), Linjiang (临江镇), Nanjin (南津镇), Qingshui (清水镇) Shiling (石岭镇), Songtao (松涛镇), Wuhuang (伍隍镇), Xiangfu (祥符镇), Xiaoyuan (小院镇), Yanjiang (雁江镇), Yingjie (迎接镇), Zhonghe (中和镇), Zhongyi (忠义镇)
- Four subdistricts: Lianhua (莲花街道), Sanxianci (三贤祠街道), Shizishan (狮子山街道), Zixi (资溪街道)
