= Huilong =

Huilong (回龙 unless otherwise noted) may refer to the following locations in China:

== Towns ==
- Huilong, Anhui (会龙镇), in Funan County
- Huilong, Dazu District, Chongqing
- Huilong, Liangping County, Chongqing
- Huilong, Deqing County, Guangdong
- Huilong, Gaoyao, Guangdong
- Huilong, Heyuan, in Longchuan County, Guangdong
- Huilong, Shaoguan, in Xinfeng County, Guangdong
- Huilong, Xingren County, Guizhou
- Huilong, Zunyi, in Xishui County, Guizhou
- Huilong, Hebei (回隆镇), in Wei County, Handan
- Huilong, Hanchuan, Xiaogan, Hubei
- Huilong, Shaanxi, in Zhen'an County
- Huilong, Kaijiang County, Sichuan
- Huilong, Nanchong (会龙镇), in Gaoping District, Nanchong, Sichuan
- Huilong, Qionglai, Sichuan
- Huilong, Suining (会龙镇), in Anju District, Suining, Sichuan
- Huilong, Yingshan County, Sichuan
- Huílóng, Zhongjiang County, Sichuan
- Huìlóng, Zhongjiang County (会龙镇), Sichuan
- Huilong, Zigong, in Da'an District, Zigong, Sichuan

== Townships ==
- Huilong Township, Fujian, in Jianyang
- Huilong Township, Henan, in Tongbai County
- Huilong Township, Hubei, in Fang County, Shiyan, Hubei
- Huilong Township, Hunan, in Yongshun County
- Huilong Township, Shanxi, in Jiaokou County
- Huilong Township, Mao County, Sichuan
- Huilong Township, Mianning County, Sichuan
- Huilong Township, Ziyang, in Yanjiang District, Ziyang, Sichuan
- Huilong Yi Ethnic Township (回隆彝族乡), Shimian County, Sichuan

== See also ==
- Huilong station (disambiguation)
- Shanghai Jiading Huilong F.C., a Chinese football club based in Jiading District, Shanghai
