= Tianbao Township, Ziyang =

Tianbao Township 天宝乡
- Township
- Tianbaoxiang
- Location in Sichuan
- Coordinates: 29°52′20″N 105°20′21″E
- Country: People's Republic of China
- Province: Sichuan
- Prefecture-level city: Ziyang
- County: Anyue County

Area
  - Total: 30.69 km^{2} (11.85 sq mi)

Population (2010)
  - Total: 10,483
  - Density: 341.6/km^{2} (884.7/sq mi)
- Time zone: UTC+8 (China Standard)

Tianbao (Chinese: 天宝乡) is a township in Anyue County, Ziyang, Sichuan, China. In 2010, Tianbao Township had a total population of 10,483: 5,430 males and 5,053 females: 2,188 aged under 14, 6,874 aged between 15 and 65 and 1,491 aged over 65.
