= Ziyang (disambiguation) =

Ziyang (资阳市) is a city in Sichuan province, China.

Ziyang or Tzu-yang may also refer to:

== Places ==
- Ziyang County (陕西省 安康市 紫阳县), in Ankang, Shaanxi, China
- Ziyang, Yiyang (湖南省 益阳市 资阳区), in Yiyang, Hunan, China

== Person ==
- Zhao Ziyang (赵紫阳; 1919–2005), Chinese politician
