= Lianhua Subdistrict =

Lianhua Subdistrict may refer to several subdistricts of China, including:

- Lianhua Subdistrict, Changyi District, Jilin (city), Jilin (province)
- Lianhua Subdistrict, Futian District, Shenzhen, Guangdong
- Lianhua Subdistrict, Xixia County, Nanyang, Henan
- Lianhua Subdistrict, Xiangcheng, Zhoukou, Henan
- Lianhua Subdistrict, Yanjiang District, Ziyang, Sichuan
