= Cangshan =

Cangshan may refer to the following locations in China:

- Cangshan County (苍山县), Shandong
- Cangshan District (仓山区), Fuzhou, Fujian
  - Cangshan, Cangshan District (仓山镇), town in said district
- Cang Mountain (苍山), mountain range in Dali Prefecture, Yunnan
- Cangshan, Sichuan (仓山镇), town in Zhongjiang County
