= Zixi Subdistrict =

Zixi 资溪街道
- Subdistrict
- Location of Zixi Subdistrict within Sichuan
- Coordinates: 30°06′51″N 104°38′44″E
- Country: People's Republic of China
- Province: Sichuan
- Prefecture-level city: Ziyang
- District: Yanjiang

Population (2010)
  - Total: 83,356
- Time zone: UTC+8 (China Standard)

Zixi Subdistrict (simplified Chinese: 资溪街道; traditional Chinese: 資溪街道; pinyin: Zīxī Jiēdào) is the most populous subdistrict within Yanjiang District, Ziyang, Sichuan Province, China. As of 2010, Zixi had a population of 83,356 people.

== History ==
The district was created in 2005 by order of the Sichuan Provincial Government as part of a reshuffling of Yanjiang District.

== Administrative divisions ==
Zixi is divided into 11 residential communities:

- Qiaotingzi Residential Community (桥亭子社区)
- Bajiaojing Residential Community (八角井社区)
- Hongfeng Residential Community (鸿丰社区)
- Huangnijing Residential Community (黄泥井社区)
- Jiuquhe Residential Community (九曲河社区)
- Guihuajing Residential Community (桂花井社区)
- Shiyuan Residential Community (师园社区)
- Yannan Residential Community (雁南社区)
- Nanjun Residential Community (南骏社区)
- Ximenqiao Residential Community (西门桥社区)
- Zixi Residential Community (资溪社区).
