= Ziyang railway station =

Railway station in Ziyang, China

Ziyang 资阳
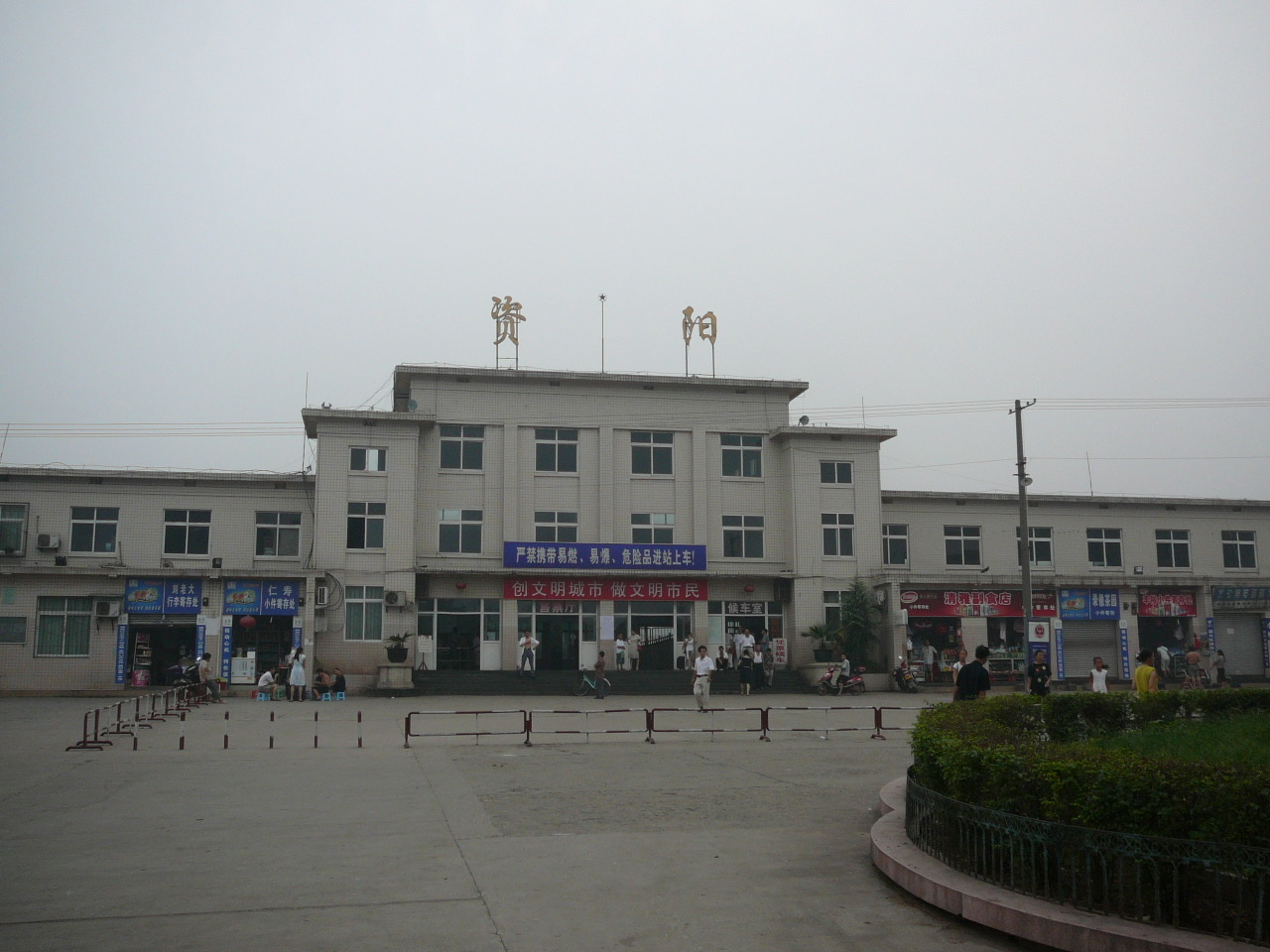

General information
- Location: Yanjiang District, Ziyang, Sichuan; China
- Operated by: Chengdu Railway Bureau, China Railway Corporation
- Line(s): Chengdu–Chongqing Railway

History
- Opened: 1953

Ziyang railway station (Chinese: 资阳站; pinyin: Zīyáng Zhàn) is a railway station of Chengdu–Chongqing Railway. The station is located in Yanjiang District, Ziyang, Sichuan, China.

== See also ==
- Ziyang North railway station

Preceding station	China Railway	Following station
Mochiba towards Chengdu	Chengdu–Chongqing railway	Houjiaping towards Chongqing
