= Huilong Township, Ziyang =

Huilong Township 回龙乡
- Township
- Location in Sichuan
- Coordinates: 30°05′03″N 104°58′46″E
- Country: People's Republic of China
- Province: Sichuan
- Prefecture-level city: Ziyang
- District: Yanjiang
- Village-level divisions: 1 residential community 14 villages

Area
  - Total: 61.30 km^{2} (23.67 sq mi)
- Elevation: 432 m (1,417 ft)

Population (2018)
  - Total: 29,101
  - Density: 474.7/km^{2} (1,230/sq mi)
- Time zone: UTC+8 (China Standard)

Huilong Township (simplified Chinese: 回龙乡; traditional Chinese: 回龍鄉; pinyin: Huílóng Xiāng) is a township of Yanjiang District, Ziyang, Sichuan, People's Republic of China, located 32 kilometres (20 mi) east of downtown Ziyang. As of 2011, it has one residential community (居委会) and 14 villages under its administration. The township spans an area of 61.30 square kilometres (23.67 mi^{2}), and has a hukou population of 29,101 as of 2018.

== See also ==
- List of township-level divisions of Sichuan
