= Zigong North railway station =

Railway station in Zigong, Sichuan

Zigong North 自贡北
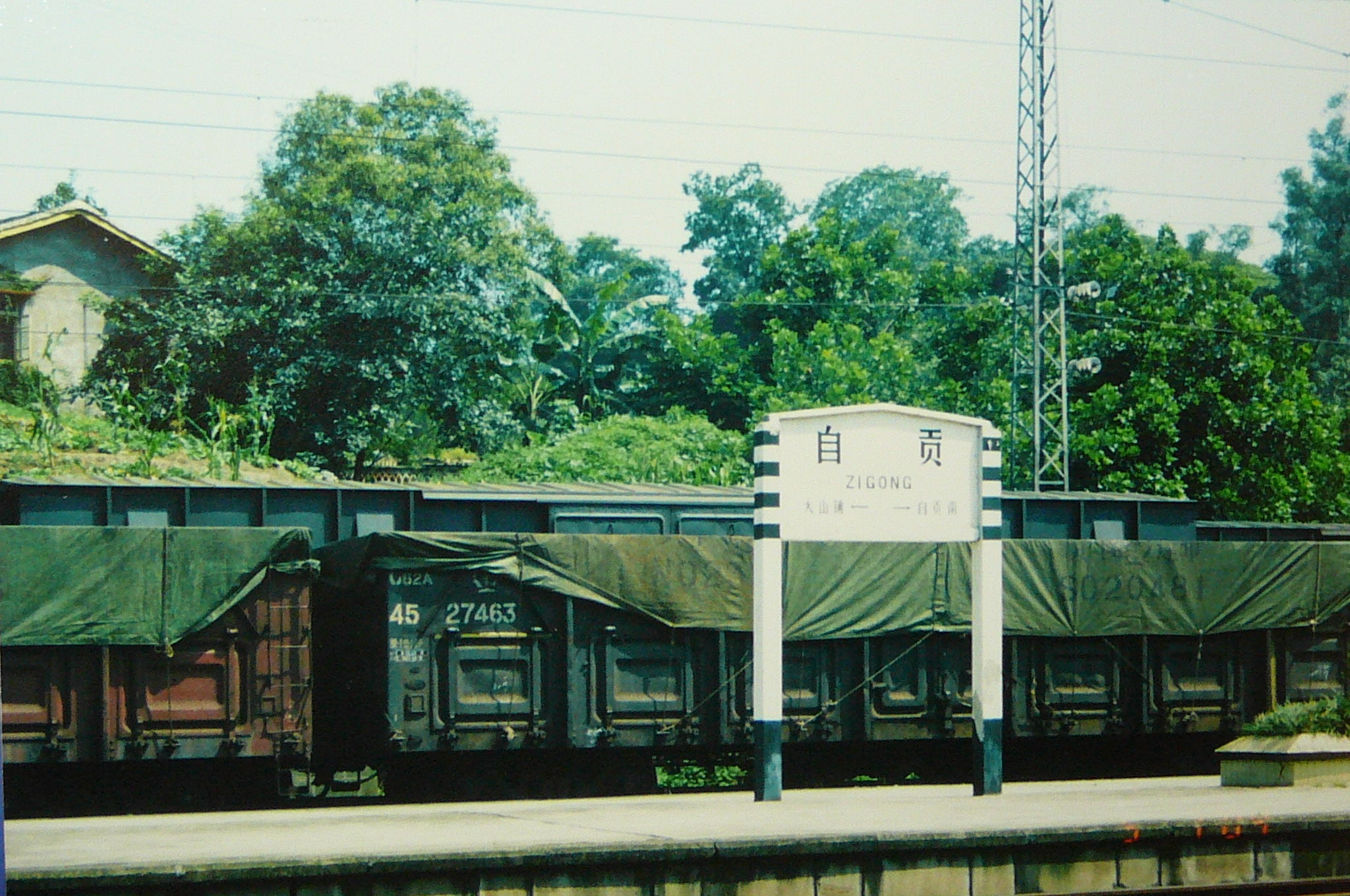

General information
- Location: Da'an District, Zigong, Sichuan; China
- Coordinates: 29.355569°N 104.791368°E
- Operated by: China Railway Chengdu Group
- Line(s): Neijiang–Kunming railway

History
- Opened: 1958
Location

Zigong North railway station (Chinese: 自贡北站) is a railway station in Da'an District, Zigong, Sichuan, China. It opened in 1958. It was formerly named Zigong but was renamed on 30 April 2021 in preparation for the opening of the new Zigong railway station.

== See also ==
- Zigong railway station
