= Sanxianci Subdistrict =

Sanxianci Subdistrict 三贤祠街道
- Subdistrict
- Interactive map of Sanxianci Subdistrict
- Country: China
- Province: Sichuan
- Prefecture-level city: Ziyang
- District: Yanjiang District

Population (2010)
  - Total: 51,739

Sanxianci Subdistrict (simplified Chinese: 三贤祠街道; traditional Chinese: 三賢祠街道; pinyin: Sānxiáncí Jiēdào) is a subdistrict in Yanjiang District, Ziyang, Sichuan, China. As of 2010, the subdistrict's population totaled 51,739.

== History ==
In November 2005, Sanxianci was upgraded from a town to a subdistrict.

== Administrative divisions ==
As of 2020, Sanxianci Subdistrict administers 12 residential communities:

- Heyanzui Community (Chinese: 河堰嘴社区)
- Sanxianci Community (Chinese: 三贤祠社区)
- Aiguo Community (Chinese: 爱国社区)
- Fengling Community (Chinese: 凤岭社区)
- Ma'an Community (Chinese: 马鞍社区)
- Xiangzhang Community (Chinese: 香樟社区)
- Xinfu Community (Chinese: 幸福社区)
- Jinghua Community (Chinese: 京华社区)
- Binhe Community (Chinese: 滨河社区)
- Sisanyi Community (Chinese: 四三一社区)
- Shizishan Community (Chinese: 狮子山社区)
- Huaguoshan Community (Chinese: 花果山社区)
