= Da'an District =

Da'an District (simplified Chinese: 大安区; traditional Chinese: 大安區) may refer to:

- Daan District, Taichung, Republic of China (Taiwan)
- Daan District, Taipei, Republic of China (Taiwan)
- Da'an District, Zigong, Sichuan, People's Republic of China
