= Wuhuang =

Wuhuang 伍隍镇
- Town
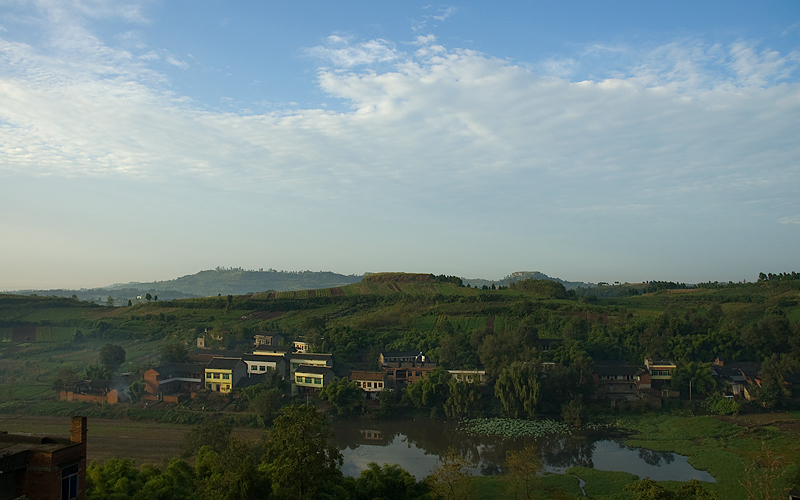

- Location within Sichuan
- Coordinates (Wuhuang town government): 29°57′54″N 104°47′18″E
- Country: People's Republic of China
- Province: Sichuan
- Prefecture-level city: Ziyang
- District: Yanjiang

Area
  - Total: 77.10 km^{2} (29.77 sq mi)

Population (2018)
  - Total: 55,180
  - Density: 715.7/km^{2} (1,854/sq mi)
- Time zone: UTC+8 (China Standard)

Wuhuang (simplified Chinese: 伍隍镇; traditional Chinese: 伍隍鎮; pinyin: Wǔhuáng Zhèn) is a town in the Yanjiang District of Ziyang, Sichuan, China. The town spans an area of 77.1 square kilometres (29.8 mi^{2}), and has a hukou population of 55,180 as of 2018. The town's administrative division code is 512002110000.

== Administrative divisions ==
Wuhuang is divided into 1 residential community (simplified Chinese: 社区; traditional Chinese: 社區; pinyin: shè qū) and 16 administrative villages (Chinese: 行政村; pinyin: xíng zhèng cūn).

=== Residential community ===
Wuhuangchang Community (伍隍场社区) serves as the town's sole residential community.

=== Villages ===
The town has the following 16 administrative villages:

- Hongmiao Village (红庙村)
- Guojia Village (郭家村)
- Yinhe Village (印合村)
- Shiqiao Village (石桥村)
- Yiwanshui Village (一碗水村)
- Wuli Village (五里村)
- Jiangxi Village (江西村)
- Chongxing Village (崇兴村)
- Puzi Village (铺子村)
- Baipo Village (白坡村)
- Maliu Village (麻柳村)
- Baohua Village (爆花村)
- Honghua Village (红花村)
- Piaoshan Village (瓢山村)
- Yuanyi Village (园艺村)
- Gaomiao Village (高庙村)

=== Former divisions ===
Former administrative divisions of Wuhuang include Wutai Village (Chinese: 五台村), Wadian Village (瓦店村), Longmen Village (龙门村), Qiangong Village (千弓村), Nantan Village (南湍村), Shuangfeng Village (双峰村), Huaxiang Village (华向村), Yanjing Village (盐井村), and Paotai Village (炮台村).

== Demographics ==
As of 2018, Wuhuang has a hukou population of 55,180. In the 2010 Chinese Census, Wuhuang had a recorded population of 40,004.

== Economy ==
Baipo Village (Chinese: 白坡村) in Wuhuang is home to 120 mu of cherry orchards, producing a specific type of cherries known as hongfei cherries (Chinese: 红妃樱桃; pinyin: hóng fēi yīng táo).
