= Bianma Township =

Bianma Township 边马乡
- Rural Township
- Biānmǎ Xiāng
- Location in Hebei Location in China
- Coordinates: 36°10′09″N 115°02′06″E
- Country: People's Republic of China
- Province: Hebei
- Prefecture-level city: Handan
- County: Wei

Area
  - Total: 47.98 km^{2} (18.53 sq mi)

Population (2010)
  - Total: 45,042
  - Density: 938.9/km^{2} (2,432/sq mi)
- Time zone: UTC+8 (China Standard)

Bianma Township (Chinese: 边马乡; pinyin: Biānmǎ Xiāng) is a rural township located in Wei County, Handan, Hebei, China. According to the 2010 census, Bianma Township had a population of 45,042, including 21,873 males and 23,169 females. The population was distributed as follows: 10,270 people aged under 14, 31,161 people aged between 15 and 64, and 3,611 people aged over 65.

== See also ==
- List of township-level divisions of Hebei
