= Lianhua Subdistrict, Yanjiang District =

Lianhua 莲花街道
- Subdistrict
- Location within Sichuan
- Coordinates (Lianhua Subdistrict office): 30°07′35″N 104°39′36″E
- Country: People's Republic of China
- Province: Sichuan
- Prefecture-level city: Ziyang
- District: Yanjiang

Population (2010)
  - Total: 78,374
- Time zone: UTC+8 (China Standard)

Lianhua Subdistrict (simplified Chinese: 莲花街道;; traditional Chinese: 蓮花街道; pinyin: Liánhuā Jiēdào) is a subdistrict within the Yanjiang District of Ziyang City in Sichuan, China. Its population was 78,374 as of 2010. The subdistrict's administrative division code is 512002001000.

== Etymology ==
The district's name (莲花) translates directly as lotus.

== History ==
Lianhua Subdistrict was created in November, 2005 was part of a wider administrative reshuffling done by the Sichuan Provincial Government.

== Administrative divisions ==
The subdistrict is divided into 11 communities:

- Yanzhong Community (雁中社区)
- Yanbei Community (雁北社区)
- Xiangyang Community (向阳社区)
- Guanyinge Community (观音阁社区)
- Train Station Community (火车站社区)
- Haichuan Community (海川社区)
- Shuanglongjing Community (双龙井社区)
- Jiuyanqiao Community (九眼桥社区)
- Chengbei Community (城北社区)
- Lianhua Community (莲花社区)
- Binjiang Road Community (滨江路社区)
