= Beitaitou Township =

Beitaitou Township 北台头乡
- Rural Township
- Běitáitóu Xiāng
- Location in Hebei Location in China
- Coordinates: 36°12′54″N 114°52′26″E
- Country: People's Republic of China
- Province: Hebei
- Prefecture-level city: Handan
- County: Wei

Area
  - Total: 26.57 km^{2} (10.26 sq mi)

Population (2010)
  - Total: 16,267
  - Density: 612.2/km^{2} (1,586/sq mi)
- Time zone: UTC+8 (China Standard)

Beitaitou Township (Chinese: 北台头乡; pinyin: Běitáitóu Xiāng) is a rural township located in Wei County, Handan, Hebei, China. According to the 2010 census, Beitaitou Township had a population of 16,267, including 7,507 males and 8,760 females. The population was distributed as follows: 4,009 people aged under 14, 10,613 people aged between 15 and 64, and 1,645 people aged over 65.

== See also ==
- List of township-level divisions of Hebei
