= Wei County, Handan =

Wei County 魏县
- County
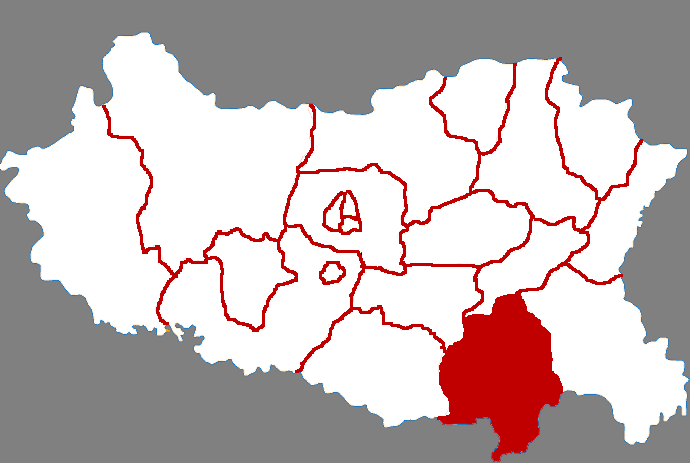
- Location of Wei County within Handan, China

- Location of the seat in Hebei
- Coordinates: 36°21′36″N 114°56′20″E
- Country: People's Republic of China
- Province: Hebei
- Prefecture-level city: Handan
- Time zone: UTC+8 (China Standard)

Wei County or Weixian (simplified Chinese: 魏县; traditional Chinese: 魏縣; pinyin: Wèi Xiàn) is a county in the south of Hebei province, China, bordering Henan province to the south. It is under the administration of the prefecture-level city of Handan.

== Administrative divisions ==
The administrative subdivisions of Wei County are as follows:

Towns:

- Weicheng (魏城镇), Dezheng (德政镇), Huilong (回隆镇), Beiyao (北皋镇), Shuangjing (双井镇), Yali (牙里镇), Chewang (车往镇)

Townships:

- Damacun Township (大马村乡), Daxinzhuang Township (大辛庄乡), Damo Township (大磨乡), Dongdaigu Township (东代固乡), Beitaitou Township (北台头乡), Renwangji Township (仁望集乡), Bianma Township (边马乡), Shakouji Township (沙口集乡), Jizhenzhai Township (棘针寨乡, Yehuguai Township (野胡拐乡), Yuanbao Township (院堡乡), Nanshuangmiao Township (南双庙乡), Bokou Township (泊口乡), Zhang'erzhuang Township (张二庄乡)

== Climate ==
Climate data for Weixian, elevation 52 m (171 ft), (1991–2020 normals, extremes 1981–present)
Month	Jan	Feb	Mar	Apr	May	Jun	Jul	Aug	Sep	Oct	Nov	Dec	Year
Record high °C (°F)	20.2 (68.4)	24.6 (76.3)	30.0 (86.0)	34.3 (93.7)	38.5 (101.3)	41.5 (106.7)	40.1 (104.2)	36.7 (98.1)	37.6 (99.7)	33.6 (92.5)	27.4 (81.3)	23.5 (74.3)	41.5 (106.7)
Mean daily maximum °C (°F)	4.2 (39.6)	8.6 (47.5)	15.1 (59.2)	21.5 (70.7)	27.0 (80.6)	32.0 (89.6)	32.0 (89.6)	30.4 (86.7)	26.9 (80.4)	21.3 (70.3)	12.8 (55.0)	5.9 (42.6)	19.8 (67.7)
Daily mean °C (°F)	−1.6 (29.1)	2.4 (36.3)	8.6 (47.5)	15.1 (59.2)	20.6 (69.1)	25.6 (78.1)	27.0 (80.6)	25.5 (77.9)	20.8 (69.4)	14.6 (58.3)	6.6 (43.9)	0.3 (32.5)	13.8 (56.8)
Mean daily minimum °C (°F)	−5.8 (21.6)	−2.2 (28.0)	3.3 (37.9)	9.3 (48.7)	14.8 (58.6)	20.0 (68.0)	23.0 (73.4)	21.8 (71.2)	16.2 (61.2)	9.5 (49.1)	2.0 (35.6)	−3.8 (25.2)	9.0 (48.2)
Record low °C (°F)	−18.0 (−0.4)	−15.1 (4.8)	−8.4 (16.9)	−1.9 (28.6)	3.0 (37.4)	8.6 (47.5)	16.5 (61.7)	12.4 (54.3)	5.4 (41.7)	−2.5 (27.5)	−16.0 (3.2)	−18.2 (−0.8)	−18.2 (−0.8)
Average precipitation mm (inches)	3.8 (0.15)	7.9 (0.31)	10.8 (0.43)	32.6 (1.28)	41.0 (1.61)	66.7 (2.63)	154.4 (6.08)	94.9 (3.74)	57.2 (2.25)	28.8 (1.13)	17.6 (0.69)	4.9 (0.19)	520.6 (20.49)
Average precipitation days (≥ 0.1 mm)	2.2	3.1	3.0	5.2	6.1	7.7	11.2	9.0	7.2	5.2	4.0	2.5	66.4
Average snowy days	2.7	2.6	0.8	0.3	0	0	0	0	0	0	0.9	2.2	9.5
Average relative humidity (%)	65	61	57	63	67	64	79	83	78	72	71	67	69
Mean monthly sunshine hours	137.4	150.9	196.3	219.3	247.1	224.6	191.4	196.0	178.7	175.8	146.7	138.1	2,202.3
Percentage possible sunshine	44	49	53	56	56	51	43	47	49	51	48	46	49
Source: China Meteorological Administration all-time January high
