= Bokou Township =

Bokou Township 泊口乡
- Rural Township
- Bókǒu Xiāng
- Location in Hebei Location in China
- Coordinates: 36°10′26″N 114°53′36″E
- Country: People's Republic of China
- Province: Hebei
- Prefecture-level city: Handan
- County: Wei

Area
  - Total: 41.74 km^{2} (16.12 sq mi)

Population (2010)
  - Total: 35,108
  - Density: 841.1/km^{2} (2,178/sq mi)
- Time zone: UTC+8 (China Standard)

Bokou Township (Chinese: 泊口乡; pinyin: Bókǒu Xiāng) is a rural township located in Wei County, Handan, Hebei, China. According to the 2010 census, Bokou Township had a population of 35,108, including 17,164 males and 17,944 females. The population was distributed as follows: 7,557 people aged under 14, 24,681 people aged between 15 and 64, and 2,870 people aged over 65.

== See also ==
- List of township-level divisions of Hebei
