= Damatou =

Subdistrict of Yiyang, Hunan, China

Coordinates: 37°6′16.56″N 118°35′49.20″E

Damatou Subdistrict (Chinese: 大码头街道; pinyin: Dàmǎtou Jiēdào) is a subdistrict and the seat of Ziyang District in Yiyang Prefecture-level City, Hunan, China. The subdistrict was reformed through the amalgamation of Dashuiping Subdistrict (Chinese: 大水坪街道) and the former Damatou Subdistrict in 2005. It has an area of 5.25 km^{2} (2.03 sq mi) with a population of 43,483 (as of the 2010 census). The subdistrict was divided into 10 communities and one village.
