= Huilong, Zigong =

Huilong 回龙镇
- Town
- Location in Sichuan
- Coordinates: 29°18′18″N 105°02′32″E
- Country: People's Republic of China
- Province: Sichuan
- Prefecture-level city: Zigong
- District: Da'an
- Village-level divisions: 1 residential community 17 villages
- Elevation: 325 m (1,066 ft)
- Time zone: UTC+8 (China Standard)
- Area code: 0813

Huilong (simplified Chinese: 回龙; traditional Chinese: 回龍; pinyin: Huílóng) is a town of Da'an District, Zigong, Sichuan, People's Republic of China, situated 26 kilometres (16 mi) east-southeast of downtown Zigong. As of 2011, it has one residential community (社区) and 17 villages under its administration.

== See also ==
- List of township-level divisions of Sichuan
