= Changchun, Hunan =

Town in Hunan, China

Changchun Town 长春镇
- Town
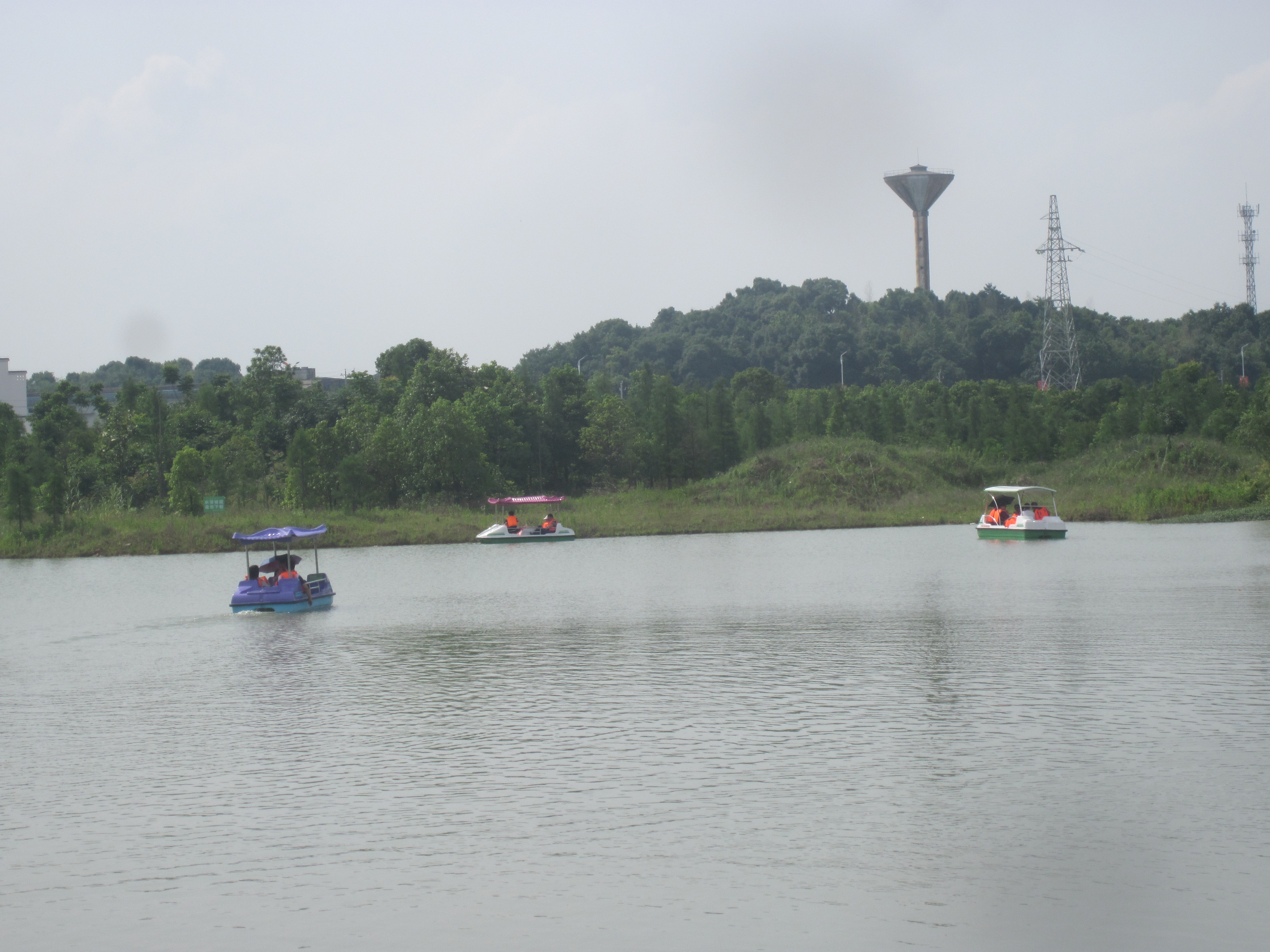
- The Yunmeng Fangzhou Water Park.

- Location in Hunan Changchun Town (China)
- Coordinates: 28°37′02″N 112°19′41″E
- Country: People's Republic of China
- Province: Hunan
- Prefecture-level city: Yiyang
- District: Ziyang District

Area
  - Total: 125.29 km^{2} (48.37 sq mi)

Population (2016)
  - Total: 88,780
  - Density: 708.6/km^{2} (1,835/sq mi)
- Time zone: UTC+8 (China Standard)
- Postal code: 431000
- Area code: 0737

Changchun Town (simplified Chinese: 长春镇; traditional Chinese: 長春鎮; pinyin: Chángchūn Zhèn) is a suburban town in Ziyang District of Yiyang, Hunan, China. The town is bordered to the southwest by Yingfengqiao Town, to the east by Zhangjiazhai Township, and to the north by Bailuqiao Town and Yanzhi Subdistrict.

== Geography ==
Zi River, known as "Mother River", flows directly through the town.

Huangjia Lake (黄家湖), situated in the north of the town, is very popular for boating, fishing and camping and is home to many residents from other areas of the province during the summer months.

== Economy ==
Pig, Vegetable, Flower, Aquatic Products and tourism are main industries in the town.

== Transportation ==
=== Expressway ===
The G5513 Changsha-Zhangjiajie Expressway, which connects Zhangjiajie and Changsha, runs northwest to southeast through the town.

The Yiyang-Yuanjiang Expressway, runs north through Yanzhi Subdistrict and Qionghu Subdistrict to Yuanjiang City, and runs south to Ziyang District of Yiyang City.

== Attractions ==
The Yunmeng Fangzhou Water Park (云梦方舟水上乐园) is a famous scenic spot in the town.

== Gallery ==
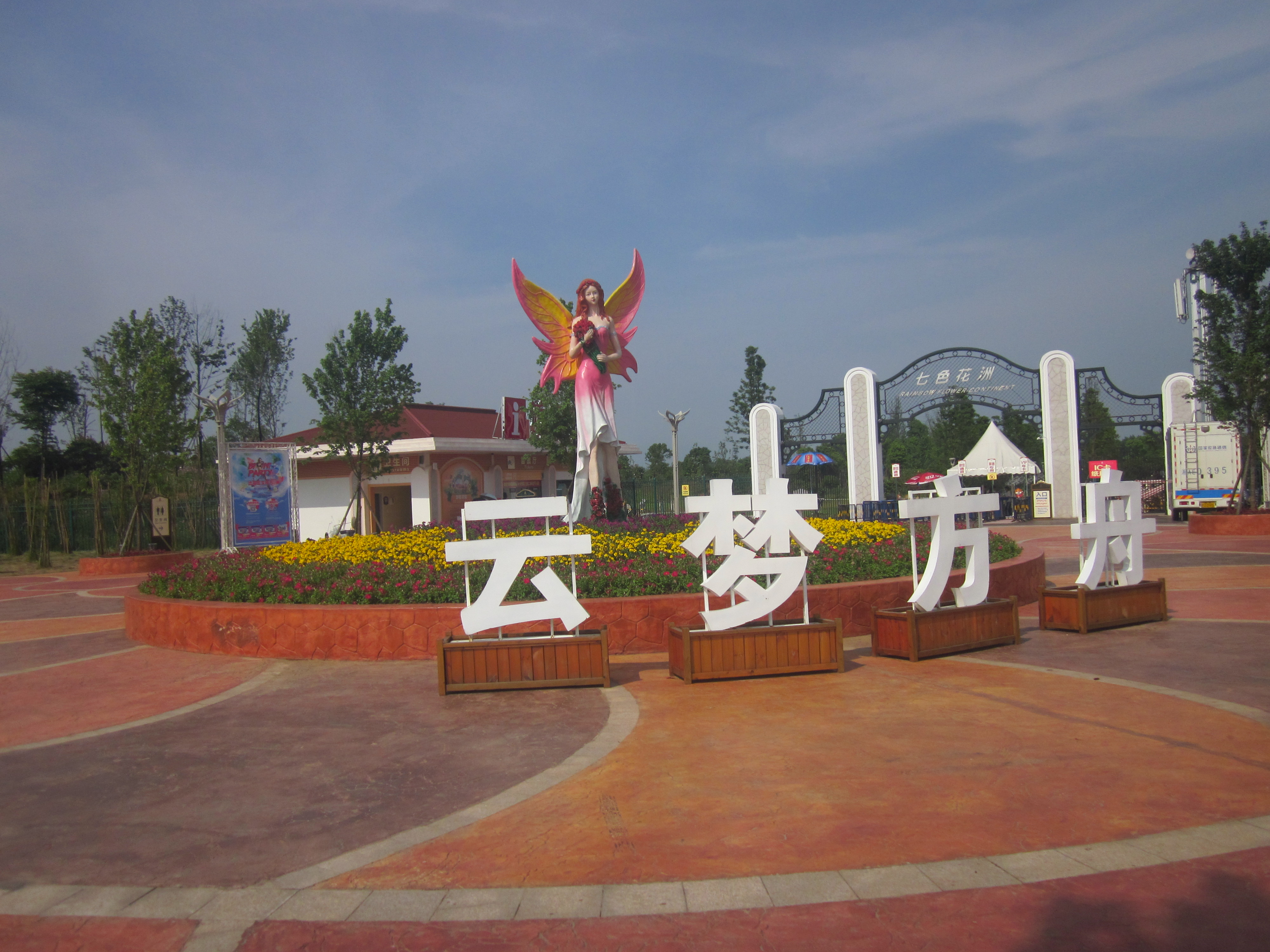
Entrance of Yunmeng Fangzhou Water Park.

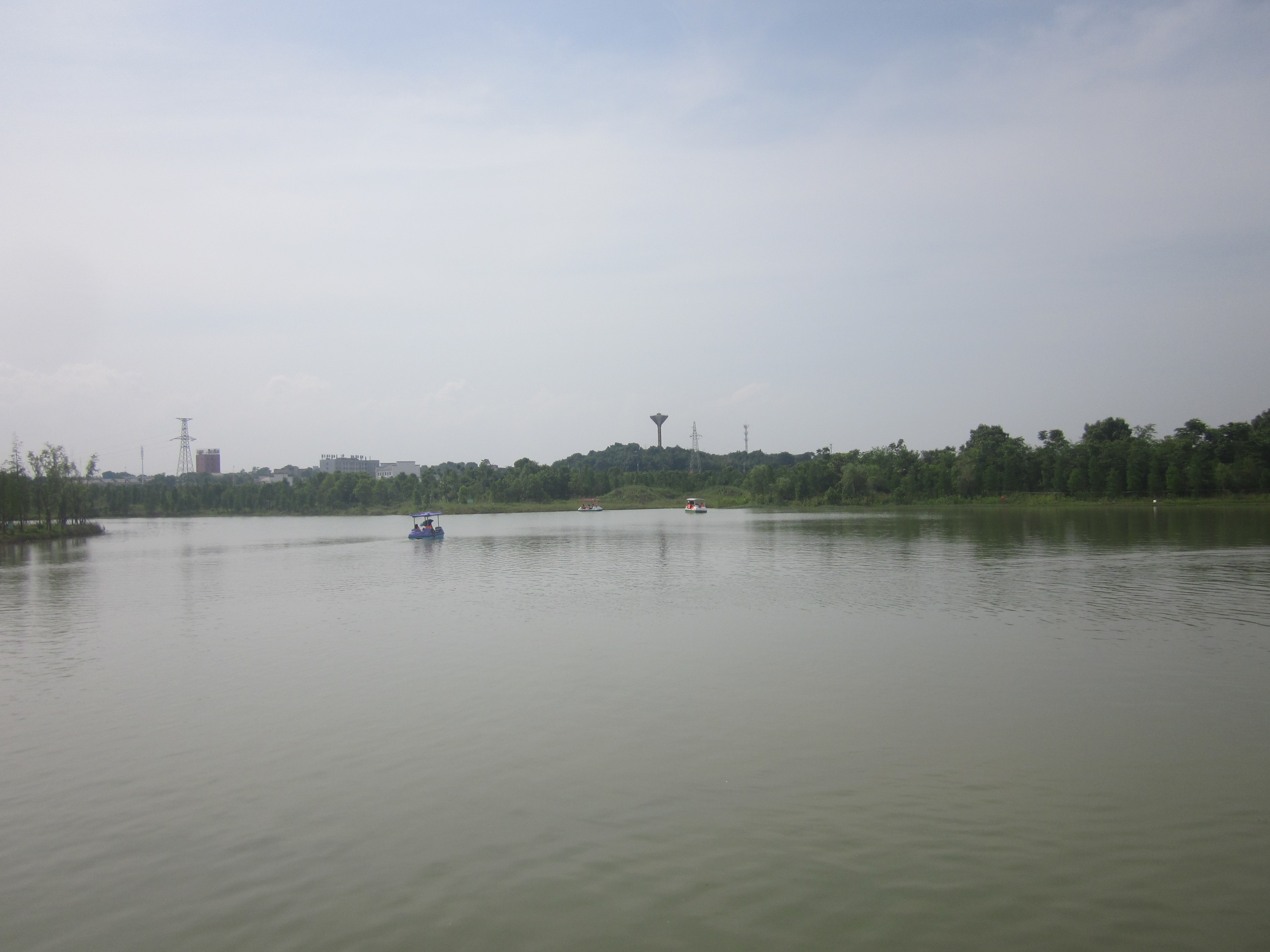
The lake within the Yunmeng Fangzhou Water Park.

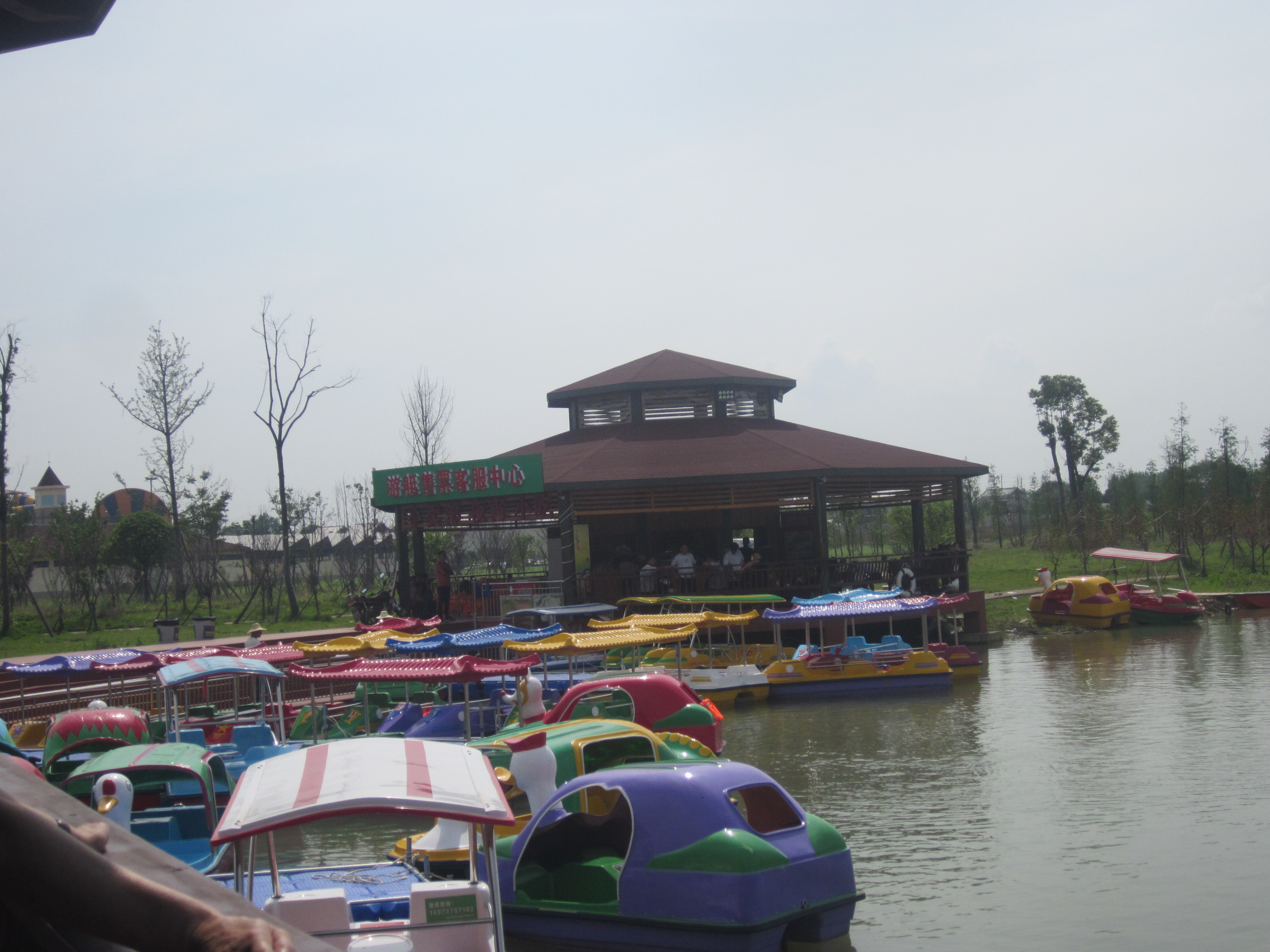
Boats are moored.

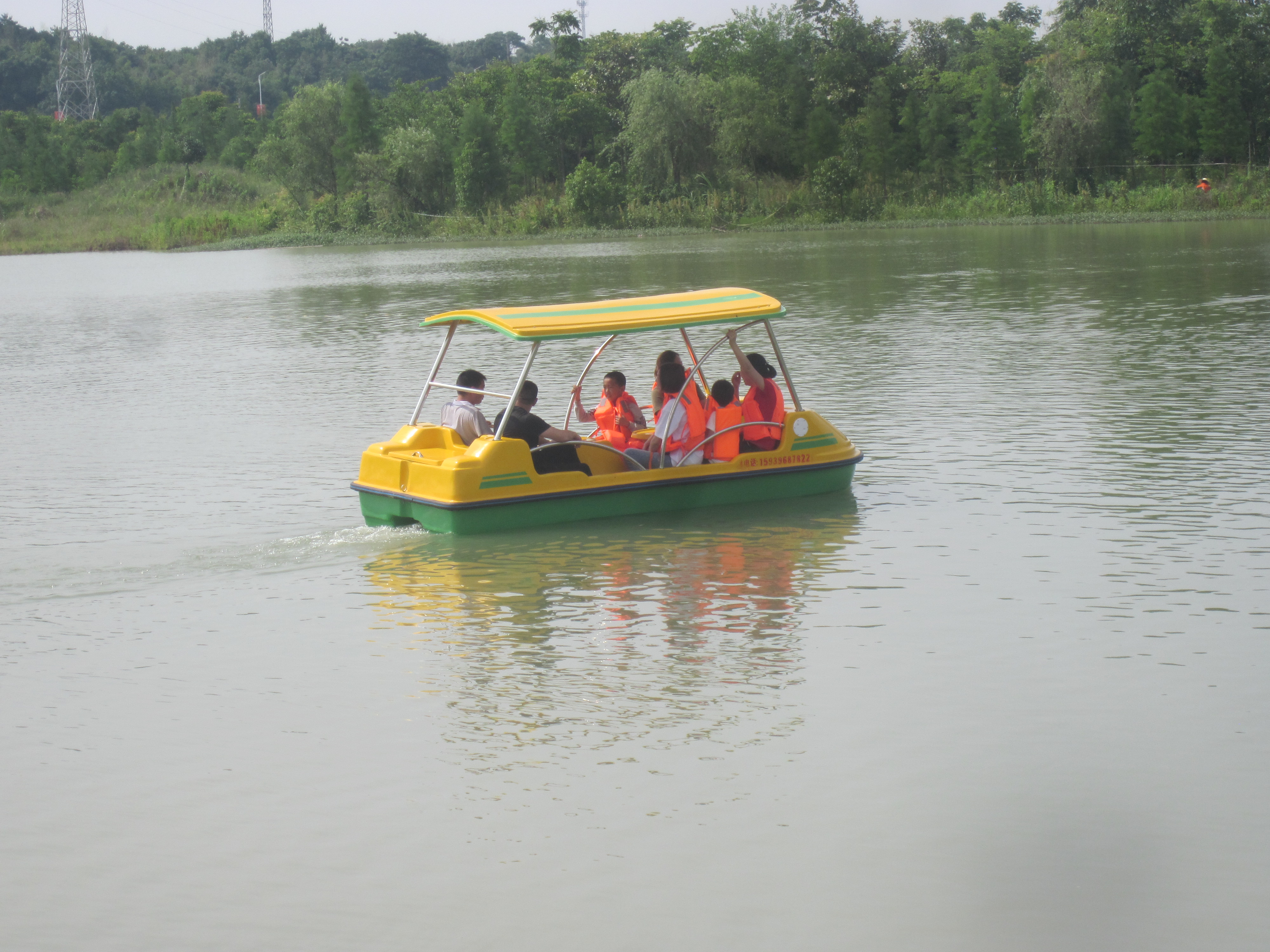
People are boating in the Yunmeng Fangzhou Water Park.

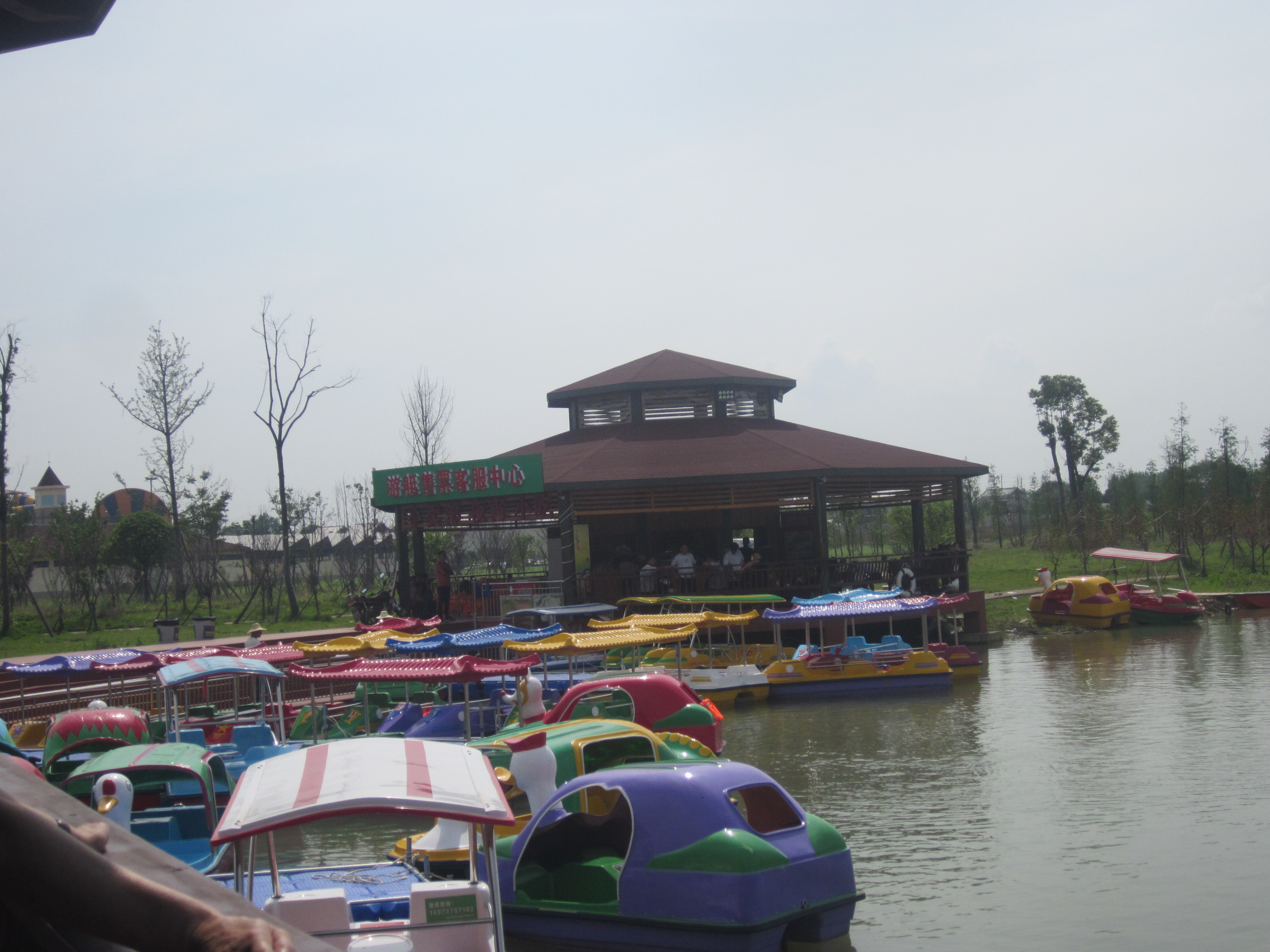
The Yunmeng Fangzhou Water Park

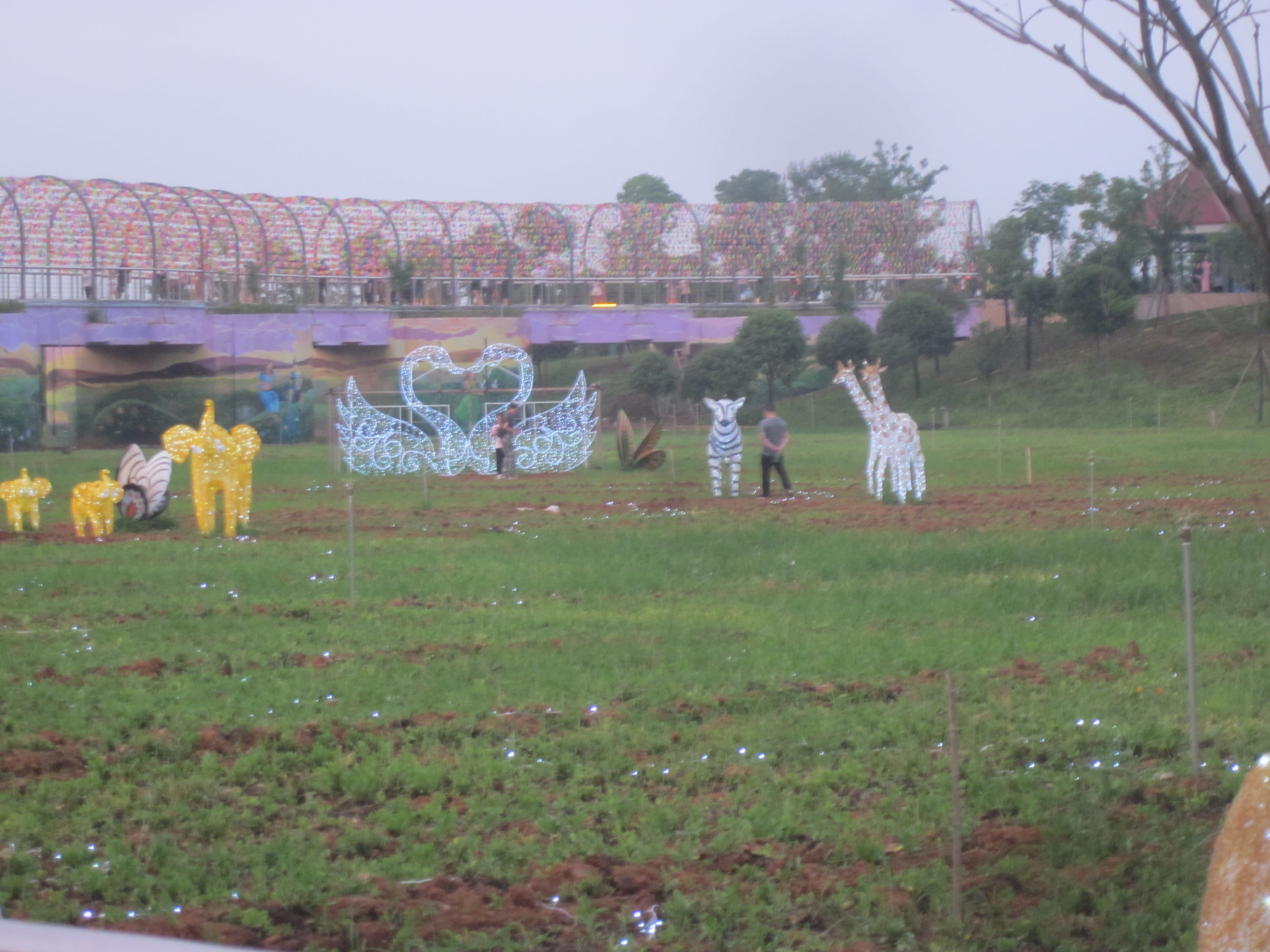
A lantern light in the Yunmeng Fangzhou Water Park.
