= Huìlóng, Zhongjiang County =

Huilong 会龙镇
- Town
- Location in Sichuan
- Coordinates: 30°41′35″N 104°58′22″E
- Country: People's Republic of China
- Province: Sichuan
- Prefecture-level city: Deyang
- County: Zhongjiang
- Village-level divisions: 1 residential community 17 villages
- Elevation: 394 m (1,293 ft)
- Time zone: UTC+8 (China Standard)
- Area code: 0838

Huilong (simplified Chinese: 会龙; traditional Chinese: 會龍; pinyin: Huìlóng) is a town of Zhongjiang County in east-central Sichuan province, China, situated 47 kilometres (29 mi) southeast of the county seat as the crow flies. As of 2011, it has one residential community (社区) and 17 villages under its administration.

== See also ==
- List of township-level divisions of Sichuan
