= Huílóng, Zhongjiang County =

Huilong 回龙镇
- Town
- Location in Sichuan
- Coordinates: 31°01′17″N 104°46′00″E
- Country: People's Republic of China
- Province: Sichuan
- Prefecture-level city: Deyang
- County: Zhongjiang
- Village-level divisions: 2 residential communities 29 villages

Area
  - Total: 68.18 km^{2} (26.32 sq mi)
- Elevation: 434 m (1,424 ft)

Population
  - Total: 54,569
  - Density: 800.4/km^{2} (2,073/sq mi)
- Time zone: UTC+8 (China Standard)
- Postal code: 618114
- Area code: 0838

Huilong (simplified Chinese: 回龙; traditional Chinese: 回龍; pinyin: Huílóng) is a town of Zhongjiang County in northeastern Sichuan province, China, situated 8.5 kilometres (5.3 mi) east-southeast of the county seat and 36 km (22 mi) southeast of Deyang as the crow flies. As of 2011, it has two residential communities (社区) and 29 villages under its administration.

== See also ==
- List of township-level divisions of Sichuan
