= Dezheng =

Dezheng 德政镇
- Town
- Dézhèng Zhèn
- Location in Hebei Location in China
- Coordinates: 36°18′44″N 114°57′36″E
- Country: People's Republic of China
- Province: Hebei
- Prefecture-level city: Handan
- County: Wei

Area
  - Total: 27.17 km^{2} (10.49 sq mi)

Population (2010)
  - Total: 24,034
  - Density: 884.7/km^{2} (2,291/sq mi)
- Time zone: UTC+8 (China Standard)

Dezheng (Chinese: 德政镇; pinyin: Dézhèng Zhèn) is a town located in Wei County, Handan, Hebei, China. According to the 2010 census, Dezheng had a population of 24,034, including 12,265 males and 11,769 females. The population was distributed as follows: 4,793 people aged under 14, 17,340 people aged between 15 and 64, and 1,901 people aged over 65.

== See also ==
- List of township-level divisions of Hebei
