= Daxinzhuang Township =

Daxinzhuang Township 大辛庄乡
- Rural Township
- Dàxīnzhuāng Xiāng
- Location in Hebei Location in China
- Coordinates: 36°13′46″N 115°03′00″E
- Country: People's Republic of China
- Province: Hebei
- Prefecture-level city: Handan
- County: Wei

Area
  - Total: 47.03 km^{2} (18.16 sq mi)

Population (2010)
  - Total: 31,056
  - Density: 660.4/km^{2} (1,710/sq mi)
- Time zone: UTC+8 (China Standard)

Daxinzhuang Township (Chinese: 大辛庄乡; pinyin: Dàxīnzhuāng Xiāng) is a rural township located in Wei County, Handan, Hebei, China. According to the 2010 census, Daxinzhuang Township had a population of 31,056, including 15,232 males and 15,824 females. The population was distributed as follows: 6,603 people aged under 14, 22,229 people aged between 15 and 64, and 2,224 people aged over 65.

== See also ==
- List of township-level divisions of Hebei
