= Huilong station =

Huilong station can refer to:

- Huilong station (Chengdu Metro), a metro station in Chengdu, China
- Huilong metro station, a metro station in Taoyuan, Taiwan
