= Ziyang, Yiyang =

Ziyang 资阳区
- District
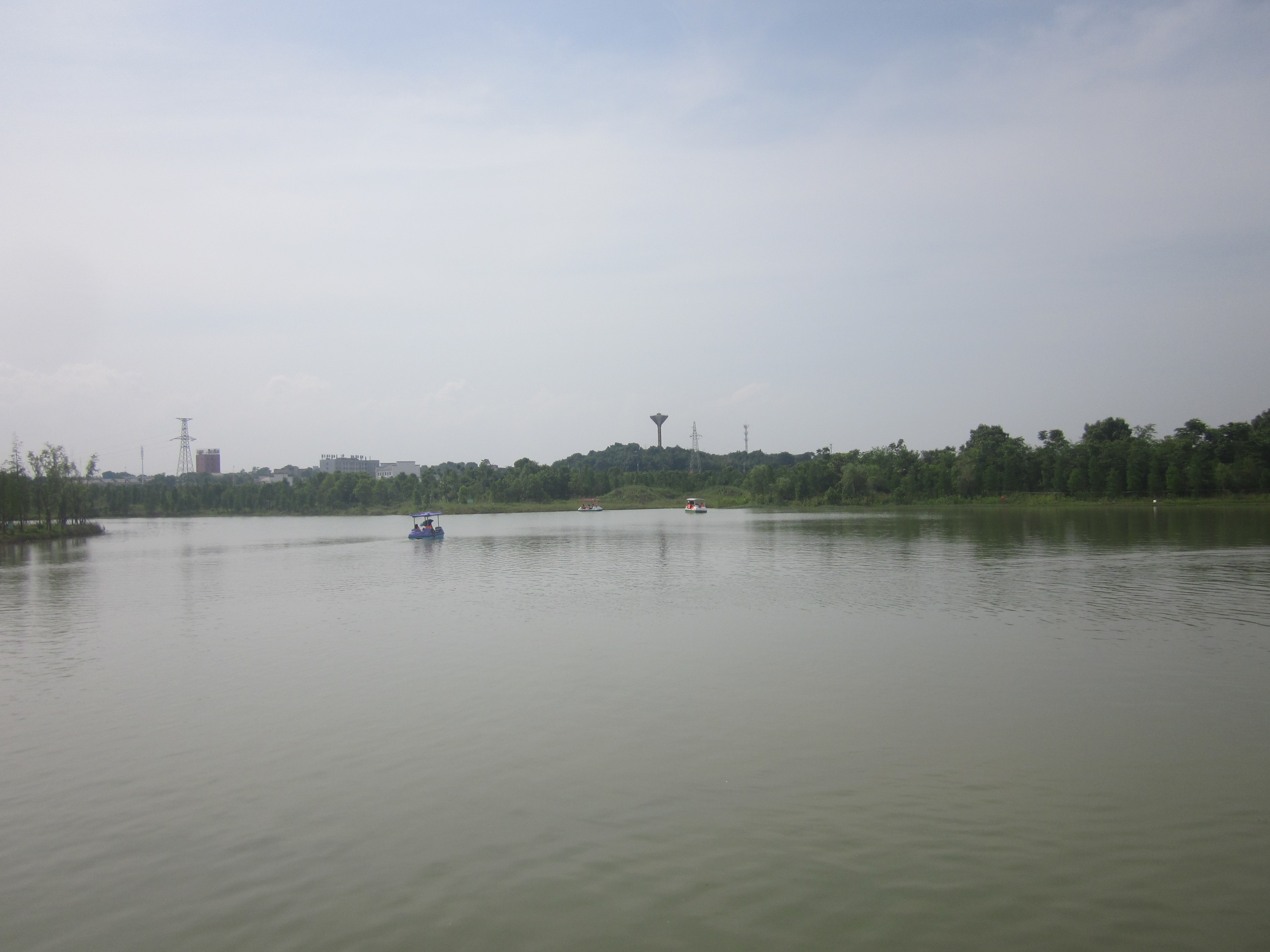

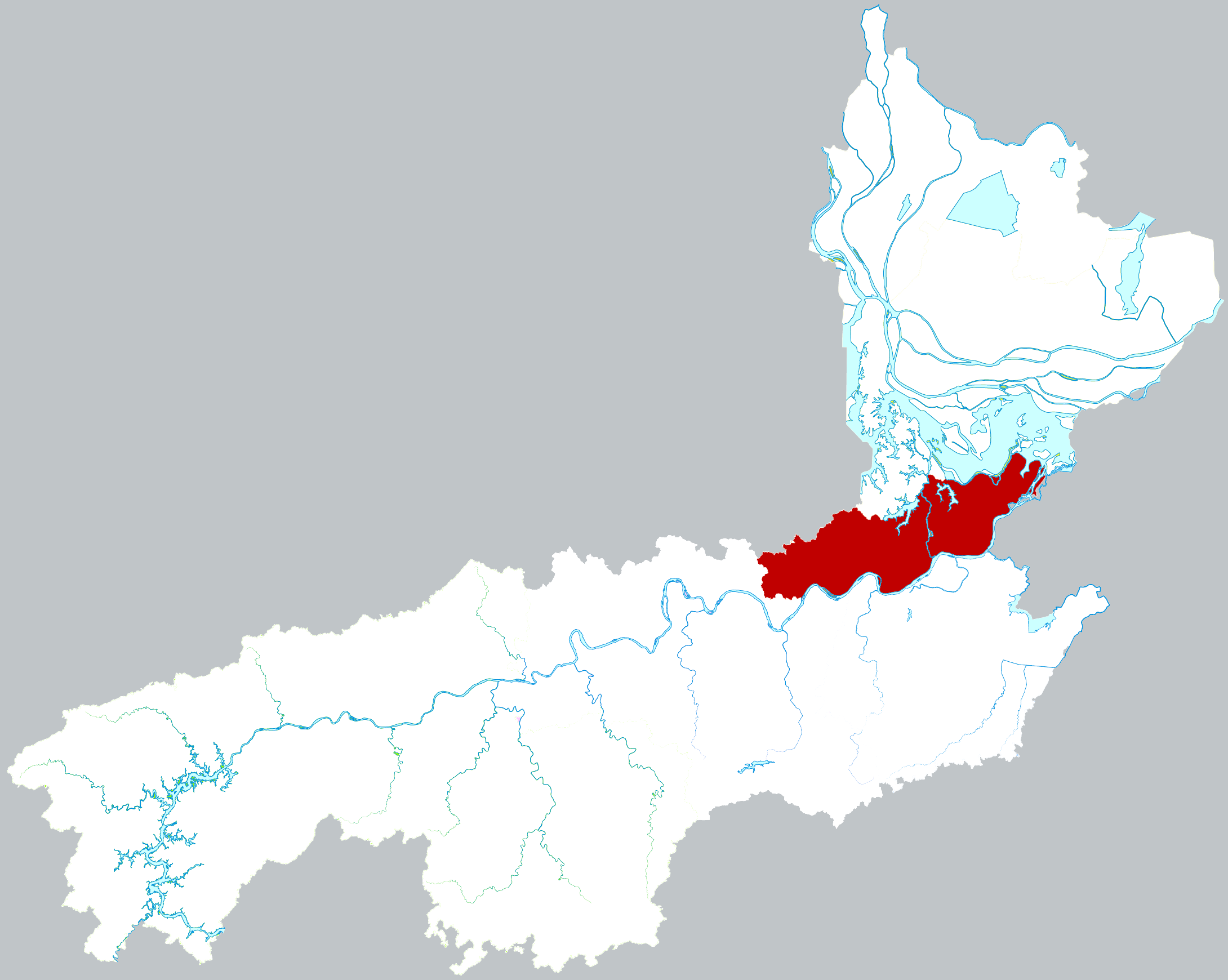
- Location of Ziyang District within Yiyang

- Location in Hunan
- Coordinates: 28°42′00″N 112°21′26″E
- Country: People's Republic of China
- Province: Hunan
- Prefecture-level city: Yiyang

Area
  - Total: 1,280 km^{2} (490 sq mi)

Population
  - Total: 356,400
  - Density: 278/km^{2} (721/sq mi)
- Time zone: UTC+8 (China Standard)

Ziyang District (simplified Chinese: 资阳区; traditional Chinese: 資陽區; pinyin: Zīyáng Qū) is one of two districts in Yiyang City, Hunan Province, China. The district is located on the northern bank of Zi River and on the southern bank of the Dongting Lake. It is bordered to the north by Yuanjiang City and Hanshou County, to the west by Taojiang County, to the south by Heshan District, and to the east by Xiangyin County.

Ziyang District covers an area of 571.8 km^{2} (220.8 sq mi), and as of 2015, it had a permanent resident population of 421,000. The district has two subdistricts, five towns and a township under its jurisdiction. The government seat is Damatou Subdistrict (大码头街道).

== Administrative divisions ==
After an adjustment of subdistrict divisions of Ziyang District in December 2005, Ziyang District has two subdistricts, five towns and a township under its jurisdiction.

2 Subdistricts

- Damatou (大码头街道)
- Qichelu (汽车路街道)

5 Towns

- Changchun (长春镇)
- Cihukou (茈湖口镇)
- Shaotou (沙头镇)
- Xinqiaohe (新桥河镇)
- Yingfengqiao (迎风桥镇)

1 Township

- Zhangjiasai (张家塞乡)
