= Huilong Township, Hunan =

Huilong Township 回龙乡
- Township
- Interactive map of Huilong Township
- Coordinates: 28°53′13″N 110°11′02″E
- Country: People's Republic of China
- Province: Hunan
- Autonomous prefecture: Xiangxi
- County: Yongshun
- Village-level divisions: 5 villages
- Elevation: 293 m (961 ft)
- Time zone: UTC+8 (China Standard)
- Area code: 0730

Huilong Township (simplified Chinese: 回龙乡; traditional Chinese: 回龍鄉; pinyin: Huílóng Xiāng) is a township of Yongshun County in northwestern Hunan province, China, located 35 kilometres (22 mi) southeast of the county seat and 38 km (24 mi) southwest of Zhangjiajie, as the crow flies. As of 2011, it has five villages under its administration.

== See also ==
- List of township-level divisions of Hunan
