= Huilong, Nanchong =

Huilong 会龙镇
- Town
- Location in Sichuan
- Coordinates: 30°52′22″N 106°21′13″E
- Country: People's Republic of China
- Province: Sichuan
- Prefecture-level city: Nanchong
- District: Gaoping
- Village-level divisions: 1 residential community 10 villages
- Elevation: 391 m (1,283 ft)
- Time zone: UTC+8 (China Standard)
- Area code: 0817

Huilong (simplified Chinese: 会龙; traditional Chinese: 會龍; pinyin: Huìlóng) is a town of Gaoping District, Nanchong, Sichuan, People's Republic of China, situated 24 kilometres (15 mi) east-northeast of downtown Nanchong. As of 2011, it has one residential community (社区) and ten villages under its administration.

== See also ==
- List of township-level divisions of Sichuan
