= Huilong, Hebei =

Huilong 回隆镇
- Town
- Location in Hebei
- Coordinates: 36°08′55″N 114°46′47″E
- Country: People's Republic of China
- Province: Hebei
- Prefecture-level city: Handan
- County: Wei
- Village-level divisions: 29 villages

Area
  - Total: 44 km^{2} (17 sq mi)
- Elevation: 58 m (190 ft)
- Time zone: UTC+8 (China Standard)
- Postal code: 056804
- Area code: 0310

Huilong (Chinese: 回隆; pinyin: Huílóng) is a town of Wei County of Handan City in extreme southern Hebei province, China, bordering Henan to the south and situated 26 kilometres (16 mi) southwest of the county seat and 35 kilometres (22 mi) east of Anyang, Henan. As of 2011, it has 29 villages under its administration.

== See also ==
- List of township-level divisions of Hebei
