= Anyue County =

Anyue County 安岳县
- County
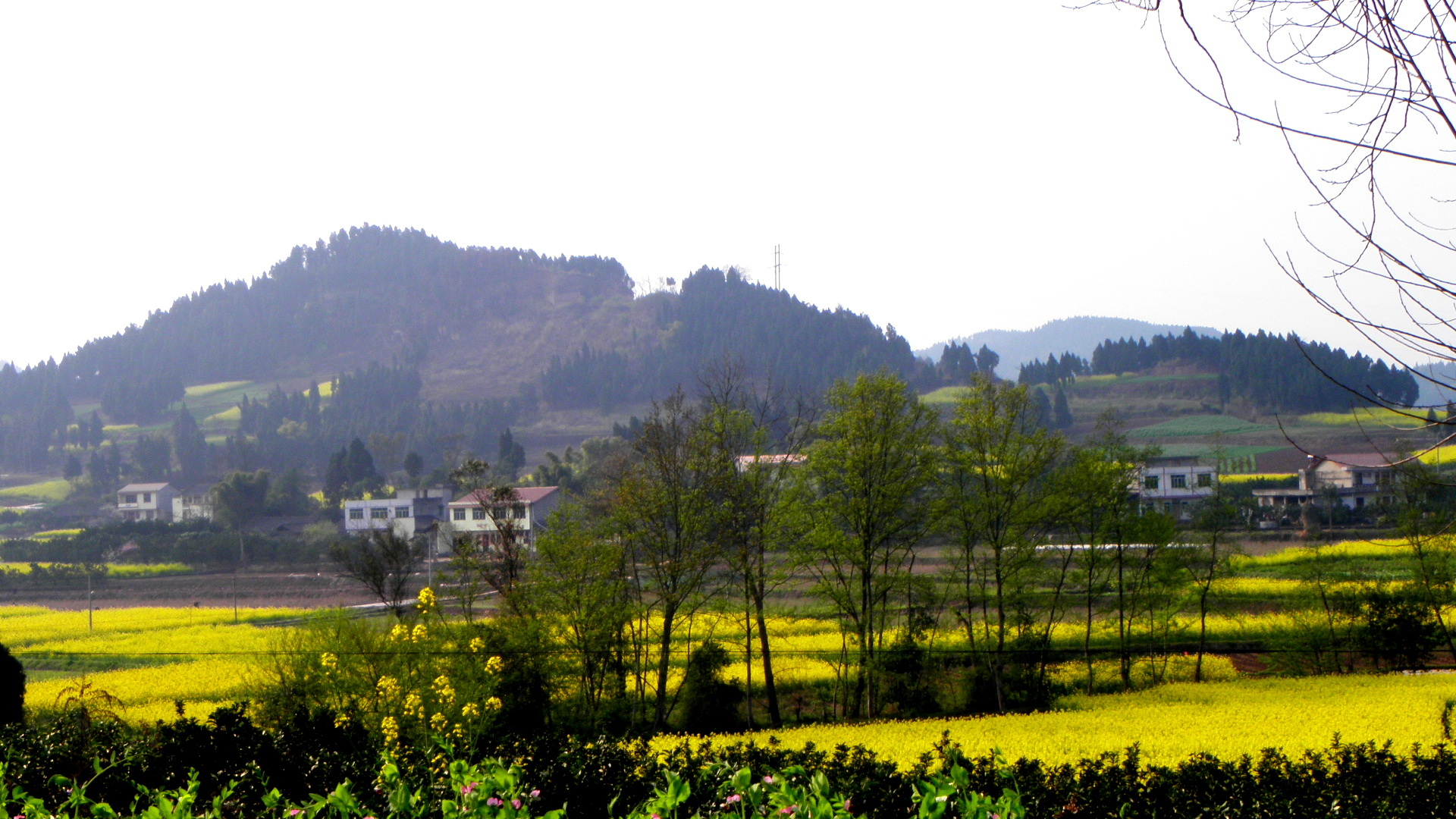
- A rural area in Anyue County

- Location in Sichuan
- Coordinates: 30°06′04″N 105°20′06″E
- Country: China
- Province: Sichuan
- Prefecture-level city: Ziyang

Area
  - Total: 2,690 km^{2} (1,040 sq mi)
- Elevation: 314 m (1,030 ft)

Population (2020 census)
  - Total: 950,939
  - Density: 354/km^{2} (916/sq mi)
- Time zone: UTC+8 (China Standard)
- Website: anyue.gov.cn

Anyue (Chinese: 安岳; pinyin: Ānyuè) is a county under the administration of the prefecture-level city of Ziyang in eastern Sichuan province, China, located in between the Fu and Tuo Rivers. Its area is about 2,690 square kilometres (1,040 sq mi) with a population of 950,939 in 2020. Anyue is famous for its high quality lemons and traditional Buddhist stone carvings.

The Grove of the Reclining Buddha (Wofo Yuan 臥佛院) contains the largest single collection of Buddhist texts carved in stone as well as artwork from the Tang dynasty. Texts are located in a series of caves

== Administrative divisions ==
Anyue County comprises 2 subdistricts, 32 towns and 12 townships:

subdistricts

- Yuecheng 岳城街道
- Shiqiao 石桥街道

towns

- Yueyang 岳阳镇
- Yuanda 鸳大镇
- Tongxian 通贤镇
- Longtai 龙台镇
- Yaoshi 姚市镇
- Linfeng 林凤镇
- Maojia 毛家镇
- Yongqing 永清镇
- Yongshun 永顺镇
- Shiyang 石羊镇
- Liangbanqiao 两板桥镇
- Hulong 护龙镇
- Lijia 李家镇
- Yuanba 元坝镇
- Xinglong 兴隆镇
- Tianlin 天林镇
- Zhenzi 镇子镇
- Wenhua 文化镇
- Zhouli 周礼镇
- Xunlong 驯龙镇
- Huayan 华严镇
- Wofo 卧佛镇
- Changheyuan 长河源镇
- Zhongyi 忠义镇
- Hujian 护建镇
- Nanxun 南薰镇
- Sixian 思贤镇
- Qingliu 清流镇
- Xiehe 协和镇
- Chaoyang 朝阳镇
- Qianlong 乾龙镇
- Daping 大平镇

townships

- Laifeng 来凤乡
- Tianma 天马乡
- Yunfeng 云峰乡
- Yuexin 岳新乡
- Dongsheng 东胜乡
- Gaosheng 高升乡
- Hengmiao 横庙乡
- Baitasi 白塔寺乡
- Shuanglongjie 双龙街乡
- Heyi 合义乡
- Qianfo 千佛乡
- Gongqiao 拱桥乡

== Climate ==
Climate data for Anyue, elevation 384 m (1,260 ft), (1991–2020 normals, extremes 1981–present)
| Month | Jan | Feb | Mar | Apr | May | Jun | Jul | Aug | Sep | Oct | Nov | Dec | Year |
|---|---|---|---|---|---|---|---|---|---|---|---|---|---|
| Record high °C (°F) | 19.0 (66.2) | 23.5 (74.3) | 32.6 (90.7) | 34.5 (94.1) | 37.0 (98.6) | 37.4 (99.3) | 41.8 (107.2) | 42.3 (108.1) | 40.7 (105.3) | 32.2 (90.0) | 25.4 (77.7) | 18.7 (65.7) | 42.3 (108.1) |
| Mean daily maximum °C (°F) | 9.4 (48.9) | 12.6 (54.7) | 17.6 (63.7) | 23.3 (73.9) | 27.1 (80.8) | 29.1 (84.4) | 32.0 (89.6) | 31.8 (89.2) | 27.2 (81.0) | 21.4 (70.5) | 16.6 (61.9) | 10.8 (51.4) | 21.6 (70.8) |
| Daily mean °C (°F) | 6.6 (43.9) | 9.3 (48.7) | 13.4 (56.1) | 18.4 (65.1) | 22.2 (72.0) | 24.6 (76.3) | 27.3 (81.1) | 26.9 (80.4) | 22.9 (73.2) | 18.0 (64.4) | 13.3 (55.9) | 8.2 (46.8) | 17.6 (63.7) |
| Mean daily minimum °C (°F) | 4.5 (40.1) | 6.8 (44.2) | 10.2 (50.4) | 14.8 (58.6) | 18.5 (65.3) | 21.4 (70.5) | 23.8 (74.8) | 23.3 (73.9) | 20.0 (68.0) | 15.7 (60.3) | 11.1 (52.0) | 6.3 (43.3) | 14.7 (58.5) |
| Record low °C (°F) | −2.5 (27.5) | −0.8 (30.6) | −0.3 (31.5) | 5.7 (42.3) | 7.9 (46.2) | 14.5 (58.1) | 17.7 (63.9) | 17.0 (62.6) | 14.4 (57.9) | 4.2 (39.6) | 1.3 (34.3) | −3.0 (26.6) | −3.0 (26.6) |
| Average precipitation mm (inches) | 14.8 (0.58) | 18.2 (0.72) | 33.3 (1.31) | 63.8 (2.51) | 108.1 (4.26) | 154.3 (6.07) | 199.7 (7.86) | 158.9 (6.26) | 111.5 (4.39) | 63.4 (2.50) | 28.8 (1.13) | 15.6 (0.61) | 970.4 (38.2) |
| Average precipitation days (≥ 0.1 mm) | 8.6 | 7.8 | 9.7 | 12.4 | 13.6 | 14.6 | 13.0 | 11.7 | 14.2 | 15.8 | 9.1 | 8.1 | 138.6 |
| Average snowy days | 0.7 | 0.4 | 0 | 0 | 0 | 0 | 0 | 0 | 0 | 0 | 0 | 0.3 | 1.4 |
| Average relative humidity (%) | 83 | 79 | 74 | 73 | 72 | 79 | 79 | 76 | 81 | 85 | 84 | 84 | 79 |
| Mean monthly sunshine hours | 35.1 | 48.3 | 97.3 | 128.9 | 133.2 | 116.3 | 160.3 | 169.9 | 99.8 | 61.3 | 55.6 | 33.6 | 1,139.6 |
| Percentage possible sunshine | 11 | 15 | 26 | 33 | 31 | 28 | 38 | 42 | 27 | 18 | 18 | 11 | 25 |
Source: China Meteorological Administrationall-time extreme temperatureall-time July high
