= Huilong Township, Mao County =

Huilong Township 回龙乡
- Township
- Location in Sichuan
- Coordinates: 31°49′56″N 103°39′49″E
- Country: People's Republic of China
- Province: Sichuan
- Autonomous prefecture: Ngawa
- County: Mao
- Village-level divisions: 4 villages
- Elevation: 1,683 m (5,522 ft)
- Time zone: UTC+8 (China Standard)
- Area code: 0837

Huilong Township (simplified Chinese: 回龙乡; traditional Chinese: 回龍鄉; pinyin: Huílóng Xiāng) is a township of Mao County in the southeast of the Ngawa Tibetan and Qiang Autonomous Prefecture in northern Sichuan province, China, located 25 kilometres (16 mi) northwest of the county seat as the crow flies and just west of the northern intersection of China National Highway 213 with Sichuan Provincial Highway 302. As of 2011, it has four villages under its administration.

== See also ==
- List of township-level divisions of Sichuan
