= Huilong, Suining =

Huilong 会龙镇
- Town
- Location in Sichuan
- Coordinates: 30°25′17″N 105°27′26″E
- Country: People's Republic of China
- Province: Sichuan
- Prefecture-level city: Suining
- District: Anju
- Village-level divisions: 1 residential community 17 villages
- Elevation: 304 m (997 ft)
- Time zone: UTC+8 (China Standard)
- Area code: 0825

Huilong (simplified Chinese: 会龙; traditional Chinese: 會龍; pinyin: Huìlóng) is a town of Anju District, Suining, Sichuan, People's Republic of China, situated 14 kilometres (8.7 mi) southwest of downtown Suining. As of 2011, it has one residential community (社区) and 17 villages under its administration.

== See also ==
- List of township-level divisions of Sichuan
