= Huilong Yi Ethnic Township =

Huilong Yi Ethnic Township 回隆彝族乡
- Ethnic township
- Location in Sichuan
- Coordinates: 29°11′09″N 102°23′26″E
- Country: People's Republic of China
- Province: Sichuan
- Prefecture-level city: Ya'an
- County: Shimian
- Village-level divisions: 6 villages
- Elevation: 1,010 m (3,310 ft)
- Time zone: UTC+8 (China Standard)
- Area code: 0835

Huilong Yi Ethnic Township (simplified Chinese: 回隆彝族乡; traditional Chinese: 回隆彝族鄉; pinyin: Huílóng Yízú Xiāng) is a township of Shimian County in western Sichuan province, China, located 5.6 kilometres (3.5 mi) southeast of the county seat as the crow flies along China National Highway 108. As of 2011, it has six villages under its administration.

== See also ==
- List of township-level divisions of Sichuan
