= Huilong, Kaijiang County =

Huilong 回龙镇
- Town
- Location in Sichuan
- Coordinates: 31°10′32″N 107°46′12″E
- Country: People's Republic of China
- Province: Sichuan
- Prefecture-level city: Dazhou
- County: Kaijiang
- Village-level divisions: 1 residential community 6 villages
- Elevation: 448 m (1,470 ft)
- Time zone: UTC+8 (China Standard)
- Area code: 0818

Huilong (simplified Chinese: 回龙; traditional Chinese: 回龍; pinyin: Huílóng) is a town of Kaijiang County in northeastern Sichuan province, China, situated 13 kilometres (8.1 mi) northwest of the county seat. As of 2011, it has one residential community (社区) and six villages under its administration.

== See also ==
- List of township-level divisions of Sichuan
