= Huilong, Yingshan County, Sichuan =

Huilong 回龙镇
- Town
- Location in Sichuan
- Coordinates: 31°09′14″N 106°30′04″E
- Country: People's Republic of China
- Province: Sichuan
- Prefecture-level city: Nanchong
- County: Yingshan
- Village-level divisions: 1 residential community 19 villages
- Elevation: 358 m (1,175 ft)
- Time zone: UTC+8 (China Standard)
- Area code: 0817

Huilong (simplified Chinese: 回龙; traditional Chinese: 回龍; pinyin: Huílóng) is a town of Yingshan County in northeastern Sichuan province, China, situated 10 kilometres (6.2 mi) northwest of the county seat. As of 2011, it has one residential community (社区) and 19 villages under its administration.

== See also ==
- List of township-level divisions of Sichuan
