= Huilong Township, Mianning County =

Huilong Township 回龙乡
- Township
- Location in Sichuan
- Coordinates: 28°27′40″N 102°04′05″E
- Country: People's Republic of China
- Province: Sichuan
- Autonomous prefecture: Liangshan
- County: Mianning
- Village-level divisions: 6 villages
- Elevation: 1,937 m (6,355 ft)
- Time zone: UTC+8 (China Standard)
- Area code: 0834

Huilong Township (simplified Chinese: 回龙乡; traditional Chinese: 回龍鄉; pinyin: Huílóng Xiāng) is a township of Mianning County in the north of Liangshan Yi Autonomous Prefecture in southwestern Sichuan province, China, located 14 kilometres (8.7 mi) southwest of the county seat as the crow flies. As of 2011, it has six villages under its administration.

== See also ==
- List of township-level divisions of Sichuan
