= Yanjiang, Ziyang =

Yanjiang 雁江区
- District
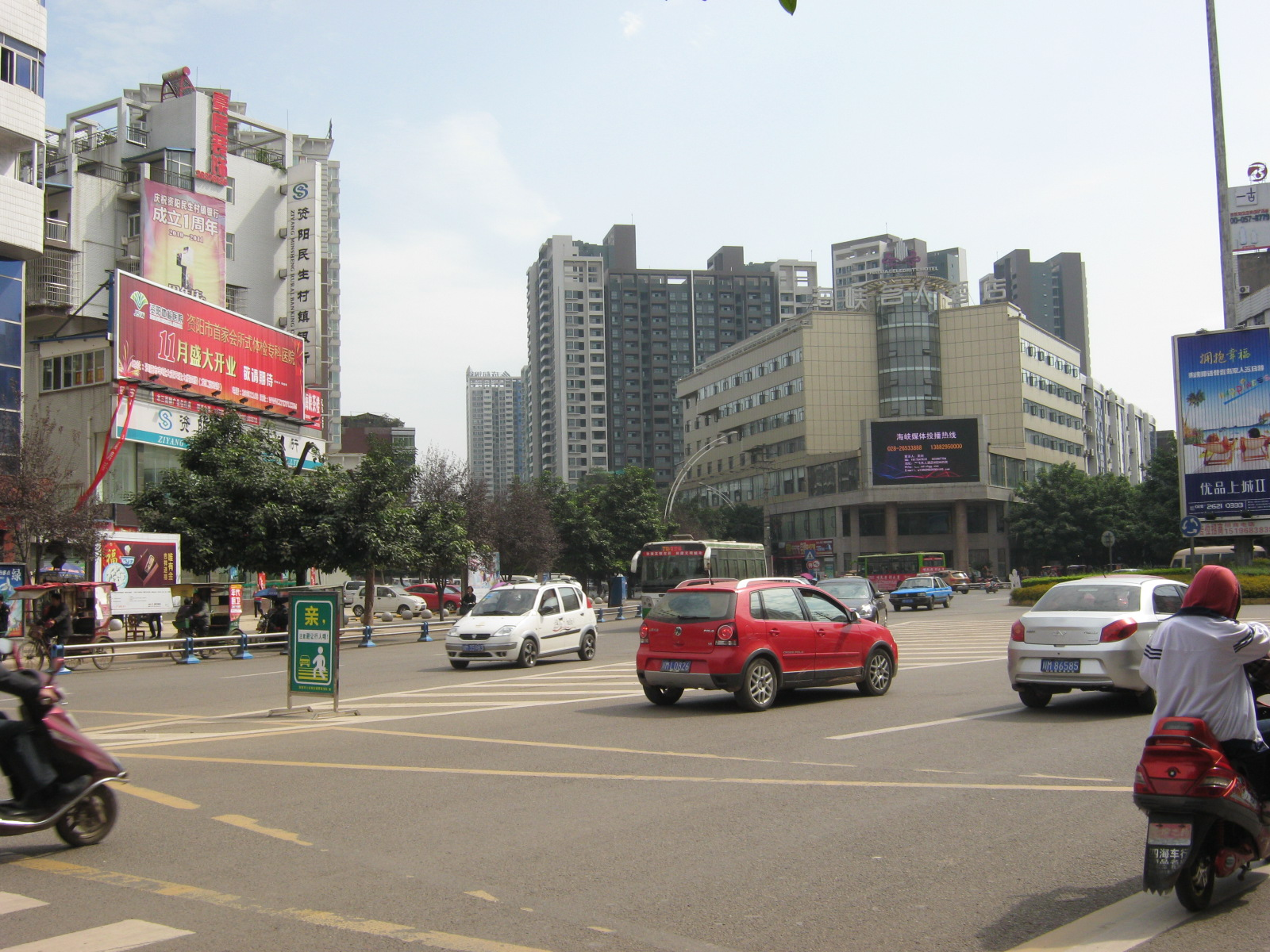

- Location in Sichuan
- Coordinates (Yanjiang District government): 30°06′28″N 104°40′37″E
- Country: China
- Province: Sichuan
- Prefecture-level city: Ziyang
- District seat: Baolian Subdistrict

Area
  - Total: 1,633 km^{2} (631 sq mi)

Population (2020 census)
  - Total: 867,119
  - Density: 531.0/km^{2} (1,375/sq mi)
- Time zone: UTC+8 (China Standard)
- Website: www.yanjiang.gov.cn

Yanjiang (Chinese: 雁江; pinyin: Yànjiāng) is the only district of the city of Ziyang, Sichuan Province, China. The district is located directly southeast of Chengdu. The district was established on June 14, 2000, by the State Council of China.

== History ==
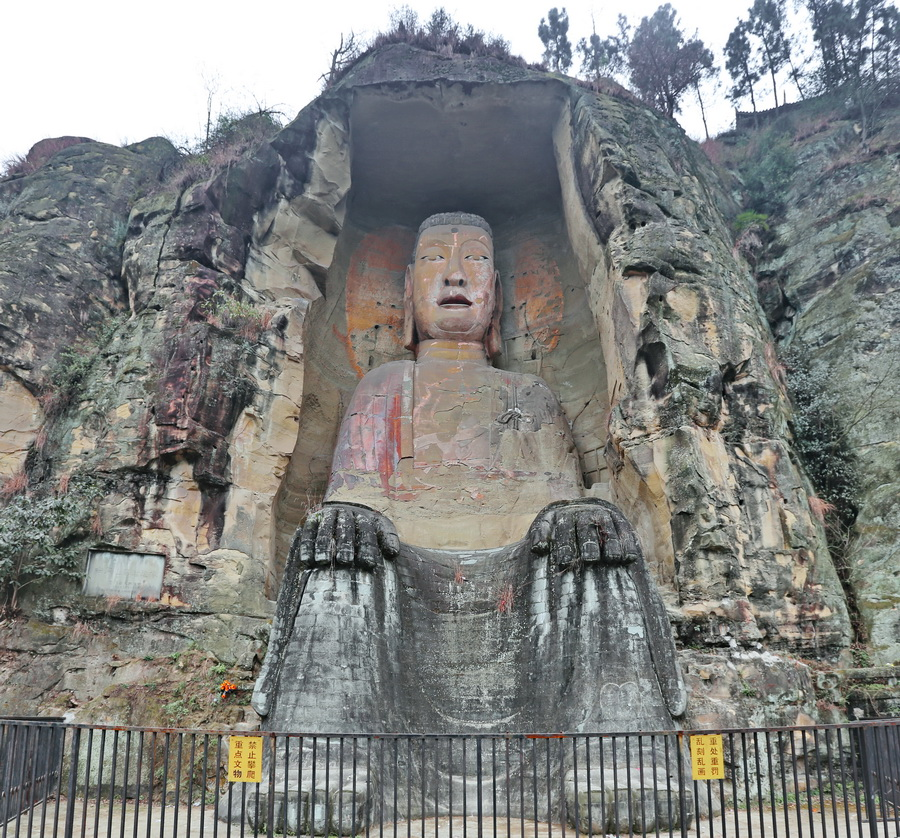
Baiyue Mountain cliff sculpture

Prior to the annexation by the Qin State, the area in the present-day Yanjiang District belonged to the Kingdom of Shu, and was part of the wider, but now extinct, Ba–Shu culture.

== Government ==
=== Administrative divisions ===
The Yanjiang District is divided into 5 subdistricts and 17 towns. The district also hosts a labor camp, which is also included in population figures.

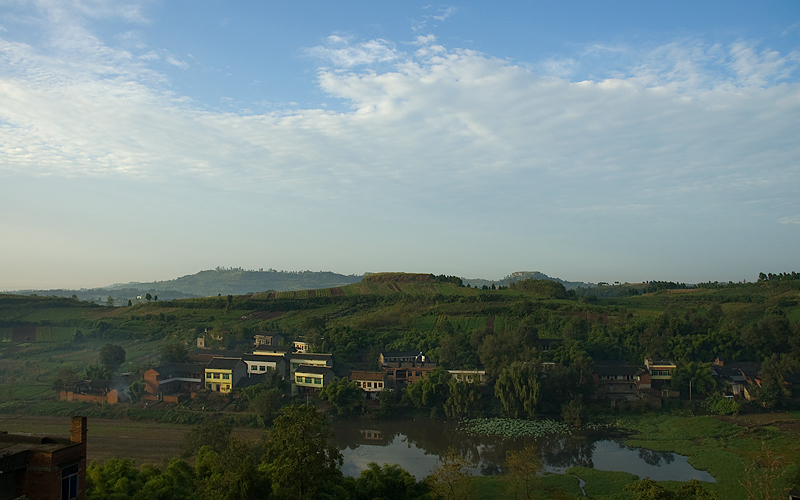
A view of a portion of Wuhuang Town, 2009

Subdistricts

- Lianhua Subdistrict (莲花街道)
- Sanxianci Subdistrict (三贤祠街道)
- Zixi Subdistrict (资溪街道)
- Shizishan Subdistrict (狮子山街道)
- Baolian Subdistrict (宝莲街道)

Towns

- Yanjiang (雁江镇)
- Songtao (松涛镇)
- Baotai (宝台镇)
- Linjiang (临江镇)
- Baohe (保和镇)
- Laojun (老君镇)
- Zhonghe (中和镇)
- Danshan (丹山镇)
- Xiaoyuan (小院镇)
- Kanjia (堪嘉镇)
- Wuhuang (伍隍镇)
- Shiling (石岭镇)
- Dongfeng (东峰镇)
- Nanjin (南津镇)
- Fengyu (丰裕镇)
- Yingjie (迎接镇)
- Xiangfu (祥符镇)

Yanjiang District also is home to the Sichuan Dayan Labor Camp (四川大堰劳动教养管理所), which had a recorded population of 2,184 in 2010.

== Economy ==
The district recorded a GDP of 50.25 billion Chinese Yuan in 2018, an 8.1% increase from the previous year. The following table shows a breakdown of the district's GDP:

Sector	2018 Value (Yuan)	Percent of 2018 GDP	Percent Increase from 2017
Primary Sector	5.136 billion	10.22%	3.5%
Secondary Sector	27.963 billion	55.65%	9.0%
Tertiary Sector	17.149 billion	34.13%	8.1%
TOTAL	50.248 billion	100.00%	8.1%

=== Agriculture ===
As of 2018, the values of the district's agriculture, forestry, animal husbandry and fishing industries totaled 9.29 billion Yuan, a 3.6% increase from 2017. Of this, the district's seeding industry's output totaled 4.62 billion Yuan, the forestry industry's totaled 0.49 billion, animal husbandry totaled 3.32 billion, fisheries totaled 0.31 billion, and fishing-related services totaled 0.55 billion. The district government estimates that in 2018 alone, the district produced 85,000 tons of meat, farmed 72,000 hectares of land, and had a nursery area of 40 hectares.

=== Telecommunications ===
At the end of 2018, the district reported 358,300 landline phones, 866,800 4G-capable mobile phones, and 450,500 broadband users.

=== Tourism ===
In 2018, Yanjiang received 7.069 million domestic tourists, contributing 4.198 billion Yuan to the district's economy. The district also received 43,300 foreign tourists in 2018, mostly from Hong Kong, Macau, and Taiwan, contributing 945,600 US Dollars to the district's economy.

== Demographics ==
According to the 2010 Chinese Census, Yanjiang District had a population of 905,729 people, down from 1,016,034 recorded in the 2000 Census. The district government's website estimated that the population stood around 1,070,000 in 2019.

=== Settlements ===
Largest cities or towns in Yanjiang 2010 Chinese Census
Rank		Pop.
1	Zixi Subdistrict	83,356
2	Lianhua Subdistrict	78,374
3	Sanxianci Subdistrict	51,739
4	Baohe Town	40,978
5	Wuhuang Town	40,004
6	Danshan Town	39,793
7	Shizishan Subdistrict	39,696
8	Laojun Town	34,961
9	Linjiang Town	34,938
10	Baotai Town	34,005

== Education ==
At the end of 2018, the district reported hosting 424 schools, of which, 276 were kindergartens, 81 were primary schools, 63 were secondary schools, and 3 were vocational secondary schools.

== Transportation ==
=== Road transport ===
As of 2018, Yanjiang District has a road network totaling 3,970.5 kilometers in length, of which, 82.3 kilometers were expressways. In 2018, the district government recorded 54.52 million passenger trips on the district's roads, an 8.0% increase from 2017. The district was home to road freight totaling a weight of 61.28 million tons, which was also an 8.0% from 2017. Notable highways which pass through the district include the G76 Expressway, the S40 Suihong Expressway, the S106 Road, and China National Highway 321.

=== Maritime Transport ===
The district reported 2.39 million tons of freight transported via waterways in 2018, a 14.9% increase from 2017. The main waterway in the district is the Tuo River.
