= Da'an, Zigong =

Da'an 大安区
- District
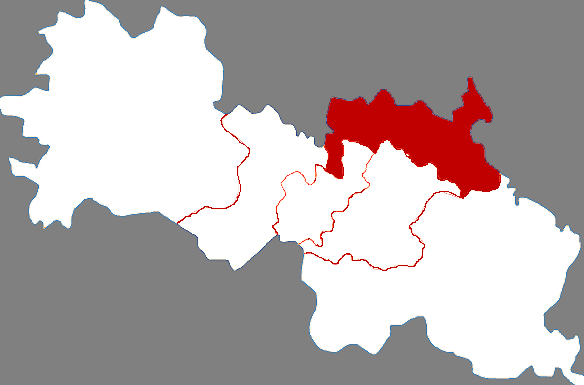
- Location of Da'an in Zigong

- Location in Sichuan
- Coordinates: 29°22′31″N 104°45′58″E
- Country: China
- Province: Sichuan
- Prefecture-level city: Zigong
- Township-level divisions: 6 subdistricts 9 towns
- District seat: Da'an Subdistrict

Area
  - Total: 398.81 km^{2} (153.98 sq mi)
- Elevation: 351 m (1,152 ft)

Population (2020 census)
  - Total: 291,645
  - Density: 731.29/km^{2} (1,894.0/sq mi)
- Time zone: UTC+8 (China Standard)
- Postal code: 643010
- Area code: 0813
- Website: http://www.zgda.gov.cn/

Da'an (Chinese: 大安; pinyin: Dà'ān) is a district of the city of Zigong, Sichuan province, China.

The district covers 400 km^{2} (150 sq mi) with a population of 291,645 in 2020.

== Administrative divisions ==
Da'an administers 6 subdistricts and 9 towns:

subdistricts

- Da'an 大安街道
- Longjing 龙井街道
- Machongkou 马冲口街道
- Lianggaoshan 凉高山街道
- Heping 和平街道
- Fenghuang 凤凰街道

towns

- Dashanpu 大山铺镇
- Tuanjie 团结镇
- Sanduozhai 三多寨镇
- Heshi 何市镇
- Xindian 新店镇
- Xinmin 新民镇
- Niufo 牛佛镇
- Miaoba 庙坝镇
- Huilong 回龙镇
