= Zhongjiang County =

Coordinates: 31°02′02″N 104°40′44″E

Zhongjiang County 中江县
- County
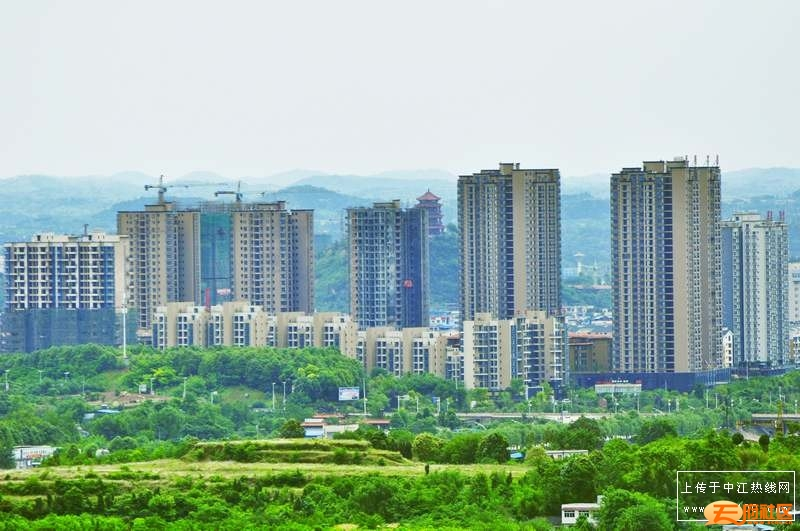

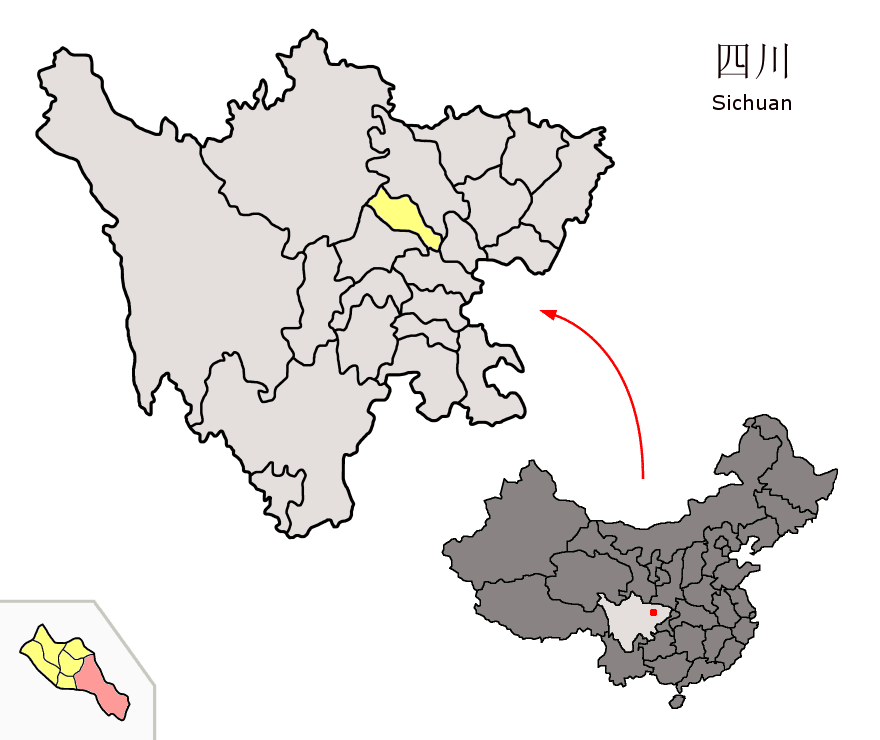
- Location of Zhongjiang County (pink) within Deyang (yellow) and Sichuan
- Country: China
- Province: Sichuan
- Prefecture-level city: Deyang
- County seat: Kaijiang Town

Area
  - County: 2,063 km^{2} (797 sq mi)

Population (2020)
  - County: 946,019
  - Density: 458.6/km^{2} (1,188/sq mi)
  - Urban: 392,548
- Time zone: UTC+8 (China Standard)

Zhongjiang County (simplified Chinese: 中江县; traditional Chinese: 中江縣; pinyin: Zhōngjiāng Xiàn) is a county of Sichuan Province, China. It is under the administration of the prefecture-level city of Deyang.

== Administrative divisions ==
Zhongjiang County comprises 26 towns and 4 townships:

towns

- Kaijiang 凯江镇
- Nanhua 南华镇
- Huilong 回龙镇
- Tongji 通济镇
- Yongtai 永太镇
- Huanglu 黄鹿镇
- Jifeng 集凤镇
- Fuxing 富兴镇
- Jiqing 辑庆镇
- Xinglong 兴隆镇
- Longtai 龙台镇
- Yong'an 永安镇
- Yuxing 玉兴镇
- Yongxing 永兴镇
- Yuelai 悦来镇
- Jiguang 继光镇
- Cangshan 仓山镇
- Guangfu 广福镇
- Huilong 会龙镇
- Wanfu 万福镇
- Puxing 普兴镇
- Lianhe 联合镇
- Fengdian 冯店镇
- Jijin 积金镇
- Tai'an 太安镇
- Dongbei 东北镇

townships

- Baishu 柏树乡
- Baiguo 白果乡
- Yongfeng 永丰乡
- Tongshan 通山乡

== Climate ==
Climate data for Zhongjiang (1991–2020 normals, extremes 1981–present)
Month	Jan	Feb	Mar	Apr	May	Jun	Jul	Aug	Sep	Oct	Nov	Dec	Year
Record high °C (°F)	20.8 (69.4)	23.3 (73.9)	31.8 (89.2)	34.0 (93.2)	36.8 (98.2)	36.9 (98.4)	41.3 (106.3)	43.0 (109.4)	37.9 (100.2)	30.9 (87.6)	26.4 (79.5)	19.2 (66.6)	43.0 (109.4)
Mean daily maximum °C (°F)	9.8 (49.6)	12.9 (55.2)	17.8 (64.0)	23.8 (74.8)	27.7 (81.9)	29.8 (85.6)	31.4 (88.5)	31.4 (88.5)	26.5 (79.7)	21.5 (70.7)	16.6 (61.9)	11.0 (51.8)	21.7 (71.0)
Daily mean °C (°F)	5.8 (42.4)	8.5 (47.3)	12.9 (55.2)	18.2 (64.8)	22.2 (72.0)	24.9 (76.8)	26.7 (80.1)	26.3 (79.3)	22.3 (72.1)	17.6 (63.7)	12.6 (54.7)	7.2 (45.0)	17.1 (62.8)
Mean daily minimum °C (°F)	2.9 (37.2)	5.3 (41.5)	9.1 (48.4)	13.8 (56.8)	17.9 (64.2)	21.2 (70.2)	23.1 (73.6)	22.7 (72.9)	19.5 (67.1)	15.1 (59.2)	9.8 (49.6)	4.4 (39.9)	13.7 (56.7)
Record low °C (°F)	−4.4 (24.1)	−2.9 (26.8)	−2.3 (27.9)	4.6 (40.3)	6.2 (43.2)	13.6 (56.5)	17.0 (62.6)	15.9 (60.6)	11.7 (53.1)	3.7 (38.7)	0.2 (32.4)	−4.4 (24.1)	−4.4 (24.1)
Average precipitation mm (inches)	9.6 (0.38)	10.9 (0.43)	21.4 (0.84)	41.2 (1.62)	72.4 (2.85)	115.6 (4.55)	169.3 (6.67)	174.6 (6.87)	121.0 (4.76)	41.2 (1.62)	13.6 (0.54)	7.3 (0.29)	798.1 (31.42)
Average precipitation days (≥ 0.1 mm)	6.7	6.3	8.4	10.7	12.2	14.1	14.2	12.2	13.8	13.0	5.8	5.3	122.7
Average snowy days	1.2	0.4	0.1	0	0	0	0	0	0	0	0	0.3	2
Average relative humidity (%)	80	77	73	71	68	75	80	79	81	82	80	81	77
Mean monthly sunshine hours	50.9	60.2	96.7	128.2	138.2	123.5	142.1	156.0	87.9	65.9	57.5	48.2	1,155.3
Percentage possible sunshine	16	19	26	33	32	29	33	38	24	19	18	15	25
Source: China Meteorological Administrationall-time extreme temperatureall-time July high
