= Ziyang =

Ziyang 资阳市 Tsiyang
- Prefecture-level city
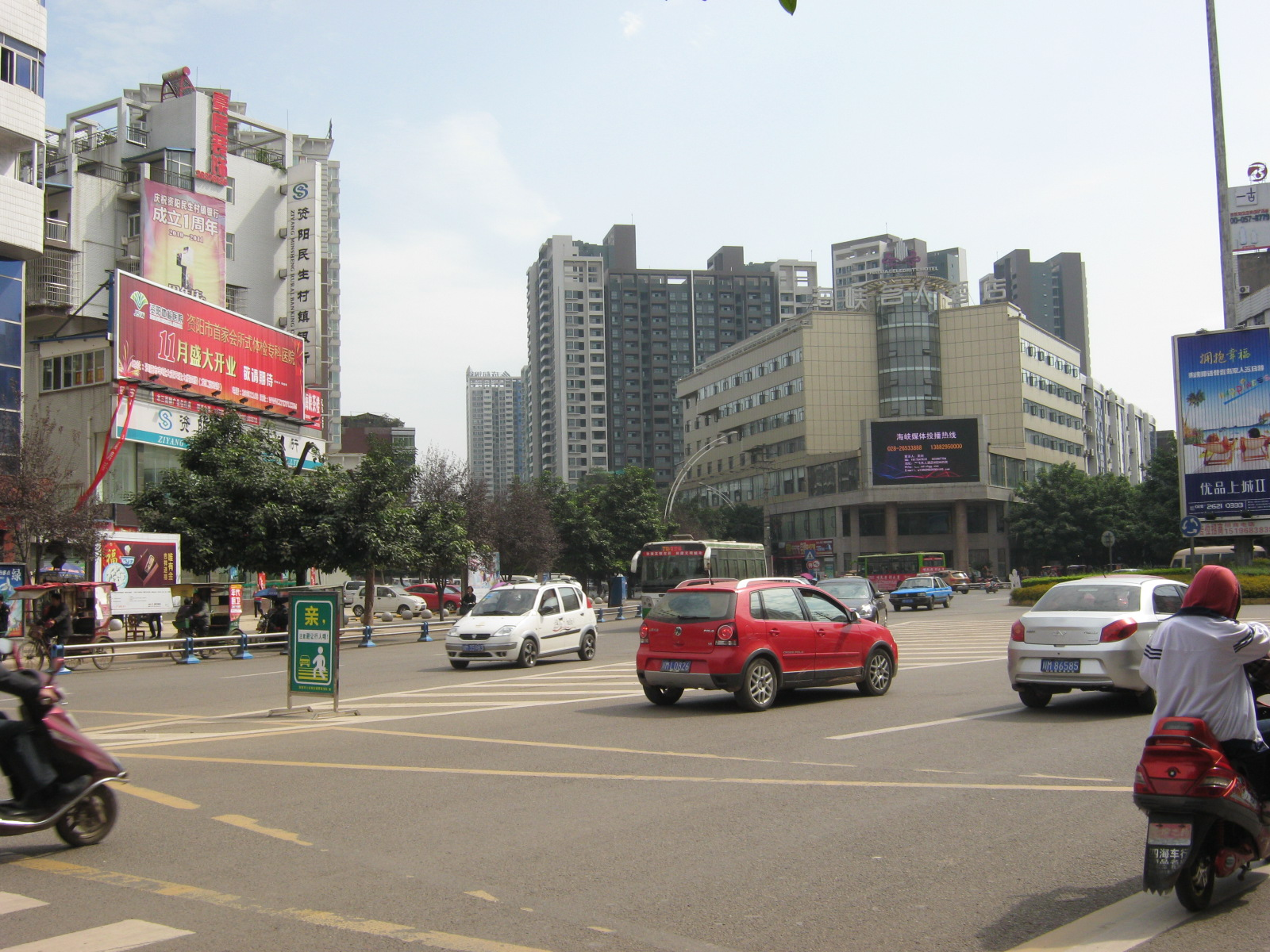
- Ziyang in 2012

- Location of Ziyang in Sichuan
- Coordinates (Ziyang municipal government): 30°07′44″N 104°37′37″E
- Country: People's Republic of China
- Province: Sichuan
- Municipal seat: Yanjiang District

Area
  - Prefecture-level city: 5,748 km^{2} (2,219 sq mi)
  - Urban: 1,633 km^{2} (631 sq mi)
  - Metro: 1,633 km^{2} (631 sq mi)

Population (2020 census)
  - Prefecture-level city: 2,308,631
  - Density: 401.6/km^{2} (1,040/sq mi)
  - Urban: 867,119
  - Urban density: 531.0/km^{2} (1,375/sq mi)
  - Metro: 867,119
  - Metro density: 531.0/km^{2} (1,375/sq mi)

GDP
  - Prefecture-level city: CN¥ 127.0 billion US$ 20.4 billion
  - Per capita: CN¥ 35,702; US$ 5,732
- Time zone: UTC+8 (China Standard)
- Area code: 028
- ISO 3166 code: CN-SC-20
- Website: www.ziyang.gov.cn

Ziyang (simplified Chinese: 资阳; traditional Chinese: 資陽; pinyin: Zīyáng; Wade–Giles: Tzu-yang) is a prefecture-level city in eastern Sichuan province, China. It is bordered by the provincial capital of Chengdu to the northwest, Deyang to the north, Suining to the northeast, Chongqing municipality to the east, and Neijiang to the west. Its development is going to be very important because of the proximity of Chengdu new Airport and economic zone. As of the 2020 Chinese census, Ziyang's total population was 2,308,631 inhabitants whom 867,119 lived in the built-up (or metro) area made of Yanjiang District.

== Subdivisions ==
Map
#	Name	Hanzi	Hanyu Pinyin	Population (2010)	Area (km^{2})	Density (/km^{2})
1	Yanjiang District	雁江区	Yànjiāng Qū	905,729	1,633	554
2	Lezhi County	乐至县	Lèzhì Xiàn	546,773	1,424	384
3	Anyue County	安岳县	Ānyuè Xiàn	1,141,347	2,690	424

== Government and infrastructure ==
Sichuan Provincial Women's Prison is in Yangma Town (养马镇), Jianyang, which was previously under the jurisdiction of Ziyang.

== Climate ==
Climate data for Ziyang, elevation 417 m (1,368 ft), (1991–2020 normals, extremes 1981–present)
Month	Jan	Feb	Mar	Apr	May	Jun	Jul	Aug	Sep	Oct	Nov	Dec	Year
Record high °C (°F)	19.4 (66.9)	23.4 (74.1)	33.5 (92.3)	35.4 (95.7)	38.0 (100.4)	36.7 (98.1)	41.5 (106.7)	42.4 (108.3)	38.2 (100.8)	32.5 (90.5)	25.6 (78.1)	19.4 (66.9)	42.4 (108.3)
Mean daily maximum °C (°F)	10.0 (50.0)	13.3 (55.9)	19.1 (66.4)	24.3 (75.7)	28.0 (82.4)	29.7 (85.5)	31.8 (89.2)	32.3 (90.1)	26.4 (79.5)	21.5 (70.7)	16.8 (62.2)	11.4 (52.5)	22.1 (71.7)
Daily mean °C (°F)	6.8 (44.2)	9.4 (48.9)	14.3 (57.7)	19.0 (66.2)	22.7 (72.9)	25.0 (77.0)	26.9 (80.4)	27.1 (80.8)	22.5 (72.5)	18.0 (64.4)	13.3 (55.9)	8.2 (46.8)	17.8 (64.0)
Mean daily minimum °C (°F)	4.2 (39.6)	6.5 (43.7)	10.6 (51.1)	14.8 (58.6)	18.5 (65.3)	21.4 (70.5)	23.4 (74.1)	23.4 (74.1)	19.9 (67.8)	15.8 (60.4)	10.9 (51.6)	5.9 (42.6)	14.6 (58.3)
Record low °C (°F)	−3.4 (25.9)	0.2 (32.4)	−0.3 (31.5)	5.5 (41.9)	9.1 (48.4)	14.9 (58.8)	17.9 (64.2)	16.5 (61.7)	13.0 (55.4)	4.7 (40.5)	1.0 (33.8)	−2.6 (27.3)	−3.4 (25.9)
Average precipitation mm (inches)	10.0 (0.39)	14.0 (0.55)	26.4 (1.04)	50.7 (2.00)	82.9 (3.26)	141.0 (5.55)	171.4 (6.75)	180.2 (7.09)	106.6 (4.20)	44.2 (1.74)	16.3 (0.64)	9.5 (0.37)	853.2 (33.58)
Average precipitation days (≥ 0.1 mm)	7.7	7.2	9.6	11.6	12.7	14.2	14.0	12.5	14.3	13.7	7.7	6.4	131.6
Average snowy days	0.6	0.4	0	0	0	0	0	0	0	0	0	0.3	1.3
Average relative humidity (%)	82	78	73	72	70	78	81	80	83	84	83	83	79
Mean monthly sunshine hours	53.8	70.9	111.0	147.1	150.1	130.0	160.5	172.0	97.7	69.6	67.7	49.6	1,280
Percentage possible sunshine	17	22	30	38	35	31	38	42	27	20	21	16	28
Source: China Meteorological Administration all-time extreme temperature all-time January high

== Demographics ==
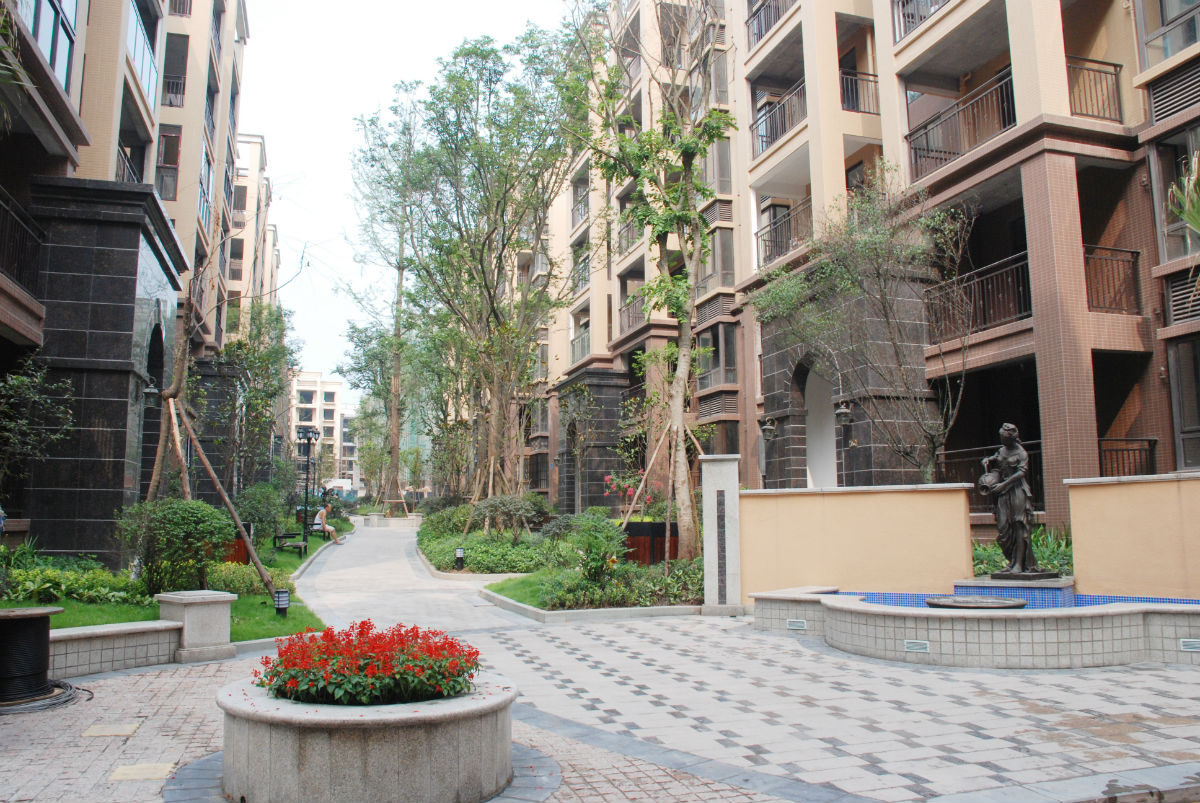
Apartments in Lezhi County

Ziyang's permanent population is approximately 2.503 million in 2019. Ziyang's population has been experiencing a steady decline during the 2010s, with its population in 2010 standing at approximately 3.665 million people.

Ziyang's hukou/registered population is substantially higher than its permanent population, with its hukou population standing at 3.422 million in 2019. This is likely due to migration to other regions, where higher wages can be earned. Similar to how Ziyang's permanent population has declined throughout the 2010s, Ziyang's hukou population has also fallen from 5.011 million in 2010.

=== Urbanization ===
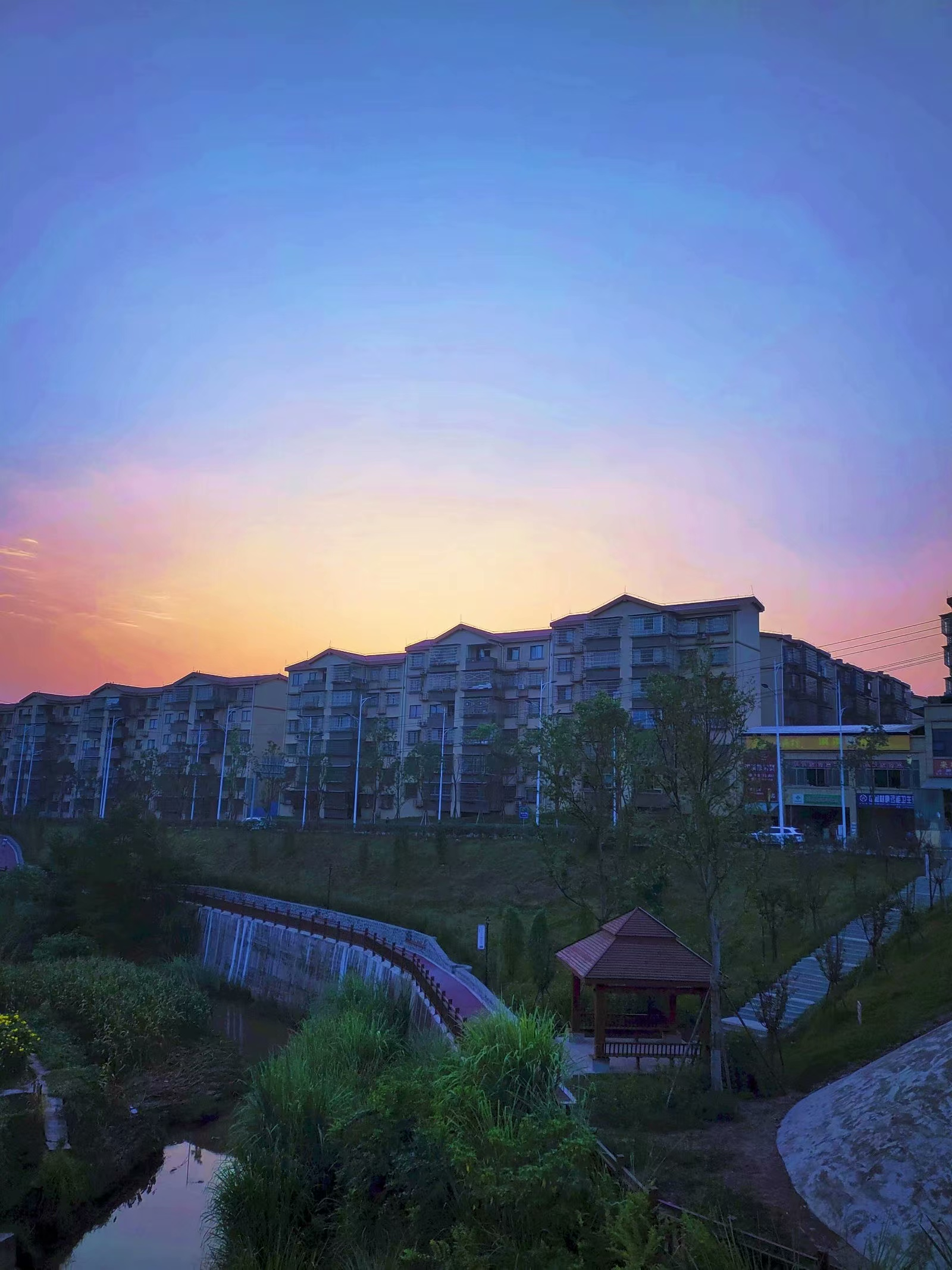
A street photo of Zhonghe Town

As of 2019, 44.15% of Ziyang's population lives in urban areas, below Sichuan's total of 53.79%. Ziyang's urbanization rate has experienced substantial growth in the 2010s, rising from 32.73% in 2010. This reflects a broader trend of urbanization in China, and also within Sichuan, which saw its own urbanization rate stand at 40.18% in 2010. At the county-level, 54.25% of Yanjiang District is urbanized as of 2019, 39.39% of Lezhi County is urbanized, and 37.63% of Anyue County is urbanized.

=== Vital statistics ===
Ziyang's birth rate in 2019 is 6.33‰ (per thousand), well below the Sichuan rate of 10.70‰; however, Ziyang's death rate of 5.64‰ is also below the Sichuan total of 7.09‰. This gives Ziyang a rate of natural increase of 0.69‰, below Sichuan's rate of 3.61‰.

== Economy ==
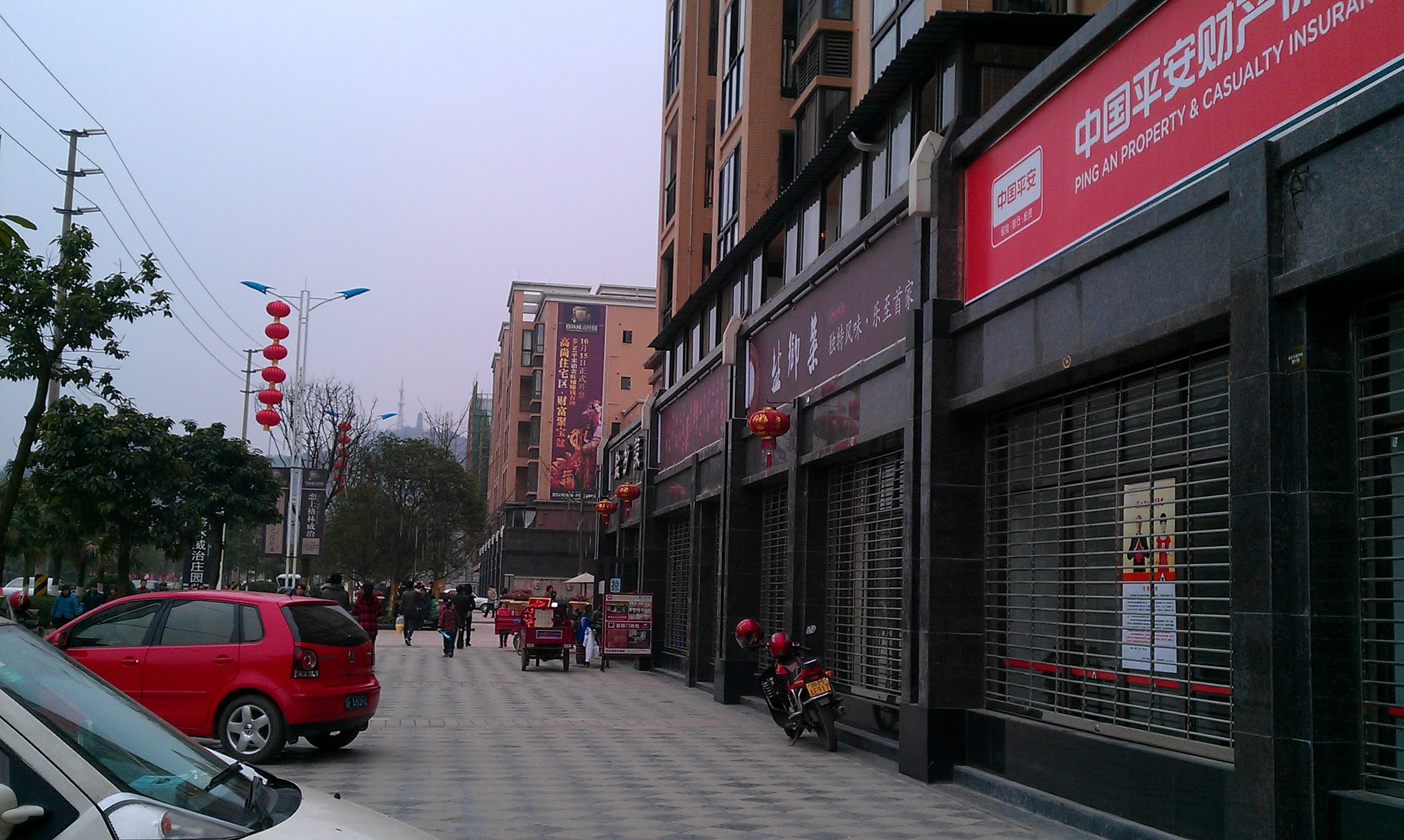
Storefronts in Lezhi County

As of 2019, Ziyang has a gross domestic product (GDP) of 77.780 billion RMB, of which, 14.206 billion RMB (18.26%) comes from the city's primary sector, 23.765 billion RMB (30.55%) comes from the city's secondary sector, and 39.809 billion RMB (51.18%) comes from the city's tertiary sector. Compared to Sichuan as a whole, Ziyang is more reliant on its primary sector, which makes up just 10.31% of Sichuan's GDP, less reliant on its secondary sector, which makes up 37.25% of Sichuan's GDP, and about as equally reliant on its tertiary sector, which makes up about 52.46% of Sichuan's GDP. Despite comprising just 18.26% of Ziyang's GDP, the city's primary sector employs 49.1% of Ziyang's 1.7794 million workers, with the secondary sector and tertiary sector employing 23.4% and 27.5% of Ziyang's workforce, respectively.

Ziyang Gross Domestic Product by sector and jurisdiction (RMB, million)
Jurisdiction	Primary sector	Secondary sector	Tertiary sector	Total
Yanjiang District	4,509.17	11,994.37	17,327.70	33,831.24
Lezhi County	3,100.33	6,123.03	9,496.32	18,719.68
Anyue County	6,596.61	5,647.17	12,984.77	25,228.55
Ziyang	14,206.11	23,764.57	39,808.79	77,779.47

As of 2019, Ziyang's gross domestic product per capita totals 31,019 RMB, well below Sichuan's total of 55,774 RMB per capita. Yanjiang District has a GDP per capita of 36,713 RMB, Lezhi County has a GDP per capita of 37,514 RMB, and Anyue County has a GDP per capita of 23,209.

Wages in Ziyang are also slightly below the Sichuan average, with wages in Ziyang averaging 62,340 RMB per year, compared to an average of 69,267 RMB for Sichuan as a whole. State-owned enterprises in Ziyang pay significantly better than their private sector counterparts, paying an average of 81,018 RMB per year, although this too is below the Sichuan average of 97,330 RMB per year. The average disposable income of Ziyang's urban residents is 36,236 RMB, significantly higher than the rural average of 17,592 RMB.

The total retail sales of consumer goods in Ziyang totaled 38.705 billion RMB in 2019.

Ziyang's gross domestic product growth is largely in line with Sichuan as a whole, growing by 7.0% in 2019, compared to 7.5% for Sichuan as a whole. Like Sichuan as a whole, Ziyang's GDP rose by double-digit percentages in the early 2010s, before slowing down to high single-digit growth during the latter half of the decade.

Major sources of employment in Ziyang outside of the primary sector include construction, manufacturing, and in hotels and catering. The highest paying industry in Ziyang is the health and social services industry, which pays an average of 98,134 RMB per year, slightly below the Sichuan average of 102,904 RMB.

In 2019, Ziyang had an urban unemployment rate of 3.7%, slightly higher than the Sichuan total of 3.3%.

The city operated at a trade surplus in 2019, exporting 139.76 million RMB worth of goods and services out of China, and importing 82.65 million RMB worth of goods and services from outside of China.

== Education ==
Ziyang is home to 172 primary schools, which are staffed by 7,191 teachers, and serve 166,798 students. The city also has 197 regular secondary schools, which are staffed by 12,067 teachers, and serve 149,862 students.

== Transportation ==
=== Rail ===
Ziyang Railway Station

Ziyangbei (Ziyang North) Railway Station

=== Metro Transit ===
Chengdu Metro Line S3 (Ziyang Line)

=== Highway ===
China National Highway 321, China National Highway 351 transit.

=== Air ===
Chengdu Tianfu International Airport
