= List of prisons in Sichuan =

This is a list of prisons within Sichuan province of the People's Republic of China.

Name	Enterprise name	City/County/District/Prefecture	Village/Town	Established	Notes
Aba Prefecture Prison		Mao County, Ngawa Tibetan and Qiang Autonomous Prefecture	Fengyi	1962	A prison to house prisoners from ethnic minorities
Bazhong Prison	Brickyard	Bazhong			
Binjiang Prison		Longquanyi District, Chengdu	Dabao, Luodai		
Chongzhou Prison	Wanjia Coal Mine; Bottle Cap Plant	Chongzhou, Chengdu	Wanjia		
Chuanbei Prison	Sichuan Province Wangcang Coal and Iron Factory; Prison Power Plant; Prison Cement Factory	Wangcang County, Guangyuan	Jiachuan	1952	
Chuandong Prison	Automobile Repair Shop; Dazhu Laopdong Factory	Dazhu County		1952	
Chuannan Prison	Furong Coal Mine; Chuannan Special Cement Plant	Gong County, Sichuan, Yibin	Xunchang	1965	
Chuanxi Prison	Sichuan Province Miaoxi Tea Co.	Longquanyi District, Chengdu		1953	At its peak held more than 9,000 inmates
Chuanzhong Prison	Chengdu Machine Tool Factory	Chengdu		1958	Over 3,000 inmates mostly life or commuted death sentences
Dachuan Prison	Dachuan 404 Plant	Luojiang County, Dazhou	Dongba		
Dalu Prison	Dalu Coal Mine	Xuanhan County, Dazhou	Tiansheng		
Deyang Prison	Deyang City Huangxu 95; Deyang Brickyard; Deyang Machine Works	Deyang	Huangxu		
Emei Prison			Emeishan City		
Ganzi Prison	Xinduqiao Farm	Kangding, Garzê Tibetan Autonomous Prefecture	Xinduqiao		
Gongya Prison		Hongya County			
Guangyuan Prison	Rongshan Coal Mine; Vehicle Repair Factory; Machine Works; Guangyuan Bingniao Natural Mineral Water Co.	Lizhou District, Guangyuan	Rongshan	1954	Mineral water of Bingniao brand is from there
Hanwangshan Prison	Tea Processing Factory; Cement Factory	Gao County, Yibin	Chuanxin	1951	Has held 30,000 prisoners in 54 years.
Huaying Prison	Huaying Coal Mine; Cement Factory	Huaying	Xikou		
Jianyang Juvenile Offender Detachment		Jianyang, Sichuan			
Jinjiang Prison		Shuangliu County, Chengdu	Zhonghe		
Jintang Prison		Jintang County, Chengdu			
Leimaping Prison	Leimaping Farm; Mahu Tea Farm	Leibo County	Xining	1952	
Leshan Prison		Shawan District, Leshan			
Liangshan Prison		Xichang, Liangshan Yi Autonomous Prefecture			A national minorities prison
Luzhou Prison	Luzhou Gunny Sack Mill	Luzhou			
Meishan Prison	Jianxin Chemical Plant	Dongpo District, Meishan	Wansheng	1952	Currently, main product is “Chuanjian” brand industrial anhydrous sulphuric sodium.
Mianyang Prison	Xinkang Asbestos Mine Chuanbei Xinsheng Printing House	Mianyang	Wujia		Produces "Shimian Hong" and "Xinkang Hong" granite panels.
Nanbaoshan Prison	Nanbaoshan Tea Factory	Nanbaoshan, Qionglai			Produced high quality tea for customers within the government, closed before 2007
Nanchong Prison	Southwest Gas Engine Parts General Factory;			1952	
Nanxi Prison	Ximen Farm			1951	closed in 1964
Panxi Prison	Huidong Lead and Zinc Mine; Xichang Smelter	Huidong County, Sichuan, Liangshan Yi Autonomous Prefecture	Qianxin	1958	Main product is “Liangshan” brand zinc.
Peng'an Prison	Peng'an 9-1 Factory; Nanchong Qinglian Brickyard	Nanchong		1970	Its inmates serve sentences of ten years and more
Pingwu Prison	Pingwu Quarry	Pingwu County			
Sichuan Provincial Women's Prison	Sichuan Jianyang Yangmahe Clothing Factory	Jianyang, Sichuan	Yangmahe, Yangma Town (养马镇)		
Qiaowo Prison	Qiaowo Farm; Qiaowo Prison Machinery Factory	Puge County, Liangshan Yi Autonomous Prefecture	Qiaowo		
Sichuan Prov. Chengdu Juvenile Offender Detachment		Shuangliu County, Chengdu	Jinbu, Baijia		Holds 14- to 18-year-olds, 2,000 inmates in 2005
Suining Prison		Suining			
Wumaping Prison	Wumaping Tea Farm	Muchuan County, Leshan		1966	
Xingwen Prison		Chengdu			
Xinyuan Prison	Coal Mine and Thermoelectrical Plant				
Ya'an Prison	Ya'an Quarry; Ya'an Automobile Parts Factory				There was a 22-hour prison riot in 1997
Yanyuan Prison	Zonghe Farm	Xichang or/and Yanyuan County		1958	
Zhicheng Prison	Zhicheng Farm; Cement Plant	Tongjiang County	Zhicheng		
Zhongjiang Prison	Wangcang Coal Mine	Zhongjiang County			
Zigong Prison	Zigong Machine Tool Factory	Ziliujing District, Zigong			1,500 inmates as of 2001

== Sources ==
- "Laogai Handbook 2007-2008" (PDF) (in Chinese and English). Washington, D.C.: Laogai Research Foundation. October 2008. pp. 437–460. ISBN 978-1-931550-25-3.
