= Zhang Yong (restaurateur) =

China-born Singaporean billionaire entrepreneur

- 张勇
- Born: 1969 or 1970 (age 56–57); Jianyang, Sichuan, China
- Citizenship: Singaporean
- Occupation: Restaurateur
- Years active: 1994–present
- Known for: Founder of Haidilao
- Title: Founder and CEO of Haidilao
- Spouse: Shu Ping (舒萍)
- Children: 1

Zhang Yong (Chinese: 张勇; pinyin: Zhāng Yǒng) is a Chinese-born Singaporean restaurateur. He is the founder of the Haidilao restaurant group, best known for its chain of hot pot restaurants. At the end of 2018, Haidilao Hot Pot had 466 direct-operated stores in operation in more than a hundred cities. Zhang also holds majority stake in Haidilao Catering, Haidilao International Holding and Yihai International.

== Life and career ==
Zhang was born and grew up in Jianyang, Sichuan, China. He started his career beginnings as a welder by profession, and did not eat in a restaurant until he was 19.

In 1994, he quit his job in a tractor factory and opened a restaurant with 4 tables to seat customers. The first Haidilao, which was cofounded by two couples, Zhang and his wife Shu Ping, and fellow business partners Shi Yonghong and his wife Li Haiyan.

Zhang's restaurant soon became the largest hot pot restaurant in town. A second restaurant, Lou Wai Lou, opened in 1998. In 2010, the company opened its own restaurant management training school. Zhang has stated that his business philosophy revolves around using hot pot as a medium through which Qi (器) and Dao (道) can be reunited.

== Personal life ==
=== Family ===
Zhang is married to Shu Ping, a co-founder and non-executive director of Sichuan Haidilao Catering. They have a son. In 2018, Zhang and his family emigrated to Singapore, where he later became a naturalised citizen.

=== Wealth ===
As of July 2021, Forbes estimated his net worth at US$15.8 billion, making him China's richest restaurateur. Forbes estimated in the same year that his fortune had fallen by US$2.4 billion after his company's stock value fell by 17%. He ranked #126 on Forbes' 2019 Billionaires list, making him the 3rd richest man in Singapore.

== Published work ==
- Learn from Hai Di Lao, 2011
