= List of administrative divisions of Chengdu =

List of administrative divisions of the City of Chengdu, Sichuan, China

Chengdu is the capital city of Sichuan Province and the most populous prefectural-level division in China. As of 2023, Chengdu is administratively divided into 12 districts, 5 county-level cities, and 3 counties.

== Administrative divisions ==
Map
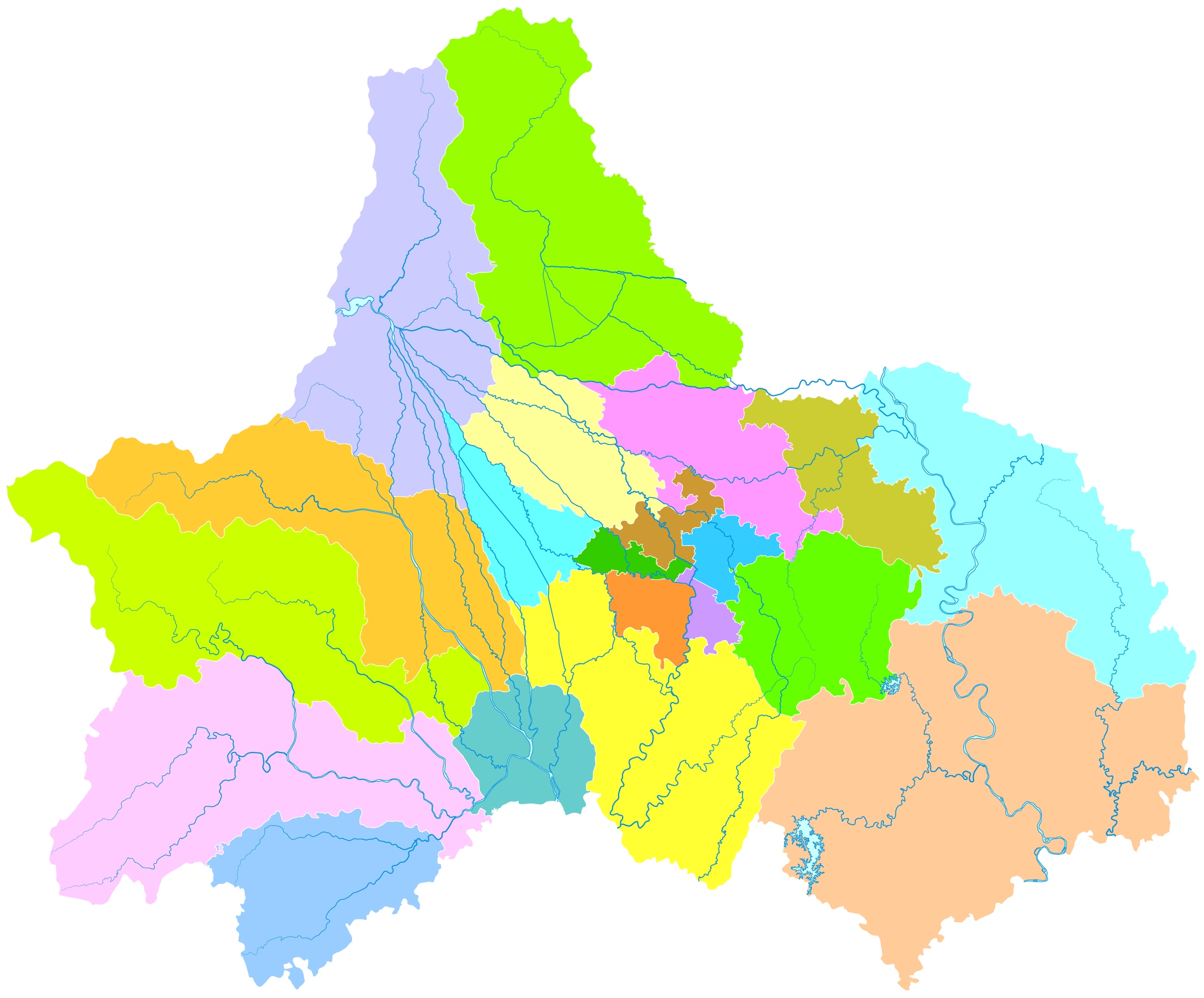

Name	Chinese	Pinyin	Population (2010)	Area (km²)	Density (/km²)
5 central urban districts
Jinjiang District (provincial seat)	锦江区	Jǐnjiāng Qū	690,422	61	11,318
Qingyang District	青羊区	Qīngyáng Qū	828,140	66	12,548
Jinniu District	金牛区	Jīnniú Qū	1,200,776	108	11,118
Wuhou District (city seat)	武侯区	Wǔhóu Qū	1,083,806	77	14,075
Chenghua District	成华区	Chénghuá Qū	938,785	109	8,613
7 (suburban) districts
Longquanyi District	龙泉驿区	Lóngquányì Qū	767,203	558	1,375
Qingbaijiang District	青白江区	Qīngbáijiāng Qū	381,792	392	974
Xindu District	新都区	Xīndū Qū	775,703	481	1,613
Wenjiang District	温江区	Wēnjiāng Qū	457,070	277	1,650
Shuangliu District	双流区	Shuāngliú Qū	1,158,516	1,067	1,086
Pidu District	郫都区	Pídū Qū	756,047	438	1,726
Xinjin District	新津区	Xīnjīn Qū	302,199	330	916
5 county-level cities
Dujiangyan	都江堰市	Dūjiāngyàn Shì	657,996	1,208	545
Pengzhou	彭州市	Péngzhōu Shì	762,887	1,420	537
Qionglai	邛崃市	Qiónglái Shì	612,753	1,384	443
Chongzhou	崇州市	Chóngzhōu Shì	661,120	1,090	607
Jianyang	简阳市	JiǎnYáng Shì	1,045,900	2,214	472
3 counties
Jintang County	金堂县	Jīntáng Xiàn	717,225	1,156	620
Dayi County	大邑县	Dàyì Xiàn	502,198	1,327	378
Pujiang County	蒲江县	Pújiāng Xiàn	239,562	583	411

=== Other management zones ===
- Tianfu New Area
- Chengdu Economic and Technological Development Zone
- Chengdu Hi-tech Industrial Development Zone
  - Chengdu Tianfu Software Park
  - Chengdu Export Processing Zone
