= Chengxiang railway station =

Railway station in Chengdu

Coordinates: 30°50′14.02″N 104°18′54.58″E

Chengxiang railway station 城厢站
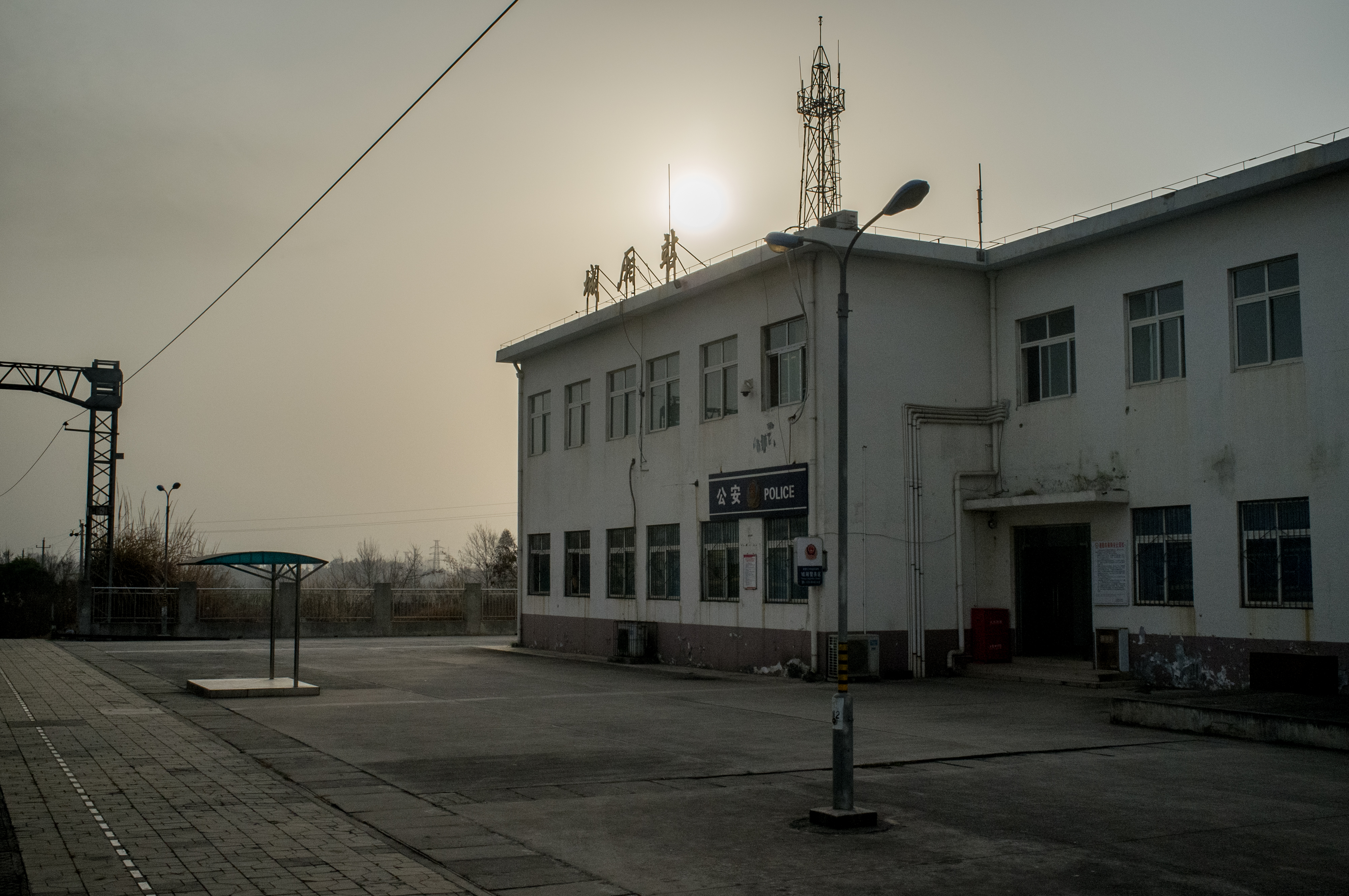
- Chengxiang railway station

General information
- Other names: Chengdu Container Center Railway Station
- Location: Chengxiang town, Qingbaijiang, Chengdu, Sichuan
- System: Freight station
- Operator: CR Chengdu

Other information
- Status: Operational
- Station code: 46502
- Classification: Third class station

History
- Opened: 2010
Location

Chengxiang railway station is a railway station in Chengxiang town, Qingbaijiang, Chengdu, the capital of Sichuan province. Dacheng railway line passes through this station. It also hosts the Chengdu International Railway Port, which is the starting point of the Chengdu end of the Rong'ou (Chengdu-Europe) Express Railway.

== History ==
On 3 July 2008, the Chengdu Railway Container Center Station (CRCCS) officially underwent construction, following which on December 2009, the Chengxiang railway station renovation and expansion project was launched.

CRCCS started its trial operation on 16 March 2010, with the first container train sent to Shanghai. Following this, the container business of Bali station (old Chengdu East railway station) was gradually shifted to the CRCCS.

On 12 May 2010, CRCCS officially opened the station as a freight station and finally on April 2017, the Chengxiang station joined the Sichuan Free Trade Zone as a significant part of the Chengdu Qingbaijiang Railway Port Area.

== Chengdu Railways Container Center ==
The Chengdu Railway Container Center Station (CRCCS) is located close to the Chengxiang station. CRCCS extends 8.4 km (5.2 mi) long from east to west, 850 m (2,790 ft) wide from north to south and covers an area of 115 acres (47 ha). The total construction cost of CRCCS station stood at CN¥ 759,000,000.

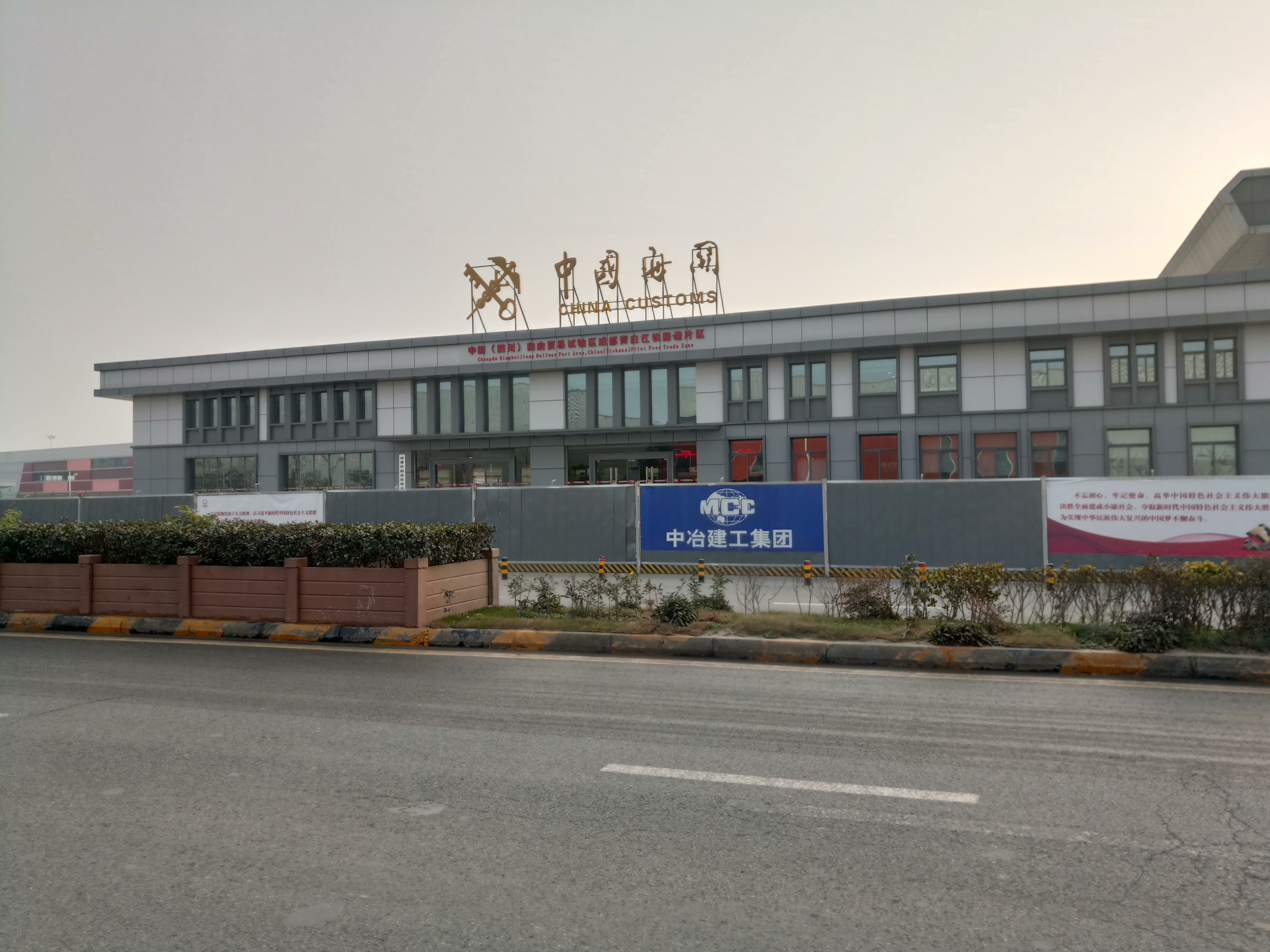
Customs building of Chengdu International Railway Port

CRCCS is the largest railway container center station in Asia, with a total of 5 bundles and 10 cargo handling tracks. The gantry cranes have a maximum lifting capacity of 40 tons and requires only one person to operate each crane. It takes about 5 minutes to hoist a single container.

The recently calculated annual estimates are—cargo throughput capacity is 1 million TEU, the transportation capacity is 13.67 million tons, and 12.5 pairs of container trains are operated daily. Meanwhile the projected annual estimates are—cargo throughput capacity is to become 2.5 million TEU, transportation capacity is to become 26.26 million tons, and 33 pairs of container trains are to be operated daily.

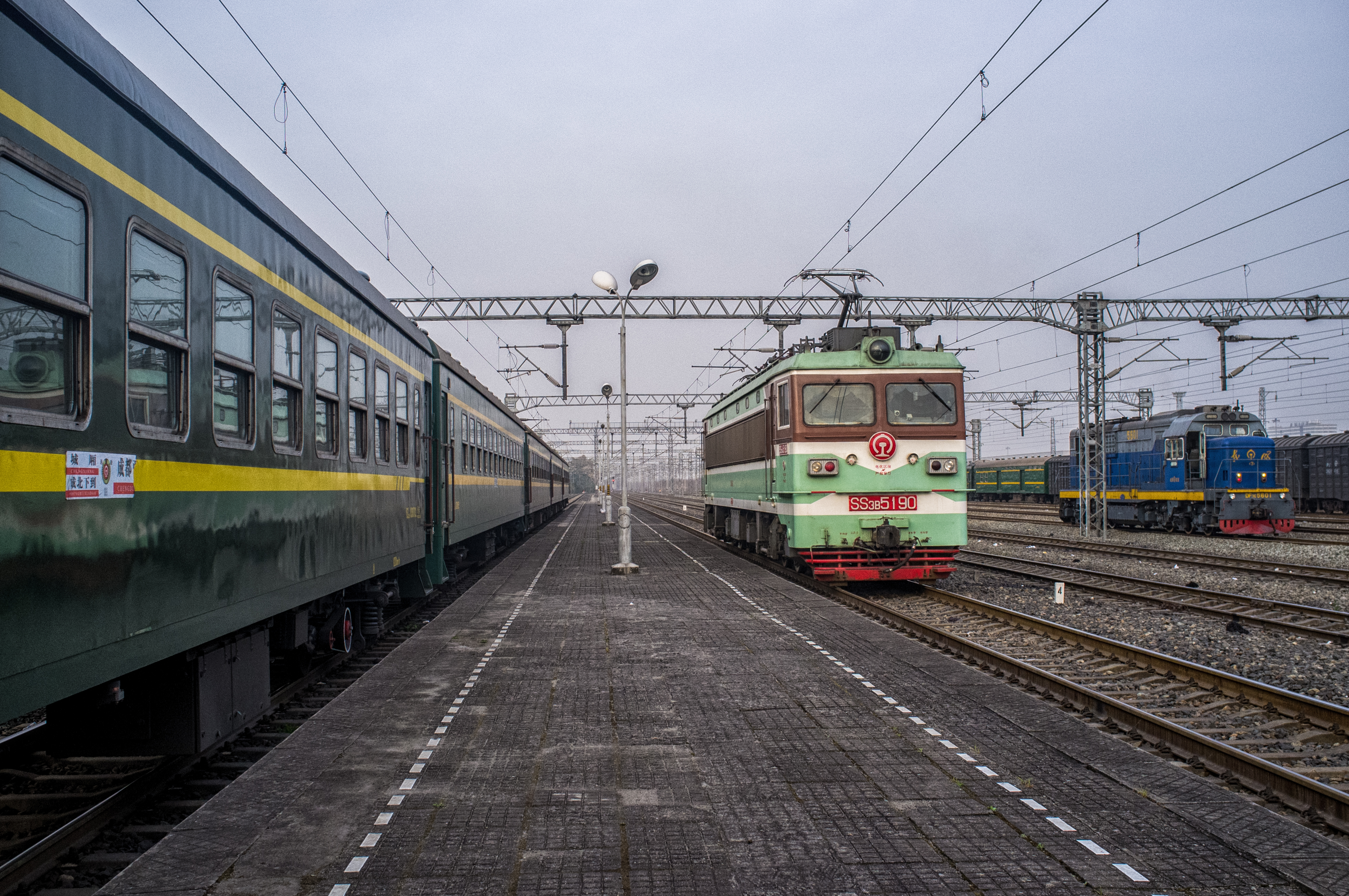
Chengxiang station of Dazhou-Chengdu Railway, with SS3B Locomotive

CRCCS is part of the China Railways' container center network, and it is located 319 km (198 mi) to the west of Chongqing Railway Container Center Station, 1,100 km (680 mi) to the north of Kunming Railway Container Center Station, and 658 km (409 mi) to the south of Xi'an Railway Container Center Station.

As of 2017, the Chengdu-Europe lines have sent over 1,000 trains, divided into the northern line (Chengdu to Moscow), the middle line (Chengdu to Łódź), and the southern line (Chengdu to Istanbul). The Chengxiang railway station acts as the starting point in Chengdu to facilitate trade of IT products using the middle line.

== Operations ==
At present, Chengxiang station is the main freight station of the Chengdu hub, and it mainly handles carloads and containers but not bulk cargo.

Preceding station	China Railway	Following station
Chengdu North towards Dazhou	Dazhou–Chengdu railway	Jintang towards Chengdu
