= Ke Mu San =

Dance and internet phenomenon in China

Ke Mu San (Chinese: 科目三; pinyin: Kē Mù Sān), also known as subject number three dance is an internet phenomenon originating in China. Believed to have originated from a wedding dance in Guangxi, the dance involves performers executing a series of hand movements, including quick twisting movements of the wrists while swinging their knees to the side, in sync with the folk song "一笑江湖" (pinyin: Yī Xiào Jiāng Hú; lit. 'One Smile Jianghu') as sung by Wen Ren Ting Shu (simplified Chinese: 闻人听書; traditional Chinese: 聞人聽書; pinyin: Wén Rén Tīng Shū). Gaining mainstream attention, restaurant chain Haidilao added the dance to their menu in November 2023.

== Origin ==
Believed to have originated from Zhu Kaihong, a Guangxi native, who first performed the dance to entertain the guests at his friend's wedding reception following the boredom of the marriage ceremony. Another netizen posted his own version of the dance on Douyin shortly after passing the subject 3 of his driving test, and the dance, after he was interrogated, was called Ke Mu San (transl. Subject three). The dance went viral on Douyin and other Chinese social media as it was set to the folk song "一笑江湖" (pinyin: Yī Xiào Jiāng Hú; lit. 'One Smile Jianghu') as sung by Wen Ren Ting Shu (simplified Chinese: 闻人听書; traditional Chinese: 聞人聽書; pinyin: Wén Rén Tīng Shū).

The viral dance drew a cultural phenomenon, which according to Shanghai Daily, suggests the three experiences of a native Guangxi person: singing folk songs as Subject One, slurping rice noodles as Subject Two, and dancing as Subject Three.

== Reception ==
Two influencers on Douyin posted a video of themselves dancing to Ke Mu San while wearing Haidilao uniforms. The video received nearly three million likes. On 31 December 2023, a Guinness World Record for the highest number of people dancing Ke Mu San both online and offline was set by a group of a few hundred people in Shenyang. In January 2024, at an event held at the Chinese Embassy in the United States, Ke Mu San was also performed by Chinese and American youths dressed in traditional Chinese clothes.

== Controversy ==
Following the introduction of Ke Mu San in Haidilao outlets, there were concerns over the disturbance to diners and staff welfare. In an incident at an outlet in Huai'an, Jiangsu, China, two diners argued over the noise from the dance, ending in police intervention. In addition, some employees reported feeling stressed over learning the dance when they were "so busy".

On 15 January 2024, following an announcement by the Taiwanese Ningxia Night Market Facebook, that a Ke Mu San dance contest will be held 10 days later, there was a backlash claiming the dance as "Chinese unification by dance". (Note: The word for "Chinese unification by dance" in Chinese (Chinese: 舞统台湾; pinyin: Wǔ tǒng táiwān) is a homophonic pun to "Chinese unification by force" (Chinese: 武统台湾; pinyin: Wǔ tǒng táiwān)) In response, the night market apologized, stating that their original intention was to bring young people together "through music, dance and food in a healthy and interesting manner". However, they added that the contest would still proceed. In response to the backlash, spokesperson for the Taiwan Affairs Office Chen Binghua said that the behaviour was "Anti-China to the point of anti-intellectualism".
