= Youxin, Sichuan =

Youxin 又新镇
- Town
- Youxinzhen
- Location in Sichuan
- Coordinates: 30°45′10″N 104°47′11″E
- Country: People's Republic of China
- Province: Sichuan
- Autonomous prefecture: Chengdu
- County: Jintang County

Area
  - Total: 48.57 km^{2} (18.75 sq mi)

Population (2010)
  - Total: 24,786
  - Density: 510.3/km^{2} (1,322/sq mi)
- Time zone: UTC+8 (China Standard)

Youxin (Chinese: 又新) is a town in Jintang County, Chengdu, Sichuan, China. In 2010, Youxin had a total population of 24,786: 12,555 males and 12,231 females: 5,663 aged under 14, 15,760 aged between 15 and 65 and 3,363 aged over 65. As of 2023, it administers the following three residential communities and six villages:

- Caijiahe Community (蔡家河社区)
- Jingle Community (净乐社区)
- Yongle Community (永乐社区)
- Zhuxin Village (祝新村)
- Baoding Village (宝鼎村)
- Sanyuan Village (三元村)
- Hongyuan Village (红缘村)
- Youfangyan Village (油坊堰村)
- Wan'an Village (万安村)
