= Longquan Mountains =

Mountain range in Sichuan, China

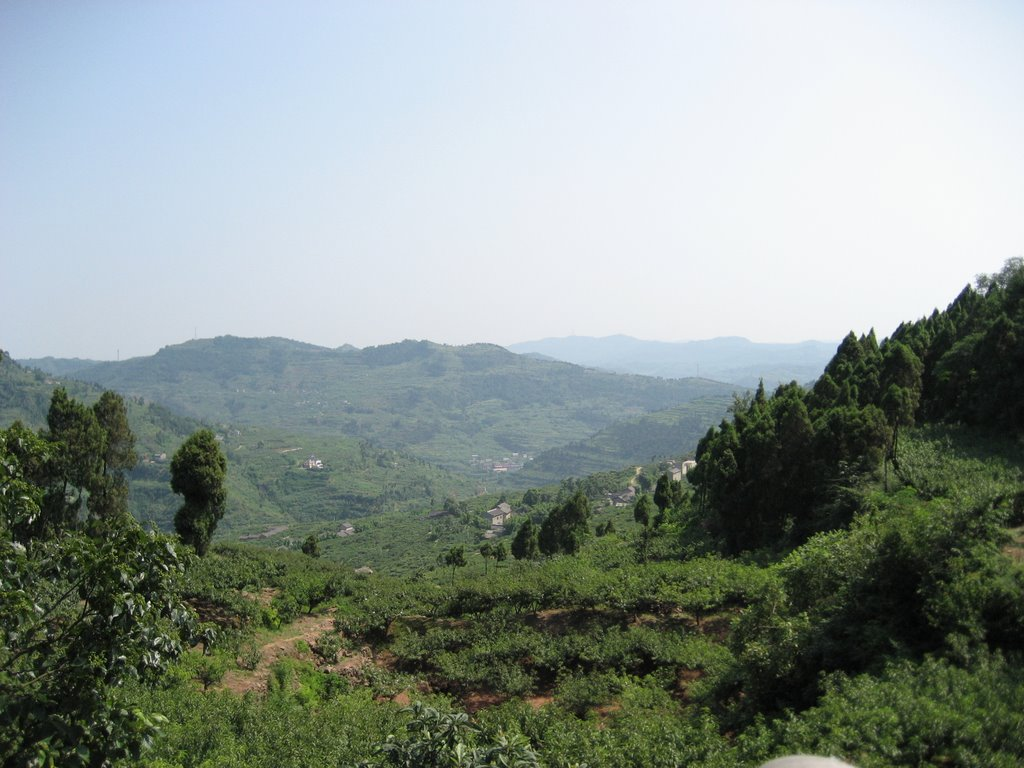
- Forested mountains in Longquanyi District

Highest point
- Peak: Ximei Mountain
- Elevation: 1,045 m (3,428 ft)
- Coordinates: 30°56′33″N 104°32′37″E

Naming
- Native name: 龙泉山脉 (Chinese)

Geography
- Country: China
- Province: Sichuan

The Longquan Mountains (Chinese: 龙泉山脉; pinyin: Lóngquán shānmài) are a low-lying range of mountains in Sichuan, China. The mountains are 200 km (120 mi) long, on average 10 km (6.2 mi) wide, and form a ridge-like barrier between the Chengdu Plain and the rest of the Sichuan Basin. They range from Deyang in the north to Leshan in the south. The highest point of the range is Ximei Mountain (西眉山) at 1,045 m (3,428 ft) in Zhongjiang County. The Longquan are bisected by the Tuo River in the north that forms a 400 m (1,300 ft)-deep gorge through the mountains.

The Longquan Mountains are the westernmost detachment fold in the Sichuan Basin. The other detachment folds the region are found in the east of the basin, so the Longquan stand out relative to the alluvial Chengdu Plain in the west and the Sichuan Basin's rolling hills to the east. The Longquan Mountains have shown tectonic activity in the past, although pressure built up at the edge of the Sichuan Basin now tends to release along the Longmenshan Fault, further west.

The eastern suburbs of Chengdu reach the base of the Longquan in Longquanyi District. Approximately 23% of the Longquan are still forested, while agricultural uses, temples, and small villages cover the remaining portions. Luodai Ancient Town, a popular tourist destination, is found at the foothills of the Longquan. As a major north-south range directly to the east of Chengdu, most transportation links between the capital city and the rest of the Sichuan Basin cross through the mountains including the Chengdu–Chongqing Railway and G76 and G42 expressways.
