= Sichuan Provincial Women's Prison =

Chinese prison

Sichuan Provincial Women's Prison (四川省女子监狱 Sìchuān Shěng nǚzǐ jiānyù) is a women's prison in Yangma Town (养马镇), Jianyang, Chengdu, Sichuan, China, 50 kilometres (31 mi) away from the center of Chengdu (Jianyang was previously administered by Ziyang and not Chengdu). It is over 20,000 square metres (0.020 km^{2}) large. It became a women's prison in 1998. The Sichuan Provincial Administration of Prisons operates this facility.

It has a prison clinic/hospital with 44 employees.

== See also ==
- List of prisons in Sichuan
