= Longquanyi, Chengdu =

District of Chengdu, Sichuan, China

Longquanyi 龙泉驿区
- District
- District of Longquanyi, City of Chengdu
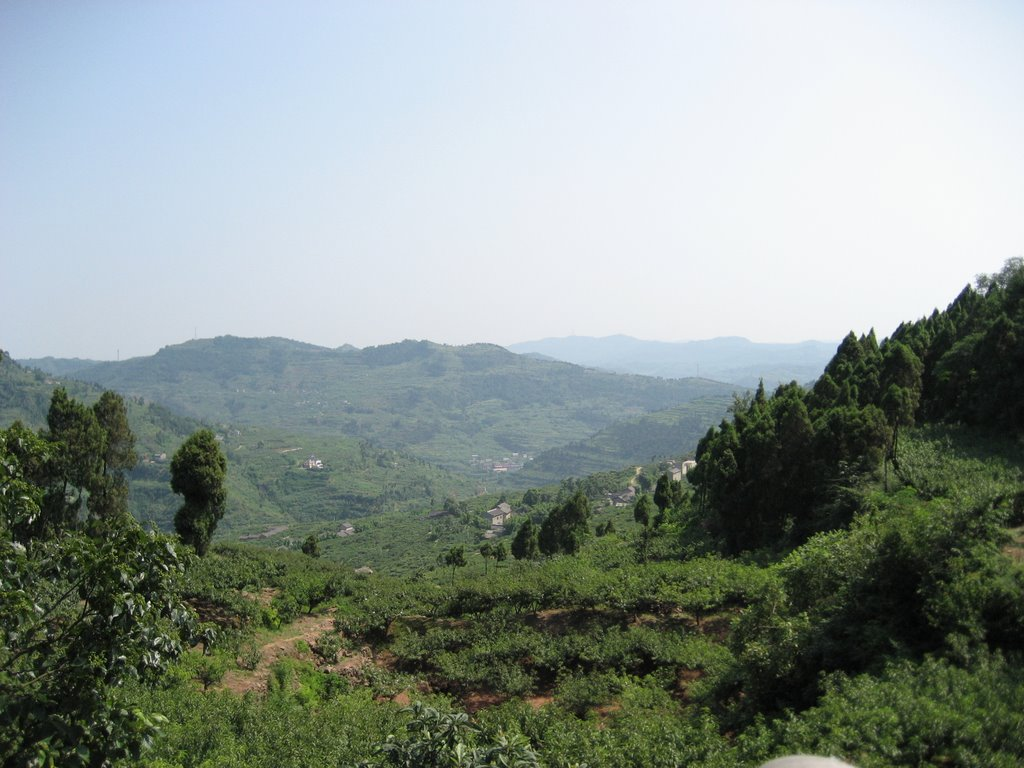
- Longquan Mountains in Longquanyi

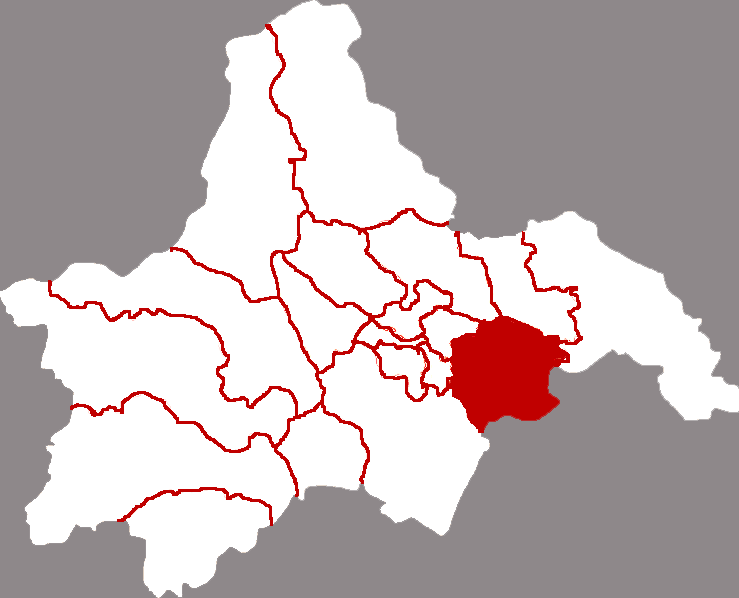
- Location of Longquanyi in Chengdu

- Location in Sichuan
- Coordinates: 30°35′24″N 104°18′24″E
- Country: China
- Province: Sichuan
- Sub-provincial city: Chengdu

Area
  - Total: 556 km^{2} (215 sq mi)

Population (2020)
  - Total: 1,346,210
  - Density: 2,420/km^{2} (6,270/sq mi)
- Time zone: UTC+8 (China Standard)
- Postal code: 6101XX

Longquanyi District (Chinese: 龙泉驿区; pinyin: Lóngquányì Qū) is a suburban district of the City of Chengdu, Sichuan, China. Longquan District covers parts of the southeastern suburbs. In 1960, with the approval of the State Council, Chengdu Longquan Station District was officially established. In 2000, Longquanyi District was approved as a national economic and technological development zone, becoming an important economic center in the east of Chengdu.

The population is over half a million. It borders the prefecture-level city of Ziyang to the southeast. Longquanyi has been designated as a high-tech development district, with investment mainly focused in the urban areas.

Many hillsides that have been used to farm will be converted by the local government to forest areas, as the district finds tourism more profitable than trying to grow crops on mountainsides.

== Administrative divisions ==
Longquanyi District administers 7 subdistricts and 3 towns:

- Longquan Subdistrict (龙泉街道)
- Damian Subdistrict (大面街道)
- Shiling Subdistrict (十陵街道)
- Tong'an Subdistrict (同安街道)
- Xihe Subdistrict (西河街道)
- Baihe Subdistrict (柏合街道)
- Dong'an Subdistrict (东安街道)
- Luodai Town (洛带镇)
- Hong'an Town (洪安镇)
- Shanquan Town (山泉镇)

== Tourism ==
Longquanyi district is one of the most popular places to travel in Sichuan. There are many famous tourist attractions in Longquanyi District.There is a representative Luodai town. Luodai Town is located in the eastern suburbs of Chengdu, north of Longquanyi District, known as the first Hakka ancient town in Western China, and is also known as "the world's Luodai, the eternal Hakka". Luodai Town has a long history, and according to legend, it became a street in the Han Dynasty, named "Wanjing Street".

== Climate ==
Climate data for Longquanyi, elevation 505 m (1,657 ft), (1991–2020 normals, extremes 1981–present)
Month	Jan	Feb	Mar	Apr	May	Jun	Jul	Aug	Sep	Oct	Nov	Dec	Year
Record high °C (°F)	18.9 (66.0)	24.4 (75.9)	32.1 (89.8)	33.3 (91.9)	36.5 (97.7)	36.5 (97.7)	39.6 (103.3)	41.2 (106.2)	36.2 (97.2)	31.1 (88.0)	25.7 (78.3)	18.3 (64.9)	41.2 (106.2)
Mean daily maximum °C (°F)	9.7 (49.5)	12.6 (54.7)	17.7 (63.9)	23.4 (74.1)	27.2 (81.0)	29.1 (84.4)	30.8 (87.4)	30.6 (87.1)	26.1 (79.0)	21.1 (70.0)	16.6 (61.9)	11.1 (52.0)	21.3 (70.4)
Daily mean °C (°F)	6.1 (43.0)	8.6 (47.5)	12.9 (55.2)	18.1 (64.6)	21.9 (71.4)	24.4 (75.9)	26.1 (79.0)	25.7 (78.3)	22.0 (71.6)	17.4 (63.3)	12.8 (55.0)	7.6 (45.7)	17.0 (62.5)
Mean daily minimum °C (°F)	3.4 (38.1)	5.8 (42.4)	9.6 (49.3)	14.1 (57.4)	17.9 (64.2)	20.8 (69.4)	22.7 (72.9)	22.3 (72.1)	19.2 (66.6)	15.0 (59.0)	10.2 (50.4)	5.1 (41.2)	13.8 (56.9)
Record low °C (°F)	−4.4 (24.1)	−2.2 (28.0)	−1.2 (29.8)	4.4 (39.9)	7.4 (45.3)	13.9 (57.0)	16.6 (61.9)	15.3 (59.5)	11.9 (53.4)	3.8 (38.8)	0.4 (32.7)	−4.0 (24.8)	−4.4 (24.1)
Average precipitation mm (inches)	8.8 (0.35)	11.7 (0.46)	23.3 (0.92)	44.2 (1.74)	68.9 (2.71)	124.1 (4.89)	196.4 (7.73)	211.1 (8.31)	119.9 (4.72)	40.5 (1.59)	13.9 (0.55)	6.9 (0.27)	869.7 (34.24)
Average precipitation days (≥ 0.1 mm)	6.8	7.2	9.3	11.1	12.9	15.0	15.7	14.4	14.1	12.9	6.6	5.1	131.1
Average snowy days	1.3	0.4	0	0	0	0	0	0	0	0	0	0.5	2.2
Average relative humidity (%)	81	78	74	73	71	77	82	82	84	83	81	81	79
Mean monthly sunshine hours	47.3	56.4	89.5	122.4	125.6	106.4	121.6	135.8	77.4	56.1	57.0	47.5	1,043
Percentage possible sunshine	15	18	24	31	30	25	28	33	21	16	18	15	23
Source: China Meteorological Administrationall-time extreme temperatureall-time July high

== Education ==
Longquanyi district is to home to the "Golden Phoenix" project – where junior high school students get free housing, school uniforms and a food allowance, and attend an urban boarding school.

As of November 2007, more than 3,000 students have already moved from their mountain villages to the city for their educations, almost two-thirds of them subsidized by the government. The district government has already spent 14.5 million yuan on the project, and will spend another 160 million.

Forty-two percent of the district is located in the poor, mountainous parts of Sichuan province. In 2006, all middle schools and high schools located in the poor regions were closed down, and the students transferred to central, urban schools. Many of the students' parents moved to town as well, and took jobs in the city.
