= Haidilao =

Chinese hot pot restaurant chain

Haidilao International Holding Ltd.

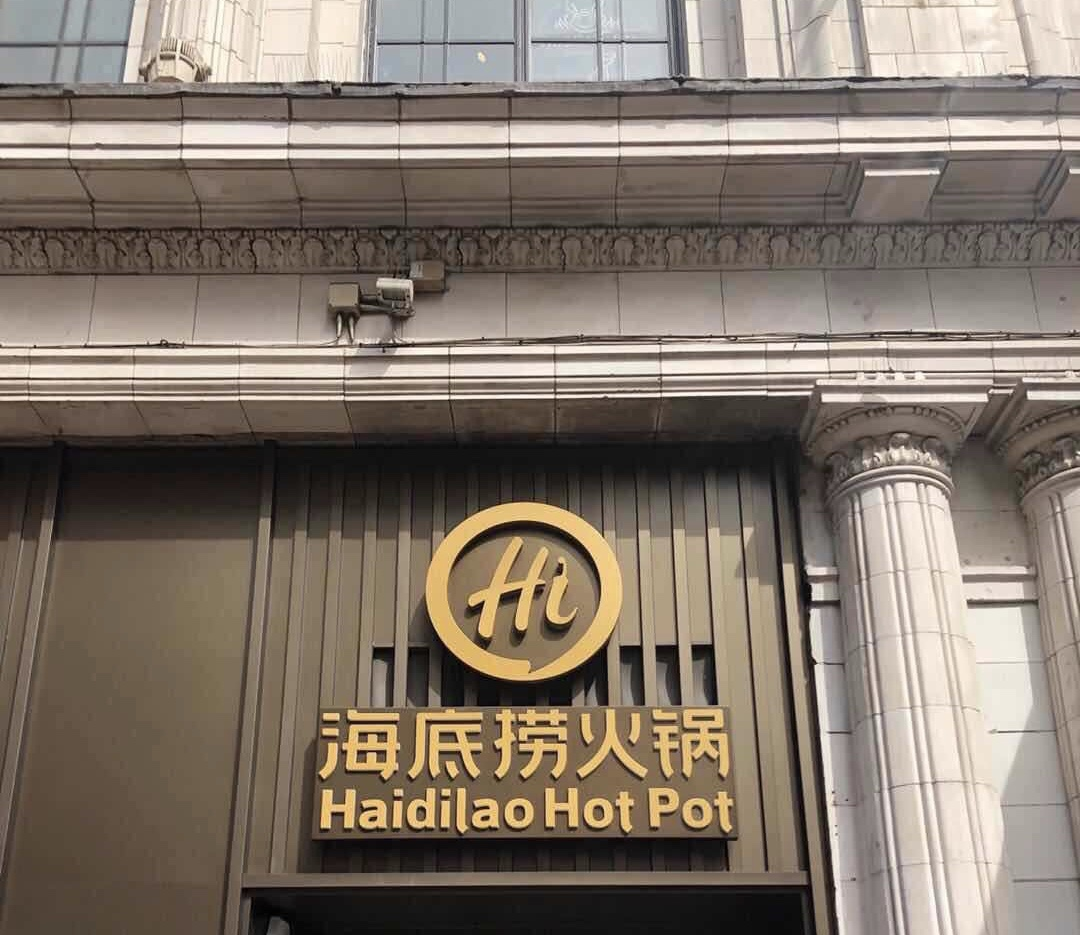
- A Haidilao location in London, England
- Type: Public
- Traded as: SEHK: 6862 Hang Seng Index component; SEHK: 9658 (Super Hi International)
- Industry: Hospitality
- Founded: March 20, 1994; 32 years ago
- Founder: Zhang Yong
- Headquarters: Paya Lebar, East Region, Singapore (Super Hi International); Changping District, Beijing, China (Haidilao International Holding Ltd)
- Number of locations: 1400
- Area served: Mainland China, Hong Kong, Macau, Australia, Cambodia, Canada, Indonesia, Japan, Malaysia, Philippines, Singapore, South Korea, Taiwan, Thailand, United Arab Emirates, United Kingdom, United States, Vietnam
- Key people: Zhang Yong (CEO)
- Products: Hot pot
- Revenue: US$5.9 billion (2025)
- Total assets: US$3.1 billion (2025)
- Number of employees: 125,620 (2025)
- Website: www.haidilao.com

Haidilao International Holding Ltd.
- Simplified Chinese: 海底捞国际控股有限公司
- Traditional Chinese: 海底撈國際控股有限公司
Transcriptions
Standard Mandarin
- Hanyu Pinyin: Hǎidǐlāo Guójì Kònggǔ Yǒuxiàngōngsī

Haidilao Hot Pot
- Simplified Chinese: 海底捞火锅
- Traditional Chinese: 海底撈火鍋
Transcriptions
Standard Mandarin
- Hanyu Pinyin: Hǎidǐlāo Huǒguō

Haidilao International Holding Ltd. or simply Haidilao (simplified Chinese: 海底捞; traditional Chinese: 海底撈) is a Chinese hot pot restaurant chain, typically operating under the trade name Haidilao Hot Pot. Founded in Jianyang, Sichuan in 1994 by Zhang Yong, it has grown into one of the world's largest hot pot restaurant brands.

Haidilao International Holding Ltd. is headquartered in Beijing, China, while its overseas business is operated by Super Hi International Holding Ltd., which was incorporated in the Cayman Islands in the Caribbean and headquartered in Paya Lebar, Singapore.

As of 2025, Haidilao and its overseas subsidiary operated more than 1,400 restaurants globally across mainland China, Hong Kong, Macau, and overseas markets. Super Hi International alone operated more than 110 overseas restaurants in 14 countries and regions across Asia, North America, Europe and Oceania, including Singapore, Malaysia, Thailand, Vietnam, Indonesia, Japan, South Korea, the Philippines, Cambodia, the United Arab Emirates, Australia, the United Kingdom, Canada, and the United States.

The overseas business began operations in Singapore in 2012 before being spun off into Super Hi International in 2022 and separately listed on the Hong Kong Stock Exchange.

Haidilao is widely known for its customer service, including complimentary snacks, manicure services, and live hand-pulled noodle performances at selected outlets.

== Etymology ==
In Chinese, haidilao can be translated as "deep sea fishing" or literally "scooping the sea floor". The origin of this term comes from a Chinese idiom, hǎidǐlāozhēn (海底捞针, lit. "to scoop a needle from the bottom of the sea"), a metaphor for a hopeless endeavor. This idiom was originally derived from the Buddhist poem Song of Enlightenment. The term haidilao is also used by mahjong players to refer to a rare and lucky situation when a player wins with the last tile.

== History ==
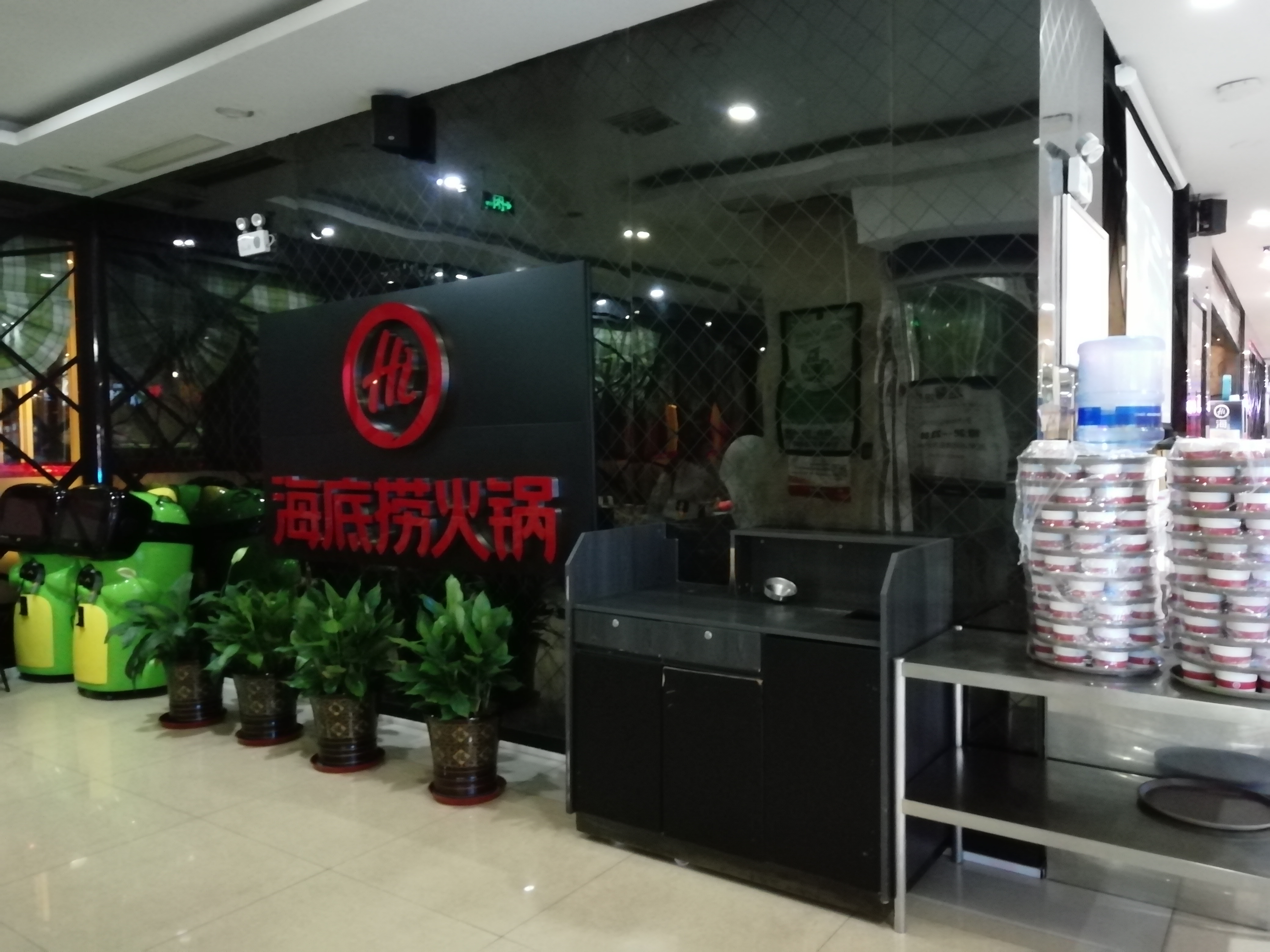
A Haidilao restaurant in Suzhou, China

In 1994, restaurateur Zhang Yong and three partners opened the first Haidilao hot pot restaurant in Jianyang, Sichuan with startup capital of 8,000 yuan. Haidilao grew competitively with an emphasis on customer service. The company expanded beyond Sichuan during the late 1990s and early 2000s, opening restaurants in other Chinese provinces including Shaanxi.

Haidilao became known for its emphasis on customer service and dining experience, helping it become one of China's largest hot pot chains.

The company opened its first overseas restaurant in Singapore at Clarke Quay in 2012. This was followed by expansion into the United States, South Korea, Japan, Canada, Australia and other international markets.

In 2018, Haidilao Hot Pot served more than 160 million customers, with an average daily table turnover rate (i.e. the number of parties hosted per table per day) of 5.0. Haidilao Hot Pot has more than 36 million VIP members and 60,000+ employees. In the same year, Haidilao raised nearly US$1 billion through an initial public offering on the Hong Kong Stock Exchange.

In 2019, Haidilao opened one of its first robot-assisted restaurants in Beijing, incorporating automation and smart kitchen systems developed in partnership with Panasonic.

In response to the COVID-19 pandemic, Haidilao closed all stores in mainland China on January 26, 2020, to decrease the spread of the virus. As a result, Haidilao recorded significant losses. A similar hotpot chain restaurant called Xiabu Xiabu also closed around 20% of its total stores as a response to the decreased consumer demand during COVID. On March 12, 2020, with cases decreasing in China, Haidilao began reopening stores.

However, even after reopening, business was slow. Haidilao also faced backlash for increasing prices to offset pandemic losses, and the number of people restaurants could serve was limited by government pandemic restrictions.

In 2021, as part of an expansion plan, Haidilao opened 421 new restaurants, but it also closed 276 in an effort to improve the operations and profitability of existing stores.

In 2022, in the wake of China's zero-COVID policy, Haidilao's shares fell more than 60%. Haidilao spun off its overseas operations into Super Hi International Holding Ltd., which later separately listed on the Hong Kong Stock Exchange.

In 2024, Super Hi International filed for a United States public listing as part of its international expansion strategy.

== Innovation and expansion ==
Haidilao and the Japanese electronics company Panasonic jointly launched a "smart" restaurant in 2018. This restaurant relies on Panasonic's robotics and image recognition technology to achieve full automation of the kitchen. After the customer orders the food with tablet computer (iPad), the system in the kitchen can automatically recognize the dishes and puts them into the tray.

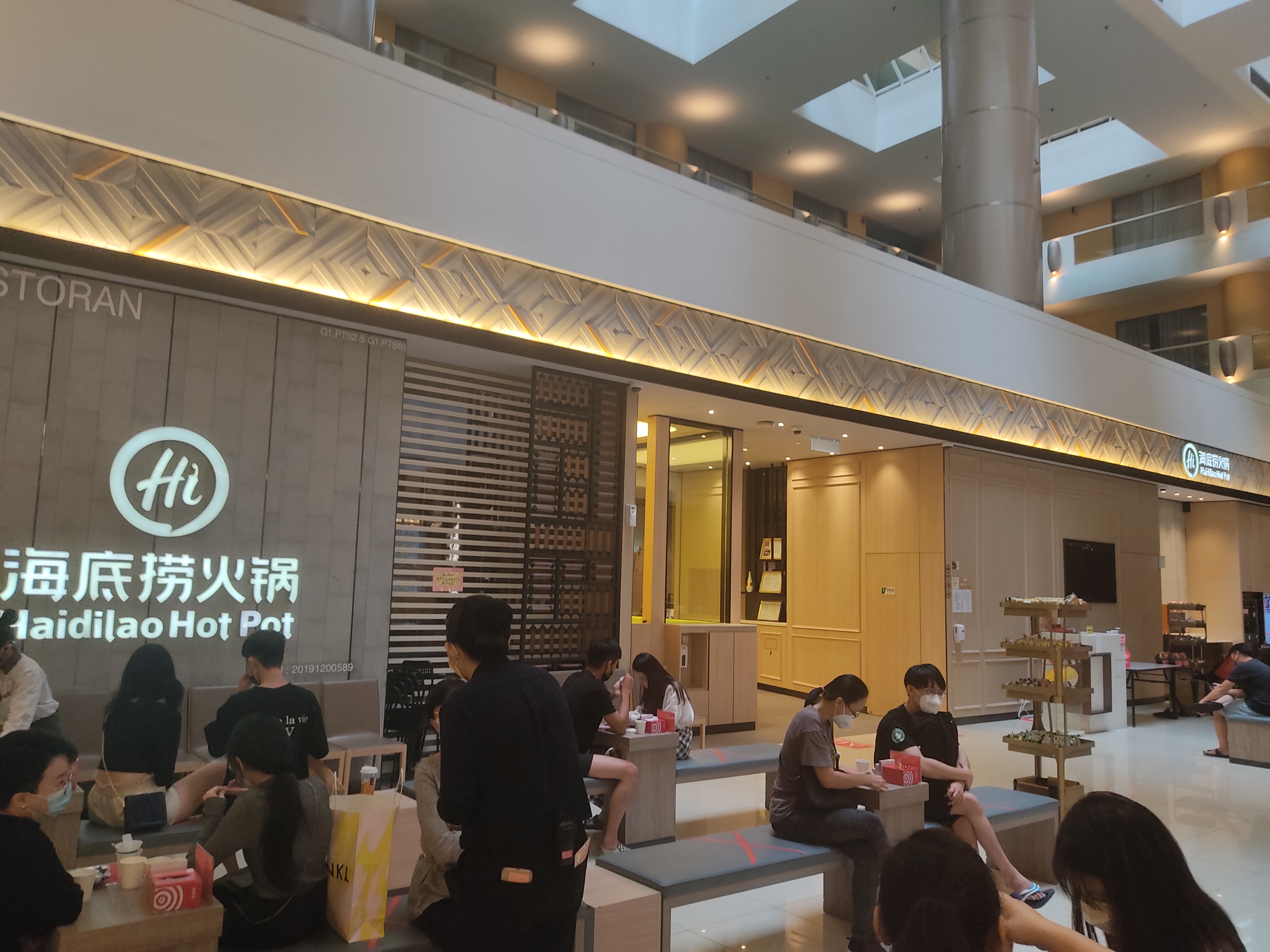
Haidilao branch in Sunway Pyramid, Malaysia

As of 2025, Haidilao and its overseas subsidiary operated more than 1,400 restaurants globally.

By the end of June 30, 2020, Haidilao Hot Pot had 935 stores in operation. In addition to the many locations in China, the company serves the areas of Hong Kong, Malaysia, Singapore, Australia, Taiwan, United Kingdom, Canada, United States, Thailand, Indonesia, Philippines, Vietnam, South Korea, Japan, and the United Arab Emirates.

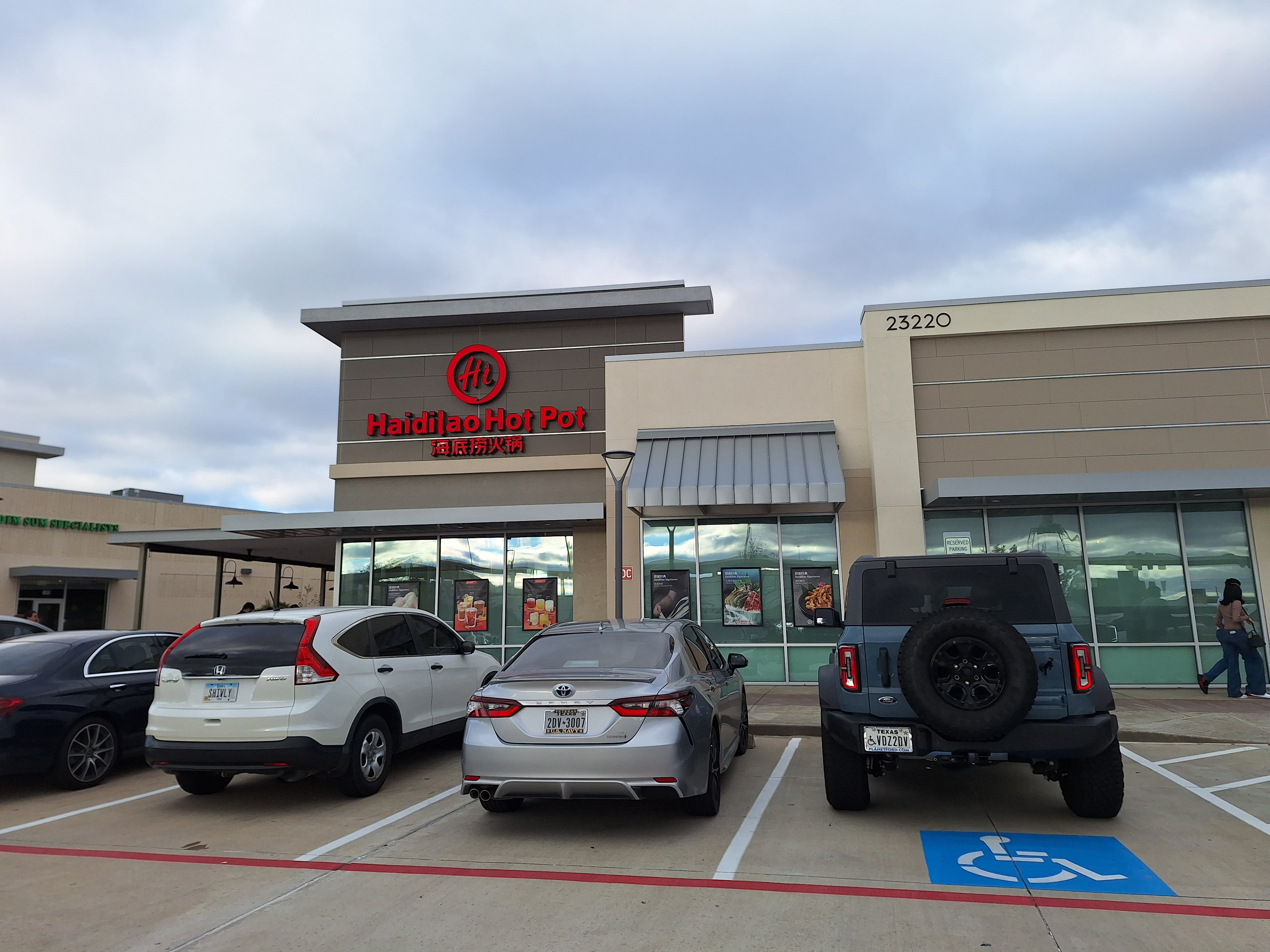
A Haidilao branch, in Houston, Texas, United States.

The company opened its first restaurant outside of mainland China in Clarke Quay, Singapore, in 2012. This was followed by its first US outlet, which opened in Westfield Santa Anita (California) in September 2013. Haidilao continued to develop its network abroad, entering the South Korean market in 2014, the Taiwanese and Japanese markets in 2015, the Hong Kong market in 2017, and the Canadian market in 2018.

In 2024, Haidilao converted some of its Jakarta, Indonesia restaurants to "No Pork, No Lard".

=== IPO ===
In 2008, Haidilao planned to increase $600 million to $700 million in the Hong Kong IPO which could increase the popularity in the global market.

In 2017, Haidilao's net profit rose 22% to 1.19 billion yuan, and revenue increased 36% to 10.64 billion yuan.

In 2018, Haidilao raised nearly US$1 billion in a Hong Kong initial public offering (IPO). The IPO figures show that even though Haidilao faced some safety issues over the past two years, investors are still feeling positive of Haidilao growth in the future.

Founded as a privately held company, Haidilao International Holding Ltd. filed to launch an initial public offering (IPO) in Hong Kong in 2018, aiming to raise up to US$700 million for further expansion.

As of 2018, Haidilao's IPO price of 17.80 Hong Kong dollars a share makes its market capitalization $12 billion.

In 2026, Haidilao International Holding Ltd.’s had a stock price drop after co-founder Shu Ping sold about $350 million worth of shares. Just months earlier, Shu’s husband, Chief Executive Officer Zhang Yong, had bought shares at prices more than 20% above where Shu Ping sold. Haidilao said that the stock sale was for personal funding needs and would have no impact on Haidilao's business.

== Operations ==
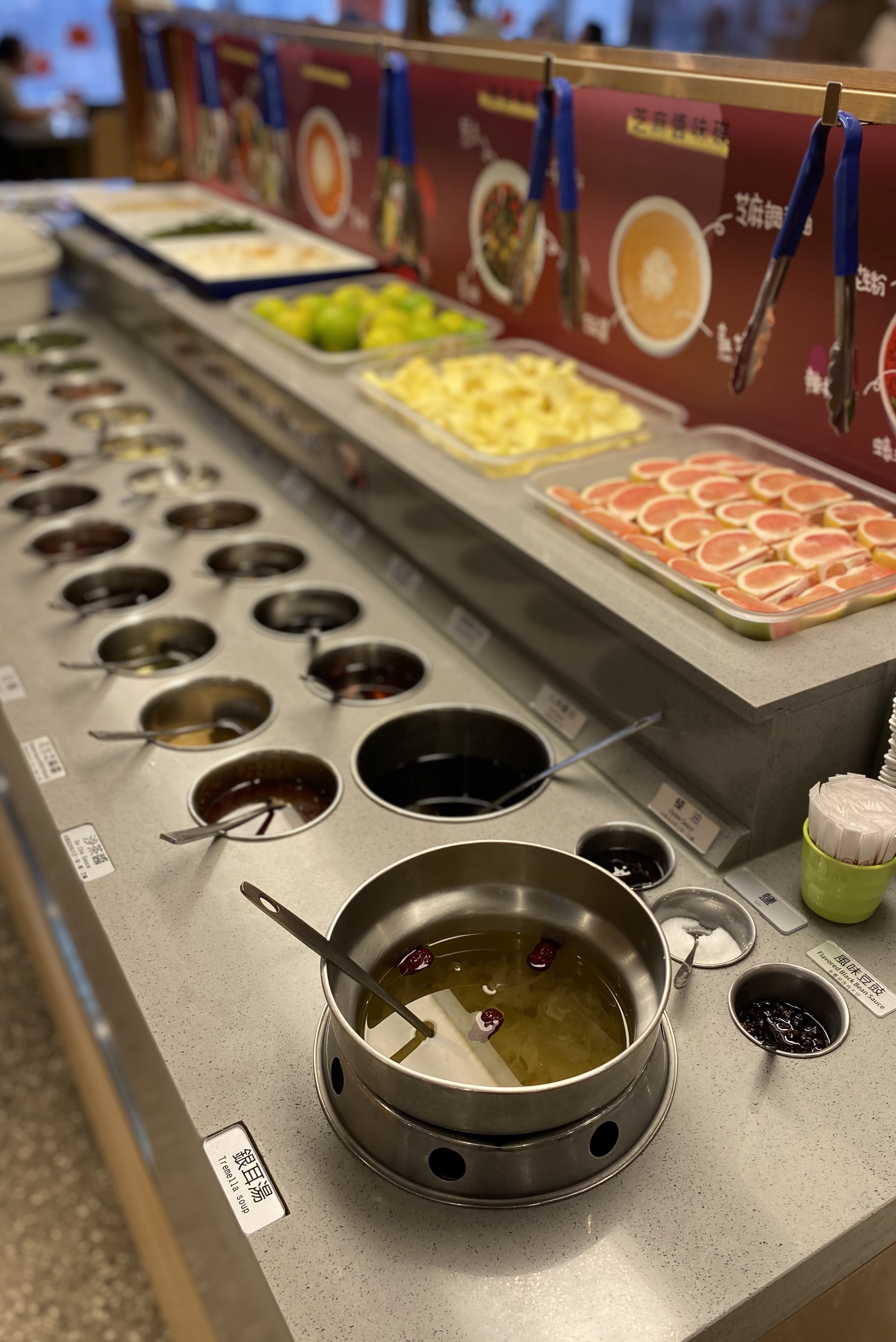
Haidilao self service sauce bar

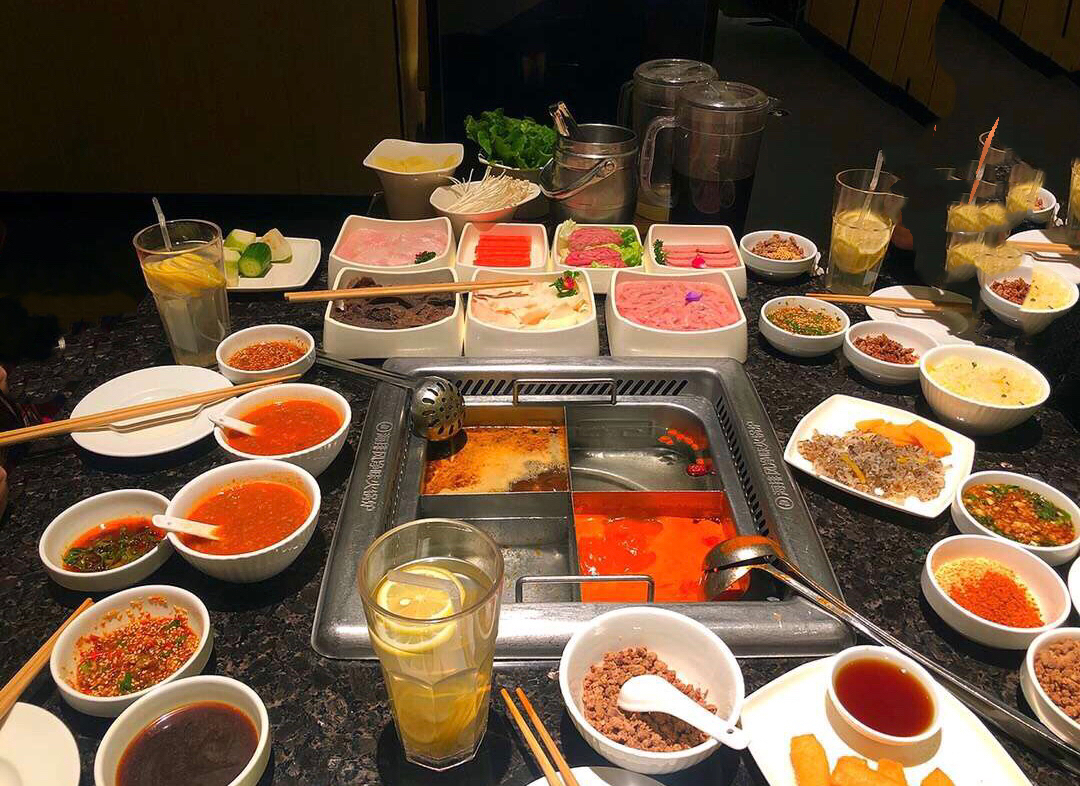
Food layout at Haidilao

Haidilao enforces strict rules when selecting food suppliers. There are more than 20 dipping sauces on Haidilao's self-service condiment table. Side dishes like peanuts, cucumbers, and fresh food are always provided. Customers can select up to four different soup bases in one pot.

== Automation ==
Haidilao restaurants have automated kitchens with robot chefs to increase efficiency and robots for food delivery.

In 2013, Haidilao developed a new video conference service where customers could see each other by using video conference facilities and remotely videoconference with customers at other Haidilao restaurants.

=== "Hi to send" service ===
Haidilao created the "Hi to send" delivery service in 2003. Once a customer orders food to be delivered, staff will send an electromagnetic pan, an induction cooker, and a wiring board to customers' home, where they will also help the customers divide their food. They wait outside until customers finish their food, after which they will take away the kitchenware. Since 2013, Haidilao is open for 24 hours a day and offers service of delivery food.

=== Amenities ===
Every Haidilao restaurant has a waiting room for customers, some of which offer additional services such as nail salons or children's play areas. Additional free before-meal services and amenities include a car wash, fruits, snacks, drinks, and board games.

During the meal, staff offer diners aprons and mobile phone bags, and provide small hairpins for long-haired customers. If customers are celebrating a birthday party or wedding ceremony at Haidilao, they get a special gift. While dining, the restaurant puts on face-changing and hand-pulled noodles performances.

Customers are given snacks, fruit, mints, and toothpicks after their meal.

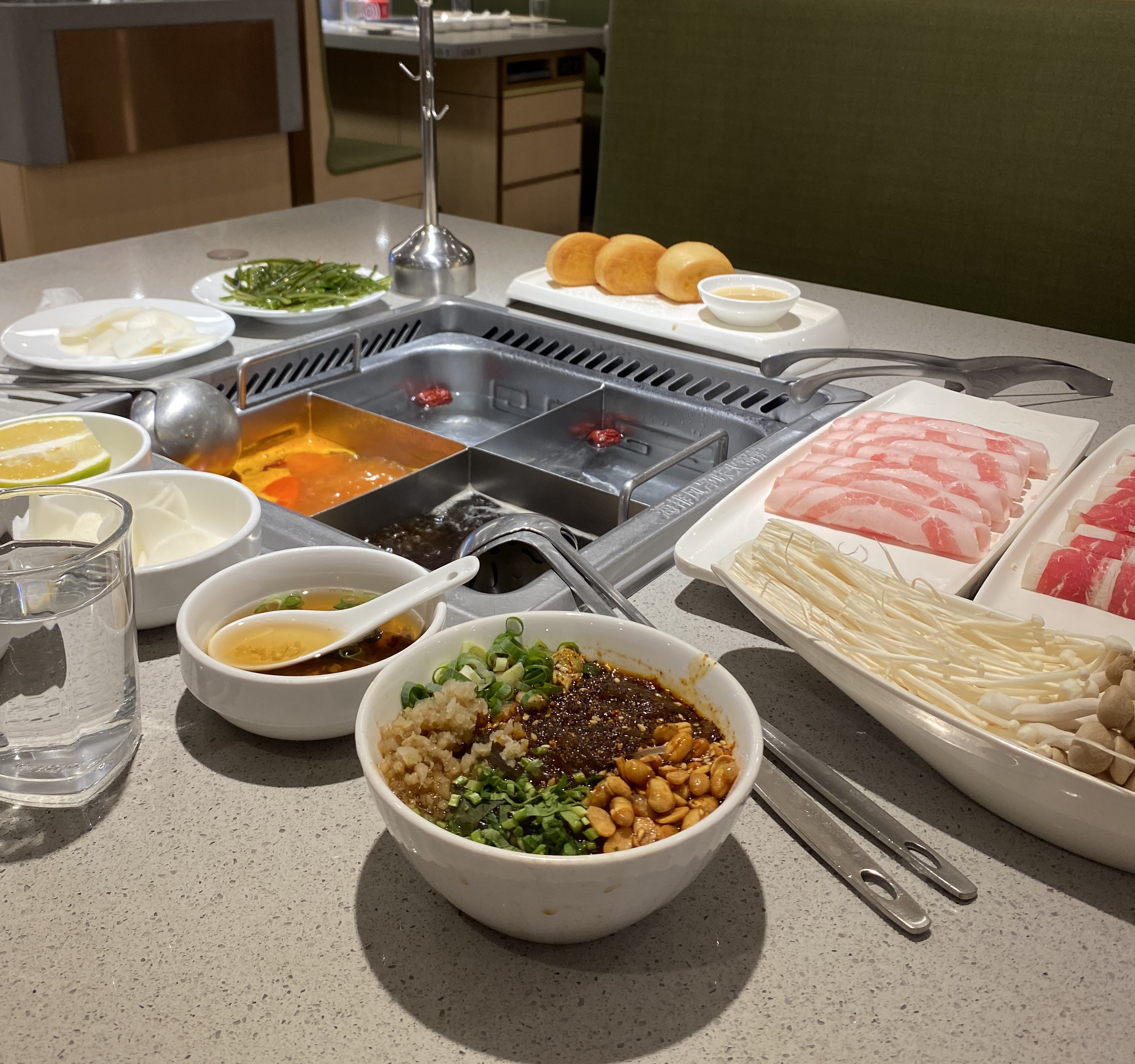
Haidilao hot pot table

== Issues ==
=== Hygiene ===
On August 25, 2017, hygiene problems were reported by the Legal Evening News. A video of a rat lying on a sink was uploaded to Weibo, a Chinese social media platform. After three and a half hours, Haidilao posted an apology letter about the hygiene issues.

Haidilao indicated that all stores needed to have a "bright kitchen", meaning that the kitchen is now visible to all customers thanks to the installment of transparent glass and opening up of the space.

The Beijing Municipal Food and Drug Administration had two meetings with the representatives of this Haidilao and required Haidilao to take rectification measures regarding their cleanliness and ensure all stores in Beijing were inspected within one month.

=== Price hikes ===
On March 12, 2020, Haidilao reopened many stores after the COVID-19 situation in mainland China improved. However, customers were shocked by the price hikes; some even stated online that they would not go back to Haidilao again. After customer complaints, a Haidilao representative stated that price increases would be limited to 6%, with each restaurant being able to define their own prices.

=== Payouts after teenagers urinate in soup ===
On February 24, 2025, two teenagers, who were reportedly drunk, urinated in the hotpot broth at one of Haidilao's Shanghai branches. Management only found out a few days later, after videos had already circulated online. All diners between February 24 and March 8 received full refunds and cash compensation equivalent to 10 times their bill amount.

== Awards and certifications ==
Haidilao has received recognition for its customer service and business performance within China's restaurant industry. In 2009, the company became a business case study at Harvard Business School for its employee management and customer service model.

From 2007 onward, Haidilao was repeatedly listed among the "Top 100 Catering Enterprises in China" by the China Cuisine Association.

In 2018, Haidilao received significant international attention following its Hong Kong Stock Exchange initial public offering, which raised nearly US$1 billion and became one of Hong Kong's largest IPOs that year.

The company has also received restaurant and service awards from regional lifestyle publications including Time Out and The Beijinger for customer service and dining experience.

== See also ==
- Chinese restaurant
- List of Chinese restaurants
- Little Sheep Group
- Sichuan cuisine
- Kemusan
