= Qingbaijiang, Chengdu =

District of Chengdu, Sichuan, China

Qingbaijiang 青白江区
- District
- District of Qingbaijiang, City of Chengdu
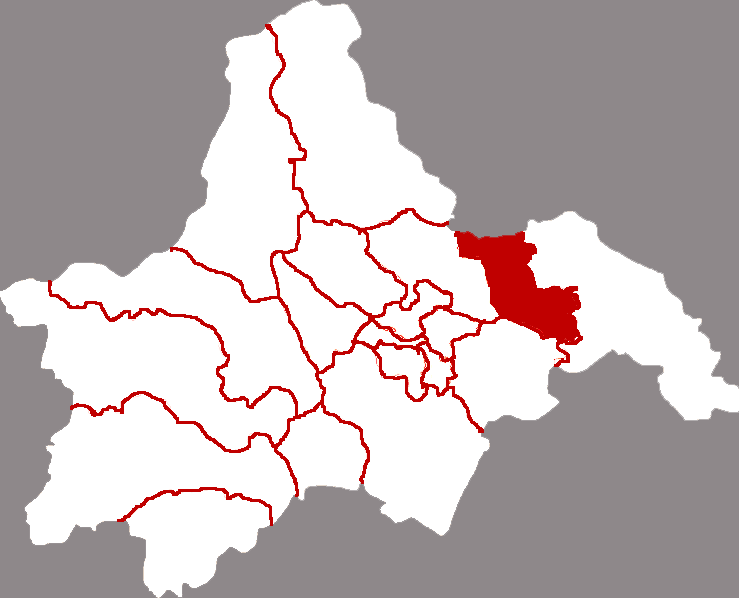
- Location of the county in Chengdu

- Location in Sichuan
- Coordinates: 30°52′06″N 104°14′33″E
- Country: China
- Province: Sichuan
- Sub-provincial city: Chengdu

Area
  - Total: 378.94 km^{2} (146.31 sq mi)

Population (2020 census)
  - Total: 490,091
  - Density: 1,293.3/km^{2} (3,349.7/sq mi)
- Time zone: UTC+8 (China Standard)
- Postal code: 6103XX

Qingbaijiang District (Chinese: 青白江区; pinyin: Qīngbáijiāng Qū; lit. 'azure–white river district') is a suburban district of the City of Chengdu, Sichuan, China. It covers parts of the city's northeastern suburbs. It borders the prefecture-level city of Deyang to the north.

== Administrative divisions ==
Qingbaijiang District administers 2 subdistricts and 5 towns:

- Dawan Subdistrict 大弯街道
- Datong Subdistrict 大同街道
- Mimou Town 弥牟镇
- Chengxiang Town 城厢镇
- Yaodu Town 姚渡镇
- Qingquan Town 清泉镇
- Fuhong Town 福洪镇

== History ==
The administrative area of Qingbaijiang District was originally Jintang County and Xindu County (now Xindu District). During the "First Five-Year Plan", the Chengdu Plain built an industrial zone in Jintang County to solve the problem of "having grain but no steel". In 1956, the State Planning Commission and the State Construction Commission decided to build the Sichuan Fertilizer Plant (now Chuanhua Group) in Jintang County. In 1958, Chengdu Steel Plant, the predecessor of Pancheng Steel, was also established here. In order to manage the two enterprises, Chengdu has split some towns and towns from Xindu and Jintang. In 1960, Qingbaijiang District was established.
