= Chinese driving test =

Official driving skill test conducted in China

Chinese driving test is an official driving skill test conducted in the People's Republic of China (excluding Hong Kong and Macau) in order to obtain legal driving motor vehicles. It is administered by the traffic administrative department of the public security organ. The contents of the examination subjects and the qualification standards have been uniformly stipulated by the Provisions on the Application for and Use of Motor Vehicle Driving Licenses formulated by the Ministry of Public Security of the People's Republic of China.

The driving test in China includes road traffic safety laws, regulations and related knowledge test subjects (also known as "theory test", referred to as "subject 1"), field driving skills test (commonly known as "stake test", referred to as "subject 2"), road driving skills test and common sense test of safe and civilized driving (commonly known as "road test", referred to as "subject 3"). The examination content and eligibility criteria are unified nationwide, and the corresponding examination items are stipulated according to different driving types.

== Test subjects ==
=== Subject 1 ===
The subject 1 (theory test) comprises 100 questions (include single-choice and true-false test) randomly selected from a pool of over 1600. Forty-five minutes will be given in which to answer all the questions and score 90 or more to pass. The question bank will not be officially published as it is the intention of the Ministry of Public Security that students must learn the traffic regulations and understand the intention of the rules rather than memorize answers to questions. After passing the test of subject 1, the learner's driving certificate will be issued as a voucher for learning subsequent subjects and taking the test.

Examination programs	Content
Road traffic safety laws, regulations and rules	Law of The People's Republic of China on Road Traffic Safety and its implementation regulations Criminal Law of the People's Republic of China; Procedures for Punishing Road Traffic Safety Violations; Provisions on the Procedures for Handling Road Traffic Accidents; Provisions on the Application for and Use of Motor Vehicle Driving Licenses; Provisions on Motor Vehicle Registration
Local regulations	Key content selected according to local regulations
Traffic signal	Road traffic lights Road traffic signs Road traffic marking Traffic police gesture
Basic knowledge of safe driving and civilized driving	Driving behavior Traffic safety violations
Basic knowledge of motor vehicle driving and operation	Instrument and indicator Control equipment Safety equipment

=== Subject 2 ===
In subject 2 (stake test), learners driving vehicles to complete multiple project assessments in an open field. Since medium and large passenger cars and trucks are more dangerous than small passenger cars, and require higher technical requirements for drivers, there are more test items for subject 2 of these types. Learners of large buses, tractors, city buses, medium-sized buses and large goods vehicles should score 90 or more, and the learners of other vehicle types should score 80 or more to pass subject 2.

Examination programs	Vehicle types															
Examination programs	A1	A2	A3	B1	B2	C1	C2	C3	C4	C5	D	E	F	M	N	P
Reverse parking						✓	✓	✓		✓						
Ramp stop and start	✓	✓	✓	✓	✓	✓	✓	✓	✓	✓	✓	✓	✓			
Parallel parking	✓	✓	✓	✓	✓	✓	✓	✓		✓						
Pass unilateral bridge	✓	✓	✓	✓	✓				✓	✓	✓	✓	✓			
Curve driving	✓	✓	✓	✓	✓	✓	✓	✓		✓						
Right angle turn	✓	✓	✓	✓	✓	✓	✓	✓		✓						
Pass the width limiting gate	✓	✓	✓	✓	✓											
Pass continuous obstacles	✓	✓	✓	✓	✓											
Rough road driving	✓	✓	✓	✓	✓											
Narrow road turn	✓	✓	✓	✓	✓											
Simulate highway driving	✓	✓	✓	✓	✓											
Simulate continuous sharp bend mountain road driving	✓	✓	✓	✓	✓											
Simulate tunnel driving	✓	✓	✓	✓	✓											
Simulate rainy and foggy day driving	✓	✓	✓	✓	✓											
Simulate slippery road driving	✓	✓	✓	✓	✓											
Emergency handling	✓	✓	✓	✓	✓											
Examination content added by the traffic management department of provincial public security organs	✓	✓	✓	✓	✓	✓	✓	✓		✓				✓	✓	✓

Notes

A1: Large buses
A2: Tractors
A3: City buses
B1: Medium-sized buses
B2: Large goods vehicles
C1: Small vehicles
C2: Small automatic shift vehicles
C3: Low-speed goods vehicles
C4: Three-wheelers
C5: Small automatic shift passenger vehicles for disabilities
D: Common three-wheel motorcycles
E: Common two-wheel motorcycles
F: Light motorcycles
M: Wheeled self-move mechanical vehicles
N: Trolley buses
P: Tramcars

=== Subject 3 ===
==== Road driving skills test ====
In road driving skills test, learners need to drive along a fixed route on actual roads and complete the assessment of corresponding items in accordance with regulations. Each test car will be equipped with a safety officer to assess the learner's driving performance.

Vehicle types	Length limit of the routes for testing
A1, B1	20 km or more (10 km or more during the day, 5 km or more at night)
A2, A3, B2	10 km or more (5 km or more during the day, 3 km or more at night)
C1, C2, C3, C5	3 km or more (Select no less than 20% of the learners for the night exam)

Vehicle types	Examination content
A1, A2, A3, B1, B2, C1, C2, C3, C5	Get on the vehicle and prepare for driving
A1, A2, A3, B1, B2, C1, C2, C3, C5	Simulate night lighting test (during the day)
A1, A2, A3, B1, B2, C1, C2, C3, C5	Get start
A1, A2, A3, B1, B2, C1, C2, C3, C5	Drive straight
A1, A2, A3, B1, B2, C1, C2, C3, C5	Plus and minus gear (manual transmission vehicle only)
A1, A2, A3, B1, B2, C1, C2, C3, C5	Change lane
A1, A2, A3, B1, B2, C1, C2, C3, C5	Pull over
A1, A2, A3, B1, B2, C1, C2, C3, C5	Go straight through the intersection
A1, A2, A3, B1, B2, C1, C2, C3, C5	Turn left at the intersection
A1, A2, A3, B1, B2, C1, C2, C3, C5	Turn right at the intersection
A1, A2, A3, B1, B2, C1, C2, C3, C5	Pass the crosswalk
A1, A2, A3, B1, B2, C1, C2, C3, C5	Through the school area
A1, A2, A3, B1, B2, C1, C2, C3, C5	Pass the bus stop
A1, A2, A3, B1, B2, C1, C2, C3, C5	Cross each other
A1, A2, A3, B1, B2, C1, C2, C3, C5	Overtake
A1, A2, A3, B1, B2, C1, C2, C3, C5	Turn around
A1, A2, A3, B1, B2, C1, C2, C3, C5	Driving at night (only A, B and selected C learners)
Other types	Determined by the traffic management department of the provincial public security organ

==== Common sense test of safe and civilized driving ====
Common sense test of safe and civilized driving, is the theory part of subject 3, commonly known as subject 4 (which has never been used as an official name). The test format of subject 4 is similar to subject 1. There are 50 questions including single-choice questions, multiple-choice questions and true-false questions. Each question is 2 points, and score 90 to pass.

Examination programs
Safe and civilized driving and operation requirements
Safe driving knowledge under bad weather and complex road conditions
Emergency handling methods
Disposal knowledge after traffic accident

After the learner has completed and passed the assessment of all four subjects, a motor vehicle driver's license will be obtained.
