= Jintang County =

Jintang County 金堂县 Kin-tang
- County
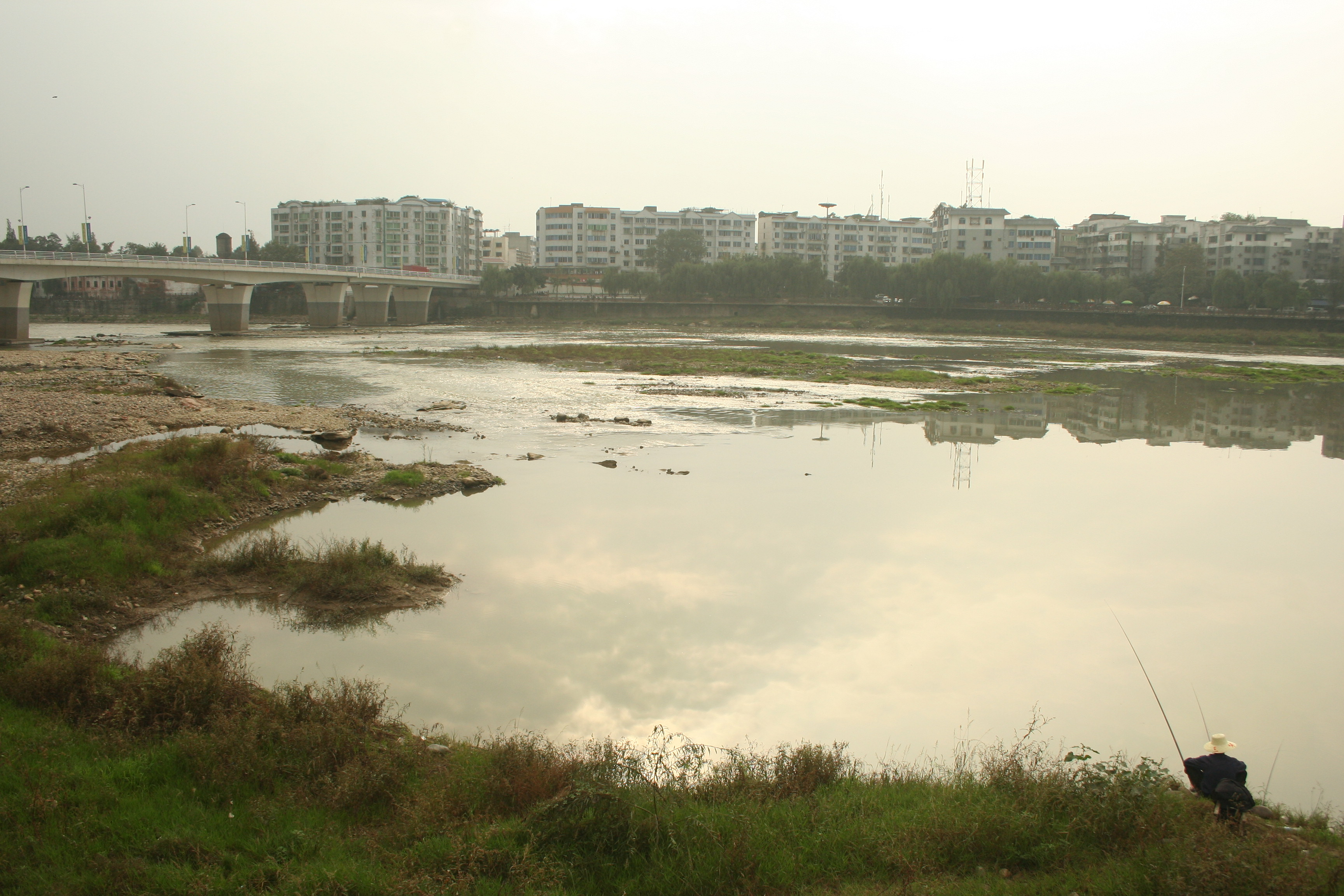

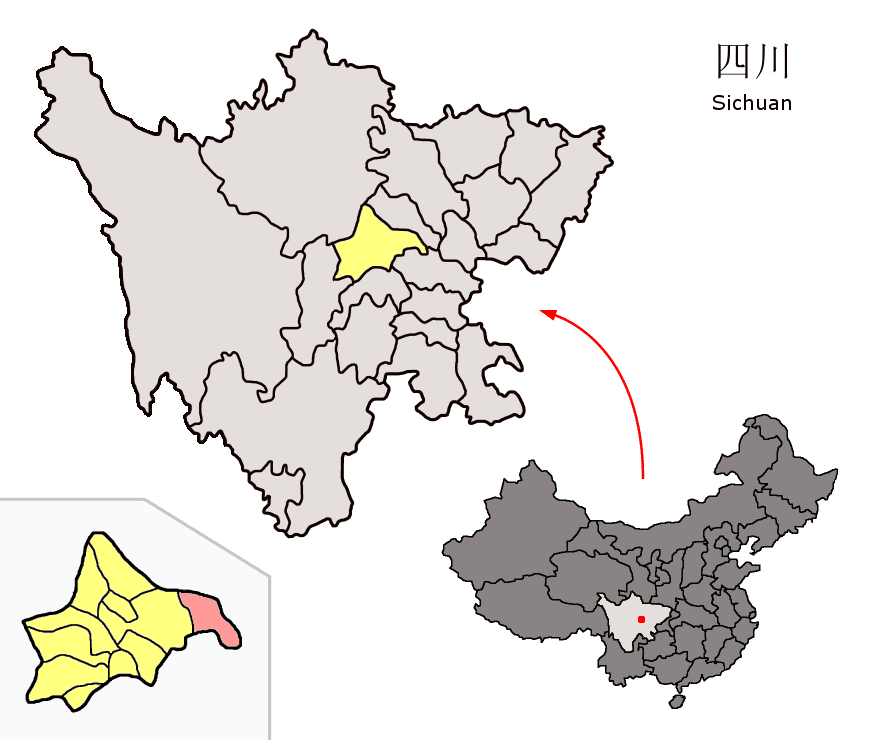
- Location of Jintang County in Sichuan

- Location of the seat in Sichuan
- Coordinates: 30°51′04″N 104°24′58″E
- Country: China
- Province: Sichuan
- Sub-provincial city: Chengdu
- County seat: Zhaozhen Subdistrict

Area
  - Total: 1,156 km^{2} (446 sq mi)

Population (2020 census)
  - Total: 800,371
  - Density: 620/km^{2} (1,600/sq mi)
- Time zone: UTC+8 (China Standard)
- Postal code: 6104XX
- Area code: 028
- Website: jintang.gov.cn

Jintang County
- Traditional Chinese: 金堂縣
- Simplified Chinese: 金堂县
- Literal meaning: Golden Hall County
Transcriptions
Standard Mandarin
- Hanyu Pinyin: Jīntáng Xiàn

Jintang County (Note: Also formerly romanized as Kin-tang Heen.) is a county of the City of Chengdu, capital of Sichuan, China.

== Geography ==
Jintang is bordered by the prefecture-level city of Deyang to the north and east and the county-level city of Jianyang to the south.

== History ==
In the 19th century, Jintang County was regarded as producing the best tobacco in Sichuan after nearby Pidu District.

== Administrative divisions ==
Jintang is subdivided in 6 subdistricts and 10 towns:

Subdistricts

- Zhaodao subdistrict (赵镇街道)
- Guancang subdistrict (官仓街道)
- Qixian subdistrict (栖贤街道)
- Gaoban subdistrict (高板街道)
- Baiguo subdistrict (白果街道)
- Huaikou subdistrict (淮口街道)

Towns

- Wufeng (五凤镇)
- Sanxi (三溪镇)
- Fuxing (福兴镇)
- Jinlong (金龙镇)
- Zhaojia (赵家镇)
- Zhugao (竹篙镇)
- Zhuanlong (转龙镇)
- Tuqiao (土桥镇)
- Yunhe (云合镇)
- Youxin (又新镇)

== Climate ==
Climate data for Jintang, elevation 494 m (1,621 ft), (1991–2020 normals, extremes 1981–present)
Month	Jan	Feb	Mar	Apr	May	Jun	Jul	Aug	Sep	Oct	Nov	Dec	Year
Record high °C (°F)	20.1 (68.2)	23.6 (74.5)	32.8 (91.0)	33.4 (92.1)	37.1 (98.8)	36.7 (98.1)	41.0 (105.8)	41.6 (106.9)	36.8 (98.2)	30.6 (87.1)	26.1 (79.0)	19.0 (66.2)	41.6 (106.9)
Mean daily maximum °C (°F)	10.0 (50.0)	13.0 (55.4)	17.9 (64.2)	23.8 (74.8)	27.6 (81.7)	29.5 (85.1)	31.1 (88.0)	31.0 (87.8)	26.5 (79.7)	21.6 (70.9)	16.9 (62.4)	11.4 (52.5)	21.7 (71.0)
Daily mean °C (°F)	6.3 (43.3)	8.9 (48.0)	13.2 (55.8)	18.4 (65.1)	22.4 (72.3)	24.8 (76.6)	26.5 (79.7)	26.1 (79.0)	22.3 (72.1)	17.7 (63.9)	12.9 (55.2)	7.7 (45.9)	17.3 (63.1)
Mean daily minimum °C (°F)	3.6 (38.5)	6.0 (42.8)	9.8 (49.6)	14.4 (57.9)	18.4 (65.1)	21.3 (70.3)	23.1 (73.6)	22.7 (72.9)	19.6 (67.3)	15.3 (59.5)	10.4 (50.7)	5.2 (41.4)	14.2 (57.5)
Record low °C (°F)	−4.4 (24.1)	−2.1 (28.2)	−1.6 (29.1)	4.6 (40.3)	7.2 (45.0)	14.2 (57.6)	17.1 (62.8)	16.3 (61.3)	12.9 (55.2)	3.2 (37.8)	0.6 (33.1)	−4.3 (24.3)	−4.4 (24.1)
Average precipitation mm (inches)	6.8 (0.27)	8.7 (0.34)	18.7 (0.74)	40.6 (1.60)	65.2 (2.57)	111.9 (4.41)	185.4 (7.30)	180.5 (7.11)	114.3 (4.50)	39.4 (1.55)	9.9 (0.39)	4.7 (0.19)	786.1 (30.97)
Average precipitation days (≥ 0.1 mm)	6.5	6.1	8.5	10.4	12.6	14.6	15.3	13.1	13.7	12.2	5.8	4.3	123.1
Average snowy days	1.0	0.3	0	0	0	0	0	0	0	0	0.1	0.3	1.7
Average relative humidity (%)	79	75	72	70	68	75	81	81	82	82	80	79	77
Mean monthly sunshine hours	58.9	66.4	105.1	135	143	125.1	143.3	157.2	94.3	70.8	66.2	54.8	1,220.1
Percentage possible sunshine	18	21	28	35	34	30	33	39	26	20	21	17	27
Source: China Meteorological Administrationall-time extreme temperatureall-time July high
