= Luodai =

Historic town in Sichuan, China

Coordinates: 30°38′30″N 104°19′30″E

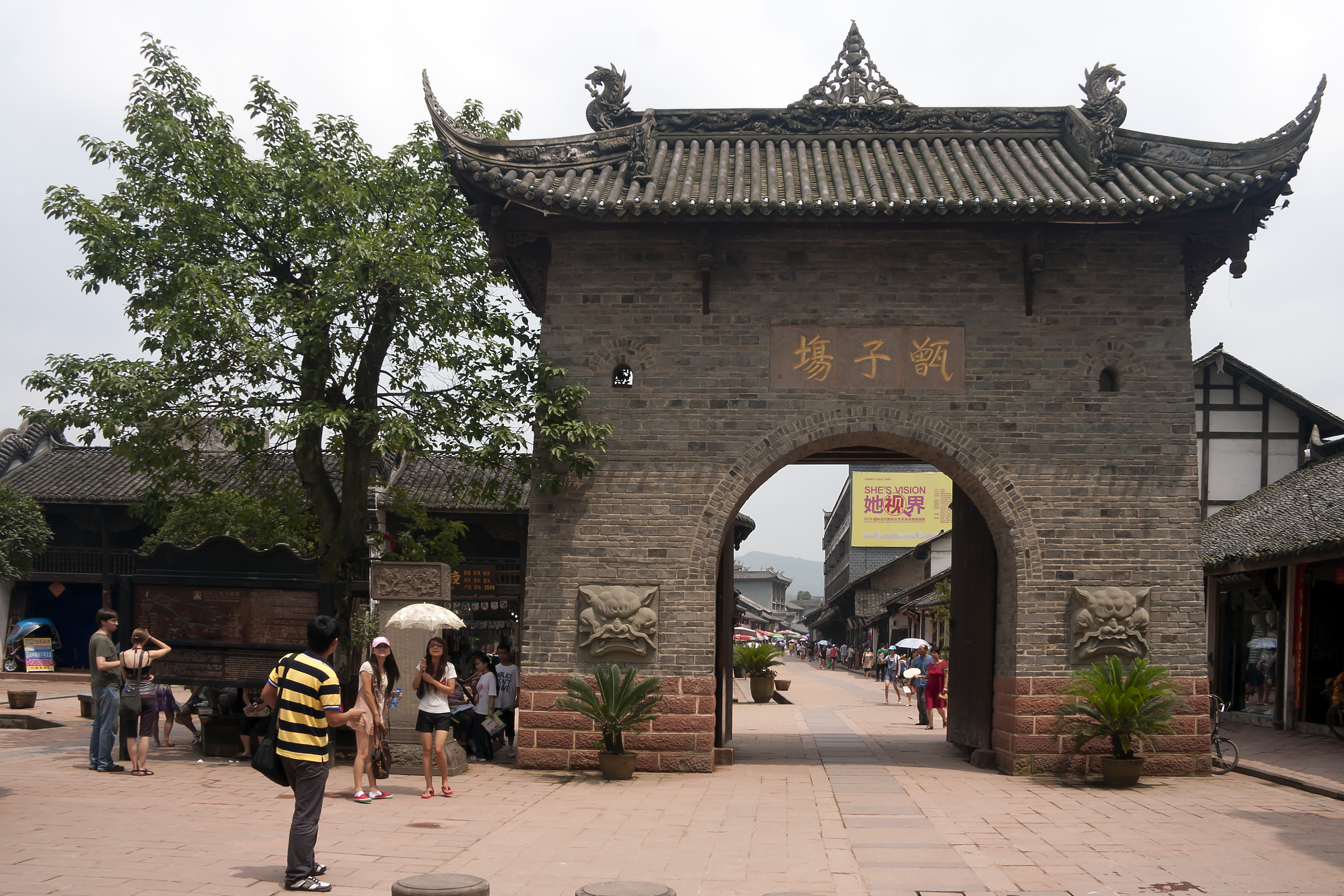
Western gate of Luodai ancient town

Luodai is an ancient town in the Sichuan province in southwest China. It is located about 20 km from downtown Chengdu. It has about 23,000 inhabitants, of which about 20,000 are Hakka people.

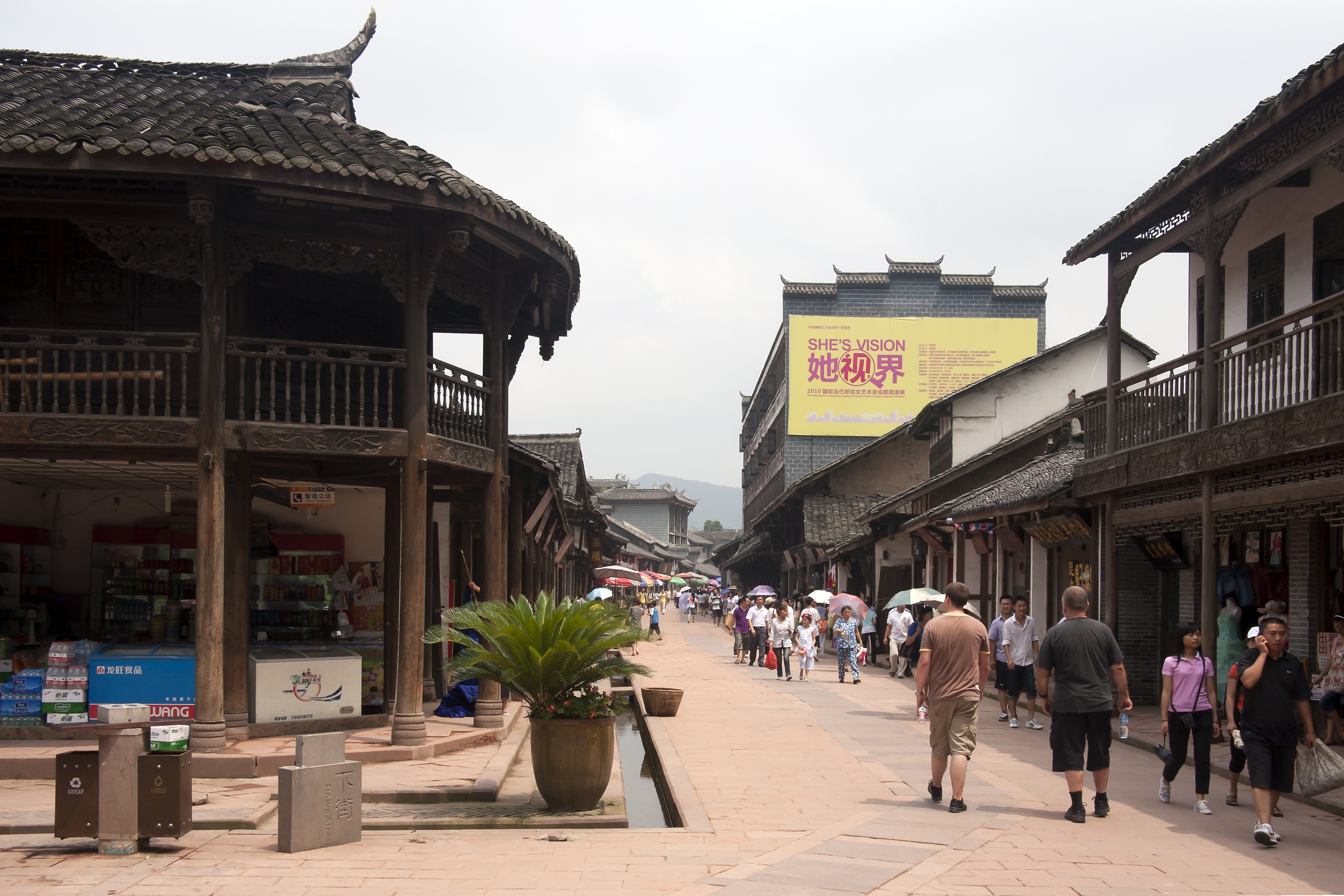
Main street of Luodai ancient town

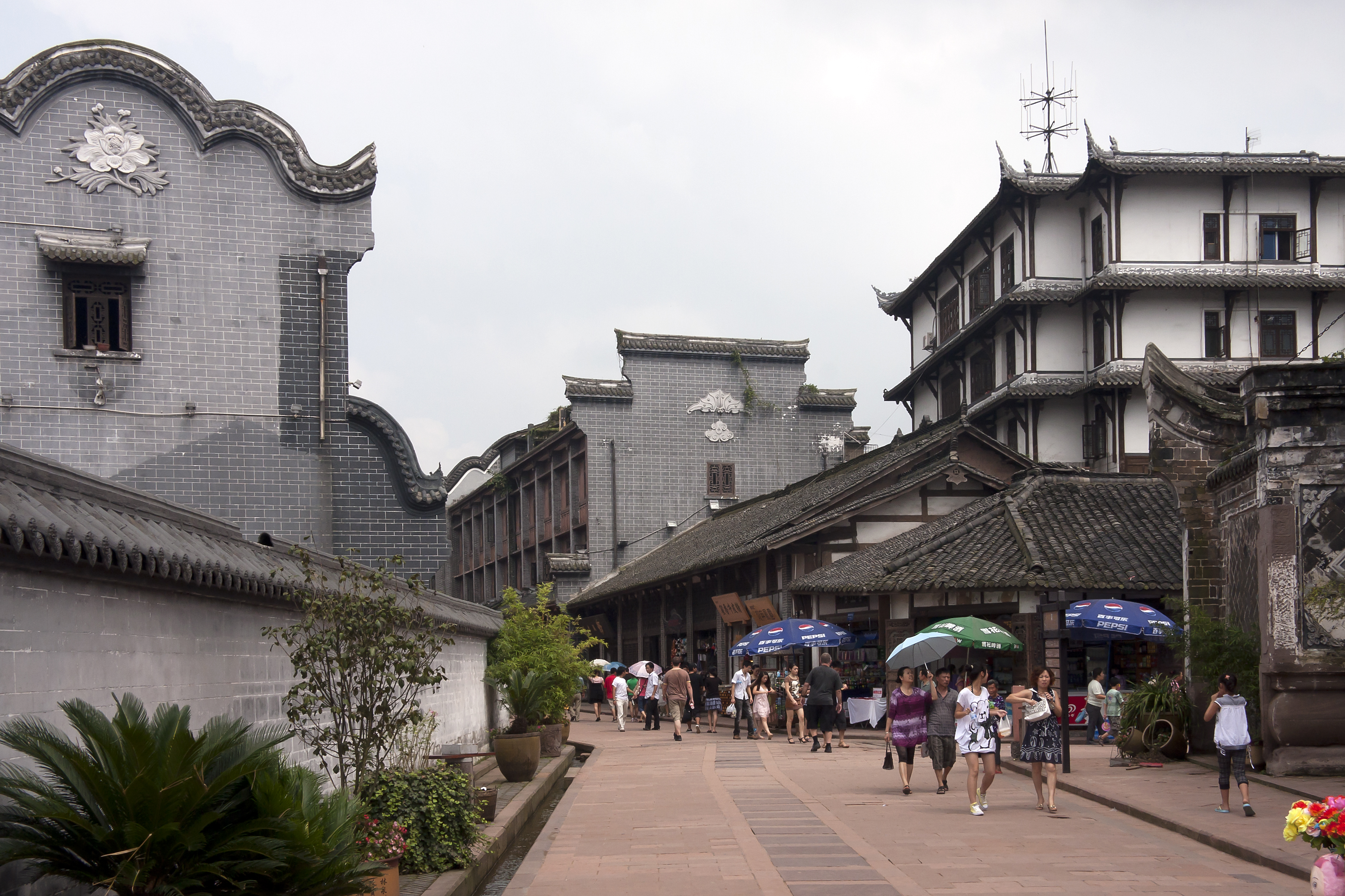
Main street of Luodai ancient town

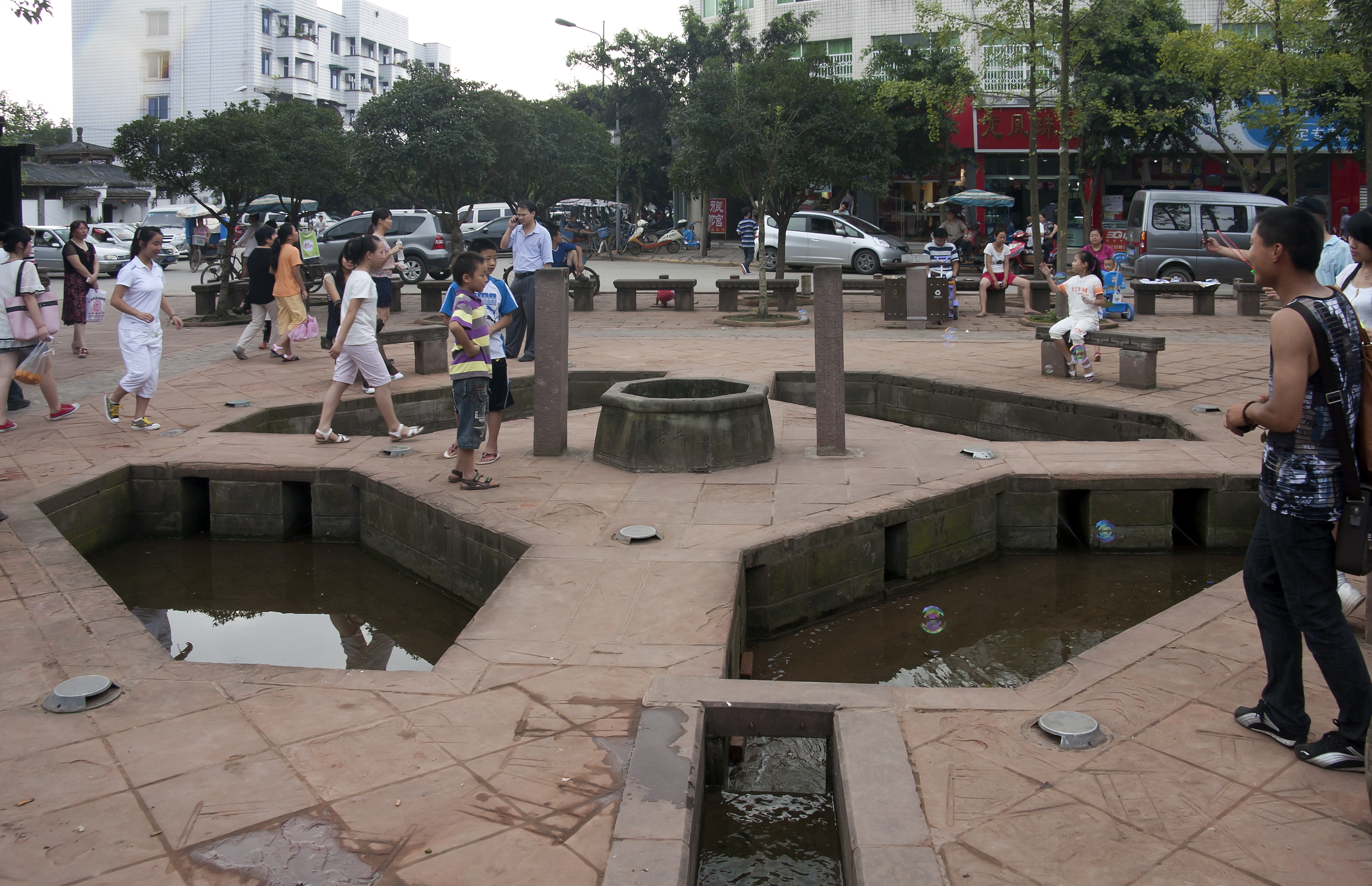
The legendary well of Luodai ancient town

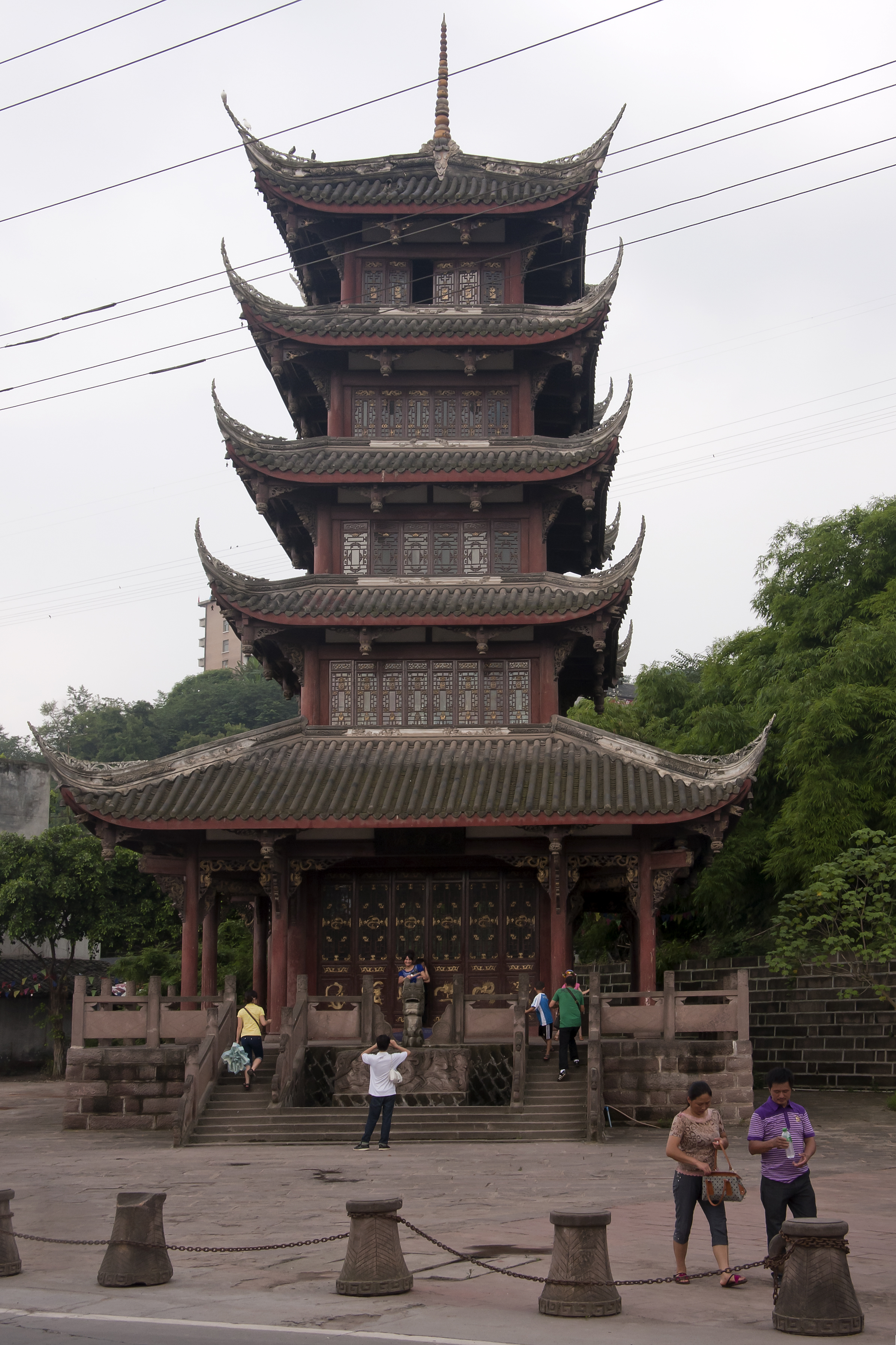
Pagoda

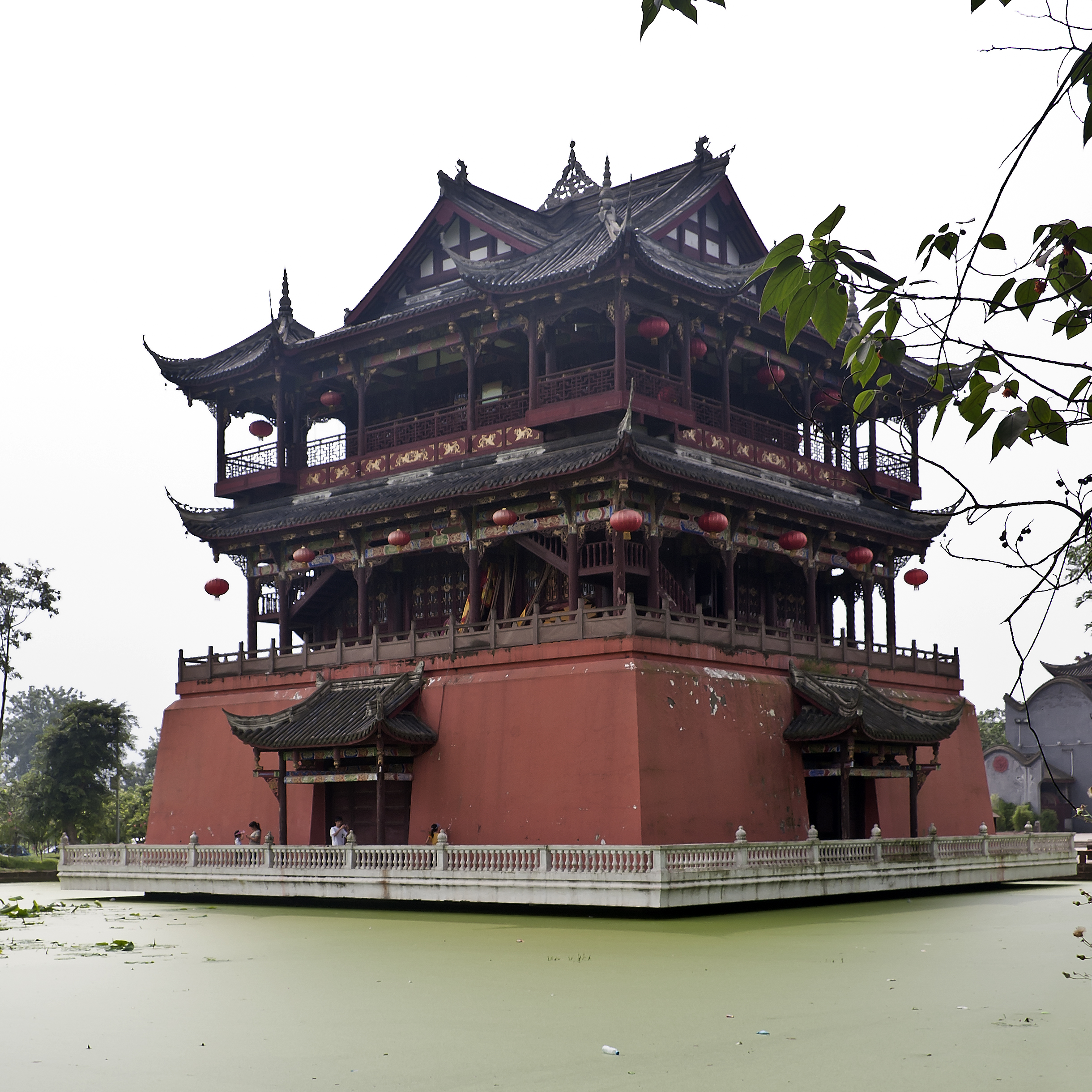
Five Phoenix building

As more than 85% of the population of the town is Hakkas, the town is the typical representative of Hakka community in Sichuan Province. For this reason, it is also called “World’s Luodai and Eternal Hakka”. As one of the core branch venues for the 20th World's Hakka Conference, Luodai has its position been established in the Hakka culture of the world. During the weekends, many tourists visit to experience the unique cultural atmosphere while tasting local dishes and snacks.
