= Jianyang, Sichuan =

Jianyang 简阳市
- County-level city
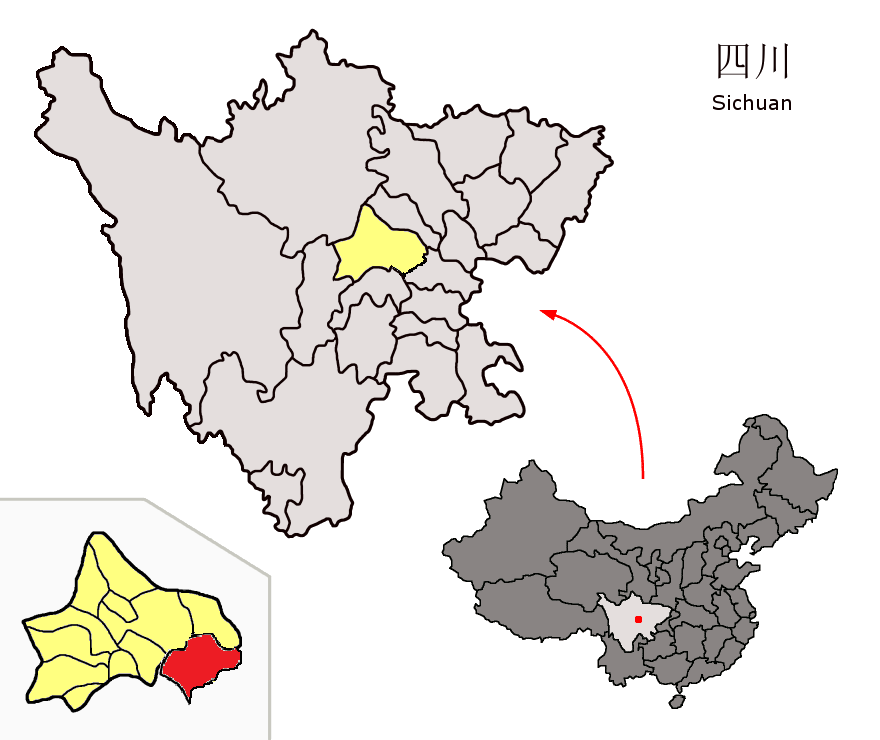
- Location of Jianyang City (red) within Chengdu City (yellow) and Sichuan

- Location in Sichuan
- Coordinates (dm): 30°22′48″N 104°31′48″E
- Country: China
- Province: Sichuan
- Sub-provincial city: Chengdu
- Municipal seat: Shehongba Subdistrict

Area
  - Total: 2,215 km^{2} (855 sq mi)

Population (2020 census)
  - Total: 1,117,265
  - Density: 504.4/km^{2} (1,306/sq mi)
- Time zone: UTC+8 (China Standard)
- Postal code: 641400
- Area code: 028
- Website: www.scjy.gov.cn

Jianyang (simplified Chinese: 简阳; traditional Chinese: 簡陽; pinyin: Jiǎnyáng) is a county-level city under the administration of the prefecture-level city of Chengdu, in Sichuan Province, Southwest China. Situated only 48 kilometers (30 mi) from Chengdu CBD, Jianyang is administratively under the jurisdiction of Chengdu, changed from being a prefecture-level city of Ziyang since May 2016. The preparation work for changing it to "Jianyang District"has started as of August 2019. The urban center is located on the banks of the Tuo River.

== History ==
Jianyang has a recorded history dating back over two thousand years. It was part of the state of Shu until the third century BC and was incorporated into the Qin Empire following the unification of China under Qin Shihuang.

In the Yuan dynasty, it was named Jianzhou (簡州); its current name was adopted in 1913 during the Republic of China. After the foundation of the People's Republic of China, it was incorporated into the Neijiang Administration Zone. It was divided into communes during the Cultural Revolution. When the communes were abolished, it was subsumed by Chengdu. In 1994, the county was converted into a county-level city. In 2007, the county was given broad autonomy over its budgeting and financial affairs by the State Council as part of a wider experiment. In 2016, the State Council transferred jurisdiction of Jianyang from Ziyang to Chengdu, ostensibly to increase urban integration with the provincial capital.

== Administration ==
Jianyang was administered by the prefecture-level city of Ziyang up until 2016 when it was transferred to Chengdu prefecture due to Jianyang's economic integration as a part of the greater Chengdu metropolitan area. Jianyang is home to commuters who work in Chengdu.

Administratively, Jianyang is subdivided into 16 subdistricts and 21 towns:

Subdistricts

- Jiancheng 简城街道
- Shehongba 射洪坝街道
- Xinshi 新市街道
- Dongxi 东溪街道
- Pingquan 平泉街道
- Shiqiao 石桥街道
- Chishui 赤水街道
- Shipan 石盘街道
- Yangma 养马街道
- Jiajia 贾家街道
- Shibandeng 石板凳街道
- Sancha 三岔街道
- Caochi 草池街道
- Futian 福田街道
- Yucheng 玉成街道
- Danjing 丹景街道

Towns

- Yangjia 杨家镇
- Hefeng 禾丰镇
- Yunlong 云龙镇
- Sanxing 三星镇
- Zhenjin 镇金镇
- Shizhong 石钟镇
- Shijia 施家镇
- Sanhe 三合镇
- Pingwu 平武镇
- Tashui 踏水镇
- Jiangyuan 江源镇
- Yongquan 涌泉镇
- Lujia 芦葭镇
- Qinglong 青龙镇
- Gaoming 高明镇
- Wumiao 武庙镇
- Zhuangxi 壮溪镇
- Hongyuan 宏缘镇
- Leijia 雷家镇
- Dongjiageng 董家埂镇
- Hailuo 海螺镇

== Demographics ==
As of 2012, there are just over 1.48 million residents estimated to be living in Jianyang. Of these, the vast majority (some 1.21 million) are rural residents. The natural population growth rate without taking into account net migration figures is 1.19% as of 2012. Over 99% of the population is of Han ethnicity. There are small Yi, Tujia, and Tibetan populations, each numbering no more than a few hundred.

== Climate ==
Climate data for Jianyang, elevation 449 m (1,473 ft), (1991–2020 normals, extremes 1991–present)
Month	Jan	Feb	Mar	Apr	May	Jun	Jul	Aug	Sep	Oct	Nov	Dec	Year
Record high °C (°F)	19.7 (67.5)	23.3 (73.9)	33.1 (91.6)	36.2 (97.2)	39.5 (103.1)	37.5 (99.5)	41.7 (107.1)	43.4 (110.1)	37.7 (99.9)	32.0 (89.6)	25.7 (78.3)	19.2 (66.6)	43.4 (110.1)
Mean daily maximum °C (°F)	9.8 (49.6)	13.0 (55.4)	18.1 (64.6)	23.9 (75.0)	27.8 (82.0)	29.5 (85.1)	31.3 (88.3)	31.2 (88.2)	26.5 (79.7)	21.3 (70.3)	16.8 (62.2)	11.2 (52.2)	21.7 (71.1)
Daily mean °C (°F)	6.6 (43.9)	9.2 (48.6)	13.5 (56.3)	18.6 (65.5)	22.4 (72.3)	24.7 (76.5)	26.7 (80.1)	26.4 (79.5)	22.4 (72.3)	17.7 (63.9)	13.2 (55.8)	8.1 (46.6)	17.5 (63.4)
Mean daily minimum °C (°F)	4.2 (39.6)	6.5 (43.7)	10.3 (50.5)	14.8 (58.6)	18.5 (65.3)	21.3 (70.3)	23.4 (74.1)	23.0 (73.4)	19.7 (67.5)	15.4 (59.7)	10.8 (51.4)	5.8 (42.4)	14.5 (58.0)
Record low °C (°F)	−3.1 (26.4)	−1.3 (29.7)	1.9 (35.4)	5.0 (41.0)	8.6 (47.5)	14.4 (57.9)	18.2 (64.8)	15.9 (60.6)	13.1 (55.6)	8.3 (46.9)	1.8 (35.2)	−2.8 (27.0)	−3.1 (26.4)
Average precipitation mm (inches)	9.0 (0.35)	12.9 (0.51)	22.7 (0.89)	43.1 (1.70)	68.5 (2.70)	132.9 (5.23)	168.4 (6.63)	178.5 (7.03)	103.4 (4.07)	38.7 (1.52)	13.5 (0.53)	7.5 (0.30)	799.1 (31.46)
Average precipitation days (≥ 0.1 mm)	6.8	6.7	9.3	11.5	12.3	14.8	14.3	12.6	13.6	12.7	6.4	5.4	126.4
Average snowy days	1.1	0.3	0	0	0	0	0	0	0	0	0	0.3	1.7
Average relative humidity (%)	79	76	72	71	68	77	81	79	82	83	79	79	77
Mean monthly sunshine hours	54.8	71.6	110.5	150.9	155.0	137.0	167.9	181.6	104.5	74.0	71.6	52.3	1,331.7
Percentage possible sunshine	17	23	30	39	36	32	39	45	29	21	23	17	29
Source: China Meteorological Administrationall-time extreme temperatureall-time July high

== Transportation ==
Development of local transport advanced rapidly between 1990 and 2010. Jianyang is served by numerous local freeways, including an expressway that connects it to Chengdu, the Chengdu-Chongqing Expressway, and the Second Ring Expressway of Chengdu, in addition to China National Highways 318, 319, and 321.

Jianyang Railway Station serves the city. Jianyang South Railway Station is a high-speed rail station on the Chengdu–Chongqing Intercity Railway.

Chengdu Tianfu International Airport, intended to be a new hub servicing southwestern China, is in operation.

== Economy ==
The local economy is mainly dependent on agriculture and the production of machinery. There are factories in the region producing metal tools, tractors, and knives. Ruonan Foods headquarters is located in Jianyang. As of 2013 recorded a GDP of 34.48 billion yuan.

The Sichuan Provincial Women's Prison is located in the town of Yangma (养马镇), in Jianyang city limits.

Haidilao hot pot restaurant chain was founded in Jianyang but the headquarters has since moved to Beijing.
