= Jinan (disambiguation) =

Jinan (济南市; Ji-n'an; Tsi-n'an; Chi-n'an) is the capital of Shandong province, China.

Jinan or Jin'an or Ji-Nan or variant, may also refer to:

== Places ==
- Jinan County (鎭安郡), North Jeolla Province, South Korea
- Jinan, Iran, a village in South Khorasan Province, Iran
- Jinan or Jihnan, a former transliteration of Rinan (日南; Vietnamese: Nhat Nam), a former prefecture of the Han dynasty (Chinese) province of Jiaozhi in modern Vietnam

=== In China ===
- Jinan Military Region (济南军区), formerly covering Shandong and Henan, disbanded in 2016 reforms
- Jinan University (暨南大学), in Guangzhou, Guangdong
- Jinan Commandery (濟南郡), historical commandery of China

==== Districts ====
- Jin'an District, Fuzhou (晋安区), Fujian
- Jin'an District, Lu'an (金安区), Anhui

==== Towns ====
- Jin'an Town, Sichuan (进安镇), subdivision of Songpan County, Sichuan
- Jin'an, Yunnan (zh; 金安镇), town in and subdivision of Gucheng District, Lijiang, Yunnan
- Jinan, Hubei (zh; 纪南镇), town in and subdivision of Jingzhou District, Jingzhou, Hubei
  - Jinan (紀南), the ancient capital of the state of Chu, presently at Jiangling County, Hubei (zh).

==== Townships ====
- Jin'an Township, Yanting County (zh; 金安乡), subdivision of Yanting County, Sichuan
- Jin'an Hui Ethnic Township (zh; 进安回族乡), subdivision of Songpan County, Sichuan

== People ==
Jin An

- Jin An (born 1996), Taiwanese-Korean basketball player for South Korea
- Jin An, New Zealand politician, one of the candidates in the 2017 New Zealand general election by electorate
- Jin An (18th century), publisher of the Qi Lin Bayin
- Yan Jin An, founding first honorary president of Asia Ski Mountaineering Federation
- Emperor An of Jin (Jin An Di; 383–419)

Ji Nan

- Ji Nan, a Chinese soccer player; see List of Chinese football transfers winter 2012
- Ji Nan, a Chinese swimmer at the Swimming at the 2010 South American Games – Women's 200 metre butterfly

== Military ==
- Jinan (ship), two ships of the People's Liberation Army Navy of China
- Jinan Incident (1928), between the Nationalists of China and the Imperial Japanese
- Battle of Jinan (1948), between the Nationalists and Communists during the Civil War

== Other uses ==
- Jinan dialect (济南话), dialect of the Mandarin language family, spoken in Jinan, Shandong, China

== See also ==
- Ji (disambiguation)
- Nan (disambiguation)
- Jin (disambiguation)
- An (disambiguation)
- Anjin (disambiguation)
- Nanji
