= Naci =

Naci or NACI may refer to:

== Given name ==
- Ali Naci Karacan (1896–1955), Turkish journalist and publisher
- Muallim Naci (1850–1893), Ottoman-Turkish writer, poet, teacher and critic
- Naci Bostancı (born 1957), Turkish politician and academic
- Naci Eldeniz (1875–1948), Turkish Army general
- Naci Erdem (born 1931), Turkish footballer
- Naci Özgüç (born 1964), Turkish conductor
- Naci Şensoy (born 1958), Turkish-Kosovar football manager
- Naci Taşdöğen (born 1962), Turkish actor
- Naci Tınaz (1882–1964), Ottoman officer and Turkish Army general
- Ömer Naci Soykan (born 1945), Turkish philosopher

== Other uses ==
- "Nací Orishas", a 2005 single by Orishas
- National Archives of the Cook Islands (NACI)
- National Advisory Committee on Immunization (NACI Canada)
- North Albion Collegiate Institute, Toronto High school

== See also ==
- Nacy (disambiguation)
- NaCl (disambiguation)
- NAC1 (disambiguation)
- Nasi (disambiguation)
- Naki (disambiguation)
- Naji, a related given name
- Nazism
