= NAC1 =

NAC1 may refer to:

- NAC1 (gene)
- NAC-1 or NAC Freelance, an aircraft

== See also ==
- Sodium chloride (chemical formula NaCl)
- Naci (disambiguation)
- NaCl (disambiguation)
