= Daxing Township, Songpan County =

Daxing Township 大姓乡
- Township
- Location in Sichuan
- Coordinates: 32°28′34″N 103°41′48″E
- Country: People's Republic of China
- Province: Sichuan
- Autonomous prefecture: Ngawa Tibetan and Qiang Autonomous Prefecture
- County: Songpan County
- Time zone: UTC+8 (China Standard)

Daxing Township (simplified Chinese: 大姓乡; traditional Chinese: 大姓鄉; pinyin: Dàxìng Xiāng; Tibetan: དཱ་ཞིན་ཡུལ་ཚོ།, Wylie: dā zhin yul tsho) is a township under the administration of Songpan County, Sichuan, China. As of 2018, it has five villages under its administration.

== See also ==
- List of township-level divisions of Sichuan
