= Type 381 radar =

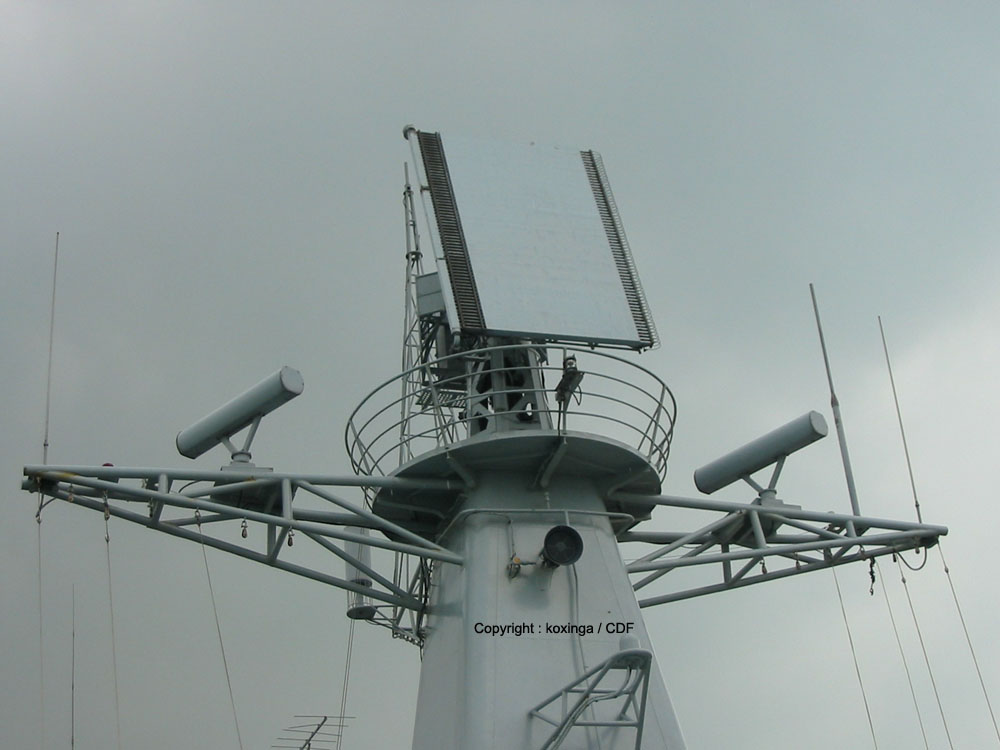
Type 381C on a Type 051B destroyer

The Type 381 (NATO reporting name: Rice Screen) is a 3D G-band air search radar developed by the People's Republic of China. It was the first modern air search radar fitted to a People's Liberation Army Navy warship, the Type 053K frigate Yingtan.

== Variants ==
- Type 381A (NATO reporting name: Rice Screen)
- Type 381C (NATO reporting name: Rice Shield)
