= NaCl (disambiguation) =

NaCl is the chemical formula for sodium chloride, also known as table salt.

NaCl may also refer to:

- Saline (medicine), the salt solution used as a medication, including cleaning wounds, irrigating nasal passages, flushing eyes, rinsening contact lenses and provide intravenous hydration
- NaCl (software), a public domain networking and cryptography library
- Google NaCl, a sandboxing technology

== See also ==
- Naci (disambiguation)
- NAC1 (disambiguation)
