= Naji =

- Gender: Male

Origin
- Origin: Arabic
- Meaning: Survivor

Naji (Turkish), Arabic: ناجي, Nājī) is an Arabic male given name, which is derived from the Arabic verb to survive. It is also a surname.

== Given name ==
- Najee Harris (born 1998), American football player
- Naji al-Ali (1938–1987), Palestinian cartoonist, noted for political criticism of Israel
- Nagy Habib (born 1952), Egyptian professor, surgeon
- Naji Hakim (born 1955), French citizen of Lebanese origin, organist and composer
- Naji Majrashi (born 1982), Saudi footballer
- Naji Marshall (born 1998), American basketball player
- Naji Jamil (1893–1980), Syrian pilot and military officer
- Naji Sabri (born 1951), Iraqi diplomat, Foreign Minister under Saddam Hussein
- Naji Shawkat (1893–1980), Iraqi politician, Prime Minister 1932–33
- Naji Shushan (born 1981), Libyan footballer
- Naji al-Suwaidi (1882–1942), Iraqi politician, Prime Minister 1929–30
- Naji Talib (1917–2012), Iraqi politician, Prime Minister 1966–67

== Surname ==
- Aziz Abdul Naji (born 1975), Algerian prisoner at Guantanamo Bay
- Fehmi Naji (1928–2016), Australian Muslim leader
- Ismail Qasim Naji (born 1969), Somali military leader
- Kamal Naji (1951–2009), Palestinian politician
- Oras Sultan Naji (1962–2015), Yemeni politician
- Reza Naji (born 1942), Iranian actor
- Kasra Naji, Iranian journalist

== See also ==
- Nnaji, surname
- Noji, surname
- Nagy
