= Jiandi Dao =

Jiandi Dao (湔氐道) was a prefecture of ancient China located around today's Songpan region, in the east of Qingzang Plateau and northwest part of Sichuan province.

Jiandi Dao was founded by Qin (秦) after it conquered Shu (蜀) in 316 BC. The Han dynasty reestablished Jiandi Dao in the sixth year of Yuanding (元鼎六年, AD 111). Jiandi Dao was changed to Jiandi County and became a constitute part of Wenshan Jun (汶山郡) in the Jin dynasty.

Di (氐) is an ancient large ethnic group lived in west China which is sometimes considered to be part of Qiang, called Diqiang. Dao (道) in the Qin and Han dynasties is a kind of administrative unit which were mainly settled by primitive tribes.
