= Muallim Naci =

Ottoman writer, poet, educator and literary critic

- معلّم ناجى
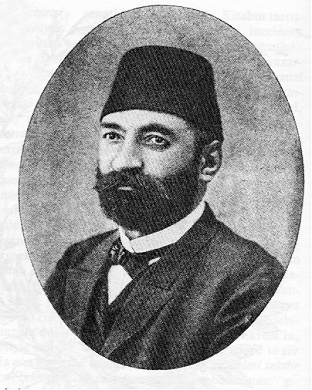
- Born: Ömer Ali; 1850; Istanbul, Ottoman Empire
- Died: 12 April 1893 (aged 43); Constantinople, Ottoman Empire
- Occupations: Writer, civil servant, educator and publisher
- Writing career
- Language: Ottoman Turkish
- Notable work: Lugat-i Nâcî

Muallim Naci (Ottoman Turkish: معلّم ناجى), literally "Naci The Teacher" (b. 1850 – d. 12 April 1893), was an Ottoman writer, poet, educator and literary critic.

He lived during the reform-oriented Tanzimat period of the Ottoman Empire and advocated modernization without breaking ties with the old. He contributed in criticisms about both the prose and the poetry, and acquired a special place in Turkish literature and society by studying problems and providing ideas that would affect the Turkish people. His work Lugat-i Nâcî, an Ottoman Turkish dictionary, is of major importance.

== Life ==
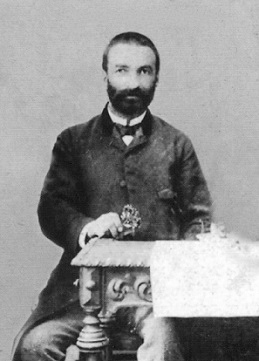
Muallim Naci, c. 1890

He was born at Saraçhanebaşı quarter of the Fatih district, Istanbul in 1850. His real name was Ömer. His father Ali Bey was a master saddler by profession, his mother Zehra Fatma Hanım was the daughter of an immigrant family from Varna (now in Bulgaria).

He started primary school in Istanbul. After his father's death, while seven years old, he went to Varna to live with his uncle. Since there was no opportunity to pursue a regular educational path, he tried to close the gap by taking various courses. He learned Arabic and Persian. After working on calligraphy and memorization of the Qur'an, he taught at Varna's Rüştiye (middle school). In those years, he chose "Naji" (Naci in Turkish) as his pen-name, and made some attempts in poetry.

After meeting with mutasarrıf Mehmed Said Pasha, he quit taking courses that had continued for nearly ten years, and became the Pasha's private katib. He traveled a lot in Rumelia and Anatolia. In 1881, he went to Chios with Mehmet Pasha. There he started writing poems and sent some to Tercüman-ı Hakikat ("Interpreter of Truth"); Kuzu ("Lamb") of 1881, Nusaybin Civarında Bir Vadi (a valley near Nusaybin) of 1882, Dicle ("Tigris") of 1883. After returning to Constantinople, he worked in the Foreign Ministry. When Mehmed Said Pasha was assigned to Berlin, Naci rejected the offer to go with him and he continued to serve in the Foreign Ministry. Shortly after he resigned from the civil service and began his career in journalism. Proposed by Ahmet Mithat Efendi, Naci became editor-in-chief of Tercüman-ı Hakikat. In 1884, he married Mediha Hanım, the daughter of Ahmet Mithat. After his promotion, he was engaged in learning French, which he succeeded in a short time. Some of his poems achieved fame because of the French translations.

Ateşpare (1883) was the first book of poetry, which was published in Istanbul, followed by Şerrare in 1884. On November 23, 1885, İmâdü'l-in Midâd (Peasant Girls Songs) poem was published. This poem became the first in Turkish literature to talk about the rural village life. He continued with two other books of poetry Füruzan (1886) and Sünbüle (1890). Hamiyet-yahut- Masa Bin Eb'il-Gazan that followed presented the memories of the tragedy of his childhood. It was translated and published in German in 1898, and in Russian in 1914. Meanwhile, he taught language and literature in civil and law schools. Between the years 1887 and 1888, he published Mecmua-i-Muallim, a weekly magazine, which continued for 58 issues.

In 1891, he began to work on his best known work Lûgat-i Naci, a dictionary of the Turkish language. With Naci's death in 1894, Ismet Müstecabizâ, a friend of his, finished the work.

Muallim Naci was an innovator in Ottoman-Turkish poetry. It was in favor of breaking the bonds of the old styles, and had many followers, among others Yahya Kemal. Naci criticized the lack of realistic literature of his time. He advocated the Turkish language. He endeavored to write simple; select and use old words which are placed colloquially to create harmony.

== Trivia ==
Muallim Naci was the first Turkish poet to use the phrase "I am a Turk" in a poem. He received the title "Tarih-Nüvîs-i Selatin-i Âl-i Osman" from the Sultan. Some schools in Turkey bear his name.
