= Nacy =

Nacy or NACY may refer to:

- Carol A. Nacy (born 1948), microbiologist and immunologist
- Richard R. Nacy (1895–1961), American politician
- Vegas Nacy, a member of the American rock band The Clay People
- NACY, ship radio callsign of USS Freedom (IX-43), a schooner
