= Chinese ship Jinan =

A number of vessels of the People's Liberation Army Navy have borne the name Jinan, after the provincial capital Jinan.

- Chinese escort ship Jinan (217), a Type D escort ship captured by the PLAN in 1950.
- Chinese destroyer Jinan (105), a Type 051 destroyer. Now a museum ship in Qingdao.
- Chinese destroyer Jinan (152), a Type 052C destroyer, in service since 2014.
