= Nanaji =

Nanaji is an Indian given name meaning 'maternal grandfather'. Notable people with the name include:

- Nanaji Deshmukh (1916–2010), Indian activist
- Nanaji Sitaram Shamkule, Indian politician

== See also ==
- Nanji
