= Zhenping Township, Sichuan =

Zhenping Township 镇坪乡
- Township
- Zhenpingxiang
- Location in Sichuan
- Coordinates: 32°13′52″N 103°46′7″E
- Country: People's Republic of China
- Province: Sichuan
- Autonomous prefecture: Ngawa Tibetan and Qiang Autonomous Prefecture
- County: Songpan County

Area
  - Total: 207.4 km^{2} (80.1 sq mi)

Population (2010)
  - Total: 3,393
  - Density: 16.36/km^{2} (42.37/sq mi)
- Time zone: UTC+8 (China Standard)

Zhenping (Chinese: 镇坪乡; pinyin: Zhènpíng xiāng; Tibetan: ཀྲོན་ཕན་ཡུལ་ཚོ།, Wylie: kron phan yul tsho) is a township in Songpan County, Ngawa Tibetan and Qiang Autonomous Prefecture, Sichuan, China. In 2010, Zhenping Township had a total population of 3,393: 1,712 males and 1,681 females: 773 aged under 14, 2,408 aged between 15 and 65 and 212 aged over 65.
