= Huanglong Township, Ngawa Tibetan and Qiang Autonomous Prefecture =

Huanglong Township 黄龙乡
- Township
- Huanglongxiang
- Location in Sichuan
- Coordinates: 32°46′56″N 103°54′33″E
- Country: People's Republic of China
- Province: Sichuan
- Autonomous prefecture: Ngawa Tibetan and Qiang Autonomous Prefecture
- County: Songpan County

Area
  - Total: 369.1 km^{2} (142.5 sq mi)

Population (2010)
  - Total: 1,423
  - Density: 3.855/km^{2} (9.985/sq mi)
- Time zone: UTC+8 (China Standard)
- Postal code: 623306

Huanglong (Chinese: 黄龙乡; pinyin: Huánglóng xiāng; Tibetan: གསེར་མཚོ་ཡུལ་ཚོ།, Wylie: gser mtsho yul tsho) is a township in Songpan County, Ngawa Tibetan and Qiang Autonomous Prefecture, Sichuan, China. In 2010, Huanglong Township had a total population of 1,423: 769 males and 655 females: 174 aged under 14, 1,191 aged between 15 and 65 and 59 aged over 65.

== See also ==
- List of township-level divisions of Sichuan
