= Nanji =

Nanji is a surname. Notable people with the surname include:

- Azim Nanji, Kenyan-born professor of Islamic studies
- Shenaaz Nanji (born 1954), Canadian writer

== See also ==
- Nanaji
- Nnaji
