= Chinese destroyer Jinan (105) =

Type 051 destroyer of the PLA Navy

Coordinates: 36.0548523°N 120.3210710°E

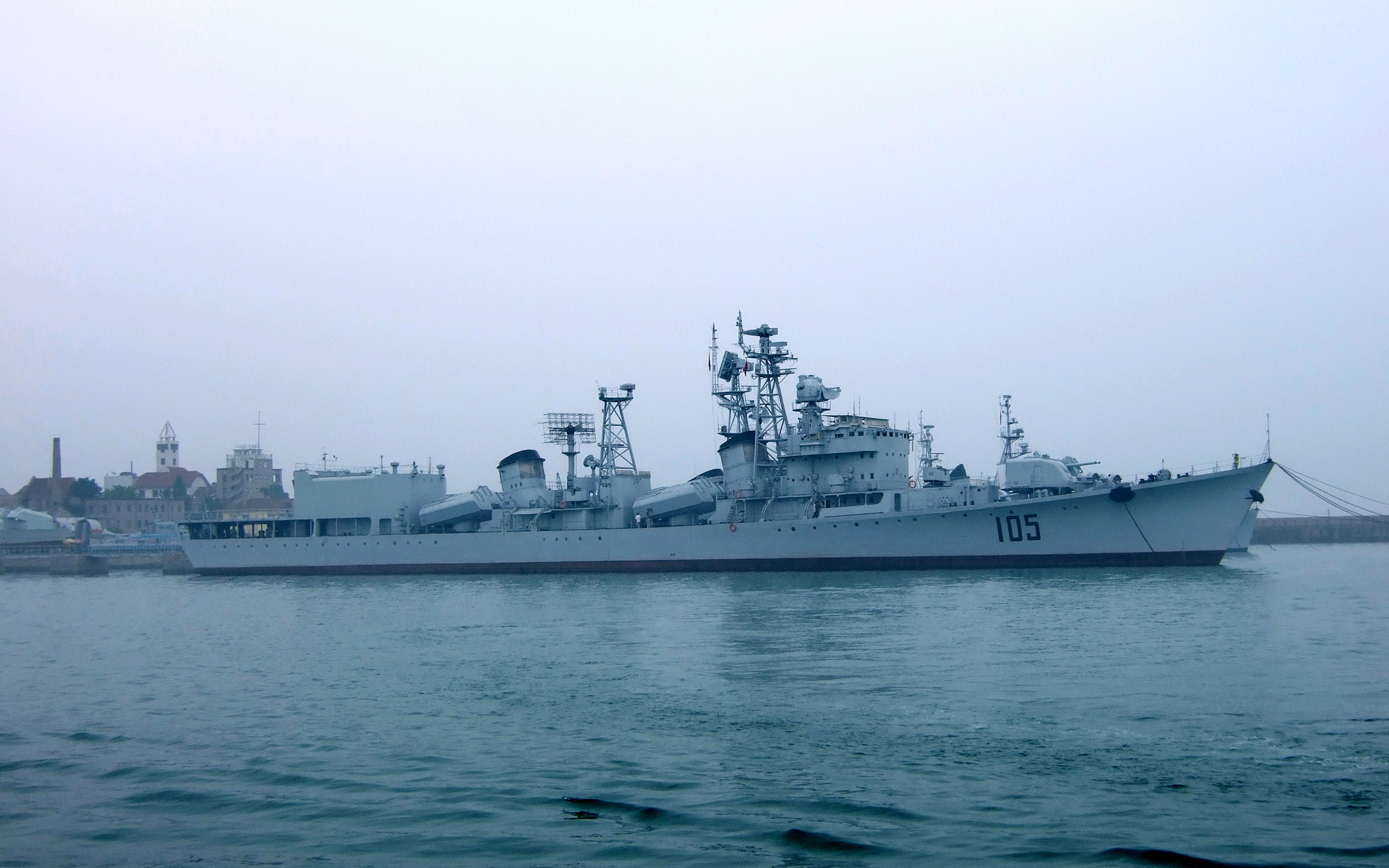
- Jinan at Qingdao Naval Museum on 11 July 2008

History

China
- Name: Jinan; (济南)
- Namesake: Jinan
- Builder: Luda Shipyard, Liaoning
- Launched: 30 July 1970
- Commissioned: 31 December 1971
- Decommissioned: 15 November 2007
- Identification: Pennant number: 105
- Status: Museum ship at Qingdao Naval Museum, Qingdao

General characteristics
- Class & type: Type 051 destroyer
- Displacement: 3,670 tons
- Length: 132 m (433 ft 1 in)
- Beam: 12.8 m (42 ft 0 in)
- Draught: 4.6 m (15 ft 1 in)
- Propulsion: 2 steam turbines; 72,000 shp (53,700 kW)
- Speed: 32 knots (59 km/h)
- Range: 2,970 miles
- Complement: 280
- Armament: 16 anti-ship missiles; 8 surface-to-air missiles + 16 spare (manual reload); 2 twin-barrel 130 mm dual purpose guns; 4 Type 76A dual-37 mm anti-aircraft guns; 2 Type 75 anti-submarine rocket systems; 6 torpedo tubes; Depth charges; 38 naval mines
- Aircraft carried: 1-2 helicopters: Harbin Z-9C ASW/SAR
- Aviation facilities: Hangar and flight deck; Landing assistance system

Jinan (105) is a Type 051 destroyer of the People's Liberation Army Navy.

== Development and design ==
The PLAN began designing a warship armed with guided missiles in 1960 based on the Soviet Neustrashimy, with features from the Kotlin-class destroyer, but the Sino-Soviet split stopped work. Work resumed in 1965 with nine ships being ordered.

== Construction and career ==
Jinan was launched on 30 July 1970 at the Luda Shipyard in Shanghai. Commissioned on 31 December 1971.

She was decommissioned on 15 November 2007 and currently she sits at Qingdao Naval Museum, Qingdao as a museum ship.

== Gallery ==
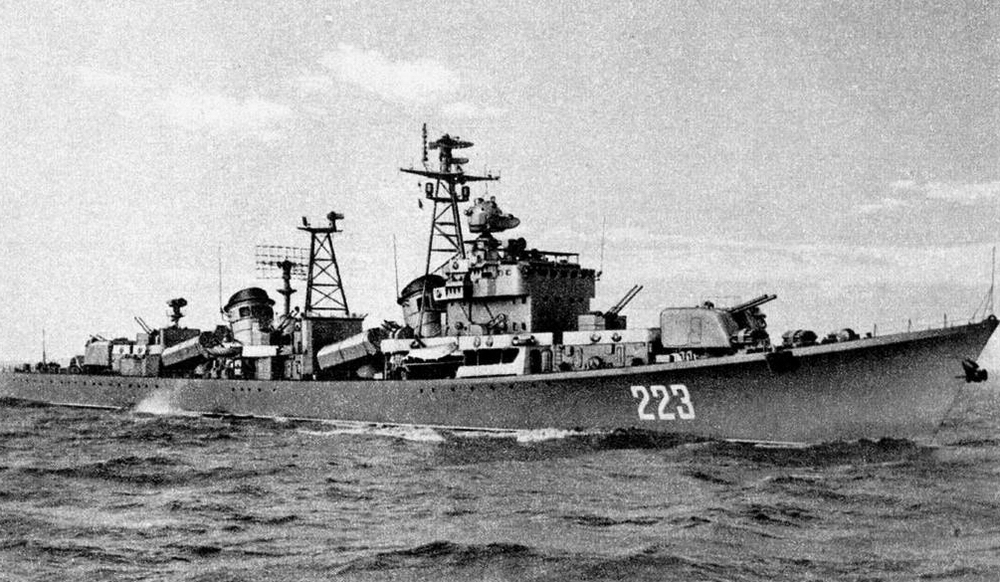
Nanjing underway in 1970.

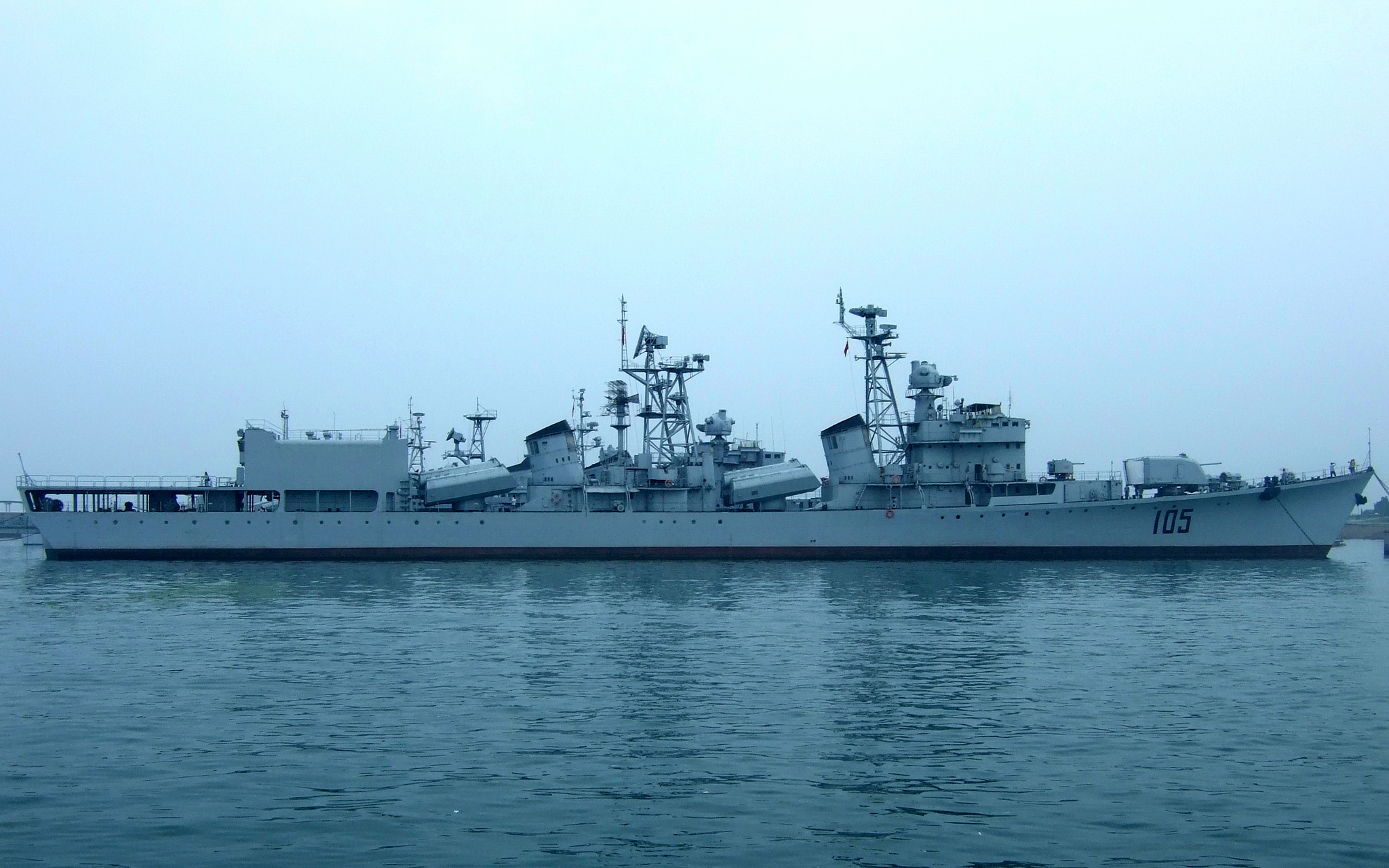
Jinan's on 11 July 2008.

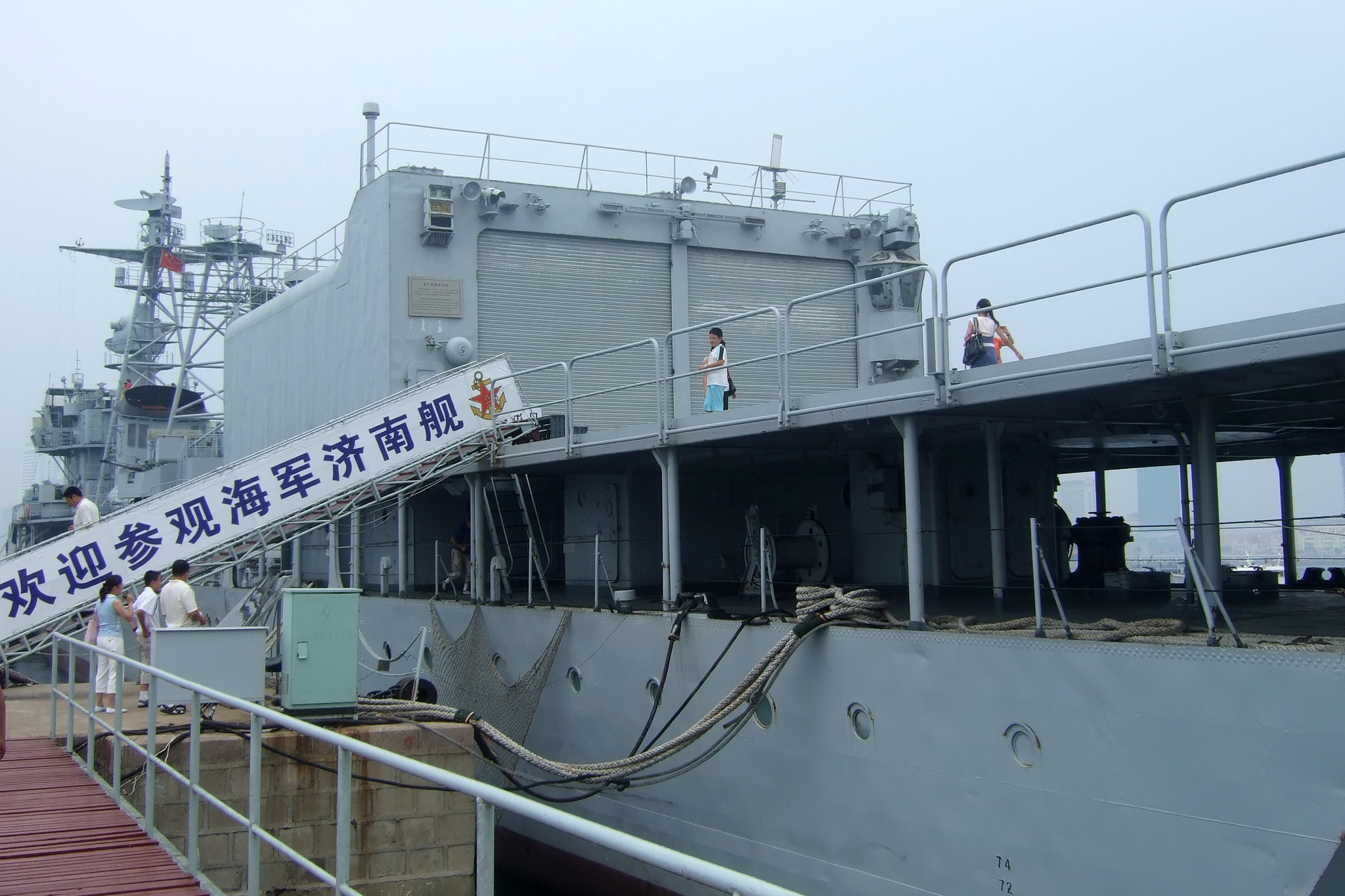
Jinan's hangar on 13 July 2008.

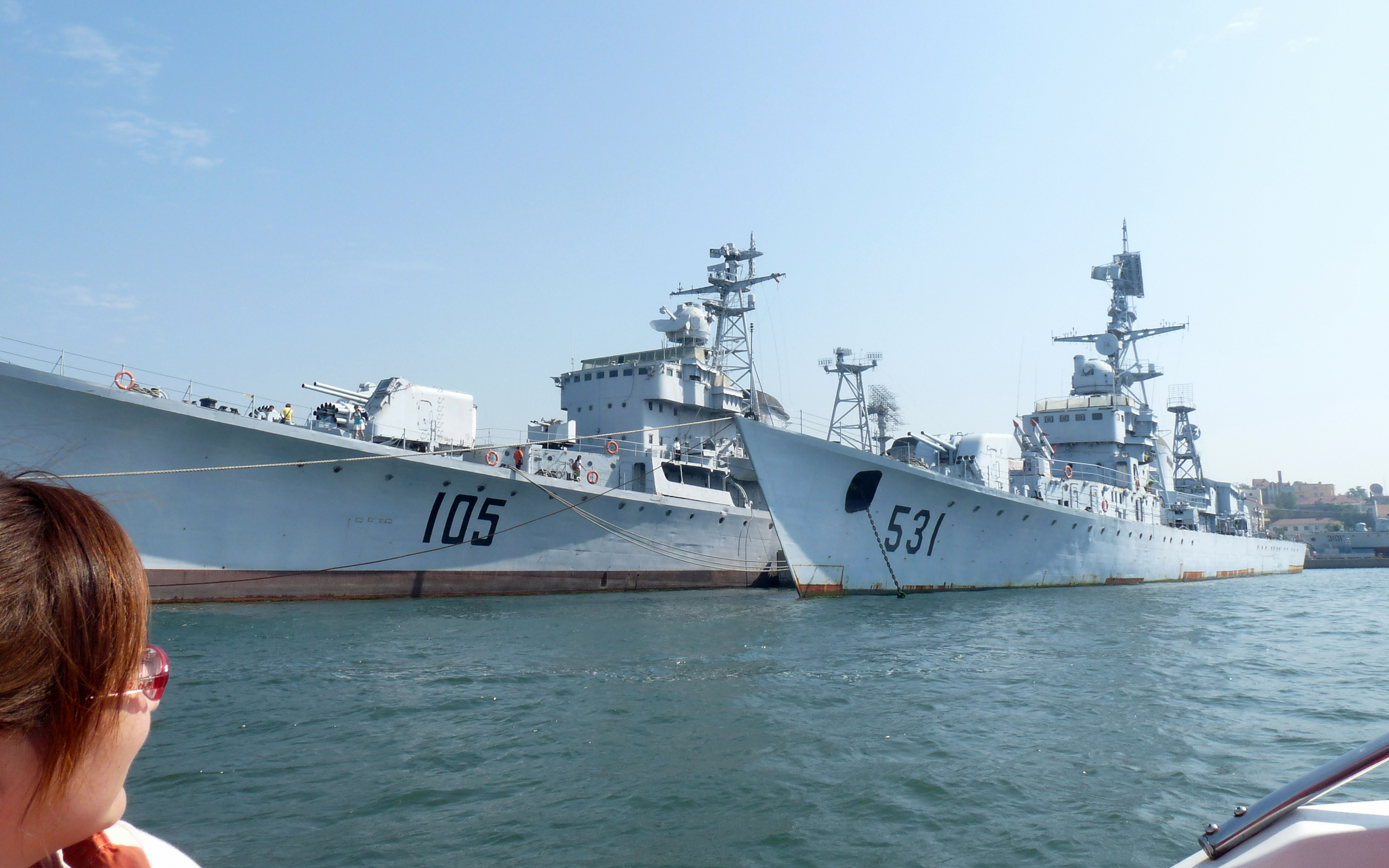
Jinan and Yingtan on 4 September 2011.

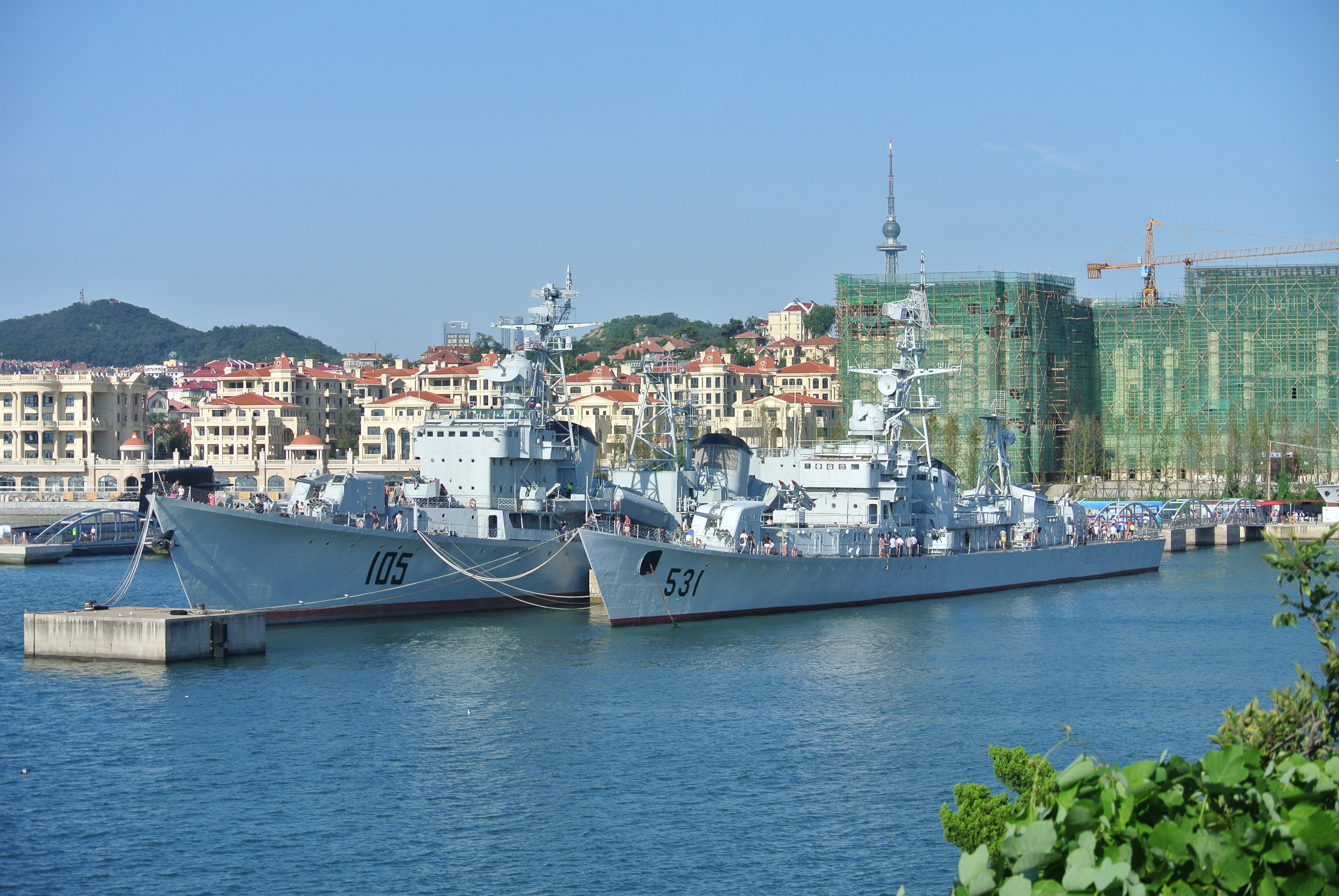
Jinan and Yingtan on 4 September 2011.

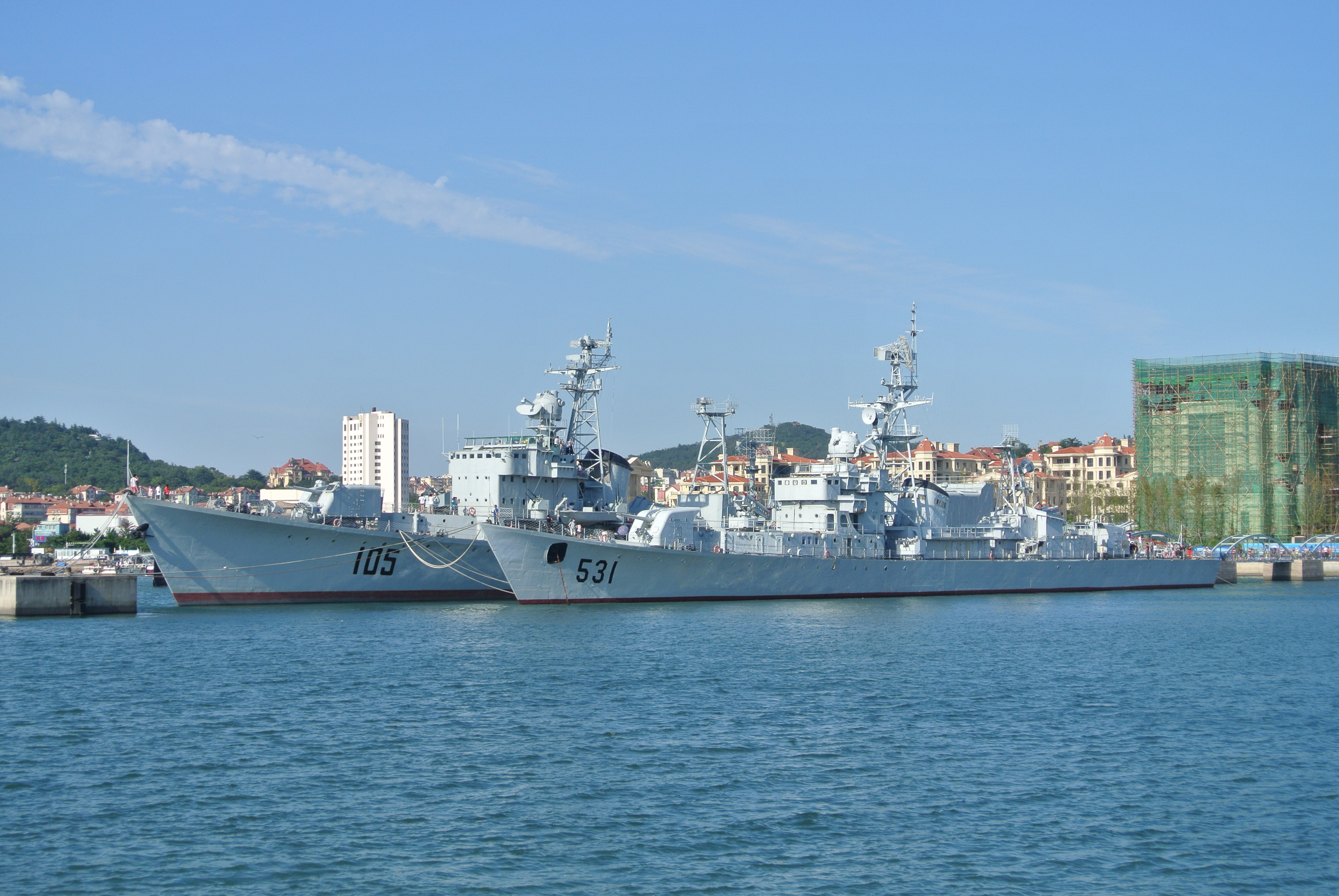
Jinan and Yingtan on 4 September 2011.

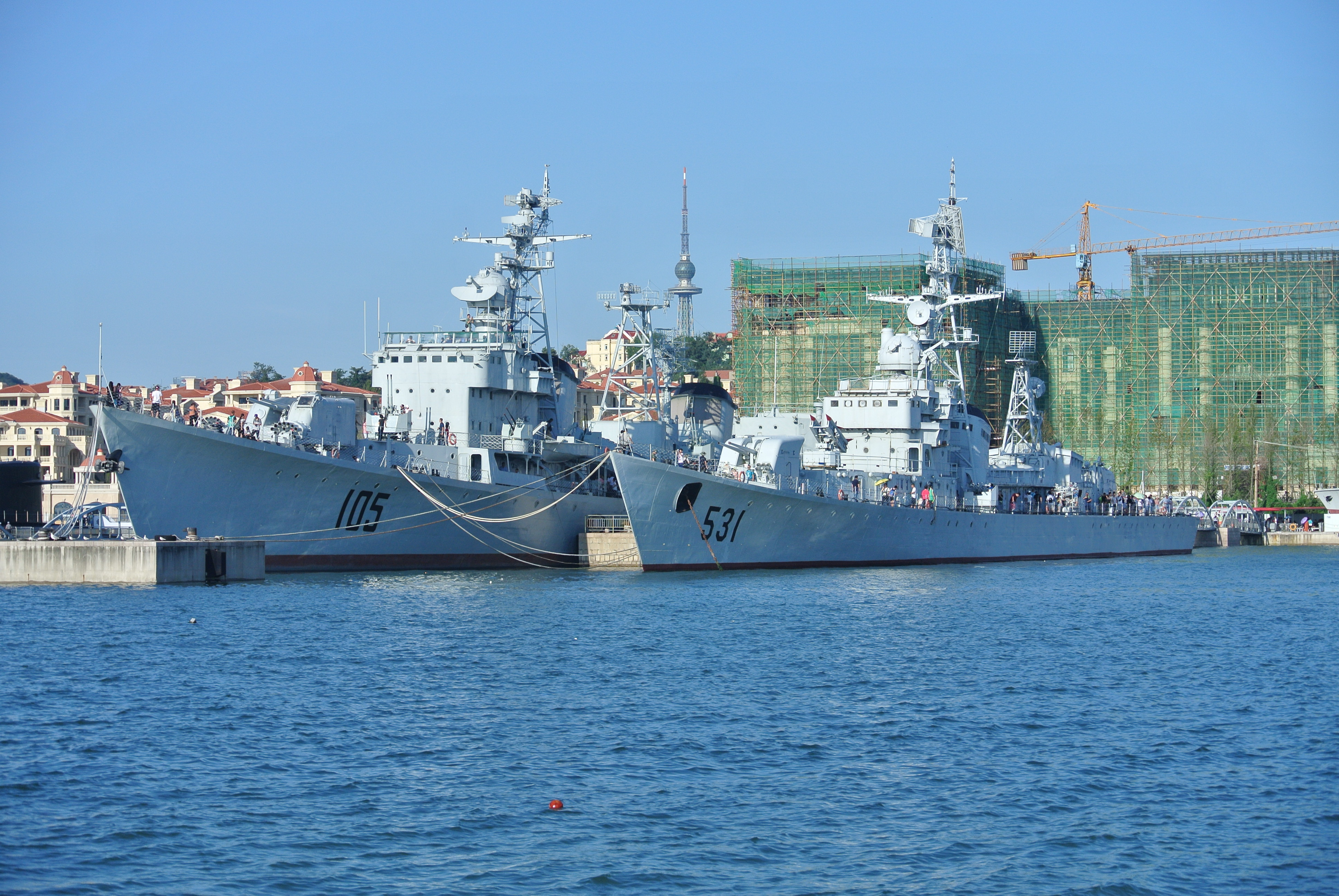
Jinan and Yingtan on 4 September 2011.

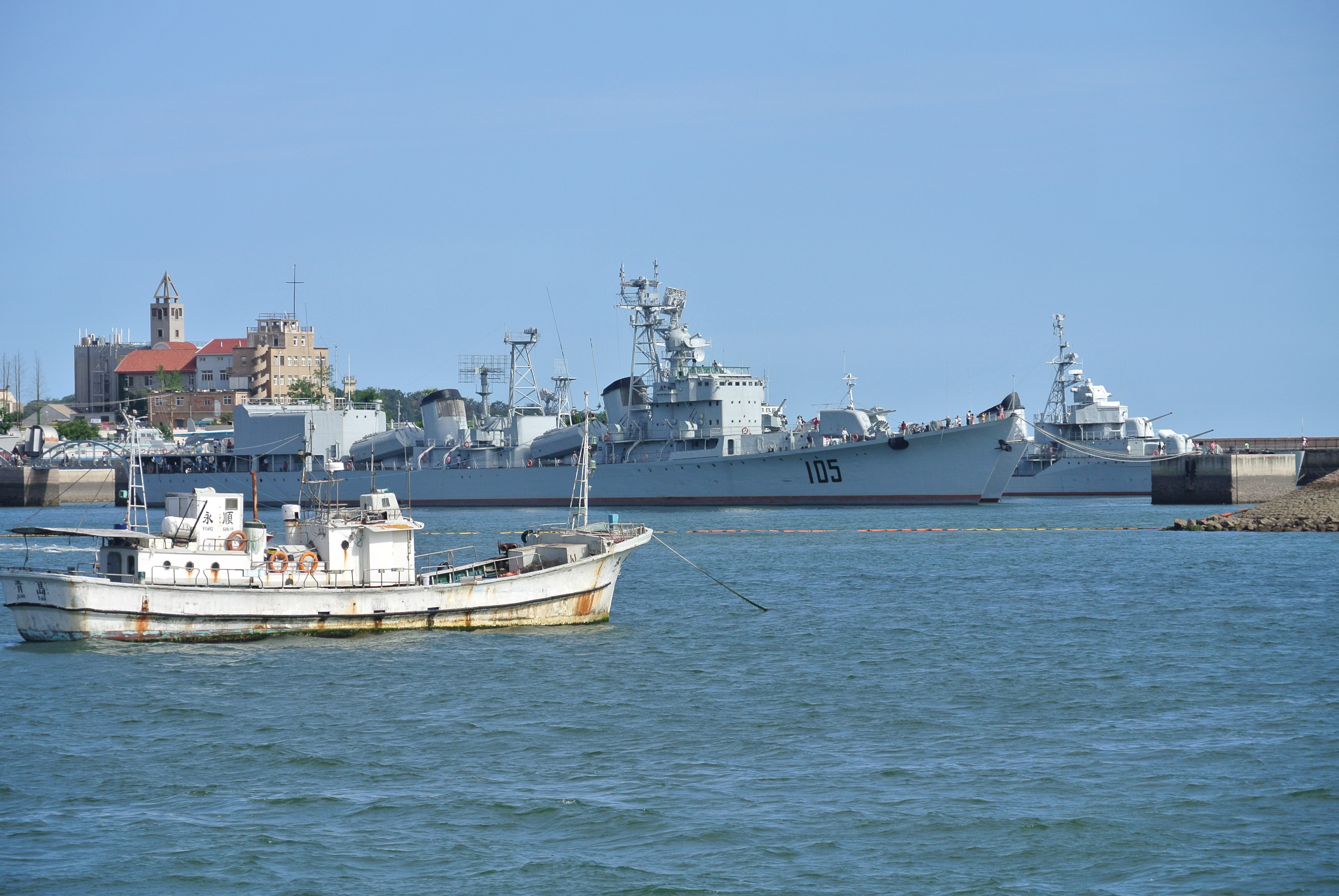
Jinan on 4 September 2011.
