= Jin'an Town, Sichuan =

Jin'an Town
- Town

Chinese transcription(s)
  - Simplified: 进安镇
  - Traditional: 進安鎮
  - Pinyin: Jìn'ān Zhèn
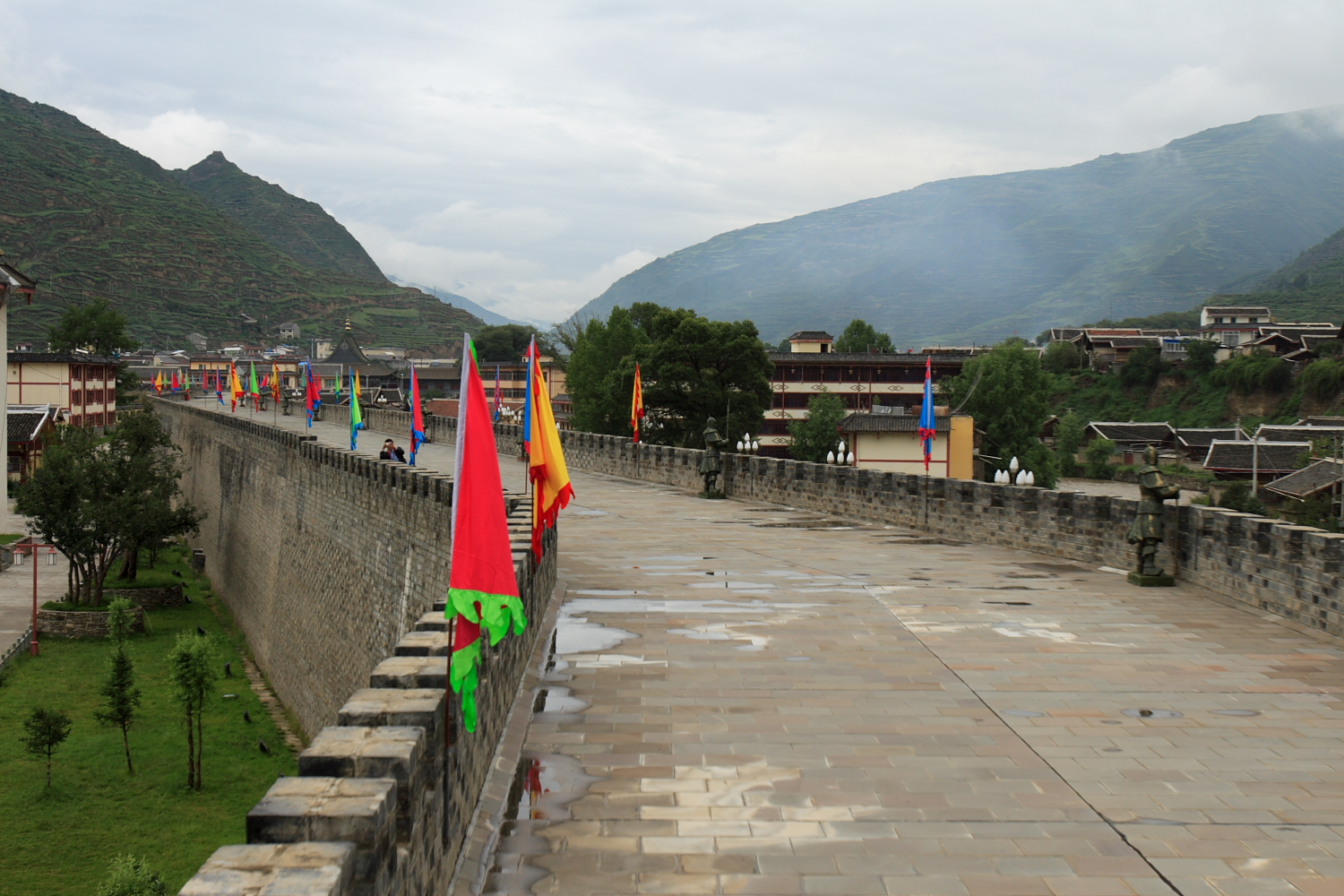

- Location in Sichuan
- Coordinates: 32°38′22″N 103°34′50″E
- Country: China
- Province: Sichuan
- Prefecture: Ngawa
- County: Songpan

Area
  - Total: 2 km^{2} (0.77 sq mi)
- Elevation: 2,849.5 m (9,349 ft)

Population (2009)
  - Total: 12,361
  - Density: 6,200/km^{2} (16,000/sq mi)
- Time zone: UTC+8 (China Standard)
- Postal code: 623399
- Area code: 0837

Jin'an Town is a town and the county seat of Songpan County in the Ngawa Tibetan and Qiang Autonomous Prefecture of Sichuan, China. The town is situated on the Min River and famous for its Songpan Ancient Town.

== See also ==
- List of township-level divisions of Sichuan
