= Carol A. Nacy =

Microbiologist and immunologist

Carol A. Nacy (born 1948) is a microbiologist and immunologist focused on the immune response of bacterial and parasitic disease.

== Education and academic career ==
Nacy did her undergraduate and PhD studies at Catholic University in Washington, DC receiving her degree in 1976. She did her postdoc work at the Walter Reed Army Institute of Research in the Department of Rickettsial Diseases and then became a staff scientist at the same institute for 17 years. Her research concerned the understanding and treatment of a number of infections including those caused by Francisella tularensis and Leishmania major.

== Industrial career ==
Nacy founded Sequella in 1997 and continues as CEO. Sequella focuses on clinical stage antibiotic development, in particular against Mycobacterium tuberculosis (TB).

== Awards and honors ==
Nacy was the president of the American Society of Microbiology (1996-1997) and the Society for Leukocyte Biology (1992). She was awarded the Lifetime Achievement Award in Science at Catholic University in 2002. Women in BIO named her Entrepreneur of the Year (2004) and honored her with a Special Outstanding Achievement Award for Clinical Trials (2007). In December 2009 she was awarded the Humanitarian Award, Hope is a Vaccine, by the Global Alliance for Immunization against Aids (GAIA) for her work to create new drugs for TB.

== Personal life ==
Nacy is married to Monte S. Meltzer, M.D., has 5 children and 3 grandchildren.
