= Jinan, Iran =

Jinan جينان
- Village
- Location within Iran
- Coordinates: 33°23′17″N 59°21′32″E
- Country: Iran
- Province: South Khorasan
- County: Qaen
- Bakhsh: Sedeh
- Rural District: Sedeh

Population (2006)
  - Total: 78
- Time zone: UTC+3:30 (IRST)
  - Summer (DST): UTC+4:30 (IRDT)

Jinan (Persian: جينان, also Romanized as Jīnān; also known as Janyān, Jainu, and Jeynū) is a village in Sedeh Rural District, Sedeh District, Qaen County, South Khorasan Province, Iran. At the 2006 census, its population was 78, in 29 families.
