= Oras Sultan Naji =

Yemeni politician (1962–2015)

Member of the House of Representatives of Yemen
- In office 1997–2015

Personal details
- Born: 1962
- Died: February 26, 2015 (aged 52–53)
- Party: General People's Congress
- Known for: One of only two women to serve in the Yemeni parliament

Oras Sultan Naji (1962 – 26 February 2015) was a member of the House of Representatives of Yemen from 1997 until her death. She was a member of the General People's Congress (GPC) party. She was one of only two women to have sat in the Yemeni parliament, the other being Uluf Bakhubaria, who was also elected in 1997.
