= Anjin =

Anjin is the Japanese word for pilot (of ships, airplanes and similar things). It may also refer to:

- Anjin Miura, an honorific name given to the sailor William Adams (1564-1620)
- The name given to the character John Blackthorne in James Clavell's 1975 novel Shōgun
  - "Anjin" (Shōgun), the first episode of the 2024 miniseries adapted from the book
