= Swimming at the 2010 South American Games – Women's 200 metre butterfly =

The Women's 200m butterfly event at the 2010 South American Games was held on March 28, with the heats at 11:19 and the Final at 18:25.

== Medalists ==
Gold	Silver	Bronze
Joanna Maranhão; Brazil	Andreina Pinto; Venezuela	Georgina Bardach; Argentina

== Records ==
Standing records prior to the 2010 South American Games
World record	Liu Zige (CHN)	2:01.81	Ji Nan, China	21 October 2009
Competition Record	Florencia Ghione (ARG)	2:16.11	Buenos Aires, Argentina	17 November 2006
South American record	Joanna Maranhão (BRA)	2:09.41	Palhoça, Brazil	5 September 2009

== Results ==
=== Heats ===
Rank	Heat	Lane	Athlete	Result	Notes
1	2	4	Joanna Maranhão (BRA)	2:16.33	Q
2	1	5	Andreina Pinto (VEN)	2:18.07	Q
3	2	5	Georgina Bardach (ARG)	2:20.52	Q
4	1	4	Daiene Dias (BRA)	2:21.92	Q
5	1	3	Jessica Camposano (COL)	2:22.18	Q
6	2	6	Eliana Barrios (VEN)	2:22.25	Q
7	2	2	Antonella Scanavino (URU)	2:22.73	Q
8	2	3	Karen Nicole Antonini (ARG)	2:22.88	Q
9	1	6	Carolina Restrepo (COL)	2:26.70	
10	1	2	Ximena Elisabeth Espinol (ECU)	2:26.80	
11	2	7	Daniela Reyes (CHI)	2:34.50	
12	1	7	Karlene van der Jagt (SUR)	2:46.09	

=== Final ===
Rank	Lane	Athlete	Result	Notes
1st place, gold medalist(s)	4	Joanna Maranhão (BRA)	2:13.22	CR
2nd place, silver medalist(s)	5	Andreina Pinto (VEN)	2:15.52	
3rd place, bronze medalist(s)	3	Georgina Bardach (ARG)	2:17.31	
4	7	Eliana Barrios (VEN)	2:19.61	
5	2	Jessica Camposano (COL)	2:21.37	
6	8	Karen Nicole Antonini (ARG)	2:25.01	
7	6	Daiene Dias (BRA)	2:26.22	
	1	Antonella Scanavino (URU)	DSQ	
