= Nnaji =

Nnaji is a surname of Igbo origin. Notable people with the name include:

- Bartholomew Nnaji (born 1956), a Nigerian scientist
- David Nnaji (born 1985), a Nigerian filmmaker, actor and writer
- Genevieve Nnaji (born 1979), Nigerian actress
- Gilbert Nnaji (born 1966), Nigerian politician
- James Nnaji (born 2004), professional basketball player
- Peace Uzoamaka Nnaji (born 1952), a Nigerian politician
- Scott Nnaji, Nigerian women's basketball coach
- Zeke Nnaji (born 2001), American basketball player

== See also ==
- Naji, given name and surname
