= Songpan County =

Songpan County 松潘县 · ཟུང་ཆུ་རྫོང་། · Ssez Sungqu
- County
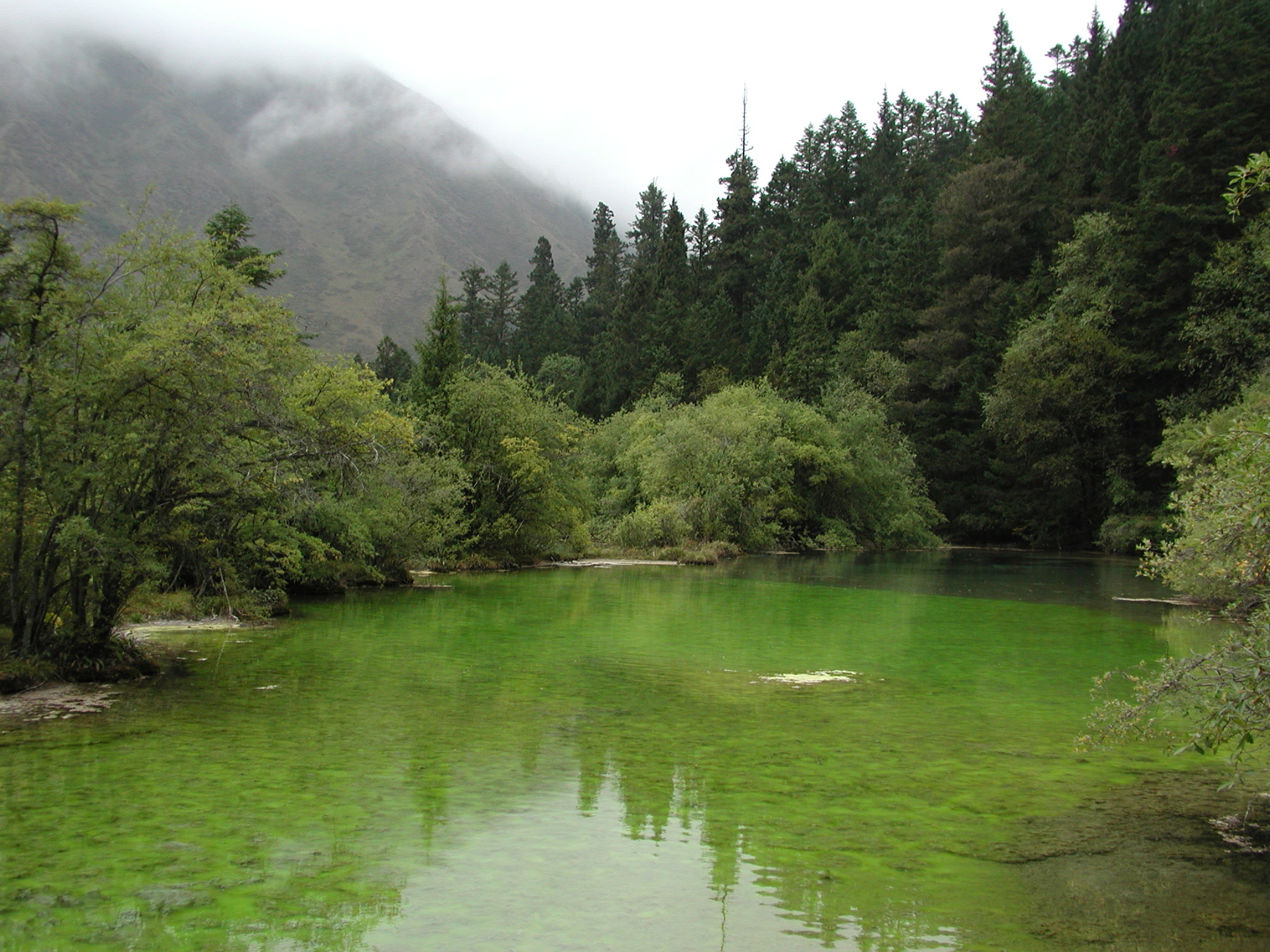
- Terrace in Huanglong Scenic and Historic Interest Area

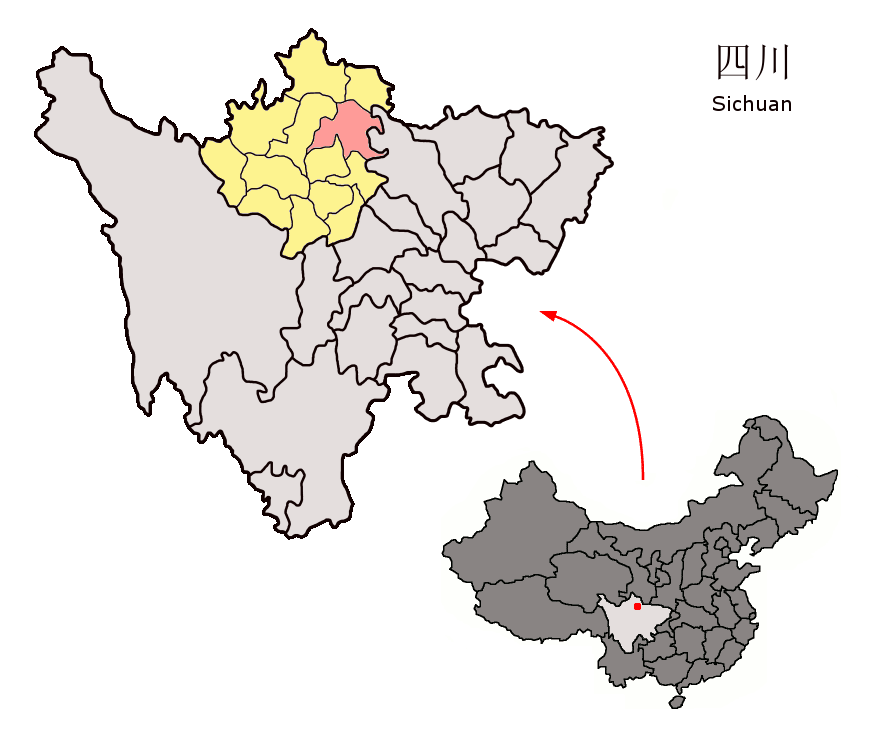
- Location of Songpan County (red) within Ngawa Prefecture (yellow) and Sichuan

- Location of the seat in Sichuan Songpan (China)
- Coordinates: 32°39′N 103°36′E
- Country: China
- Province: Sichuan
- Autonomous prefecture: Ngawa
- County seat: Jin'an

Area
  - Total: 8,486 km^{2} (3,276 sq mi)
- Elevation: 2,867 m (9,406 ft)

Population (2020)
  - Total: 66,937
  - Density: 7.888/km^{2} (20.43/sq mi)
  - Major nationalities: Tibetan Han Qiang Hui
- Time zone: UTC+8 (China Standard)
- Postal code: 623300
- Area code: 0837
- Website: www.songpan.gov.cn

Songpan County

Chinese name
- Simplified Chinese: 松潘县
- Traditional Chinese: 松潘縣
Transcriptions
Standard Mandarin
- Hanyu Pinyin: Sōngpān Xiàn

Alternative Chinese name
- Chinese: 松州
Transcriptions
Standard Mandarin
- Hanyu Pinyin: Sōngzhōu

Tibetan name
- Tibetan: ཟུང་ཆུ་རྫོང་།
Transcriptions
- Wylie: zung chu rdzong
- Tibetan Pinyin: Sungqu Zong

Qiang name
- Qiang: Ssez

Songpan County, formerly Songzhou, is a county in northwestern Sichuan province, China, and is one of the 13 counties administered by the Ngawa Tibetan and Qiang Autonomous Prefecture. It has an area of 8,486 square kilometres (3,276 sq mi), and a population of approximately 68,000 composed of Tibetan, Qiang, Han and Hui populations.

== History ==
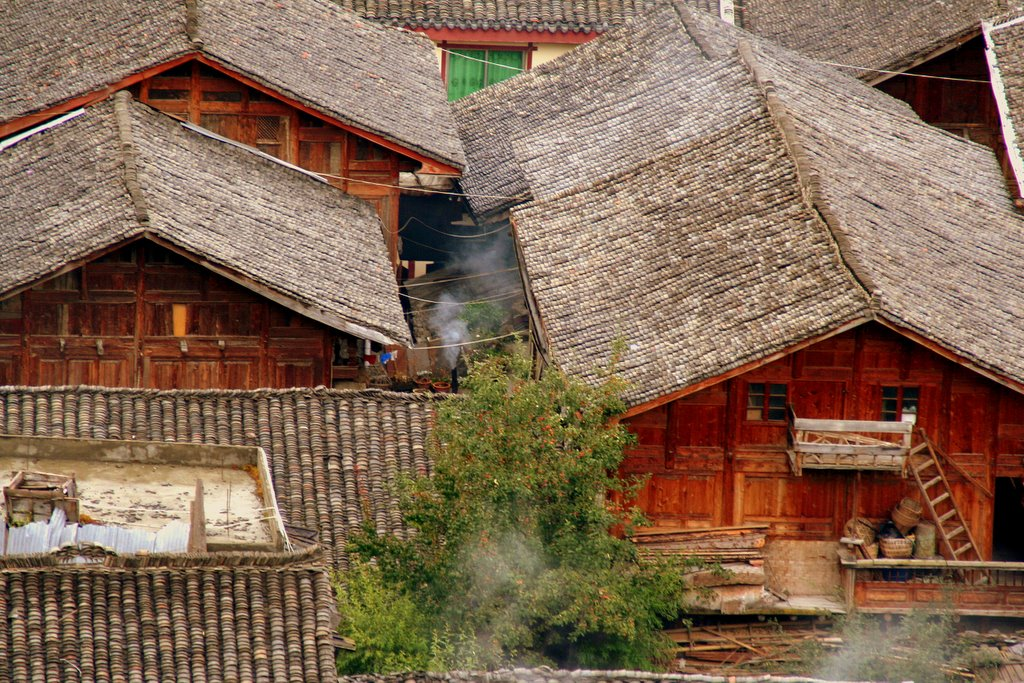
Architecture in Songpan

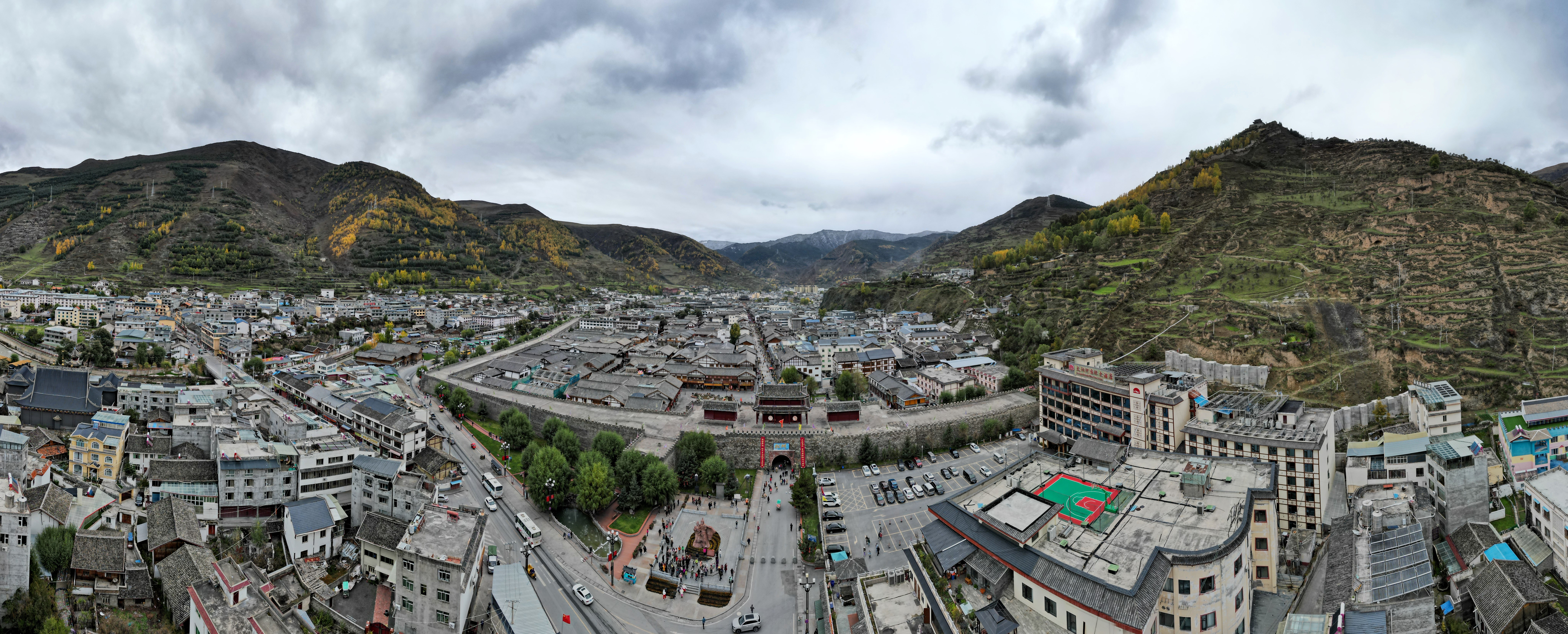
Aerial panorama of Songpan Ancient City. October 2023.

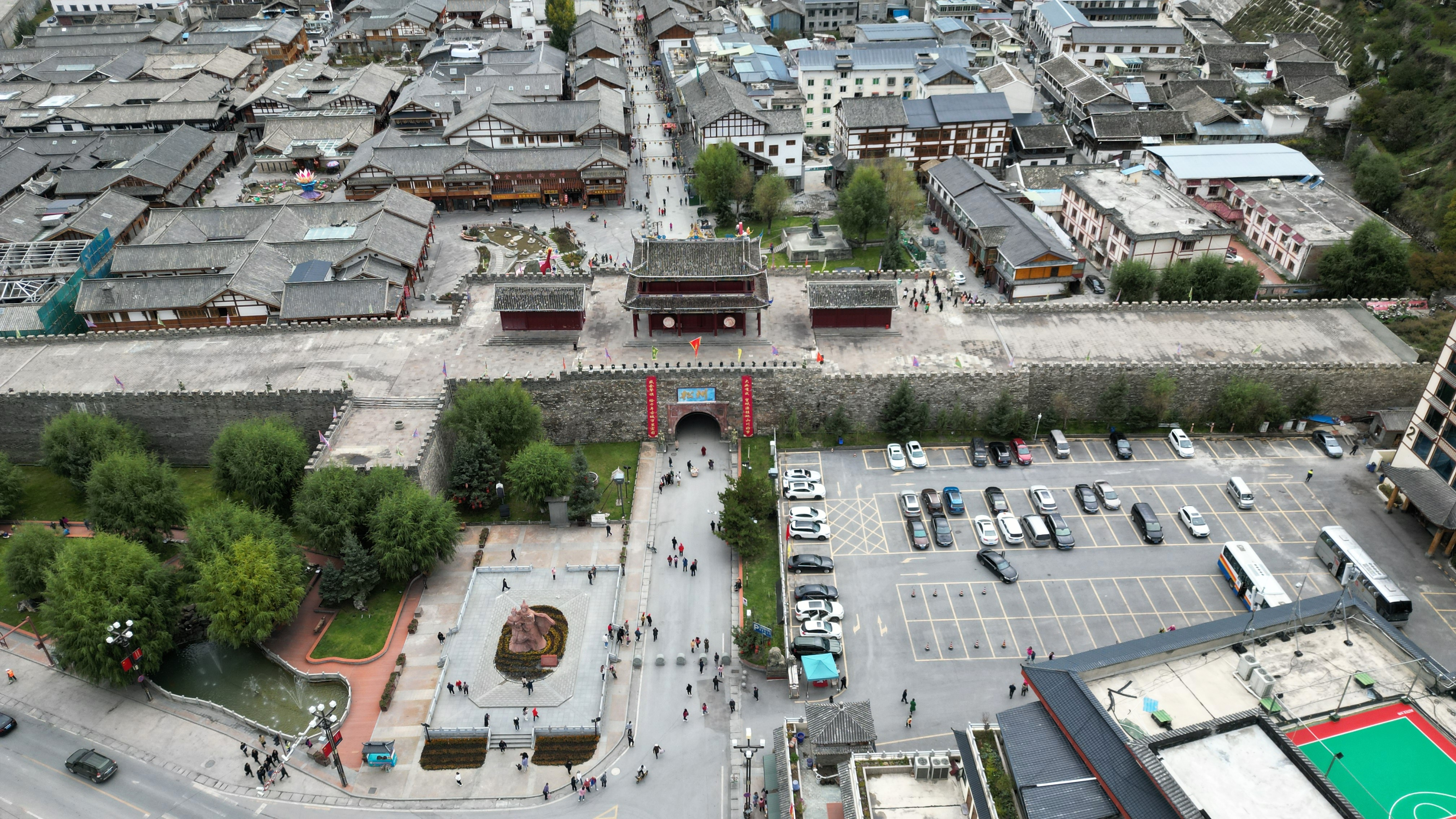
Aerial perspective of the Songpan Ancient City walls and fort. October 2023.

The ancient city of Songpan was built during the Tang dynasty and it was later rebuilt during Ming dynasty. Songpan was an important military post. It was also an important economic and trading center for horse and tea exchange between Sichuan, Gansu, Qinghai and Tibet.

During Tang rule, it was the border with the Tibetan Empire. Emperor Songtsen Gampo of Tibet tried to invade Tang China through this gate. Emperor Taizong of Tang offered him Princess Wencheng at Songzhou (now Songpan) in 641. According to Tibetan and Chinese legends, Princess Wencheng then brings with her among other things the Jowo statue to the Tibetan Empire. Throughout the Ming dynasty, the Chinese court was troubled by the frequent invasion of the Songpan area. The area was given to a Tibetan lama friendly with the Chinese court to maintain frontier control while leaving it in local hands.

In August 1935, led by Mao Zedong and Zhou Enlai, the retreating People's Liberation Army marched through the Songpan Grasslands to advance to the northwestern province.

Songpan and the countryside surrounding the city offers a variety of tourist attractions. The hills surrounding the city are home Tibetan cattle herders. The county has ten named mountains.

== Geography and climate ==
Songpan covers latitudes 32° 06′−33° 09′ N and longitudes 102° 38′−104° 15′ E, and has a total area of 8,608 square kilometres (3,324 sq mi). Neighbouring counties are Pingwu to the east, Beichuan to the southeast, Mao to the south, Hongyuan and Heishui to the southwest, and Jiuzhaigou and Zoigê to the north.

Due to its altitude, Songpan has a humid continental climate (Köppen Dwb), with cool winters and warm, rainy summers. The monthly 24-hour average temperature ranges from −3.4 °C (25.9 °F) in January to 14.8 °C (58.6 °F) in July, and the annual mean is 6.28 °C (43.3 °F). The high elevation also results in a large diurnal temperature variation, exceeding 17 °C (31 °F) in winter. More than 70% of the 708 mm (27.9 in) of annual precipitation occurs from May to September. With monthly percent possible sunshine ranging from 31% in September to 57% in December, the county seat receives 1,831 hours of bright sunshine annually.

Climate data for Songpan, elevation 2,881 m (9,452 ft), (1991–2020 normals, extremes 1951–present)
Month	Jan	Feb	Mar	Apr	May	Jun	Jul	Aug	Sep	Oct	Nov	Dec	Year
Record high °C (°F)	22.3 (72.1)	21.2 (70.2)	25.4 (77.7)	28.2 (82.8)	35.6 (96.1)	30.7 (87.3)	31.2 (88.2)	31.6 (88.9)	29.5 (85.1)	26.7 (80.1)	24.0 (75.2)	19.7 (67.5)	35.6 (96.1)
Mean daily maximum °C (°F)	6.9 (44.4)	9.2 (48.6)	12.0 (53.6)	15.4 (59.7)	18.1 (64.6)	20.2 (68.4)	22.7 (72.9)	22.6 (72.7)	19.5 (67.1)	14.5 (58.1)	11.2 (52.2)	8.1 (46.6)	15.0 (59.1)
Daily mean °C (°F)	−3.4 (25.9)	−0.4 (31.3)	3.3 (37.9)	7.0 (44.6)	10.2 (50.4)	13.0 (55.4)	15.1 (59.2)	14.7 (58.5)	11.8 (53.2)	7.0 (44.6)	1.8 (35.2)	−2.4 (27.7)	6.5 (43.7)
Mean daily minimum °C (°F)	−10.0 (14.0)	−6.8 (19.8)	−2.7 (27.1)	1.2 (34.2)	4.9 (40.8)	8.1 (46.6)	10.0 (50.0)	9.6 (49.3)	7.2 (45.0)	2.6 (36.7)	−4.0 (24.8)	−8.8 (16.2)	0.9 (33.7)
Record low °C (°F)	−21.1 (−6.0)	−18.5 (−1.3)	−17.4 (0.7)	−9.6 (14.7)	−4.8 (23.4)	−2.3 (27.9)	0.4 (32.7)	−1.3 (29.7)	−4.3 (24.3)	−9.5 (14.9)	−18.1 (−0.6)	−20.7 (−5.3)	−21.1 (−6.0)
Average precipitation mm (inches)	6.8 (0.27)	13.2 (0.52)	34.3 (1.35)	68.0 (2.68)	119.4 (4.70)	119.0 (4.69)	98.6 (3.88)	83.7 (3.30)	104.5 (4.11)	77.9 (3.07)	14.4 (0.57)	3.9 (0.15)	743.7 (29.29)
Average precipitation days (≥ 0.1 mm)	5.8	7.9	13.5	16.3	21.2	21.6	17.5	15.1	17.8	18.5	7.3	3.8	166.3
Average snowy days	10.0	11.8	14.5	8.8	1.5	0.2	0	0.1	0.1	3.9	7.7	6.8	65.4
Average relative humidity (%)	51	53	58	62	66	71	72	71	73	71	61	53	64
Mean monthly sunshine hours	168.1	145.9	154.9	152.1	146.7	118.2	152.3	155.1	119.1	124.3	153.4	175.8	1,765.9
Percentage possible sunshine	53	47	41	39	34	28	35	38	33	36	49	57	41
Source 1: China Meteorological Administrationextremes
Source 2: Weather China

== Economy and tourism ==
The economy of Songpan is dominated by agriculture and livestock raising. In recent years, tourism has become an increasingly important sector, and is actively promoted by the authorities. Additionally, Songpan is popular among foreign students and other Chinese language learners staying in China as the base for treks through the scenic mountains nearby. Apart from the scenic attraction of Huanglong Scenic and Historic Interest Area which is located in the county, Songpan with its strategic location also acts as the gateway to Jiuzhaigou Valley at the north.

== Administrative divisions ==
Songpan County has 7 towns, 9 townships, one ethnic township, and one other township-level division.

Name	Simplified Chinese	Hanyu Pinyin	Tibetan	Wylie	Administrative division code
Towns
Jin'an Town (Jün'an)	进安镇	Jìn'ān Zhèn	ཅུན་ཨན་གྲོང་རྡལ།	cun an grong rdal	513224100
Jocanggoin Town (Chuanzhusi)	川主寺镇	Chuānzhǔsì Zhèn	གཅོ་ཚང་དགོན་གྲོང་རྡལ།	gco tshang dgon grong rdal	513224101
Qingyun Town (Dosam)	青云镇	Qīngyún Zhèn	རྡོ་ཟམ་གྲོང་རྡལ།	rdo zam grong rdal	513224102
Mugê Town (Mao'ergai)	毛儿盖镇	Máo'érgài Zhèn	དམུ་དགེ་གྲོང་རྡལ།	dmu dge grong rdal	513224103
Zhenjiangguan Town (Zhênjanggoin)	镇江关镇	Zhènjiāngguān Zhèn	ཀྲེན་ཅང་གོན་གྲོང་རྡལ།	kren cang gon grong rdal	513224104
Samar Town (Hongtu)	红土镇	Hóngtǔ Zhèn	ས་དམར་གྲོང་རྡལ།	sa dmar grong rdal	513224105
Xiaohe Town (Xaoho)	小河镇	Xiǎohé Zhèn	ཞའོ་ཧོ་གྲོང་རྡལ།	zhavo ho grong rdal	513224106
Townships
Anhong Township (Pagta)	安宏乡	Ānhóng Xiāng	ཕག་མཐའ་ཡུལ་ཚོ།	phag mthav yul tsho	513224203
Zhenping Township (Zhoinpain)	镇坪乡	Zhènpíng Xiāng	ཀྲོན་ཕན་ཡུལ་ཚོ།	kron phan yul tsho	513224207
Minjiang Township (Mainjang)	岷江乡	Mínjiāng Xiāng	མན་ཅང་ཡུལ་ཚོ།	man cang yul tsho	513224208
Daxing Township (Daxin)	大姓乡	Dàxìng Xiāng	དཱ་ཞིན་ཡུལ་ཚོ།	dā zhin yul tsho	513224209
Baiyang Township (Paiyang)	白羊乡	Báiyáng Xiāng	བད་ཡངས་ཡུལ་ཚོ།	bad yangs yul tsho	513224210
Xiaoxing Township (Xaoxin)	小姓乡	Xiǎoxìng Xiāng	ཞའོ་ཞིན་ཡུལ་ཚོ།	zhavo zhin yul tsho	513224213
Xainyü Township (Yanyun)	燕云乡	Yànyún Xiāng	གཞན་ཡུལ་ཡུལ་ཚོ།	gzhan yul yul tsho	513224214
Huanglong Township (Sêrco)	黄龙乡	Huánglóng Xiāng	གསེར་མཚོ་ཡུལ་ཚོ།	gser mtsho yul tsho	513224219
Mangbai Township (Xiabazhai)	下八寨乡	Xiàbāzhài Xiāng	སྨང་པའི་ཡུལ་ཚོ།	smang pavi yul tsho	513224221
Ethnic Township
Shili Hui Ethnic Township (Junang)	十里回族乡	Shílǐ Huízú Xiāng	བཅུ་ནང་ཧུའེ་རིགས་ཡུལ་ཚོ།	bcu nang huve rigs yul tsho	513224201
Other divisions
Songpan Forestry Bureau	松潘林业局	Sōngpān Línyèjú	ཟུང་ཆུ་ནགས་ལས་ཅུས།	zung chu nags las cus	513224401

== Transport ==
- China National Highway 213
- Jiuzhai Huanglong Airport

== See also ==
- Jiandi Dao
- 1976 Songpan-Pingwu earthquake

== Gallery ==
Street peddlers in Songpan, 2002

Street peddlers in Songpan, 2002

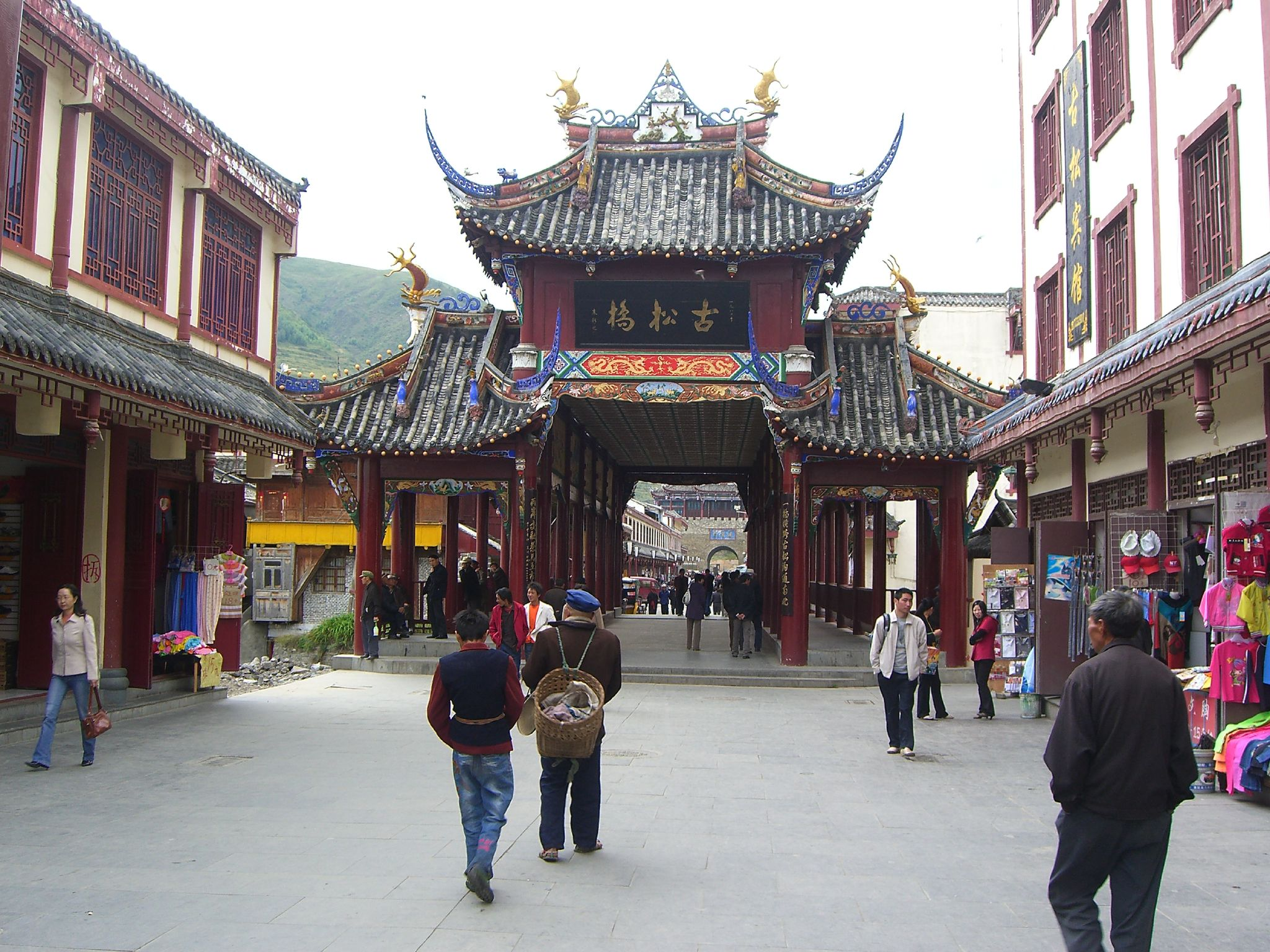
Songpan Bridge
