= Noji =

Noji is a surname. Notable people with the surname include:

- Józef Noji (1909–1943), Polish long-distance runner
- Minae Noji (born 1973), Japanese-American actress
- Rick Noji (born 1967), American high jumper
