= Chinese frigate Yingtan =

Type 053K frigate

Coordinates: 36.0546303°N 120.3210161°E

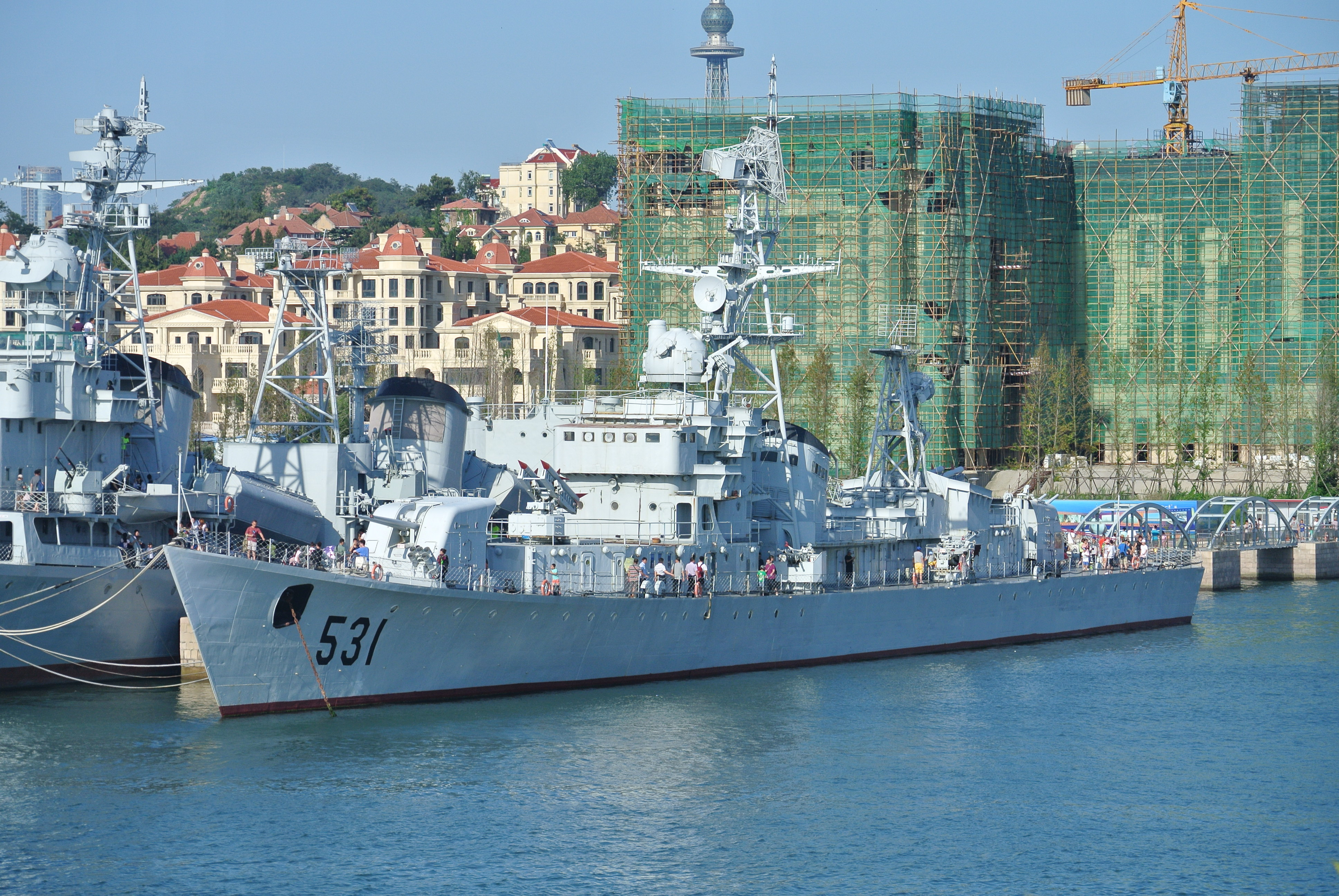
- Yingtan as a museum ship in Qingdao.

History

China
- Name: Yingtan; (鹰潭)
- Namesake: Yingtan
- Builder: Hudong Shipyard, Shanghai
- Laid down: 1970
- Launched: 1971
- Commissioned: December 1974
- Decommissioned: 1994
- Identification: Pennant number: 531
- Status: Museum ship at the Chinese Navy Museum, Qingdao

General characteristics
- Class & type: Type 053K frigate
- Displacement: 1,700 standard; 2,000 full load
- Length: 103.2 m (339 ft)
- Beam: 10.2 m (33 ft)
- Draft: 3.1 m (10 ft)
- Propulsion: 2 x SEMT Pielstick 12PA6 diesels; 16,000 shaft horsepower (12,000 kW); 2 shafts
- Speed: 26 knots
- Range: 4,000 nmi (7,400 km; 4,600 mi) at 15 knots (28 km/h; 17 mph)
- Complement: 185
- Sensors & processing systems: Radar; Type 381 air search; Square Tie surface search; Fin Curve navigation; Sun Visor 8 fire control; 2 x Fog Lamp fire control; Type 341 fire control; Sonar; Pegas-2M active hull-mounted; Tamir 2 active hull-mounted
- Electronic warfare & decoys: 2 x Jug Pair ESM
- Armament: 2 × 3.9 in (100 mm)/56 (twin) guns; 4 × 37 mm/63 twin guns; 2 x HQ-61 SAM twin launchers; 2 x BMB-2 depth charge projectors; 2 x depth charge racks; 2 x RBU-1200 ASW rocket launchers

Yingtan (531) was the sole Type 053K (NATO reporting name: Jiangdong) frigate constructed by the People's Republic of China for the People's Liberation Army Navy (PLAN). She was equipped with HQ-61 surface-to-air missiles (SAM) and the Type 381 radar, making her the first PLAN ship equipped with either surface-to-air missiles or modern air search radar.

Yingtan formally entered service in 1974, but was only named on 1 August 1986. She participated in the Johnson South Reef Skirmish in 1988. The frigate retired in 1994 and became a museum ship at the Chinese Navy Museum in Qingdao.

A sister ship was being constructed at the Qiuxin Shipyard by 1979 but was not completed.

== Gallery ==
The forward HQ-61 SAM launcher.

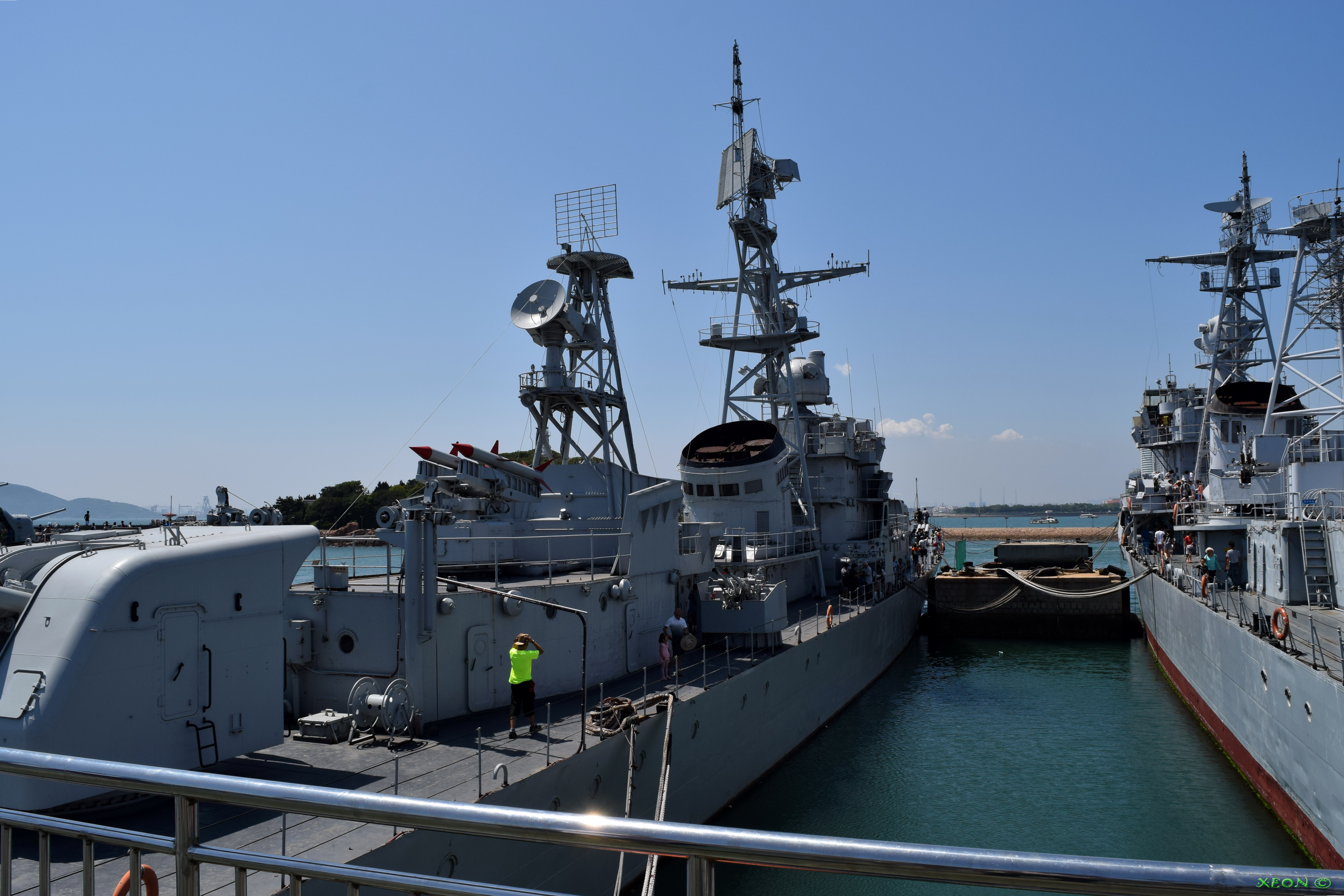
The rear HQ-61 SAM launcher.

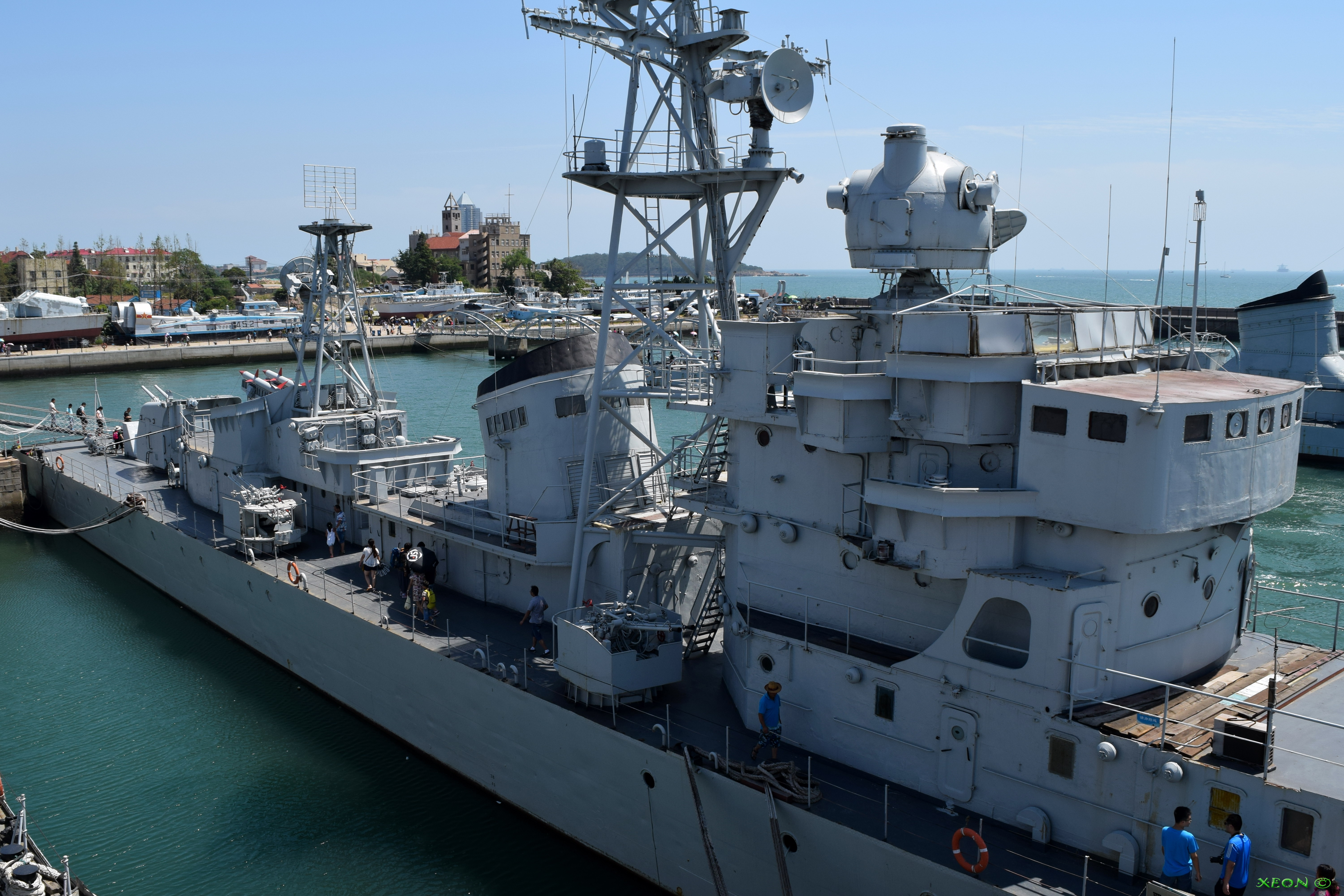
The forward superstructure with the Sun Visor 8 fire control radar atop the bridge.
