= Xiaoba =

Xiaoba may refer to these locations in China:

- Xiaoba Township (小坝乡), a township in Huidong County, Sichuan
- Xiaoba Subdistrict (肖坝街道), a subdistrict of Shizhong District, Leshan, Sichuan

== Towns ==
- Xiaoba, Guizhou (小坝), in Bijie, Guizhou
- Xiaoba, Ningxia (小坝), in Qingtongxia, Ningxia
- Xiaoba, Anzhou District (晓坝), in Anzhou District, Mianyang, Sichuan
- Xiaoba, Beichuan County (小坝), in Beichuan Qiang Autonomous County, Mianyang, Sichuan
