= Yumin =

Yumin (Chinese: 裕民 unless otherwise noted) may refer to these places in China:

- Yumin County, a county in northern Xinjiang
- Yumin Township (育民乡), a township in Yushu, Jilin
- Yumin, Sichuan, a town in Yuechi County, Sichuan

== Subdistricts ==
- Yumin Subdistrict, Harbin, in Hulan District, Harbin, Heilongjiang
- Yumin Subdistrict, Qingtongxia, in Qingtongxia, Ningxia

== Name ==
- Zheng Yumin (born 1967), Chinese badminton player
- Yumin Abbadini (born 2001), Italian gymnast

== See also ==
- Yu Min (disambiguation)
