= Tangjiashan =

Tangjiashan may refer to:

- Mount Tangjia, mountain in Sichuan, China
- Tangjiashan Lake, landslide dam-created lake formed by the 2008 Sichuan earthquake
