= Yongchang =

Yongchang is the transliteration of various Chinese names:

== 永昌 Yǒngchāng ==
=== Locations in China ===
- Yongchang County, a county in Jinchang, Gansu
- Baoshan, Yunnan, a city in Yunnan, formerly known as Yongchang

==== Subdistricts ====
- Yongchang Subdistrict (永昌街道), a subdistrict of Qidong County in Hunan.
- Yongchang Subdistrict, Dandong (永昌街道), a subdistrict of Zhenxing District in Dandong prefecture-level city, Liaoning.
- Yongchang Subdistrict, Changchun, a subdistrict in Chaoyang District, Changchun, Jilin
- Yongchang Subdistrict, Lanxi, a subdistrict in Lanxi, Zhejiang
- Yongchang Subdistrict, Chengwu County, a subdistrict in Chengwu County, Shandong
- Yongchang Subdistrict, Kunming, a subdistrict in Kunming, Yunnan
- Yongchang Subdistrict, Baoshan, Yunnan, a subdistrict in Baoshan, Yunnan

==== Towns ====
- Yongchang, Hangzhou, a town in Hangzhou, Zhejiang
- Yongchang, Sichuan, a town in Beichuan Qiang Autonomous County, Sichuan
- Yongchang, Wuwei, Gansu, a town in Wuwei, Gansu

==== Historical ====
- Yongchang Commandery, an imperial Chinese commandery

=== Historical eras ===
- Yongchang (322–323), era name used by Emperor Yuan of Jin
- Yongchang (689), era name used by Emperor Ruizong of Tang
- Yongchang (1644–1645), era name used by Li Zicheng

== 永常 Yǒng Cháng ==
- Yong Chang (general) (died 1755) Qing military general.
