= Weizhou Grand Mosque =

Mosque in Wuzhong, Ningxia, China

- 韦州清真大寺
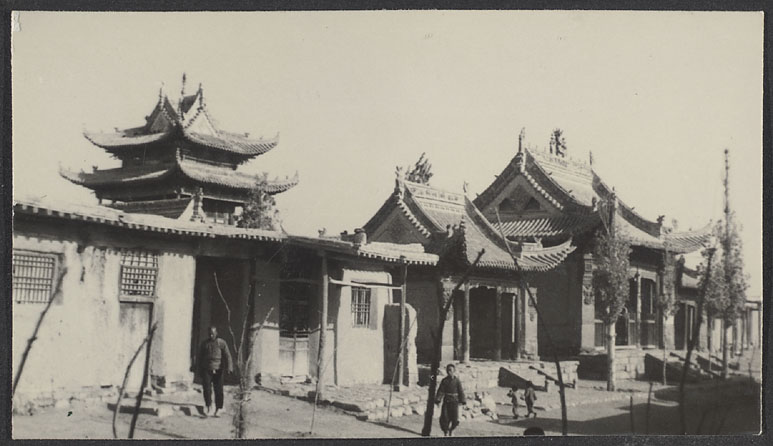
- The entrance and minaret of the old Weizhou mosque during the 1930s

Religion
- Affiliation: Sunni Islam
- Ecclesiastical or organizational status: Mosque
- Status: Active

Location
- Location: Wuzhong, Ningxia
- Country: China

Architecture
- Type: Mosque

Chinese name
- Simplified Chinese: 韦州清真大寺
- Traditional Chinese: 韋州清真大寺
Transcriptions
Standard Mandarin
- Hanyu Pinyin: Wéizhōu Qīngzhēndàsì

The Weizhou Grand Mosque (simplified Chinese: 韦州清真大寺; traditional Chinese: 韋州清真大寺; pinyin: Wéizhōu Qīngzhēndàsì) is a mosque in Tongxin County, Wuzhong City, in the Ningxia Hui Autonomous Region of China. Plans to demolish the mosque led to widespread protests in 2018 and 2019.

== History ==
Weizhou's old mosque was constructed during the Ming Dynasty in the traditional Chinese palatial style. The mosque was expanded and renovated three times during the Qing dynasty and the Republican era. It was named by the American Episcopal missionary Charles L. Pickens, Jr., who traveled to western China in the 1920s-1930s. He documented many places and peoples and remarked the place as "one of the most beautiful in all China."

The mosque was destroyed during the Cultural Revolution in the 1960s.

=== Reconstruction and proposed demolition ===
Reconstruction began in 2015, with plans approved by local authorities. After the renovation was finished, the scale of the mosque was bigger than the standards. Chinese officials claimed that the mosque was expanded beyond the plans approved, in an Islamic rather than Chinese architectural style.

On 3 August 2018 Ningxia officials stated that the mosque would be forcibly demolished within days because the appropriate permits were not issued, before construction. Local officials were criticized by the Commission for Discipline Inspection of Wuzhong City in May for their lack of supervision during the mosque's renovations.

A local Chinese Communist Party document mentioned that the Weizhou Grand Mosque had to be demolished since it was carrying out illegal extensions since 2016. Officials in the town were saying the mosque had not been given proper building permits, because it is built in the Middle Eastern architectural style. The residents were alarmed by this and helped stopped the destruction of the mosque.

=== Incident ===
According to Reuters, the Ningxia officials' "forcibly demolished" notice was shared online among the ethnic Hui Muslim community and, in a rare demonstration against the Chinese government, thousands of ethnic Hui Muslims had gathered at the mosque location to protest its planned demolition. However, shared videos on social media showed large crowds gathered outside the Grand Mosque in the town of Weizhou to protect it. The Hui are the largest of the 10 Muslim minority groups within China, and speak a variation of Mandarin—the language spoken by China's majority Han ethnic group.

According to the Hong Kong–based South China Morning Post, the main question of protesters was: "why the authorities had not stopped construction of the mosque during its two years of construction, if it had not been granted relevant permits?"

An official from the local Islamic Association told Reuters that the mosque would not be demolished entirely; only fixes on the building structure were to be made. The Associated Press news agency reported that the Muslim community would not accept this proposal. Documents show that Hui protesters grouped at the Weizhou mosque and carried Chinese national flags that expressed support for the Communist Party.

=== Reactions ===
Stephen McDonell, the BBC's China correspondent, reported: "For centuries Hui Muslim mosques were built in a more Chinese style, but the local government considered the Grand Mosque in the town of Weizhou as an example of a growing Arabic architecture between Chinese Muslim."

According to ABC News, many Weibo users in China were agreeing with the pulling down of the mosque.

A group of American lawmakers publicly asked the United States government to engage in more sanctions on Xinjiang, especially against key Chinese officials and politicians who had a role in demolishing the mosque.

== See also ==
- Islam in China
- List of mosques in China
- Islamophobia in China
