= Lanzhou–Chengdu–Chongqing Pipeline =

Petroleum product pipeline in China

Location
- Country: China
- Direction: North–south
- Start: Lanzhou
- Passes through: Gansu; Shaanxi; Sichuan
- To: Chongqing

General information
- Type: Oil products
- Owner: PetroChina
- Commissioned: 2002

Technical information
- Length: 1,250 km (780 mi)
- Maximum discharge: 6 million tonnes per year
- Diameter: 508 mm (20 in)

The Lanzhou–Chengdu–Chongqing Pipeline is a petroleum product pipeline in China. The pipeline is owned by PetroChina.

The 1,250-kilometre (777 mi) pipeline starts at the Lanzhou terminal and finish at the Chongqing terminal. It runs through Gansu, Shaanxi and Sichuan provinces. Its diameter varies from 508 millimetres (20 in) to 457 millimetres (18 in) to 323.9 millimetres (12.75 in). The pipeline has capacity over 6 million tonnes of oil products per year. The pipeline cost around US$500 million.

After the 2008 Sichuan earthquake the pipeline was temporarily closed due to risk of flooding as the pipeline is located 60 kilometres (37 mi) downstream from Tangjiashan Lake.
