= Tongxin Great Mosque =

Mosque in Wuzhong, Ningxia, China

- 同心清真大寺
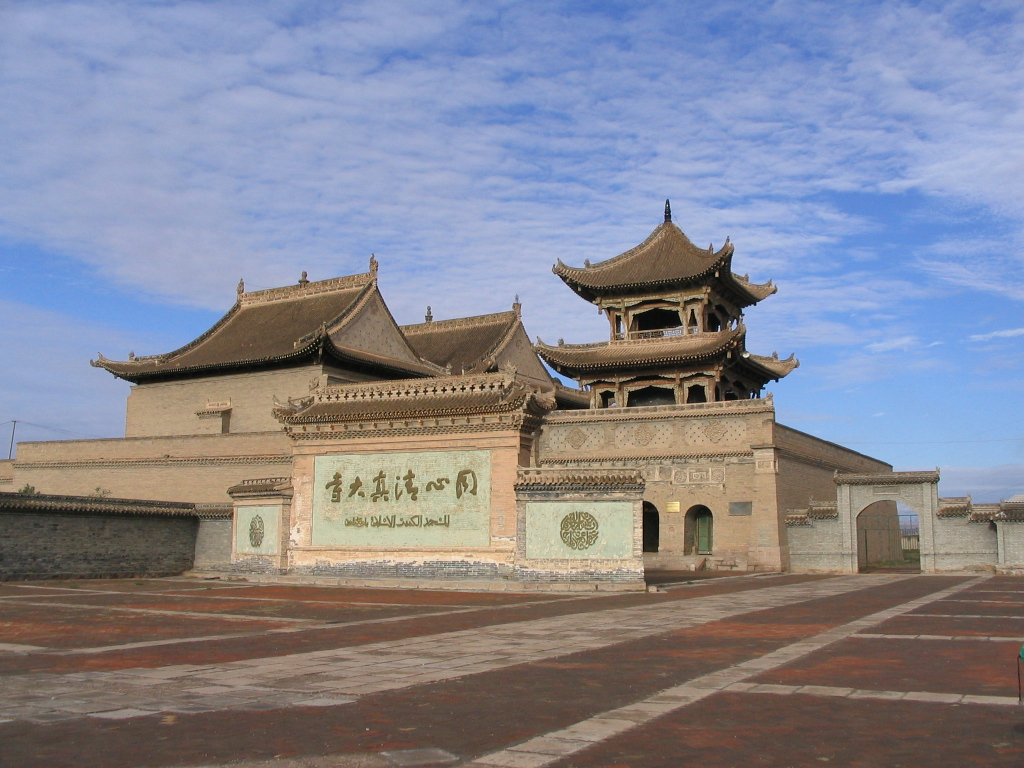

- Location of the mosque in Ningxia

Religion
- Affiliation: Sunni Islam
- Sect: Yihewani
- Ecclesiastical or organizational status: Mosque
- Status: Active

Location
- Location: Tongxin, Wuzhong, Ningxia
- Country: China
- Interactive map of Tongxin Great Mosque
- Coordinates: 36°57′54″N 105°54′40″E

Architecture
- Type: Mosque
- Style: Chinese; Islamic
- Completed: c. 14th century
- Capacity: 1,000 worshipers

Major cultural heritage sites under national-level protection
- Official name: Tongxin Great Mosque 同心清真大寺
- Type: Cultural
- Criteria: Religion
- Reference no.: 3-136

Chinese name
- Simplified Chinese: 同心清真大寺
Transcriptions
Standard Mandarin
- Hanyu Pinyin: Tóngxīn Qīngzhēndàsì

The Tongxin Great Mosque (Chinese: 同心清真大寺; pinyin: Tóngxīn Qīngzhēndàsì) is a mosque in Tongxin County, Wuzhong City, in the Ningxia Hui Autonomous Region of China. The mosque is the oldest and largest mosque in Ningxia.

The mosque is listed as a Chinese major cultural heritage site.

== History ==
The mosque was likely built in the fourteenth century during the Yuan dynasty. It was originally a Mongolian Buddhist temple that was eventually abandoned after the fall of the Yuan dynasty in 1368. It was reconsecrated as a mosque during the early Ming dynasty. The mosque underwent major renovations in the sixteenth century, in 1791 and in 1907. The mosque was further expanded in 1936. When the Chinese Workers' and Peasants' Red Army went on a westward campaign in 1936 moving into Ningxia, they held a meeting with the local people at the mosque. They also set up the Yuhai County People's Government in Shanganning. In 1983, it was recognized as the National Key Cultural Relics Protection Unit by the State Council. Today, the mosque is affiliated with the Yihewani sect.

== Architecture ==
The mosque was built in the Chinese Han style and decorated in Islamic style, which showcase the combination of Han and Hui culture. All of the buildings were built on a cyan platform, seven metres (twenty-three feet) high. At the front gate there is an imitation-timber work entrance wall, decorated with brick carvings. The main building, consisting of the main prayer hall and two connecting halls, accommodates 1,000 worshipers. Behind the mosque lies a cemetery which also contains the shrines of two Sufi saints (or Shaykhs).

== Transportation ==
The mosque is accessible by bus from the Yinchuan Railway Station.

== See also ==
- Islam in China
- List of mosques in China
- List of Major National Historical and Cultural Sites in Ningxia
