= Daba, Ningxia =

Daba 大坝镇
- Town
- Location in Ningxia
- Coordinates: 37°59′9″N 106°1′18″E
- Country: People's Republic of China
- Autonomous region: Ningxia
- Prefecture-level city: Wuzhong
- County-level city: Qingtongxia
- Time zone: UTC+8 (China Standard)

Daba (simplified Chinese: 大坝; traditional Chinese: 大垻; pinyin: Dàbà) is a town under the administration of Qingtongxia, Ningxia, China. As of 2020, it administers Dianchang (电厂) Residential Neighborhood and the following 15 villages:

- Daba Village
- Weiqiao Village (韦桥村)
- Shamiao Village (沙庙村)
- Limin Village (利民村)
- Chenjun Village (陈俊村)
- Jiangdong Village (蒋东村)
- Jiangnan Village (蒋南村)
- Xinqiao Village (新桥村)
- Lixin Village (立新村)
- Sankeshu Village (三棵树村)
- Huashigou Village (滑石沟村)
- Wanglaotan Village (王老滩村)
- Shangtan Village (上滩村)
- Zhongzhuang Village (中庄村)
- Zhongtan Village (中滩村)
