= Yu Min =

Yu Min may refer to:

- Yu Min (physicist) (1926–2019), Chinese nuclear physicist
- Yu Min (linguist) (1916–1995), Chinese linguist
- Yuko Fueki (born 1979), Japanese actress known in South Korea as Yu Min

== See also ==
- Yumin (disambiguation)
