= Xiakou, Ningxia =

Xiakou 峡口镇
- Town
- Location in Ningxia
- Coordinates: 37°53′38″N 106°4′41″E
- Country: People's Republic of China
- Autonomous region: Ningxia
- Prefecture-level city: Wuzhong
- County-level city: Qingtongxia
- Time zone: UTC+8 (China Standard)

Xiakou (simplified Chinese: 峡口; traditional Chinese: 峽口; pinyin: Xiákǒu) is a town under the administration of Qingtongxia, Ningxia, China. As of 2018, it has 13 villages under its administration.
