= Hongsibu Solar Park =

Photovoltaic power station in Ningxia, China

Hongsibao Solar Park
- Country: China
- Location: Hongsibu District, Wuzhong, Ningxia
- Coordinates: 37°18′12″N 105°57′07″E
- Status: Operational

Solar farm
- Type: Flat-panel PV

Power generation
- Nameplate capacity: 50 MW

The Hongsibao Solar Park is a 50 MWp photovoltaic power station located in Ningxia Hui Autonomous Region, China. Most of it uses fixed tilt arrays, but a 2 MW tracker section was completed in 2011. The first stage, 20 MWp, was completed in 2010.

== See also ==
- List of photovoltaic power stations
- Photovoltaic power station
- Photovoltaics
