= Yushu, Jilin =

Yushu 榆树市 Yü-shu
- County-level city
- Location in Jilin
- Coordinates: 44°49′34″N 126°33′00″E
- Country: People's Republic of China
- Province: Jilin
- Sub-provincial city: Changchun

Area
  - County-level city: 4,724 km^{2} (1,824 sq mi)
  - Urban: 109.00 km^{2} (42.09 sq mi)

Population (2010)
  - County-level city: 1,160,568
  - Estimate (2017): 1,439,000
  - Density: 245.7/km^{2} (636.3/sq mi)
  - Urban: 296,500
- Time zone: UTC+8 (China Standard)
- Postal code: 1304XX

Yushu (simplified Chinese: 榆树; traditional Chinese: 榆樹; pinyin: Yúshù) is a county-level city of Jilin Province, Northeast China. It is under the administration of the prefecture-level city of Changchun, capital of Jilin. It is more than 140 kilometres (87 mi) to the northeast of central Changchun, and around 100 kilometres (62 mi) south of Harbin. The name of the place means "Elm Tree". The northernmost county-level division of Changchun, it borders Dehui to the southwest as well as the prefecture-level division of Harbin (capital of Heilongjiang) to the northeast.

== Administrative divisions ==
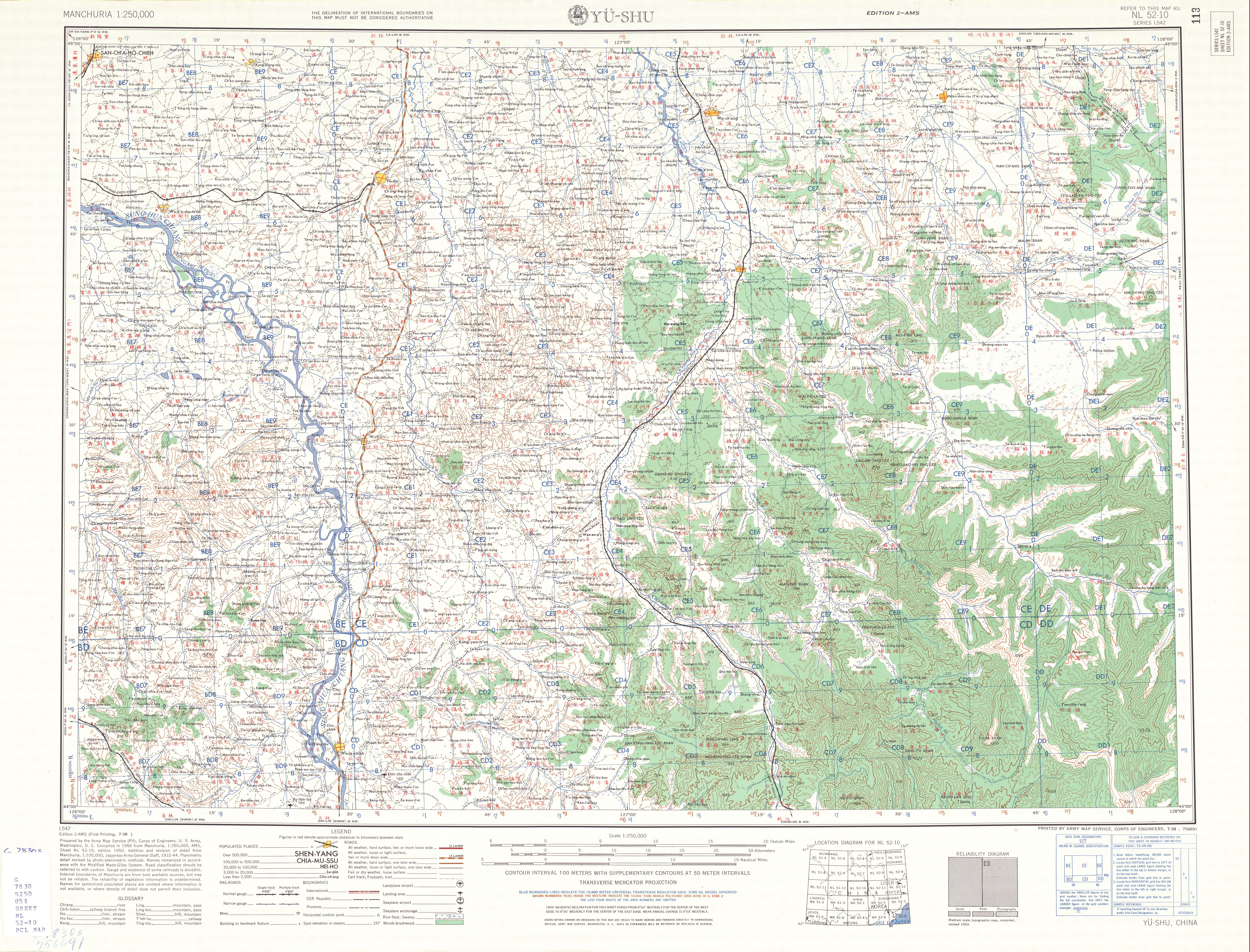
Map including Yushu (labeled as Yü-shu 榆樹) (AMS, 1956)

There are four subdistricts, 16 towns, 20 townships, and one ethnic township under jurisdiction of Yushu.

Subdistricts:

- Huachang Subdistrict (华昌街道), Zhenyang Subdistrict (正阳街道), Peiying Subdistrict (培英街道), Chengjiao Subdistrict (城郊街道)

Towns:

- Sihe (泗河镇), Daling (大岭镇), Dapo (大坡镇), Huaijia (怀家镇), Tuqiao (土桥镇), Xinli (新立镇), Heilin (黑林镇), Wukeshu (五棵树镇), Minjia (闵家镇), Xiangyang (向阳镇), Gongpeng (弓棚镇), Baoshou (保寿镇), Xiushui (秀水镇), Liujia (刘家镇), Bahao (八号镇), Xinzhuang (新庄镇)

Townships:

- Huancheng Township (环城乡), Chengfa Township (城发乡), Lihe Township (李合乡), Yujia Township (于家乡), Qingding Township (青顶乡), Shisihu Township (十四户乡), Guangming Township (光明乡), Xiejia Township (谢家乡), Fu'an Township (福安乡), Dayu Township (大于乡), Xuanfeng Township (先锋乡), Qianjin Township (前进乡), Wulong Township (武龙乡), Dagang Township (大岗乡), Shuangjing Township (双井乡), Hongxing Township (红星乡), Siyu Township (恩育乡), Tai'an Township (太安乡), Yumin Township (育民乡), Qingshan Township (青山乡), Yanhe Korean Ethnic Township (延和朝鲜族乡)

== Climate ==
Climate data for Yushu, elevation 197 m (646 ft), (1991–2020 normals, extremes 1971–present)
Month	Jan	Feb	Mar	Apr	May	Jun	Jul	Aug	Sep	Oct	Nov	Dec	Year
Record high °C (°F)	3.1 (37.6)	10.0 (50.0)	20.0 (68.0)	29.3 (84.7)	35.2 (95.4)	38.3 (100.9)	35.7 (96.3)	35.0 (95.0)	30.4 (86.7)	27.9 (82.2)	19.8 (67.6)	9.9 (49.8)	38.3 (100.9)
Mean daily maximum °C (°F)	−11.4 (11.5)	−5.6 (21.9)	3.3 (37.9)	14.2 (57.6)	21.6 (70.9)	26.3 (79.3)	27.8 (82.0)	26.5 (79.7)	21.8 (71.2)	13.0 (55.4)	0.6 (33.1)	−9.1 (15.6)	10.8 (51.3)
Daily mean °C (°F)	−17.0 (1.4)	−11.7 (10.9)	−2.5 (27.5)	7.9 (46.2)	15.5 (59.9)	20.9 (69.6)	23.1 (73.6)	21.5 (70.7)	15.4 (59.7)	6.8 (44.2)	−4.5 (23.9)	−14.2 (6.4)	5.1 (41.2)
Mean daily minimum °C (°F)	−22.1 (−7.8)	−17.5 (0.5)	−8.2 (17.2)	1.6 (34.9)	9.4 (48.9)	15.6 (60.1)	18.7 (65.7)	16.9 (62.4)	9.6 (49.3)	1.3 (34.3)	−9.2 (15.4)	−19.0 (−2.2)	−0.2 (31.6)
Record low °C (°F)	−35.5 (−31.9)	−36.7 (−34.1)	−23.3 (−9.9)	−11.9 (10.6)	−3.8 (25.2)	4.8 (40.6)	9.8 (49.6)	8.3 (46.9)	−2.4 (27.7)	−14.2 (6.4)	−26.4 (−15.5)	−35.6 (−32.1)	−36.7 (−34.1)
Average precipitation mm (inches)	4.8 (0.19)	5.1 (0.20)	12.7 (0.50)	23.5 (0.93)	58.9 (2.32)	95.6 (3.76)	141.6 (5.57)	116.1 (4.57)	53.7 (2.11)	26.8 (1.06)	17.3 (0.68)	9.3 (0.37)	565.4 (22.26)
Average precipitation days (≥ 0.1 mm)	5.7	4.4	6.2	7.3	11.6	13.6	14.2	12.8	9.2	7.9	7.1	7.4	107.4
Average snowy days	7.7	6.0	7.4	2.7	0.2	0	0	0	0	1.9	7.4	9.9	43.2
Average relative humidity (%)	69	63	56	48	53	65	78	80	70	61	65	70	65
Mean monthly sunshine hours	171.1	196.7	229.8	229.4	247.6	249.1	231.8	224.9	229.8	195.6	157.6	149.5	2,512.9
Percentage possible sunshine	60	66	62	56	54	54	50	52	62	58	56	55	57
Source: China Meteorological Administration All-time Oct extreme
