= Hongsibu, Wuzhong =

Hongsibu District 红寺堡区 Hongsipu District
- District
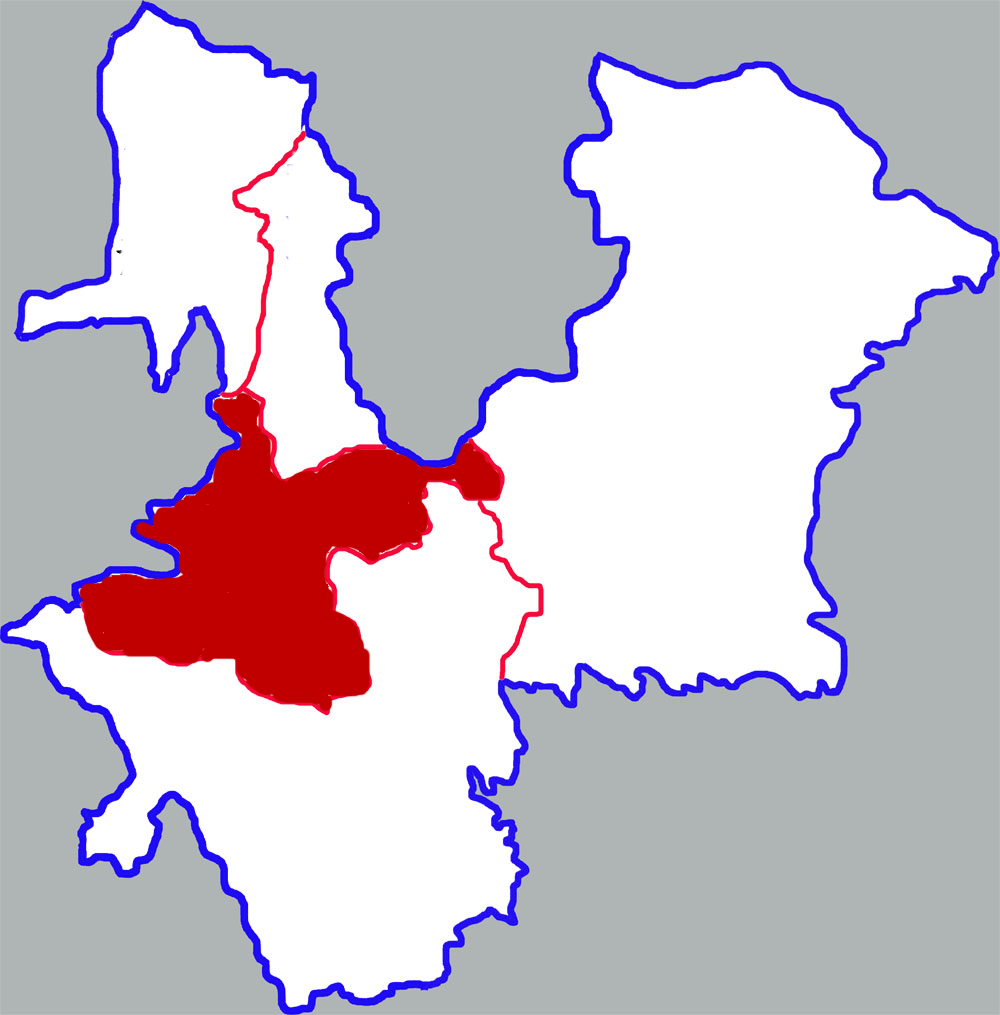
- Hongsibu District in Wuzhong, Ningxia

- Location in Ningxia
- Coordinates: 37.317°N 106.101°E
- Country: China
- Region: Ningxia
- Prefecture-level city: Wuzhong
- Established: 2009
- Seat: Hongsibu Town

Government
  - Secretary: Zhao Zhifeng (赵志锋)
  - Governor: Yang Wenfu (杨文福)

Area
  - District: 3,523.09 km^{2} (1,360.27 sq mi)
- Highest elevation: 1,450 m (4,760 ft)
- Lowest elevation: 1,240 m (4,070 ft)

Population (2020 Census)
  - District: 197,604
  - Density: 56.0883/km^{2} (145.268/sq mi)
  - Urban: 79,198
  - Rural: 118,406
- Time zone: UTC+8 (China Standard)
- Postal code: 751900
- Area code: 0953
- Website: Official website

Hongsibu District (simplified Chinese: 红寺堡区; traditional Chinese: 紅寺堡區; pinyin: Hóngsìbǔ Qū (official), Hóngsìpǔ Qū (local)) is a district within the prefecture-level city of Wuzhong in the autonomous region of Ningxia, China.

== Geography ==
Hongsibu is located 127 kilometres (79 mi) south of the regional capital Yinchuan. It covers an area of 3,523.09 square kilometres (1,360.27 sq mi) in a basin bounded by Mount Niushou (牛首山, 1,774 m (5,820 ft)) in the north, Mount Yantong (烟筒山, 1,715 m (5,627 ft)) in the west and Mount Luo (罗山, 2,624 m (8,609 ft)) in the east; the last has been designated a National Nature Reserve. The terrain is higher in the south than the north and the elevation generally ranges between 1240 and 1450 m above sea level.

== History ==
Hongsibu first appears as a place name during the Ming dynasty.

Beginning in 1998, the area now comprising the district was chosen as a resettlement location for over 200,000 people from drought-stricken areas of southern Ningxia. In the most ambitious scheme of its kind in China, water was diverted from the Yellow River to create and irrigate 60 square kilometres (23 sq mi) of new agricultural land. The administrative district was established in 2009.

== Administration ==
Hongsibu District is divided into 1 subdistrict, 2 towns and 3 townships: Xinmin Subdistrict (新民街道), Hongsibu Town (红寺堡镇), Taiyangshan Town (太阳山镇), Xinzhuangji Township (新庄集乡), Dahe Township (大河乡) and Liuquan Township (柳泉乡), the last of which was created in 2014 from the western part of Xinzhuangji.

== Demographics ==
At the end of 2020 the population of Hongsibu District was 197,604, of which 40.1% lived in urban areas. The district recorded a population of 165,016 in the 2010 national census It was 51,875 in the 2000 census. 61% of the population is Hui.

== Economy ==
Hongsibu District's gross domestic product was estimated at CN¥1.56 billion in 2015.

== Infrastructure ==
The Dingbian–Wuwei, Fuzhou–Yinchuan, and Gunquan-Hongsibu (formerly S19, now signed as G6) expressways run through the northern part of the district, as does the Taiyuan–Zhongwei–Yinchuan Railway. The Hongsibu Solar Park is located in the district.
