= Litong, Wuzhong =

Litong 利通区 لِ‌طْو ٿِيُوِ
- District
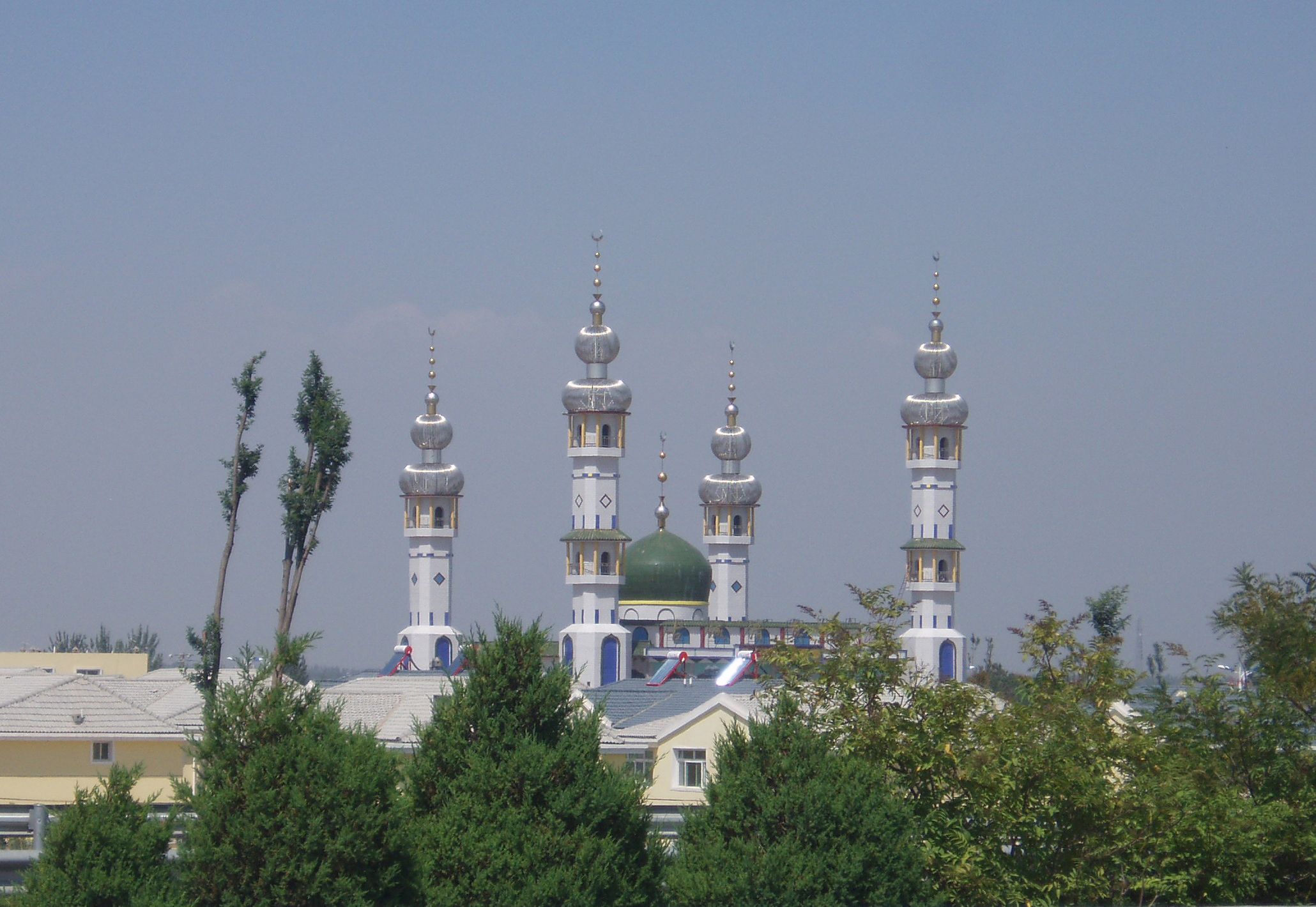
- A mosque in Wuzhong

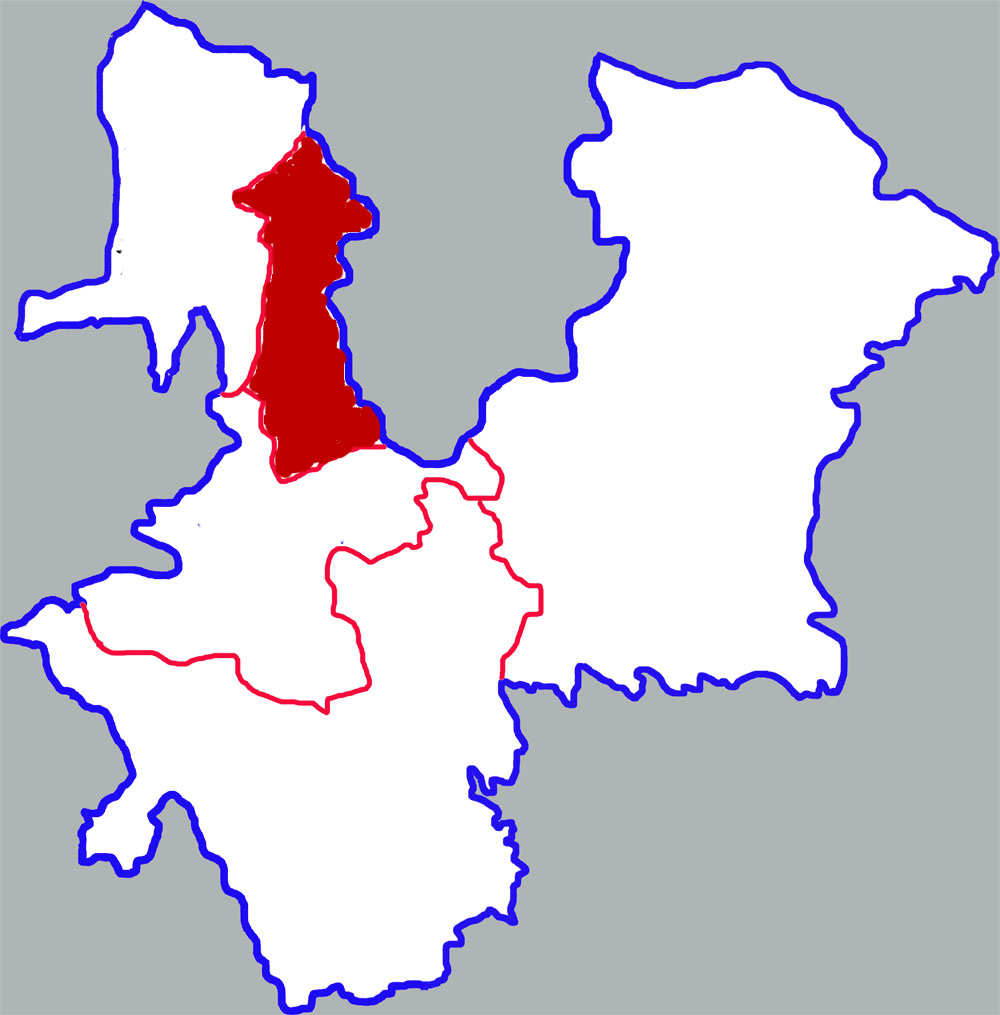
- Location of Litong in Wuzhong

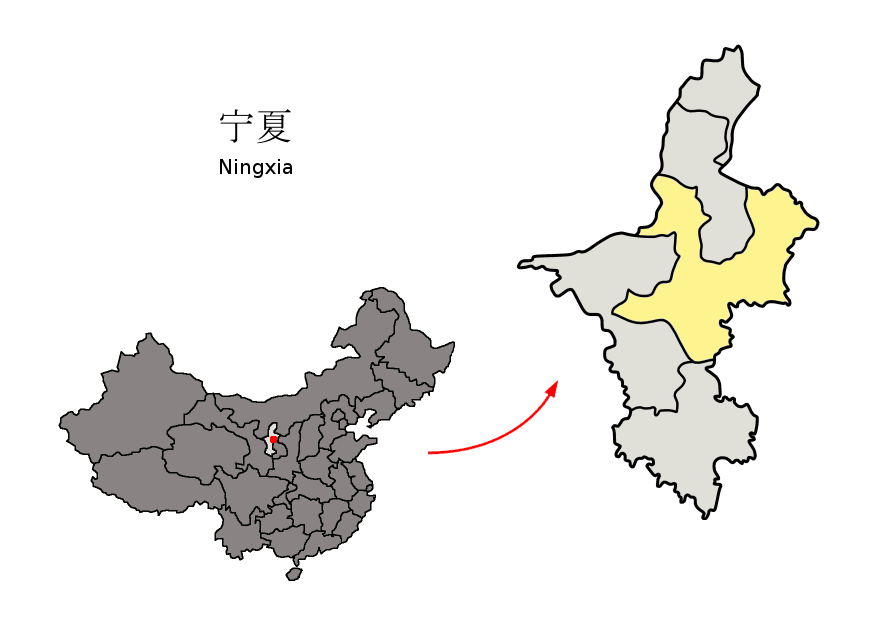
- Wuzhong in Ningxia
- Coordinates (city government): 38°00′N 106°12′E
- Country: China
- Autonomous region: Ningxia
- Prefecture-level City: Wuzhong
- District seat: Jinxing Town

Area
  - Total: 1,106.67 km^{2} (427.29 sq mi)

Population (2020 census)
  - Total: 460,790
  - Density: 416.38/km^{2} (1,078.4/sq mi)
- Time zone: UTC+8 (China Standard)
- Website: www.ltq.gov.cn

Litong District (simplified Chinese: 利通区; traditional Chinese: 利通區; pinyin: Lìtōng Qū; Wade–Giles: Li-t’ung Ch’ü, Xiao'erjing: لِ‌طْو ٿِيُوِ) is one of two districts and the seat of the city of Wuzhong in the Ningxia Hui Autonomous Region of China. It has a total area of 1,112 square kilometres (429 sq mi), and a population of approximately 350,000 people (2003).

Litong District includes Wuzhong's main urban area, and therefore is usually not marked separately on less-detailed maps, which simply mark the location as "Wuzhong".

== Characteristics ==
Situated on the bank of the Yellow River, Litong District is well known for its agricultural products. Rice paddy products are the most famous. Beginning in 1998, the district's irrigation office and Hohai University teamed up to research the applications of the high-yielding irrigation techniques employed in the district's rice paddies. The district's postal code is 751100.

== Administrative units ==
Since the last administrative reorganization (2007), Litong District has been divided into 4 township-level units, namely eight towns and 4 townships.

Eight towns:

- Gucheng Town (古城镇, قُ‌چٍْ جٍ)
- Shangqiao Town (上桥镇, شَانْ‌ٿِيَوْ جٍ)
- Shengli Town (胜利镇, شٍْ‌لِ جٍ)
- Jinxing Town (金星镇, ڭٍ‌ثٍْ جٍ)
- Jinji Town (金积镇, ڭٍ‌ڭِ جٍ) - formerly, Jinjipu (金积堡, ڭٍ‌ڭِ‌بَوْ) 37°56′00″N 106°07′30″E
- Jinyintan Town (金银滩镇, ڭٍ‌يٍ‌تًا جٍ)
- Gaozha Town (高闸镇, قَوْجَا جٍ)
- Biandangou Town (扁担沟镇, بِیًادًاقِوْ جٍ)

Four townships: 38°00′N 106°13′E

- Banqiao Township (板桥乡, بًاٿِيَوْ ثِيَانْ) 37°58′N 106°10′E
- Malianqu Township (马莲渠乡, مَالِيًاٿِيُوِ ثِيَانْ)
- Dongtasi Township (东塔寺乡, دْوتَاسِْ ثِيَانْ) (Just east of downtown Wuzhong): was merged to other.
- Guojiaqiao Township (郭家桥乡, قُوَڭِيَاٿِيَوْ ثِيَانْ) : was merged to other.

There are also special administrative units:

- Balanghu Farm (巴浪湖农场, بَالَانْ خُ نْوچَانْ)
- Sunjiatan Development Area (孙家滩开发区, سٌ‌ڭِيَاتًا کَيْ‌فَا ٿِيُوِ)
