= Mount Tangjia =

Mountain in China

Coordinates: 31°53′00″N 104°25′59″E

Mount Tangjia (唐家山)

Highest point
- Elevation: c. 780 meters (2,560 ft)

Geography
- Location: Sichuan, China

Mount Tangjia (Chinese: 唐家山; pinyin: Tángjiā Shān) is a mountain in Sichuan Province, China, 3.2 kilometers (2.0 mi) away from the county seat of Beichuan County.

It overlooks the Jian River and Tangjiashan Lake, a landslide dam-created lake which was formed by the 2008 Sichuan earthquake.
