= Yumin Subdistrict, Qingtongxia =

Yumin Subdistrict 裕民街道
- Subdistrict
- Location in Ningxia
- Coordinates: 38°0′53″N 106°4′19″E
- Country: People's Republic of China
- Autonomous region: Ningxia
- Prefecture-level city: Wuzhong
- County-level city: Qingtongxia
- Time zone: UTC+8 (China Standard)

Yumin Subdistrict (Chinese: 裕民街道; pinyin: Yùmín Jiēdào) is a subdistrict in Qingtongxia, Ningxia, China. As of 2018, it has eight residential communities under its administration.

== See also ==
- List of township-level divisions of Ningxia
