= Qingtongxia =

Qingtongxia 青铜峡市 · ٿٍْ‌طْوثِيَا شِ
- County-level city
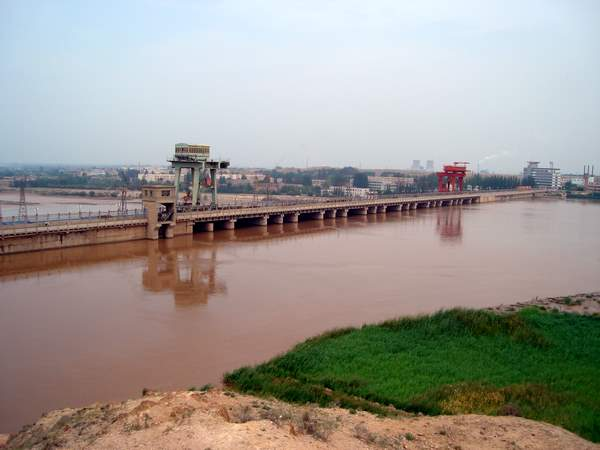

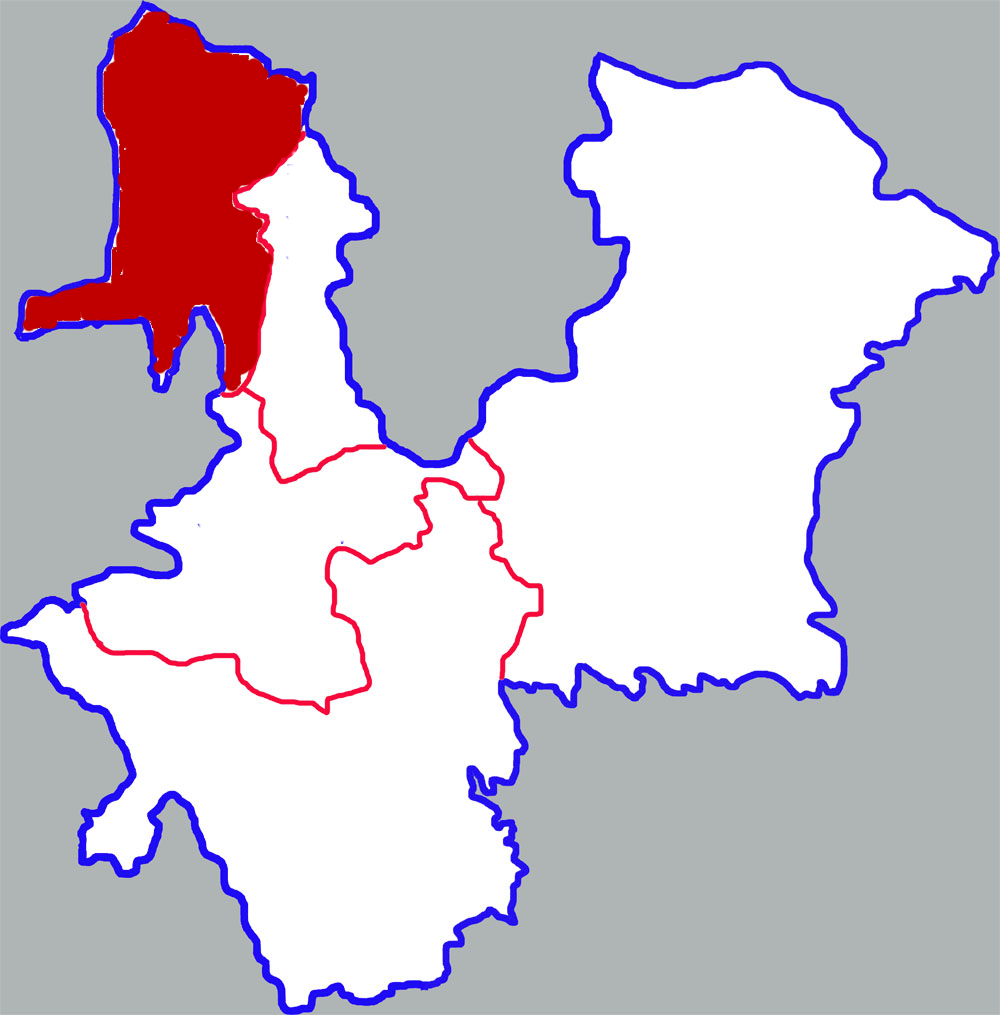
- Location of Qingtongxia in Wuzhong

- Location in Ningxia
- Coordinates: 37°53′06″N 105°59′27″E
- Country: China
- Region: Ningxia
- Prefecture-level city: Wuzhong
- Municipal seat: Yumin Subdistrict

Area
  - Total: 1,907.57 km^{2} (736.52 sq mi)

Population (2010 census)
  - Total: 264,717
  - Density: 138.772/km^{2} (359.417/sq mi)
- Time zone: UTC+8 (China Standard)

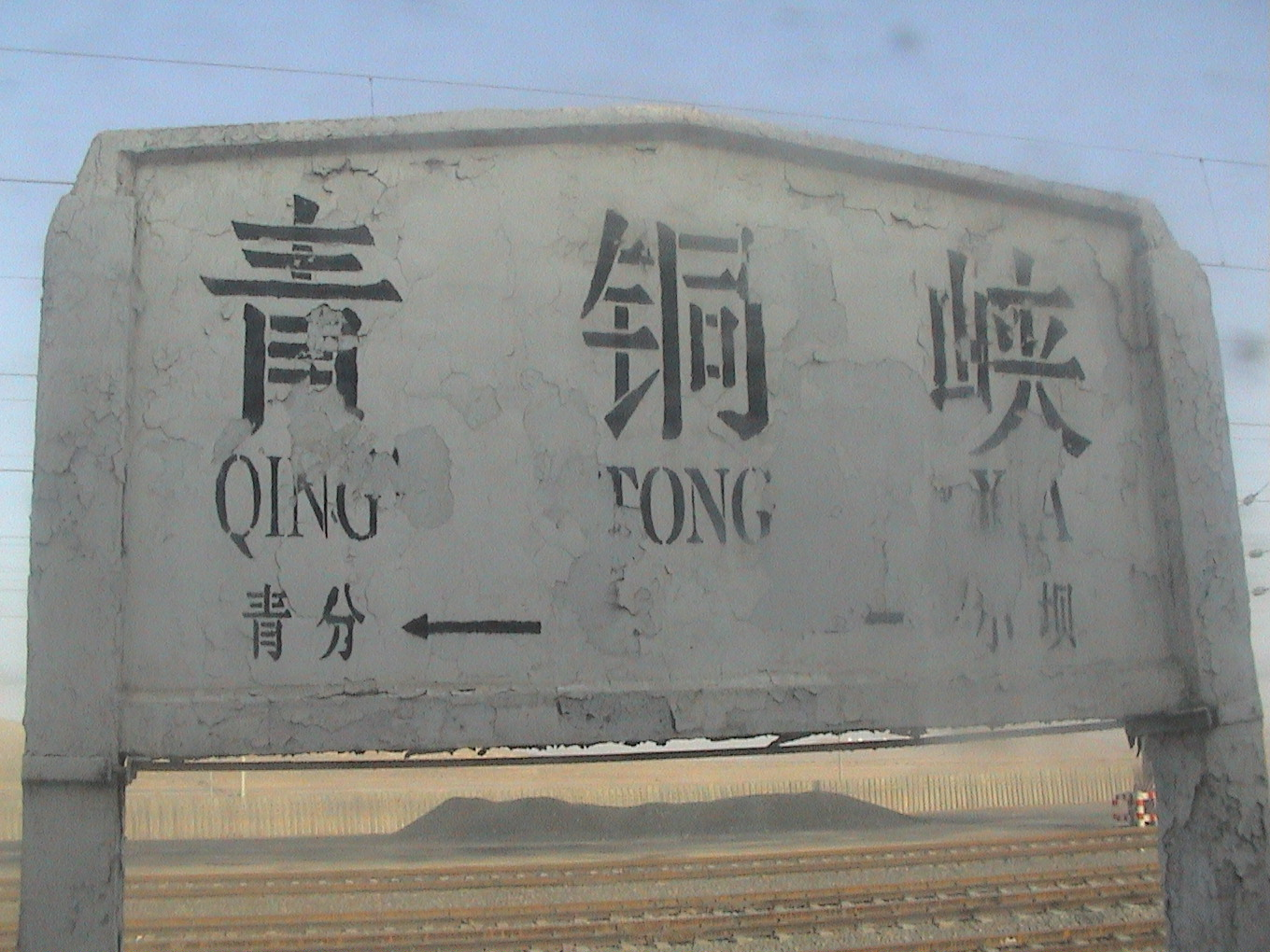
Train station sign

Qingtongxia (simplified Chinese: 青铜峡; traditional Chinese: 青銅峽; pinyin: Qīngtóngxiá; Wade–Giles: Ch’ing-t’ong-hsia; lit. 'Bronze Gorge', Xiao'erjing: ٿٍْ‌طْوثِيَا شِ) is a city in north-central Ningxia, China. Administratively, Qingtongxia is a county-level city within the prefecture-level city of Wuzhong. It is located on the left (northwestern) bank of the Yellow River, opposite and a bit upstream of Wuzhong main urban area, and borders Inner Mongolia to the west.

Qingtongxia had 264,717 residents in 2010. Many residents of Qingtongxia are Hui Muslim.

== Places of interest ==
On the bank of the Yellow River outside the city of Qingtongxia is the site of 108 Buddhist stupas which were constructed during the Western Xia period.

== Economy ==
Qingtongxia Dam on the Yellow River (37°53′05″N 105°59′25″E) is located in Qingtongxia. A major irrigation canal branches off the river near the dam and runs north.

== Administrative divisions ==
Qingtongxia City has 1 subdistrict, 8 towns and 1 farm.

1 subdistrict

- Yumin (裕民街道, ۋِمٍ ڭِيَ‌دَوْ)

7 towns

- Xiaoba (小坝镇, ثِيَوْبَا جٍ)
- Chenyuantan (陈袁滩镇, چٍ‌یُوًاتًا جٍ)
- Xiakou (峡口镇, ثِيَاکِوْ جٍ)
- Qujing (瞿靖镇, ٿِيُوِڭٍْ جٍ)
- Yesheng (叶盛镇, يَ‌شٍْ جٍ)
- Qingtongxia (青铜峡镇, ٿٍْ‌طْوثِيًا جٍ)
- Daba (大坝镇, دَابَا جٍ)
- Shaogang (邵岗镇)

1 other

- Shuxin Forestry Farm (树新林场, شُ‌ثٍ لٍ‌چَانْ)

== Climate ==
Climate data for Qingtongxia, elevation 1,126 m (3,694 ft), (1991–2020 normals, extremes 1981–2010)
Month	Jan	Feb	Mar	Apr	May	Jun	Jul	Aug	Sep	Oct	Nov	Dec	Year
Record high °C (°F)	12.3 (54.1)	21.8 (71.2)	27.4 (81.3)	35.5 (95.9)	35.9 (96.6)	36.5 (97.7)	37.7 (99.9)	35.6 (96.1)	35.3 (95.5)	28.3 (82.9)	23.7 (74.7)	16.3 (61.3)	37.7 (99.9)
Mean daily maximum °C (°F)	0.9 (33.6)	5.9 (42.6)	12.9 (55.2)	20.6 (69.1)	25.0 (77.0)	28.7 (83.7)	30.2 (86.4)	28.4 (83.1)	23.9 (75.0)	17.8 (64.0)	9.3 (48.7)	2.2 (36.0)	17.2 (62.9)
Daily mean °C (°F)	−6.0 (21.2)	−1.7 (28.9)	5.2 (41.4)	12.8 (55.0)	17.9 (64.2)	22.2 (72.0)	23.9 (75.0)	22.0 (71.6)	16.7 (62.1)	10.0 (50.0)	2.8 (37.0)	−4.0 (24.8)	10.2 (50.3)
Mean daily minimum °C (°F)	−11.4 (11.5)	−7.5 (18.5)	−1.0 (30.2)	5.6 (42.1)	10.8 (51.4)	15.6 (60.1)	18.1 (64.6)	16.5 (61.7)	11.2 (52.2)	4.1 (39.4)	−2.0 (28.4)	−8.7 (16.3)	4.3 (39.7)
Record low °C (°F)	−25.0 (−13.0)	−23.7 (−10.7)	−17.9 (−0.2)	−6.5 (20.3)	−4.3 (24.3)	6.1 (43.0)	10.4 (50.7)	6.6 (43.9)	−0.7 (30.7)	−8.7 (16.3)	−14.3 (6.3)	−23.6 (−10.5)	−25.0 (−13.0)
Average precipitation mm (inches)	1.4 (0.06)	1.7 (0.07)	4.6 (0.18)	8.1 (0.32)	17.9 (0.70)	26.7 (1.05)	41.4 (1.63)	41.4 (1.63)	28.6 (1.13)	11.8 (0.46)	3.8 (0.15)	0.6 (0.02)	188 (7.4)
Average precipitation days (≥ 0.1 mm)	1.5	1.0	2.1	3.5	4.4	6.3	7.6	8.0	7.2	3.8	1.9	0.7	48
Average snowy days	2.7	1.7	1.4	0.6	0	0	0	0	0	0.3	1.7	1.2	9.6
Average relative humidity (%)	47	41	40	37	45	53	61	66	67	58	54	49	52
Mean monthly sunshine hours	214.8	215.8	252.6	275.2	304.3	301.1	293.4	268.9	231.6	247.7	222.7	218.1	3,046.2
Percentage possible sunshine	70	70	68	69	69	68	66	65	63	72	74	74	69
Source: China Meteorological Administration
