= Xiaoba, Ningxia =

Xiaoba 小坝镇
- Town
- Location in Ningxia
- Coordinates: 38°1′16″N 106°4′8″E
- Country: People's Republic of China
- Autonomous region: Ningxia
- Prefecture-level city: Wuzhong
- County-level city: Qingtongxia
- Time zone: UTC+8 (China Standard)

Xiaoba (simplified Chinese: 小坝; traditional Chinese: 小垻; pinyin: Xiǎobà) is a town under the administration of Qingtongxia, Ningxia, China. As of 2018, it has nine villages under its administration.
