= Beichuan High School =

Secondary school in Sichuan, China

- Yongchang, Beichuan Qiang Autonomous County, Sichuan; China

Information
- Type: Secondary school

Sichuan Province Beichuan High School (S: 四川省北川中学, T: 四川省北川中學, P: Sìchuān Shěng Běichuān Zhōngxué "Beichuan Middle School", SCSBCZX) is a secondary school located in Yongchang, Beichuan Qiang Autonomous County, Sichuan.

== History ==
Prior to the 2008 Wenchuan earthquake, the school had 2,800 students and teachers. As a result of the earthquake, over 1,000 deaths occurred at the school.

Construction began on the new school campus, located in Yongchang, on May 12, 2009. The 200 million yuan campus opened before September 1, 2010. Most of the funding came from corporations and organizations in China and from other countries. The All-China Federation of Returned Overseas Chinese sponsored the project and had it built.

== Campus ==
The 150,000-square-metre (1,600,000 sq ft) campus area has a floor area of 72,000 square metres (780,000 sq ft). The campus includes a three-story academic building. Xiong Qu of China Central Television said that the school building "has strong characters of the Qiang Nationality." Xiong wrote that the buildings could withstand a magnitude 8 earthquake. It can house up to 5,200 students.

== Demographics ==
As of May 9, 2011 the school has 2,600 students in 53 classes.
