= Jian River (Sichuan) =

Tributary of Fu River in Sichuan, China

The Jian River (Chinese: 湔江 or 涧河; pinyin: Jiān Jiāng or Jiān Hé) is a river in China, the headwater stream of Tongkou River (通口河). The Tongkou joins the Fu River which is a tributary of the Yangtze. The Jian River flows through Beichuan Qiang Autonomous County, Sichuan. The 2008 Sichuan earthquake caused a landslide dam on the river which created Tangjiashan Lake. More than 100,000 people were evacuated downstream while a sluice was constructed. The river went to a blood red or crimson color due to pollution.
