= Xiaoba, Beichuan County =

Xiaoba 小坝镇
- Town
- Location in Sichuan
- Coordinates: 32°1′3″N 104°12′40″E
- Country: People's Republic of China
- Province: Sichuan
- Prefecture-level city: Mianyang
- Autonomous county: Beichuan Qiang Autonomous County
- Time zone: UTC+8 (China Standard)

Xiaoba (simplified Chinese: 小坝; traditional Chinese: 小垻; pinyin: Xiǎobà) is a town under the administration of Beichuan Qiang Autonomous County, Sichuan, China. As of 2018, it has one residential community and 26 villages under its administration.
