= Xiaoba Subdistrict =

Xiaoba Subdistrict 肖坝街道
- Subdistrict
- Location in Sichuan
- Coordinates: 29.5573°N 103.7372°E
- Country: People's Republic of China
- Province: Sichuan
- Prefecture-level city: Leshan
- District: Shizhong District
- Time zone: UTC+8 (China Standard)

Xiaoba Subdistrict (simplified Chinese: 肖坝街道; traditional Chinese: 肖垻街道; pinyin: Xiāobà Jiēdào) is a subdistrict in Shizhong District, Leshan, Sichuan, China. As of 2018, it has 6 residential communities under its administration.

== See also ==
- List of township-level divisions of Sichuan
