= Xiaoba Township =

Xiaoba Township 小坝乡
- Township
- Location in Sichuan
- Coordinates: 26°34′46″N 102°23′41″E
- Country: People's Republic of China
- Province: Sichuan
- Autonomous prefecture: Liangshan Yi Autonomous Prefecture
- County: Huidong County
- Time zone: UTC+8 (China Standard)

Xiaoba Township (simplified Chinese: 小坝乡; traditional Chinese: 小垻鄉; pinyin: Xiǎobà Xiāng) is a township under the administration of Huidong County, Sichuan, China. As of 2018, it has nine villages under its administration.
