= Tongxin County =

Tongxin 同心县 طْوثٍ ثِيًا Tungsin
- County
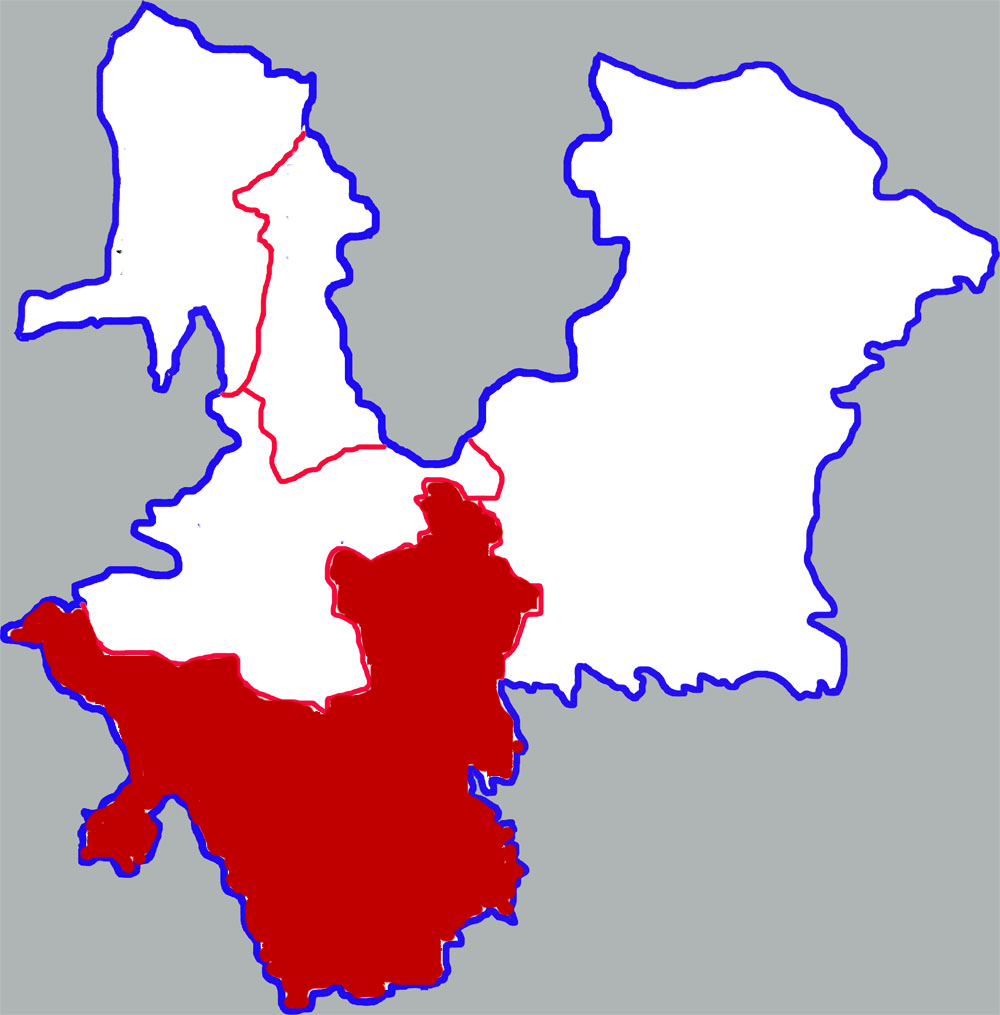
- Tongxin in Wuzhong

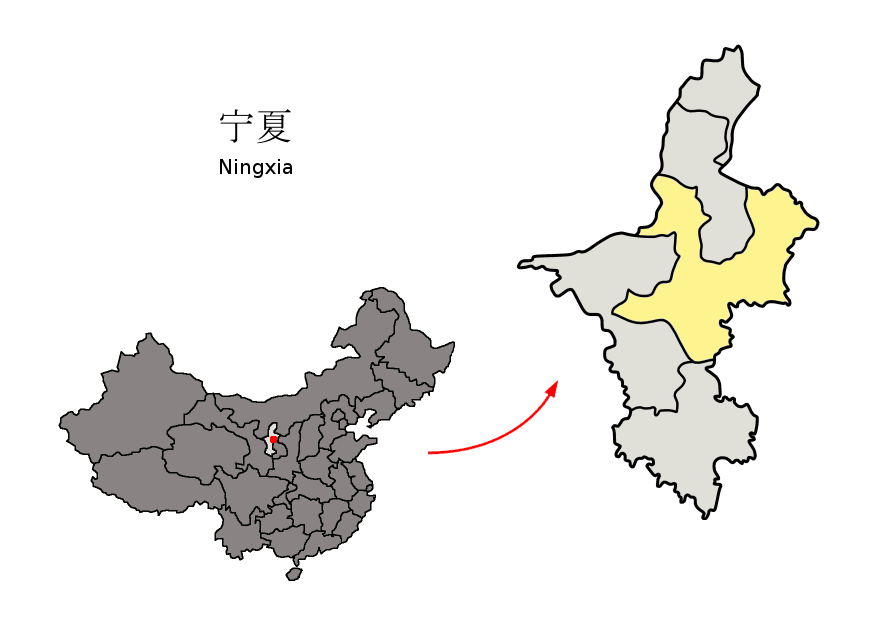
- Wuzhong in Ningxia
- Coordinates (Tongxin government): 36°57′16″N 105°53′43″E
- Country: China
- Autonomous region: Ningxia
- Prefecture-level city: Wuzhong (de jure) provincial administered (de facto)
- County seat: Yuhai

Area
  - Total: 4,433.34 km^{2} (1,711.72 sq mi)

Population
  - Total: 318,153
  - Density: 71.7637/km^{2} (185.867/sq mi)
- Time zone: UTC+8 (China Standard)

Tongxin County (simplified Chinese: 同心县; traditional Chinese: 同心縣; pinyin: Tóngxīn Xiàn, Xiao'erjing: طْوثٍ ثِيًا) is a county under the administration of the prefecture-level city of Wuzhong in the central part of the Ningxia Hui Autonomous Region of China, bordering Gansu province to the east. It has a total area of 7,021 square kilometers with a population of approximately 360,000 people.

== Characteristics ==
Due to its topography, Tongxin County's economic conditions and foundation are extremely poor, and the county is often stricken by drought. However, farmers still make up two-thirds of the county's population. The county government has sought to use high technological methods to improve the standard of living in the region. The county government is located in the town of Yuhai.

== History ==
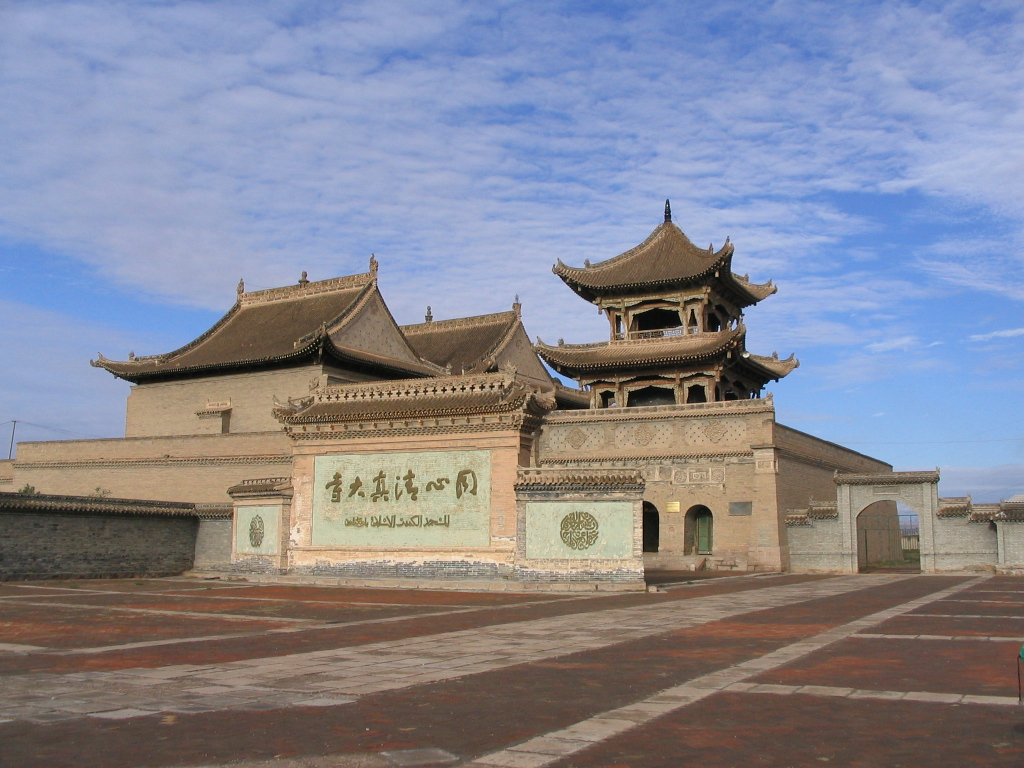
Tongxin Great Mosque

In his Red Star Over China, Edgar Snow mentions visiting the small towns of Yuwang Bao and Yuwang (予旺, 36°49′N 100°23′E) located in today's Tongxin County. At the moment (summer/fall 1936), Yuwang Bao was the location of the headquarters of the First Front Red Army, where Edgar Snow met with the army's commander, Peng Dehuai there. Edgar Snow described Yuwang Bao as follows:

On the high, stout walls of Yu Wang Pao a squad of Red buglers was practicing, and from a corner of this fortlike city flew a big scarlet flag, its yellow hammer and ciskle cracking out in the breeze... We could look down on one side to a clean courtyard, where Muslim women were hulling rice and baking. Washing hung from a line on another side. In a distant square some Red soldiers were practicing wall scaling, broad jumping, and grenade throwing.

Yuwang (40 li north-west of Yuwang Bao), recently captured by the Reds from the troops of Ma Hongkui after a ten-day siege, was described as

an ancient Muslim city of four or five hundred families, with a magnificent wall of stone and brick. Outside of the wall was a Muslim mosque, with its own wall of beautiful glazed brick unscarred. But other buildings showed signs of the siege this city had undergone before it was taken by the Reds.

In October 1936, a public meeting was held at the Tongxin Great Mosque, establishing the Yuwang Hui Autonomous Government - the first autonomous county in Communist China. Although this autonomous unit was short-lived, the mosque building was protected as a revolutionary historical site, and became the only major Islamic building in Ningxia to survive destruction during the Cultural Revolution.

== Administrative divisions ==
Tongxin County has 7 towns and 4 townships.

Towns

- Yuhai (豫海镇, ۋِخَيْ جٍ)
- Dingtang (丁塘镇, دٍتًانْ جٍ)
- Wangtuan (王团镇, وَانْ‌تُوًا جٍ)
- Xiamaguan (下马关镇, ثِيَامَاقُوًا جٍ)
- Weizhou (韦州镇, وِجِوْ جٍ)
- Hexi (河西镇, حَ‌ثِ جٍ)
- Yuwang (预旺镇, ۋِوَانْ جٍ)

Townships

- Xinglong (兴隆乡, ثٍْ‌لْو ثِيَانْ)
- Magaozhuang (马高庄乡, مَاقَوْجُوَانْ ثِيَانْ)
- Tianlaozhuang (田老庄乡, تِیًالَوْجُوَانْ ثِيَانْ)
- Zhangjiayuan (张家塬乡, جَانْ‌ڭِيَایُوًا ثِيَانْ)

== Demographics ==
According to the regional census of 1983, Tongxin County had the second-highest percentage of the Hui (Muslim Chinese) people in its population among all counties in Ningxia, second only to Jingyuan County. 79.0% of its population at the time (172,906 out of 218,967) were Hui.

== Climate ==
Climate data for Tongxin, elevation 1,336 m (4,383 ft), (1991–2020 normals, extremes 1981–2010)
Month	Jan	Feb	Mar	Apr	May	Jun	Jul	Aug	Sep	Oct	Nov	Dec	Year
Record high °C (°F)	15.1 (59.2)	22.2 (72.0)	27.6 (81.7)	35.4 (95.7)	36.6 (97.9)	36.8 (98.2)	39.0 (102.2)	37.4 (99.3)	35.3 (95.5)	29.0 (84.2)	22.7 (72.9)	17.8 (64.0)	39.0 (102.2)
Mean daily maximum °C (°F)	1.5 (34.7)	6.2 (43.2)	12.9 (55.2)	19.9 (67.8)	24.8 (76.6)	28.9 (84.0)	30.3 (86.5)	28.5 (83.3)	23.5 (74.3)	17.4 (63.3)	10.2 (50.4)	3.3 (37.9)	17.3 (63.1)
Daily mean °C (°F)	−6.4 (20.5)	−1.7 (28.9)	5.2 (41.4)	12.3 (54.1)	17.5 (63.5)	21.9 (71.4)	23.5 (74.3)	21.8 (71.2)	16.8 (62.2)	10.1 (50.2)	2.4 (36.3)	−4.5 (23.9)	9.9 (49.8)
Mean daily minimum °C (°F)	−12.3 (9.9)	−7.9 (17.8)	−1.1 (30.0)	5.5 (41.9)	10.7 (51.3)	15.3 (59.5)	17.7 (63.9)	16.4 (61.5)	11.5 (52.7)	4.5 (40.1)	−3.0 (26.6)	−9.9 (14.2)	4.0 (39.1)
Record low °C (°F)	−28.3 (−18.9)	−27.9 (−18.2)	−16.7 (1.9)	−6.7 (19.9)	−3.1 (26.4)	6.6 (43.9)	10.3 (50.5)	6.0 (42.8)	0.4 (32.7)	−10.4 (13.3)	−16.8 (1.8)	−24.9 (−12.8)	−28.3 (−18.9)
Average precipitation mm (inches)	2.3 (0.09)	2.6 (0.10)	6.7 (0.26)	13.2 (0.52)	24.9 (0.98)	38.1 (1.50)	54.8 (2.16)	57.2 (2.25)	38.8 (1.53)	17.4 (0.69)	3.9 (0.15)	1.1 (0.04)	261 (10.27)
Average precipitation days (≥ 0.1 mm)	2.7	2.3	2.9	4.3	5.9	6.9	8.5	8.4	8.1	5.1	2.2	1.0	58.3
Average snowy days	3.7	3.3	2.7	0.7	0.1	0	0	0	0	0.6	2.2	2.0	15.3
Average relative humidity (%)	52	47	42	40	43	49	59	63	64	60	57	53	52
Mean monthly sunshine hours	212.7	211.4	241.9	256.4	283.3	283.7	278.8	261.0	219.1	229.0	217.7	219.4	2,914.4
Percentage possible sunshine	69	68	65	65	64	65	63	63	60	67	72	74	66
Source: China Meteorological Administration

Climate data for Weizhou Town, Tongxin County, elevation 1,382 m (4,534 ft), (1991–2020 normals)
Month	Jan	Feb	Mar	Apr	May	Jun	Jul	Aug	Sep	Oct	Nov	Dec	Year
Mean daily maximum °C (°F)	1.3 (34.3)	5.6 (42.1)	12.0 (53.6)	19.0 (66.2)	24.0 (75.2)	28.2 (82.8)	29.8 (85.6)	27.7 (81.9)	22.7 (72.9)	16.8 (62.2)	9.8 (49.6)	3.1 (37.6)	16.7 (62.0)
Daily mean °C (°F)	−6.0 (21.2)	−1.8 (28.8)	4.7 (40.5)	11.8 (53.2)	17.3 (63.1)	21.8 (71.2)	23.5 (74.3)	21.5 (70.7)	16.3 (61.3)	9.7 (49.5)	2.6 (36.7)	−4.0 (24.8)	9.8 (49.6)
Mean daily minimum °C (°F)	−11.4 (11.5)	−7.5 (18.5)	−1.3 (29.7)	5.2 (41.4)	10.5 (50.9)	15.3 (59.5)	17.7 (63.9)	16.2 (61.2)	11.3 (52.3)	4.5 (40.1)	−2.5 (27.5)	−9.1 (15.6)	4.1 (39.3)
Average precipitation mm (inches)	2.6 (0.10)	2.3 (0.09)	5.8 (0.23)	12.6 (0.50)	24.2 (0.95)	36.7 (1.44)	57.5 (2.26)	67.8 (2.67)	40.5 (1.59)	16.2 (0.64)	5.2 (0.20)	0.8 (0.03)	272.2 (10.7)
Average precipitation days (≥ 0.1 mm)	2.5	2.2	3.3	4.4	5.3	7.0	8.6	9.5	8.2	4.8	2.7	0.9	59.4
Average snowy days	3.3	3.3	2.8	0.7	0.1	0	0	0	0	0.6	2.4	1.9	15.1
Average relative humidity (%)	45	42	38	36	39	44	54	61	62	54	48	44	47
Mean monthly sunshine hours	209.3	203.7	234.5	252.6	277.9	279.9	281.3	258.4	214.5	227.0	213.8	213.0	2,865.9
Percentage possible sunshine	68	66	63	64	63	64	63	62	58	66	71	72	65
Source: China Meteorological Administration

== Bibliography ==
- Dru C. Gladney, Muslim Chinese: Ethnic Nationalism in the People's Republic. 1st ed.: Harvard University Press, 1991, ISBN 0-674-59495-9; 2nd ed., 1996. ISBN 0-674-59497-5.
