= Yu Min (linguist) =

Chinese linguist (1916–1995)

Yu Min (Chinese: 俞敏; November 1916– July 1995) was an influential Chinese linguist, a 1940 graduate of the Fu Jen Catholic University, Chinese Department, a former professor of Yenching University, and professor of Beijing Normal University. His primary research areas were Chinese historical linguistics, Sino-Tibetan comparison, the study of Sanskrit in Chinese transcription. His collected writings were published posthumously in 1999.

== Biography ==
Yu Min was born in Tianjin in November 1916. In 1940, he graduated from Fu Jen Catholic University.

From 1947 to 1952, he worked at Yenching University. He became Professor of Beijing Normal University in 1953.

Yu Min died on July 2, 1995.

== Major works ==
- 《古汉语里面的连音变读现象》(1948)
- 《论古韵合怗屑没曷五部之通转》(1948)
- 《后汉三国梵汉对音谱》(1979)
- 《连音变读》依据现代语音学理论考察古文献，归纳出同化和增音等几个类型，对古异文、古音通转和构拟都提出了新见解。
- 《通转》沟通音韵和语法，探讨上古汉语派生新词的模式。
- 《对音谱》以梵文校佛经译语,探等韵之源并摆脱其束缚,从而使古音韵研究离去玄想，脚踏实地。
- 《汉语的"其"跟藏语的gji》(1949)
- 《汉藏语虚字比较研究》(1984)
- 《评〈北京话单音词词汇〉》(1951)最早提出重叠式可以分开形容词和动词的界限的理论。
- 《中国语文论文选》
- 《经传释词杞记》
- 《俞敏语言学论文集》（商务印书馆，1999）
- Yú Mǐn 俞敏, “Lùn gǔyùn hé, tiē, xiè, mò, hé wǔ bù zhī tōngzhuǎn 論古韻合帖屑沒曷五部之通轉” [On the alternation between the rhyme groups 合 (*‑ap), 帖 (*‑ap), 屑 (*‑it), 皮 (*‑әt), hé 曷 (*‑at) in Old Chinese rhyming; engl. Abstract: “Word derivation in Archaic Chinese through Annexing of the Suffx D”], Yānjīng xuébào 燕京学报 34, 1948a, 29–48, 318, repr in: Yú Mǐn 俞敏, 1989, 126–138.
- Yú Mǐn 俞敏, “Gǔ Hànyǔ lǐmiàn de liányīn biàndú (sandhi) xiànxiàng 古漢語裏面的連音變讀 (sandhi) 現象” [Tone sandhi in Old Chinese], Yānjīng xuébào 燕京学报 35, 1948b, 34–55.
- Yú Mǐn 俞敏, “Gǔ Hànyǔ lǐ de lǐsú yǔyuán 古漢語裏的俚俗语源” [Folk etymology in Old Chinese], Yānjīng xuébào 燕京学报 36, 1949a, 48–71, 342–343.
- Yú Mǐn 俞敏, “Hànyǔ de ‘qí’ gēn Zàngyǔ de ‘gji’ 漢語的‘其’跟藏語的 ‘gji’” [Chinese ‘qí’ and Tibetan ‘gji’], Yānjīng xuébào 燕京学报 37, 1949b, 75–94, repr. in: Yú Mǐn 俞敏, 1984, 358–371.
- Yú Mǐn 俞敏, “Hànyǔ de àichēng hé zēngchēng de láiyuán hé qūbié 汉语的爱称和憎称的来源和区别” [On the origins and differences between terms of endearment and of abuse in Chinese], Zhōngguó yǔwén 中国语文 2, 1954, 15–17.
- Yú Mǐn 俞敏, “Hànyǔ de jùzǐ 汉语的句子” [Sentencehood in Chinese], Zhōngguó yǔwén 中国语文 7, 1957, 7–11.
- Yú Mǐn 俞敏, “Yésībósēn 叶斯柏森, Jens Otto Harry Jespersen (1860–1943)”, Guówài yǔyánxué 国外语言学 3, 1980a, 41–43.
- Yú Mǐn 俞敏, “Dàojù tànyuán 倒句探原” [Exploring the origin of OV word order], Yǔyán yánjiū 语言研究 1, 1980b, 78–82, repr. in: Yú Mǐn 俞敏, 1989, 288–294.
- Yú Mǐn 俞敏, “Hàn-Zàng liǎng zú rén hé huà tóngyuán tànsuǒ 汉藏两族人和话同源探索” [On the common origins of the Chinese and Tibetan languages and peoples], Běijīng shīfàn dàxué xuébào 北京师范大学学报 1, 1980c, 45–53.
- Yú Mǐn 俞敏, “Shī ‘bó yán’ jiě píng yì 詩‘薄言’解平議” [An appraisal of the explanations of bó yán in the Odes], Zhōngguó yǔyánxué xuébào 中国语言学学报1, 1982, 160–166.
- Yú Mǐn 俞敏, “Bějīng kǒuyǔ lǐ de ‘gěi’ zì 北京口语里的‘给’字” [The word gěi in the Běijīng colloquial], Yǔwén xuéxí 语文学习 10, 1983, 46–47.
- Yú Mǐn 俞敏, Zhōngguó yú wénxué lùnwén xuǎn 中國與文學論文選 [Selected papers in Chinese linguistics and philology], Tōkyō: Kôseikan 光生館, 1984a.
- Yú Mǐn 俞敏, “Gēnr, gēr liǎ, gērmen 哥儿、哥儿俩、哥儿们”, Fāngyán 方言 3, 1984b, 197–198.
- Yú Mǐn 俞敏, “Běijīng yīnxì de chéngzhǎng hé shòu de zhōuwéi yǐngxiǎng 北京音系的成长和受的周围影响” [The growth of the Běijīng sound system and how it was influenced by the environment], Fāngyán 方言 4, 1984c, 272–277 .
- Yú Mǐn 俞敏, “Děng yùn sù yuán 等韵溯源” [The sources of linguistic ·terminology in the rhyme tables], Yīnyùnxué yánjiū 音韵学研究 1, 1984d, 402–413, repr. in: Yú Mǐn 俞敏 1989, 338–356.
- Yú Mǐn 俞敏, Jīng zhuàn shì cí zhájì 經傳釋詞札記 [Reading notes on Exposition of function words handed down in the classics (by Wáng Yǐnzhī 王引之, 1766–1834)], Chángshā 長沙: Húnán jiàoyù 湖南教育出版社, 1987a.
- Yú Mǐn 俞敏, “Lùn Běijīng kǒuyǔ de dòng-bīn jigòu 论北京口语的动宾结构” [On the verb-object construction in the Běijīng colloquial], Shìjè Hànyǔ jiàoxué 世界汉语教学 2, 1987b, 3–5.
- Yú Mǐn 俞敏, “Zhùfáng qírén hé fāngyán de érhuà 驻防旗人和方言的儿化韵” [The Manchu garrison bannerman and dialectal rhoticisiation], Zhōngguó yǔwén 中国语文 5, 1987c, 346–352.
- Yú Mǐn 俞敏, “Běijīng kǒuyǔ ‘kàn bù jiàn’, ‘zhǎo bù zháo’ yī lèi de cí 北京口语 ‘看不见、找不着’ 一类的词” [On the type of words like kàn bù jiàn [unable to see], zhǎo bù zháo [unable to find] in the Běijīng colloquial], Fāngyán 方言 4, 1988a, 247–256.
- Yú Mǐn 俞敏, “Hànyǔ lǐ de yī zhǒng xīnxíng de ‘púgàijuàr cí’ 汉语里的一种新型的 ‘铺盖卷儿词’(portmanteau word)” [A newly arisen pattern of ‘portmanteau words’ in Chinese], Yǔwén yánjiū 语文研究 8, 1988b, 1–2.
- Yú Mǐn 俞敏, “Běijīnghuà běnzì zhájì 北京話本字劄記” [Reading notes on etymographs in the Běijīng colloquial], Fāngyán 方言 10/2, 1988c, 152–154.
- Yú Mǐn 俞敏, “Běijīng kǒuyǔ lǐ de ‘dòngmíng cí’ 北京口语的 ‘动名词’” [On verbal nouns in the Běijīng colloquial], Yǔyán jiàoxué yǔ yánjīu 语言教学与研究 1, 1989a, 6–9.
- Yú Mǐn 俞敏, Yú Mǐn yǔyánxué lùnwénjí 俞敏语言学论文集 [Collected scholarly articles on linguistics by Yú Mǐn], Hā’ěrbīn 哈尔滨: Hēilóngjiāng rénmín 黑龙江人民出版社, 1989b.
- Yú Mǐn 俞敏, “Hàn-Zàng tóngyuánzì pǔgǎo 漢藏同源字譜稿” [A draft table of Sino-Tibetan cognate words], Mínzú yǔwén 民族语文 1-2, 1989c, 56–77, 49–64.
- Yú Mǐn 俞敏, “Hàn-Zàng xūcí bǐjiào yánjiū” 汉藏虚词比较研究 [A comparative study of Chinese and Tibetan grammatical particles], in: Yú Mǐn, 1989c, 320–356.
- Yú Mǐn 俞敏, “‘Dǎ’ yǎ 打雅” [A dictionary of polysemy style entry on dǎ], Yǔyán jiàoxué yǔ yánjiū 语言教学与研究 1, 1991a, 4–13.
- Yú Mǐn 俞敏, “Dōng-Hàn yǐqián de Qiāngyǔ hé Xī-Qiāngyǔ 東漢以前的羌語和西羌語” [On the languages of the Qiāng and the Western Qiāng of the Eastern Hàn], Mínzú yǔwén 民族语文 1, 1991b, 1–11, repr. in: Yú Mǐn俞敏, 1992a, 179–197.
- Yú Mǐn 俞敏, “Hàn-Zàng wénxiànxué xiānghù wéi yòng yī lì: Cóng Zhèng zhù Zhōulǐ: ‘Gǔzhě “lì”, “wèi” tóng zì’ shuō dào Lù Fǎyán Qièyùn xù: “Qín-Lǒng zé qùshēng wèi rù” 汉藏文献学相互为用一例——从郑注 ‘周礼’：‘古者立位同字’ 说到陆陸法言 ‘切韵韻序’：‘秦陇则則去声为入’” [One example on the mutual usefulness of Chinese and Tibetan textual philology: From Zhèng’s Commentary to the Rituals of Zhōu’s “In Ancient Chinese, lì and wèi were the same character”, to Lù Fǎyán’s Preface to the Qièyùn’s “In Qín and Lǒng¸ the departing tone is realized as entering”], Yǔyán yánjiū 语言研究 1, 1991c, 128–132.
- Yú Mǐn 俞敏, Yǔyánxué lùnwén èr jí 語言學論文二集 [Collected scholarly articles on linguistics, volume II], Běijīng 北京: Běijīng shīfàn dàxué 北京师范大学出版社, 1992a.
- Yú Mǐn 俞敏, “Hàn-Zàng liánmiǎnzì bǐjiào 汉藏连绵字比较” [A comparison of phonologically correlated words in Chinese and Tibetan], repr. in: Yú Mǐn 俞敏, 1992b, 217–240.
- Yú Mǐn 俞敏, “Běijīng kǒuyǔ lǐ de duōyīn rùshēng zì 北京口语里的多音入声字” [Entering tone words with multiple readings in the Běijīng colloquial], Fāngyán 方言 1, 1995, 26–30.
- Yú Mǐn 俞敏, Yú Mǐn yǔyánxué lùnwénjí 俞敏语言学论文集, Běijīng 北京: Shāngwù 商务印书馆, 1999.
