= Yongchang, Sichuan =

County seat of Beichuan Qiang Autonomous County

Yongchang 永昌镇
- Town
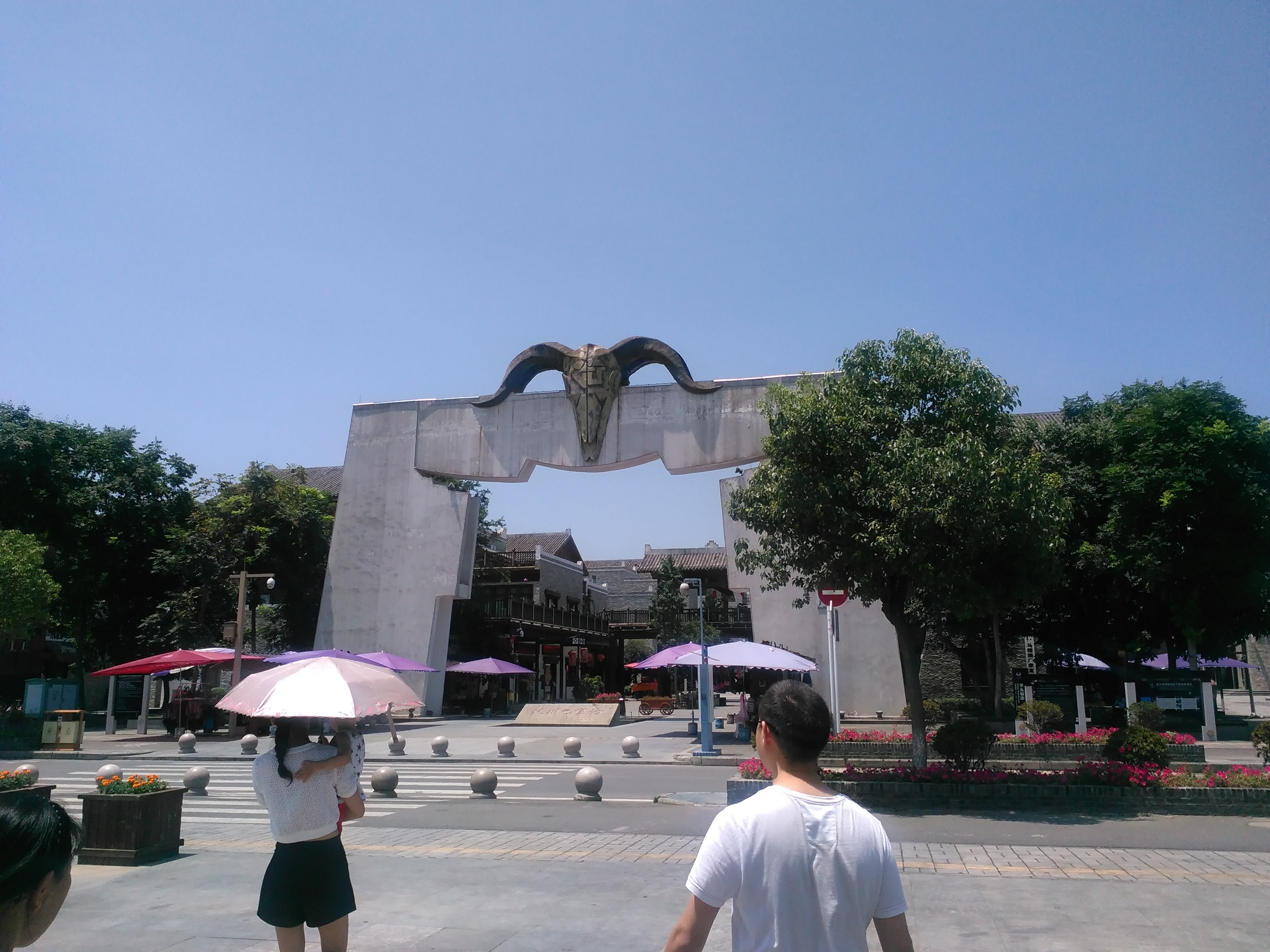
- City center
- Interactive map of Yongchang
- Country: China
- Province: Sichuan
- Prefecture-level city: Mianyang
- Autonomous county: Beichuan
- Subdivisions: 12: 6 residential communities 6 administrative villages

Yongchang Town (Chinese: 永昌镇) is the new county seat of Beichuan Qiang Autonomous County in Mianyang, Sichuan, China, one of the worst-hit areas in the 2008 Sichuan earthquake. It is between Yong'an Town (Chinese: 永安镇) and Anchang Town (Chinese: 安昌镇) of An County, about 23 kilometres (14 mi) from the former county seat of Beichuan. It is named after the two towns as "Yongchang Town", which means "eternal prosperity" in Chinese. Construction will be carried out here, including housing, schools, government buildings and hospitals.
