= Yumin Township =

Yumin Township 育民乡
- Township
- Location in Jilin
- Coordinates: 45°9′42″N 126°32′43″E
- Country: People's Republic of China
- Province: Jilin
- Prefecture-level city: Changchun
- County-level city: Yushu
- Time zone: UTC+8 (China Standard)

Yumin Township (simplified Chinese: 育民乡; traditional Chinese: 育民鄉; pinyin: Yùmín Xiāng) is a township under the administration of Yushu, Jilin, China. As of 2018, it has 12 villages under its administration.
