= Xiaoba, Anzhou District =

Xiaoba 晓坝镇
- Town
- Location in Sichuan
- Coordinates: 31°35′56″N 104°19′18″E
- Country: People's Republic of China
- Province: Sichuan
- Prefecture-level city: Mianyang
- District: Anzhou District
- Time zone: UTC+8 (China Standard)

Xiaoba (simplified Chinese: 晓坝; traditional Chinese: 曉垻; pinyin: Xiǎobà) is a town under the administration of Anzhou District, Mianyang, Sichuan, China. As of 2018, it has one residential community and 7 villages under its administration.
