= Beichuan Qiang Autonomous County =

Beichuan County 北川县
- Autonomous County
- 北川羌族自治县; Beichuan Qiang Autonomous County
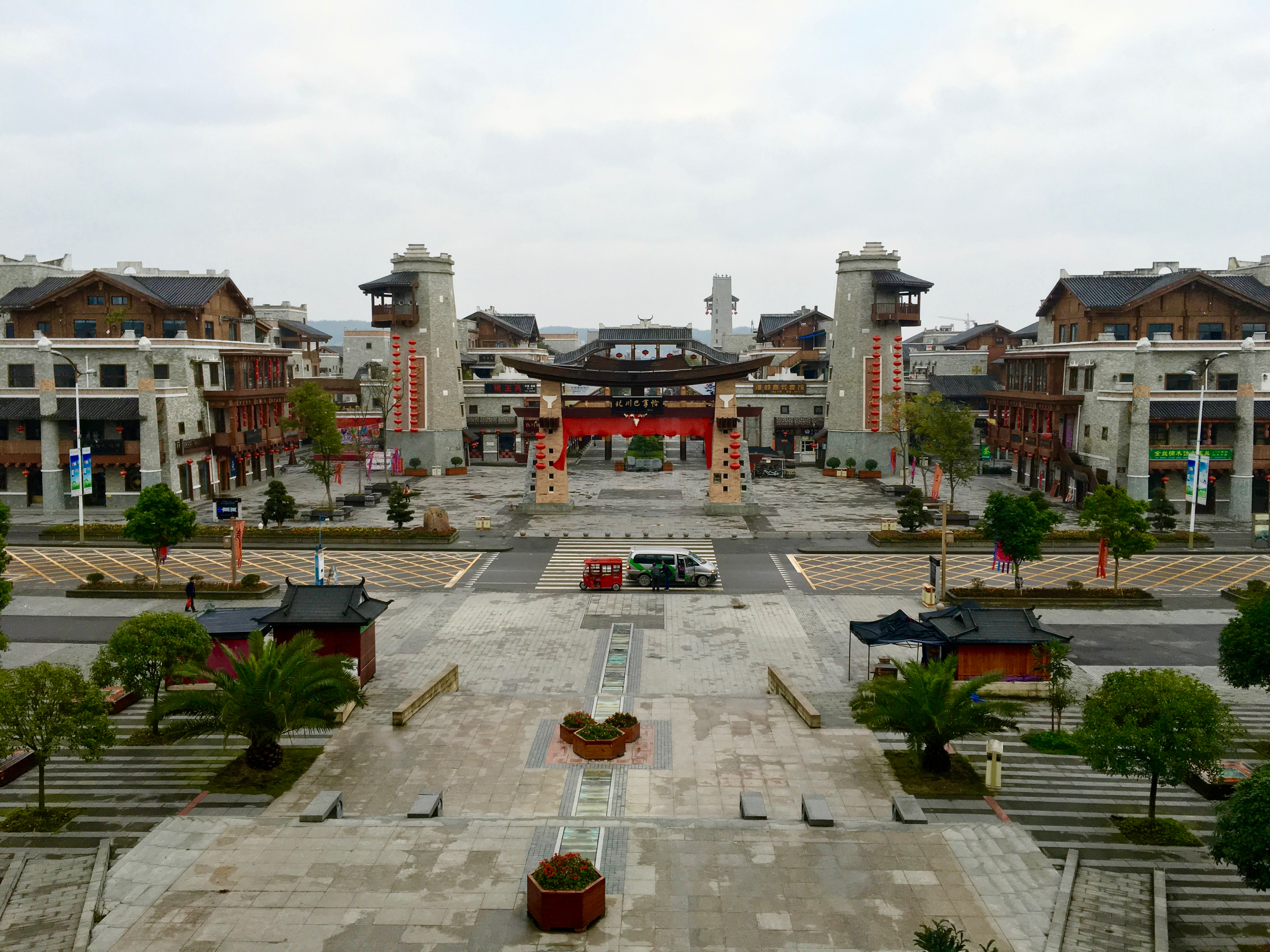

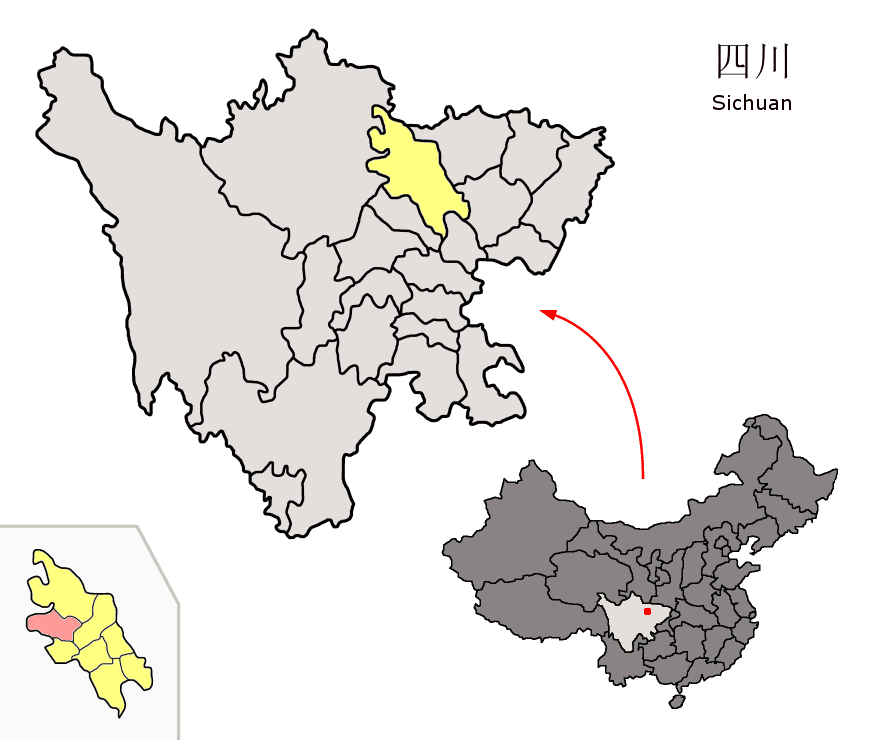
- Location of Beichuan County (lower left of the picture with colour of violet) within Mianyang City (yellow) and Sichuan

- Location of the county seat in Sichuan
- Coordinates (Beichuan County government): 31°37′02″N 104°28′06″E
- Country: China
- Province: Sichuan
- Prefecture-level city: Mianyang
- County seat: Yongchang

Area
  - Total: 3,112 km^{2} (1,202 sq mi)
- Elevation: 598 m (1,962 ft)

Population (2020)
  - Total: 174,132
  - Density: 55.96/km^{2} (144.9/sq mi)
- Time zone: UTC+8 (China Standard)
- Postal code: 622750
- Area code: 0816
- Website: www.beichuan.gov.cn

Beichuan Qiang Autonomous County (simplified Chinese: 北川羌族自治县; traditional Chinese: 北川羌族自治縣; pinyin: Běichuān Qiāngzú Zìzhì Xiàn; Qiang: Juda Rrmea nyujugvexueaji xae) is a county under the jurisdiction of Mianyang City in northern Sichuan province, China. It is located in an ethnically diverse mountainous region of Sichuan. Its Chinese name literally means "North" (bei) "River" (chuan). Its new county seat is located at Yongchang after the 2008 Sichuan earthquake.

== Geography ==
Beichuan County has an area of 3,084 square kilometres (1,191 sq mi). The county varies in elevation from 540 to 4,769 meters in height.

The county's major rivers, which include the Tongkou River, the Anchang River, and the Pingtong River (平通河; Píngtōng Hé) belong to the larger Fu River watershed.

== History and culture ==
The first administrative county of Beichuan was set up in 564 A.D. during the Northern Zhou dynasty. The Tang dynasty first created another county, Shiquan (Chinese: 石泉; pinyin: Shíquán) inside the original Beichuan county in 634 A.D., then in 651 A.D. merged Beichuan county into Shiquan. The Republic of China changed the county name back to Beichuan in 1914 because there had been a Shiquan county in Shaanxi province before 564 A.D.

In 1988, China granted Beichuan county the status of Qiang autonomy. The Beichuan Qiang Autonomous County was formally created on July 6, 2003.

=== Claim to Yu the Great ===
Beichuan was the first county in Sichuan to make the claim as the birthplace of Yu the Great, founder of the Xia dynasty and traditionally regarded as the first hereditary sovereign in Chinese history. Although this claim is probably more commercial than historical, Beichuan was part of West Qiang (Chinese: 西羌) that some ancient records accredited as Yu's birthplace, just like the other three locations in Sichuan, namely Wenchuan, Dujiangyan, and Shifang, that raised similar claims. Many places in other parts of China have made similar claims.

=== Great Sichuan Earthquake ===
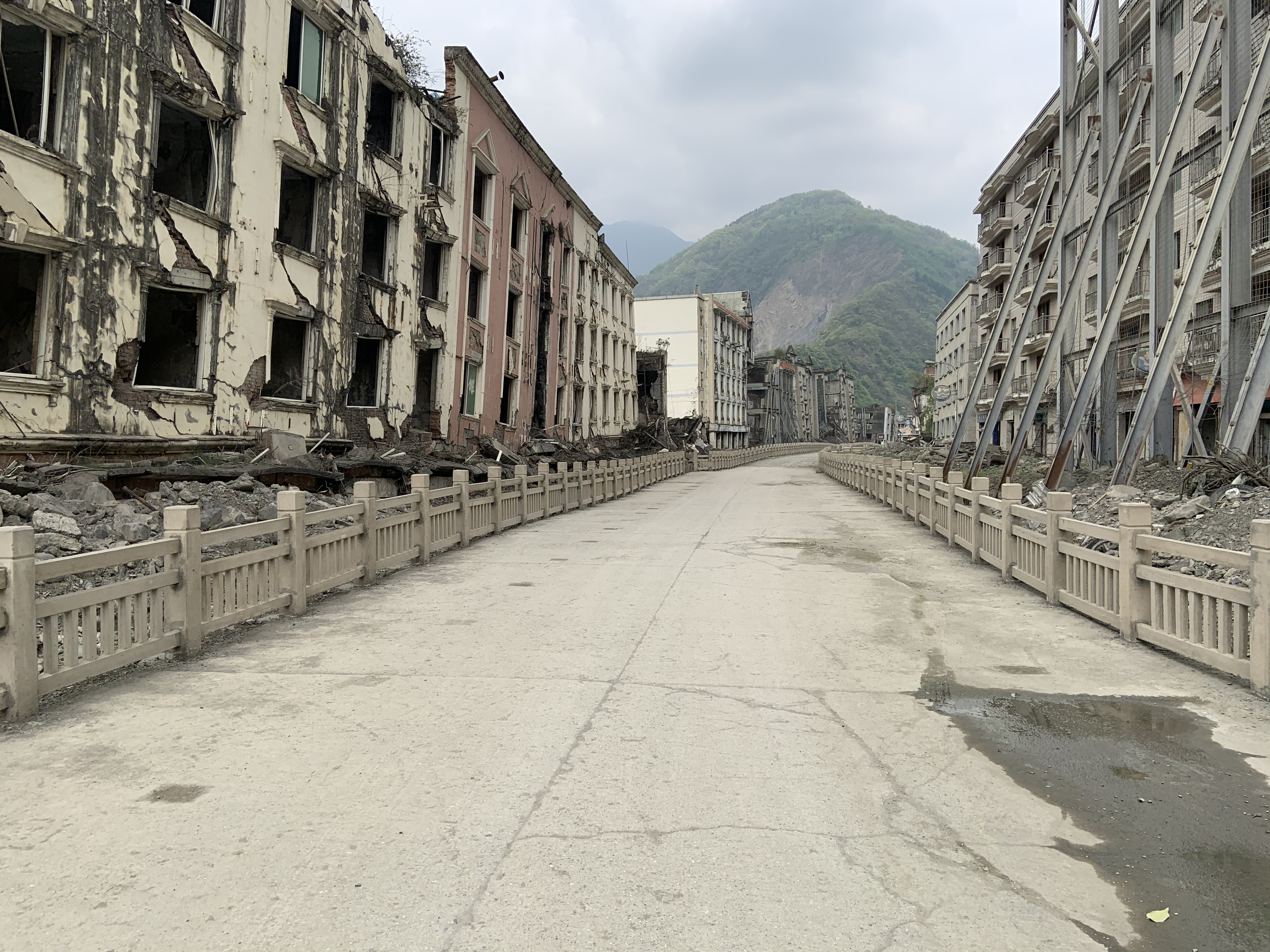
The old Downtown of Beichuan County being destroyed during 2008 Sichuan Earthquake

Also like the other three counties and towns in Sichuan holding claims to be the birthplace of Yu the Great, Beichuan is among the most severely hit of all disaster regions following the 2008 Sichuan earthquake, including the Beichuan High School campus, where more than 1,000 students lost their lives after two main buildings collapsed. Beichuan's Party and government building also collapsed, and Yang Zesen, Beichuan's vice mayor then was among the victims. 80% of the county's buildings are said to have collapsed.

The county town, which prior to the earthquake had a population of 20,000, is to be made into a memorial park, as the site has been deemed too vulnerable. The survivors of the quake have been relocated.

The earthquake also caused a landslide on Mount Tangjia which dammed the Jian River and created the Tangjiashan Quake Lake. The lake was once in danger of causing the Tangjiashan Dam to collapse and catastrophically flood downstream communities, totalling over a million persons. On June 10, 2008, the lake spilled through an artificially constructed sluice channel and flooded the evacuated town. No casualties were caused.

Beichuan was at the center of one of two zones where seismic intensity were the highest at XI liedu during this earthquake and its aftershocks. Since the earthquake, the central government has increased fortification intensity for seismic design for the old county town from VI to VIII.

== Administrative divisions ==
Beichuan County has 9 towns, 9 townships, and 1 ethnic township.

Towns

- Yongchang (永昌镇)
- Yong'an (永安镇)
- Qushan (曲山镇)
- Leigu (擂鼓镇)
- Tongquan (通泉镇)
- Guixi (桂溪镇)
- Yuli (禹里镇)
- Chenjiaba (陈家坝镇)
- Xiaoba (小坝镇)

Ethnic Township

- Taolong Tibetan Ethnic Township (桃龙藏族乡)

Townships

- Duguan Township (都贯乡)
- Xuanping Township (漩坪乡)
- Baini Township (白坭乡)
- Piankou Township (片口乡)
- Kaiping Township (开坪乡)
- Badi Township (坝底乡)
- Baishi Township (白什乡)
- Qingpian Township (青片乡)
- Macao Township (马槽乡)

== Demographics ==
Beichuan County had a population of 235,304 in 2017, of which 61.5% are Han Chinese, 36.6% of which are Qiang people (a Sino-Tibetan people related to Tibetans), 1.5% are Tibetans, 0.2% are Hui, and the remaining 0.2% belong to various other ethnic groups.

== Education ==
The county is home to 34 standard schools, of which, 24 are primary schools, 9 junior high schools, and 1 compulsory school.

Beichuan also houses the Beichuan Red Army Elementary School.

== Climate ==
Climate data for Beichuan, elevation 597 m (1,959 ft), (1991–2020 normals, extremes 1991–present)
Month	Jan	Feb	Mar	Apr	May	Jun	Jul	Aug	Sep	Oct	Nov	Dec	Year
Record high °C (°F)	18.9 (66.0)	22.1 (71.8)	32.0 (89.6)	32.5 (90.5)	35.0 (95.0)	38.1 (100.6)	37.3 (99.1)	38.7 (101.7)	34.0 (93.2)	30.5 (86.9)	25.3 (77.5)	20.3 (68.5)	38.7 (101.7)
Mean daily maximum °C (°F)	9.3 (48.7)	11.7 (53.1)	16.3 (61.3)	22.1 (71.8)	25.9 (78.6)	28.3 (82.9)	30.0 (86.0)	29.5 (85.1)	24.7 (76.5)	20.0 (68.0)	15.5 (59.9)	10.6 (51.1)	20.3 (68.6)
Daily mean °C (°F)	5.5 (41.9)	7.8 (46.0)	12.0 (53.6)	17.1 (62.8)	20.8 (69.4)	23.5 (74.3)	25.3 (77.5)	24.8 (76.6)	20.8 (69.4)	16.4 (61.5)	11.8 (53.2)	6.8 (44.2)	16.1 (60.9)
Mean daily minimum °C (°F)	2.8 (37.0)	5.0 (41.0)	8.8 (47.8)	13.3 (55.9)	17.0 (62.6)	20.0 (68.0)	22.0 (71.6)	21.6 (70.9)	18.4 (65.1)	14.2 (57.6)	9.4 (48.9)	4.3 (39.7)	13.1 (55.5)
Record low °C (°F)	−6.1 (21.0)	−3.2 (26.2)	0.0 (32.0)	3.9 (39.0)	9.4 (48.9)	13.8 (56.8)	17.5 (63.5)	16.5 (61.7)	11.4 (52.5)	6.4 (43.5)	0.3 (32.5)	−4.5 (23.9)	−6.1 (21.0)
Average precipitation mm (inches)	8.3 (0.33)	11.6 (0.46)	24.2 (0.95)	48.7 (1.92)	94.7 (3.73)	123.9 (4.88)	319.8 (12.59)	329.8 (12.98)	178.4 (7.02)	73.1 (2.88)	21.1 (0.83)	6.2 (0.24)	1,239.8 (48.81)
Average precipitation days (≥ 0.1 mm)	7.1	8.1	11.3	12.9	14.8	14.8	16.5	16.8	17.8	16.8	9.4	5.3	151.6
Average snowy days	1.8	0.8	0	0	0	0	0	0	0	0	0	0.4	3
Average relative humidity (%)	75	74	71	70	69	74	78	79	84	83	81	77	76
Mean monthly sunshine hours	52.4	49.3	69.6	101.8	116.8	102.5	111.1	119.5	52.9	42.2	49.5	53.6	921.2
Percentage possible sunshine	16	16	19	26	27	24	26	29	14	12	16	17	20
Source: China Meteorological Administration all-time extreme temperature all-time January highall-time July high
