= Yumin, Sichuan =

Yumin 裕民镇
- Town
- Location in Sichuan
- Coordinates: 30°19′33″N 106°27′24″E
- Country: People's Republic of China
- Province: Sichuan
- Prefecture-level city: Guang'an
- County: Yuechi County
- Time zone: UTC+8 (China Standard)

Yumin (Chinese: 裕民; pinyin: Yùmín) is a town under the administration of Yuechi County, Sichuan, China. As of 2018, it has one residential community and 26 villages under its administration.
