= Yumin Subdistrict, Harbin =

Yumin Subdistrict 裕民街道
- Subdistrict
- Location in Heilongjiang
- Coordinates: 45°52′2″N 126°30′36″E
- Country: People's Republic of China
- Province: Heilongjiang
- Prefecture-level city: Harbin
- District: Hulan District
- Time zone: UTC+8 (China Standard)

Yumin Subdistrict (Chinese: 裕民街道; pinyin: Yùmín Jiēdào) is a subdistrict in Hulan District, Harbin, Heilongjiang, China. As of 2018, it has 5 residential communities under its administration.

== See also ==
- List of township-level divisions of Heilongjiang
