= Tangjiashan Lake =

Lake in People's Republic of China

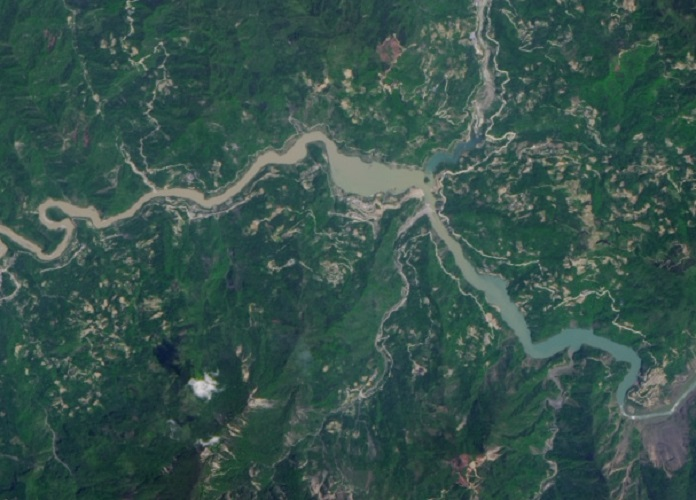
- Tangjiashan Lake on 2016 Landsat imagery

- Location within Sichuan

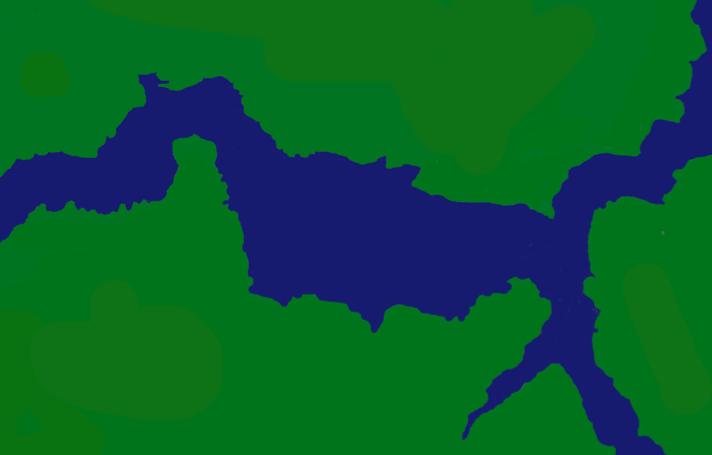
- Map of the lake as of June 3, 2008.
- Location: Beichuan, Sichuan
- Coordinates: 31.8366°N 104.4551°E
- Type: Barrier lake
- Primary inflows: Jian River
- Basin countries: China
- Surface area: 3.78 km^{2} (1.46 mi^{2})
- Water volume: 80×10^{6} m^{3} (2.8×10^{9} ft^{3})

Tangjiashan Lake (Chinese: 唐家山堰塞湖, literally "Tang's Mountain landslide dam-created lake") is a landslide dam-created lake on the Jian River, which was formed by the 2008 Sichuan earthquake. Its name comes from the nearby mountain Tangjiashan. On May 24, 2008, the water level rose by 2 metres (6 ft 7 in) in a single day, reaching a depth of 23 metres (75 ft), just 29 metres (95 ft) below the barrier level. On June 9, 2008, more than 250,000 people had been evacuated from Mianyang in anticipation of the Tangjiashan Lake dam bursting.

A similar lake in the same province formed 222 years earlier caused one of the worst landslide-related disasters in history. On June 10, 1786, a landslide dam on Sichuan's Dadu River, created by an earthquake ten days earlier, burst and caused a flood that extended 1400 km downstream and killed 100,000 people.

A "relatively strong" aftershock on June 8, 2008, shook the massive earthquake-formed lake that has been threatening to flood more than 1 million people and triggered landslides in surrounding mountains. Soldiers used digging equipment, explosives, and even missiles to blast channels in the dam in an attempt to relieve the pressure behind it.

== History ==
The flow from the sluice channel cut into the dam increased dramatically on June 10, 2008, going from 300 cubic metres/second to 7000 cubic metres/second in the span of four hours. The muddy waters flowed rapidly downstream causing flooding in the evacuated town of Beichuan and overtopping of dams.

Starting in June 2009, the lake was stabilized by strengthening the banks to prevent new landslides. In 2012, a discharge channel was finished, allowing the water level in the lake to be controlled.

In 2013 broken banks from a severe flood caused the lake's water to fall to 503 metres above sea level, 40 metres below its peak and 9 metres below its 2010 level. As water receded, the Xuanping town in Sichuan was revealed.

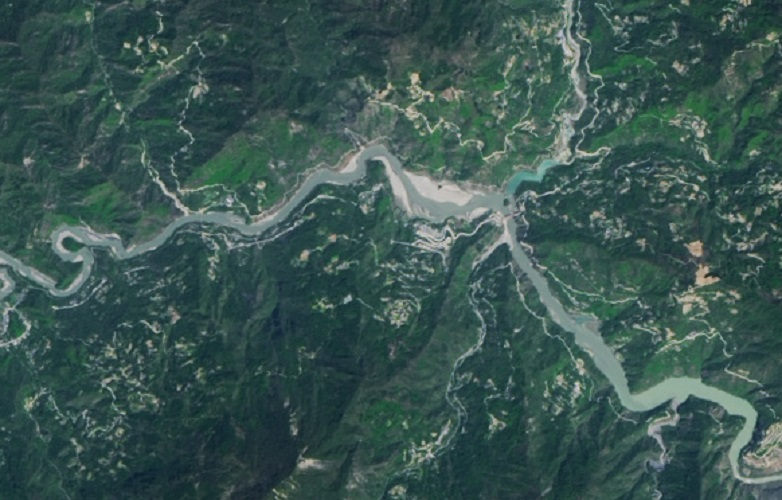
Tangjiashan Lake in 2018, showing greatly reduced area.

The lake is now within the Beichuan Earthquake Museum. Landsat imagery from 2018 showed that the lake's size was greatly reduced due to natural erosion of the barrier and filling of the lake with sediment.

As of 2018, there were plans to convert the lake to a controlled hydropower reservoir.

== See also ==
- Natural disasters in China
