= Wuzhong, Ningxia =

Wuzhong 吴忠市 · وُجْو شِ Wuchung
- Prefecture-level city
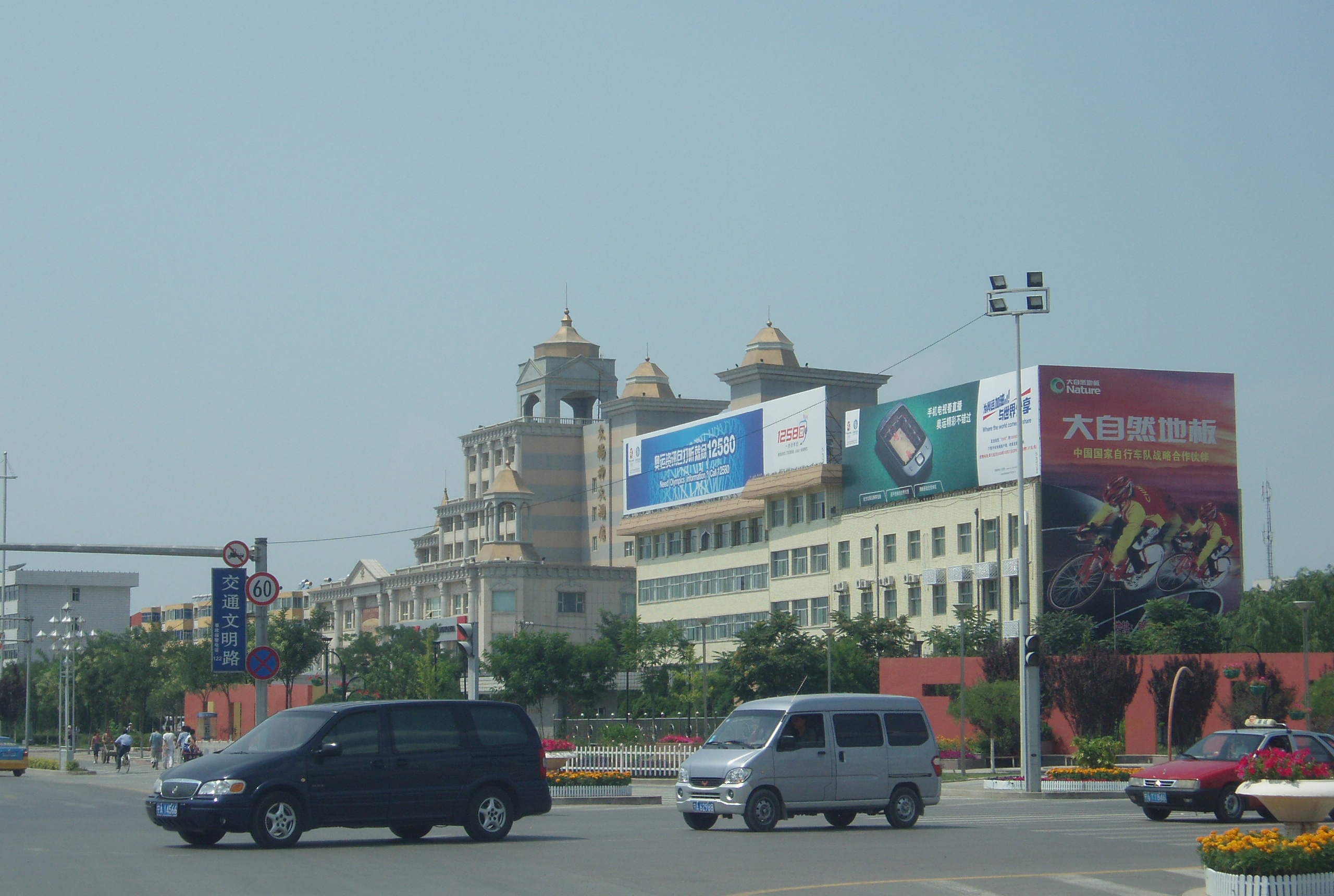
- Wuzhong City

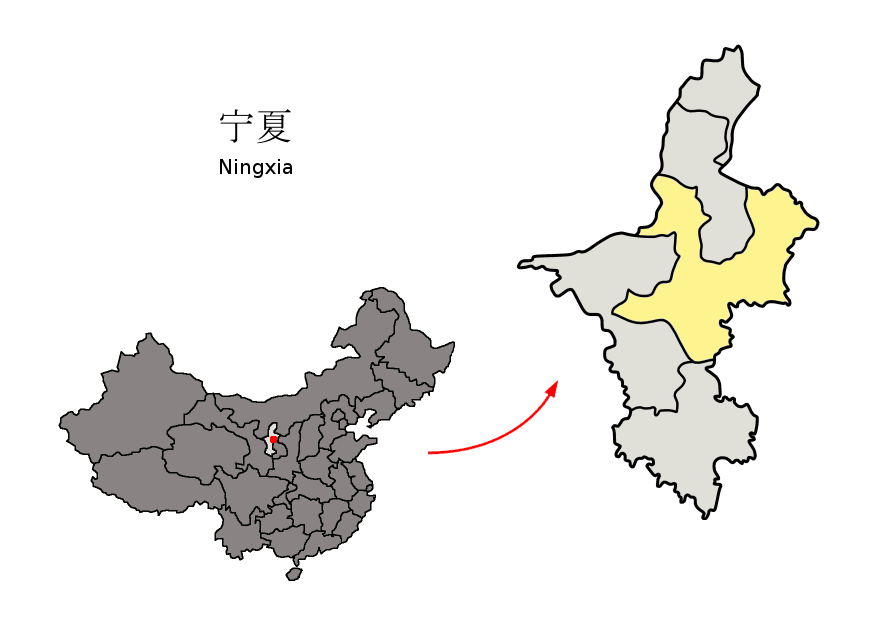
- Location of Wuzhong City jurisdiction in Ningxia

- Location of the city centre in Ningxia
- Coordinates (Wuzhong municipal government): 37°59′52″N 106°11′55″E
- Country: People's Republic of China
- Autonomous region: Ningxia
- Municipal seat: Litong District

Population
  - Prefecture-level city: 1,415,400
  - Urban: 722,400

GDP (nominal) (2025)
  - Prefecture-level city: CN¥ 96.2 billion US$ 13.5 billion
  - Per capita: CN¥ 67,900; US$ 9,506
- Time zone: UTC+8 (China Standard)
- ISO 3166 code: CN-NX-03
- Website: www.wuzhong.gov.cn

Wuzhong (simplified Chinese: 吴忠; traditional Chinese: 吳忠; pinyin: Wúzhōng; Xiao'erjing: وُجْو شِ) is a prefecture-level city in the Ningxia autonomous region of the People's Republic of China. It was known as Yinnan Prefecture (银南地区; 銀南地區; Yínnán Dìqū; Xiao'erjing: ءٍنًا دِٿِيُوِ) before it was upgraded to a prefecture-level city in 1998. Wuzhong is located in the Northwest of China, with the Yellow River flowing through the center of the city.In 2019, Wuzhong had a population of 1.4 million. By the end of 2024, the resident population of the city was 1,415,300, an increase of 12,600 over the end of the previous year, including 833,100 residents in urban areas.

== Administrative divisions ==
Map
Name	Hanzi	Hanyu Pinyin	Xiao'erjing	Population(2010)	Area (km^{2})	Density (/km^{2})
Litong District	利通区	Lìtōng Qū	لِ‌طْو ٿِيُوِ	379,346	1,415	268.0
Hongsibu District	红寺堡区	Hóngsìbù Qū	خْوسِْ‌بَوْ ٿِيُوِ	165,016	3,523	46.8
Qingtongxia City	青铜峡市	Qīngtóngxiá Shì	ٿٍْ‌طْوثِيَا شِ	264,717	2,337	113.3
Yanchi County	盐池县	Yánchí Xiàn	يًاچِ ثِيًا	146,560	8,558	17.1
Tongxin County	同心县	Tóngxīn Xiàn	طْوثٍ ثِيًا	318,153	8,184	38.9

== History ==
During the early and mid-19th century, the territory of today's Wuzhong—as well as much of the northern Ningxia—became a stronghold of the Jahriyya Sufi order (menhuan), which was headquartered in the town of Jinjipu (a few km south of today's Wuzhong's main urban area). Under the leadership of the order's fourth and fifth shaykhs, Ma Yide (the 1770s-1849) and Ma Hualong (d. 1871), it grew wealthy from the profits of caravan trade across Inner Mongolia, between Baotou, Huhhot and Beijing. Jinjipu became an important commercial and religious center.

== Religion ==
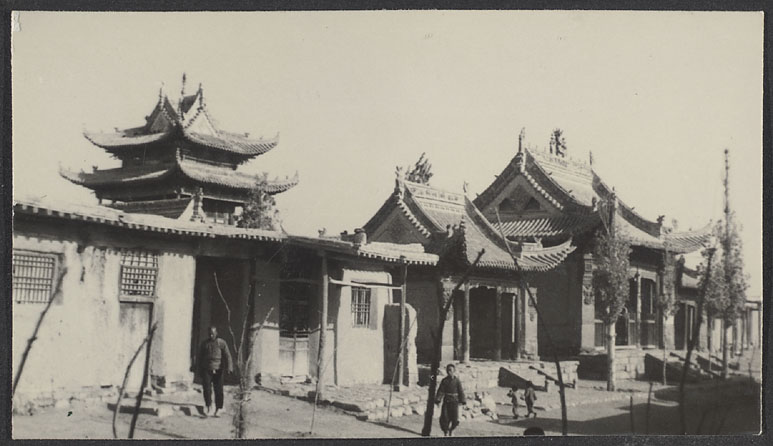
The entrance and minaret of the old Weizhou Grand Mosque during the 1930s

The region features many mosques with unique architecture and different styles everywhere. Wuzhong is one of the main settlements of Hui people in Ningxia. In 2019, there were 778,700 Hui people in the city, accounting for 54% of the total population of the city. Mosques are the main places for Hui people to worship and public activities, and play an important role for the Muslim population.

Weizhou Grand Mosque was constructed during the Ming dynasty in a traditional Chinese palatial style. It was named by the American Episcopal missionary Charles L. Pickens, Jr., who traveled western China in the 1920-1930s and documented many places and people, as "one of the most beautiful in all China." It was destroyed during the Cultural Revolution in the 1960s.

During the Muslim Rebellion of 1862–1877, Jinjipu became the headquarters of the rebels in the Ningxia region. The town fell to Zuo Zongtang's troops in January 1871, and over a thousand rebels and residents were massacred; Ma Hualong with his family and Jahriyya officials were executed in March 1871.

== Geography ==
Wuzhong city is located in the middle of Ningxia Hui Autonomous Region, south of Zhongwei, north of Yinchuan, east of the Dingbian County in the Shaanxi province, on the northeast and northwest Inner Mongolia's Otog Front Banner and Alxa League, on the southeast is Gansu's Qingyang.

Wuzhong city is long from east to west and narrow from north to south. The topography is high in the south and low in the north, with Yinchuan plain in the north and Qingtongxia plain and hilly land in the south. The river plains have an average elevation of 1100 meters, the southern area an elevation of 1300–1900 meters. The city's area consists of parts of the Loess Plateau, Ordos Plateau, Yellow River alluvial plains and mountains. The northern two counties are mostly alluvial plains, the east is located on the Ordos Plateau and includes part of the Maowusu Desert. The southern area is located partially on the Ordos Plateau and partially on the loess plateau.

The Yellow River is the most important river in Wuzhong, it flows through the northern two counties of Qingtongxia and Litong. Since the Qin and Han dynasties irrigation channels have been built, having a history of 2000 years. Agricultural production consist mainly of wheat, rice, fruits and vegetables. Wuzhong is Ningxia's main grain production base.

The Loess Plateau in the south, suitable for forestry and animal husbandry, is an important origin of Ningxia Tanyang and Shaimao goats. The main mountain ranges are Luoshan. and Niushoushan, among which Luoshan is one of the three natural forests in Ningxia.

Wuzhong has oil, gas, coal and limestone reserves.

== Climate ==
The urban area of Wuzhong has a cool arid climate (Köppen BWk) virtually identical to that of Yinchuan, but the more mountainous and higher southern part of the city, exemplified by Mahuangshanxiang, has either a cool semi-arid climate (BSk) or a monsoonal humid continental climate (Dwb). As is typical of northern China, summers are very warm to hot depending on altitude while winters are freezing to frigid but clear with very light snowfall due to the dominance of the Siberian High.

Climate data for Wuzhong, elevation 1,127 m (3,698 ft), (1991–2020 normals, extremes 1981–2017)
Month	Jan	Feb	Mar	Apr	May	Jun	Jul	Aug	Sep	Oct	Nov	Dec	Year
Record high °C (°F)	12.6 (54.7)	22.0 (71.6)	27.4 (81.3)	35.4 (95.7)	36.8 (98.2)	37.7 (99.9)	41.0 (105.8)	37.4 (99.3)	35.8 (96.4)	29.2 (84.6)	23.4 (74.1)	16.3 (61.3)	41.0 (105.8)
Mean daily maximum °C (°F)	1.0 (33.8)	6.1 (43.0)	13.1 (55.6)	20.8 (69.4)	25.7 (78.3)	29.6 (85.3)	31.2 (88.2)	29.3 (84.7)	24.4 (75.9)	18.0 (64.4)	9.5 (49.1)	2.4 (36.3)	17.6 (63.7)
Daily mean °C (°F)	−5.7 (21.7)	−1.2 (29.8)	5.7 (42.3)	13.2 (55.8)	18.5 (65.3)	22.9 (73.2)	24.7 (76.5)	22.8 (73.0)	17.5 (63.5)	10.6 (51.1)	3.0 (37.4)	−3.8 (25.2)	10.7 (51.2)
Mean daily minimum °C (°F)	−10.7 (12.7)	−6.8 (19.8)	−0.2 (31.6)	6.5 (43.7)	11.9 (53.4)	16.8 (62.2)	19.2 (66.6)	17.6 (63.7)	12.3 (54.1)	5.2 (41.4)	−1.5 (29.3)	−8.2 (17.2)	5.2 (41.3)
Record low °C (°F)	−23.5 (−10.3)	−22.0 (−7.6)	−16.0 (3.2)	−5.8 (21.6)	−2.6 (27.3)	7.2 (45.0)	10.5 (50.9)	9.4 (48.9)	−0.5 (31.1)	−8.3 (17.1)	−14.8 (5.4)	−22.4 (−8.3)	−23.5 (−10.3)
Average precipitation mm (inches)	1.3 (0.05)	2.1 (0.08)	5.1 (0.20)	9.2 (0.36)	19.6 (0.77)	26.5 (1.04)	38.4 (1.51)	41.4 (1.63)	30.0 (1.18)	12.7 (0.50)	4.5 (0.18)	0.7 (0.03)	191.5 (7.53)
Average precipitation days (≥ 0.1 mm)	1.5	1.1	2.1	3.3	4.7	5.7	7.4	7.4	6.7	4.1	1.9	0.8	46.7
Average snowy days	3.0	1.8	1.6	0.5	0	0	0	0	0	0.3	1.6	1.4	10.2
Average relative humidity (%)	48	42	39	36	42	49	56	62	62	56	54	50	50
Mean monthly sunshine hours	205.4	210.0	247.1	269.6	300.9	298.5	295.9	268.6	230.4	245.9	219.4	211.0	3,002.7
Percentage possible sunshine	67	68	66	68	68	68	66	65	63	72	73	72	68
Source: China Meteorological Administration

Climate data for Mahuangshanxiang, Wuzhong County, elevation 1,691 m (5,548 ft), (1991–2020 normals)
Month	Jan	Feb	Mar	Apr	May	Jun	Jul	Aug	Sep	Oct	Nov	Dec	Year
Mean daily maximum °C (°F)	−1.6 (29.1)	2.4 (36.3)	8.8 (47.8)	15.9 (60.6)	21.1 (70.0)	25.3 (77.5)	26.7 (80.1)	24.5 (76.1)	19.3 (66.7)	13.3 (55.9)	6.5 (43.7)	0.0 (32.0)	13.5 (56.3)
Daily mean °C (°F)	−7.2 (19.0)	−3.6 (25.5)	2.5 (36.5)	9.5 (49.1)	14.7 (58.5)	19.2 (66.6)	20.8 (69.4)	19.0 (66.2)	14.0 (57.2)	7.7 (45.9)	0.8 (33.4)	−5.5 (22.1)	7.7 (45.8)
Mean daily minimum °C (°F)	−11.3 (11.7)	−8.0 (17.6)	−2.3 (27.9)	3.8 (38.8)	8.9 (48.0)	13.6 (56.5)	15.8 (60.4)	14.6 (58.3)	9.9 (49.8)	3.5 (38.3)	−3.3 (26.1)	−9.6 (14.7)	3.0 (37.3)
Average precipitation mm (inches)	3.4 (0.13)	3.9 (0.15)	8.0 (0.31)	16.0 (0.63)	28.1 (1.11)	44.6 (1.76)	69.7 (2.74)	85.8 (3.38)	49.0 (1.93)	22.0 (0.87)	7.6 (0.30)	1.6 (0.06)	339.7 (13.37)
Average precipitation days (≥ 0.1 mm)	3.3	3.4	4.5	4.8	6.5	8.1	10.4	10.7	9.3	6.0	3.9	1.9	72.8
Average snowy days	4.9	4.9	4.2	1.3	0.2	0	0	0	0	1.5	3.9	3.2	24.1
Average relative humidity (%)	51	50	45	41	44	50	62	69	69	61	53	50	54
Mean monthly sunshine hours	226.1	214.5	249.3	265.6	285.3	280.6	268.5	245.1	203.2	218.5	216.2	225.3	2,898.2
Percentage possible sunshine	73	70	67	67	65	64	61	59	55	64	72	76	66
Source: China Meteorological Administration

== Economy ==
As of 2025, Wuzhong had a GDP of CN¥96.167 billion (US$13.463 billion) and a GDP per capita of CN¥67,900 (US$9,506).

At present, Wuzhong has eight industries: Energy and Power Industry, New Material industry, Milk industry, Wine industry, Construction Materials industry, Paper industry, Fur and Plush industry, Grass and Livestock industry.

Energy and power industry: At present, the total installed capacity of the city's energy and power industry reaches 1.55 million KW, reaching 3.5 million KW in 2008.

New material industry (aluminum, magnesium, PVC, etc.): It has the production capacity of 280,000 tons of electrolytic aluminum, 25,000 tons of magnesium metal and 100,000 tons of PVC resin, which will increase threefold in 2008.

Dairy industry: There are 15 dairy products processing enterprises, accounting for more than half of Ningxia's production capacity. By 2008, the output value of the dairy industry has exceeded 6 billion yuan.

Wine industry: At present, the production of wine accounts for 50% of the region. By 2008, the output value of the wine industry has exceeded 2 billion yuan.

Building materials industry: At present, cement output in the building materials industry reaches 3.5 million tons, and the cement production capacity of the whole city reaches 6.6 million tons in 2008.

Paper industry: Wuzhong has formed Yuhua paper industry, Xiaguang paper industry, Wuzhong paper mill and other paper enterprises with a certain scale. By 2008, the papermaking capacity of the whole region can reach 280,000 tons, and the output value of the papermaking industry can reach 1.1 billion yuan.

Fur plush industry: At present, non-plush production accounts for 60% of the total volume of the district. By 2008, the annual production capacity of non-plush with Tongxin county as the focus has reached 3000 tons.

Grass and livestock industry: By 2008, the high-quality forage planting area of the sheep and livestock industry focusing on Yanchi, Tongxin and Hongsibao has reached 4 million mu, the sheep raising quantity has reached 6 million, 200,000 beef cattle, and the output value of the grass and livestock industry has reached 1 billion yuan.

=== Local products ===
- Licorice
- Cashmere
- Hand caught lamb chop
- Goji
- Helan stone
- Xige Estate Ningxia wine

== Notable residents ==
- Shi Tao, journalist, writer, and poet
- Zhou Shengxian, the director of the State Forestry Administration, is from Wuzhong.

== Transportation ==
- China National Highway 211
- Taiyuan-Zhongwei Railway (Limited service in Hongsibu District and Yanchi county)
- Baotou-Lanzhou Railway (Over 20 daily trains bounding for nationwide destinations, station in Qingtongxia City)
- Dingbian-Yinchuan Railway (7 daily trains, station in Yanchi County)
