= List of Major National Historical and Cultural Sites in Ningxia =

This list is of Major Sites Protected for their Historical and Cultural Value at the National Level in the autonomous region of Ningxia, People's Republic of China.

Site	Date	Location	Image	Coordinates	Designation
Haibao Pagoda 海宝塔	Qing	Yinchuan	Upload file	38°29′33″N 106°16′52″E	1-76
Xumishan Grottoes 须弥山石窟	Northern dynasties to Tang	Yuanzhou District, Guyuan	Upload file	36°16′50″N 105°59′11″E	2-12
Tongxin Great Mosque 同心清真大寺	Qing	Tongxin County	Upload file	36°57′52″N 105°54′52″E	3-136
Twin pagodas of Baisikou 拜寺口双塔	Western Xia	Helan County	Upload file	38°40′52″N 105°57′48″E	3-154
One Hundred and Eight Stupas 一百零八塔	Western Xia	Qingtongxia	Upload file	37°52′27″N 105°58′43″E	3-155
Shuidonggou Site 水洞沟遗址	Paleolithic	Lingwu	Upload file	38°16′17″N 106°31′20″E	3-185
Western Xia mausoleums 西夏陵	Western Xia	Yinchuan	Upload file	38°25′45″N 105°59′52″E	3-248
Rock Art of the Helan Mountains 贺兰山岩画		Helan County	Upload file	38°44′37″N 106°01′10″E	4-193
Kaicheng Site 开城遗址	Yuan	Yuanzhou District, Guyuan	Upload file		5-128
Great Wall of Qin 长城 秦长城遗址	Warring States	Pengyang County, Xiji County, Yuanzhou District, Guyuan	Upload file		5-442(2)
Gezishan Site 鸽子山遗址	Paleolithic	Qingtongxia	Upload file	38°01′23″N 105°51′36″E	6-213
Caiyuan Site 菜园遗址	Neolithic	Haiyuan County	Upload file		6-214
Zhaobishan Copper Mine Site 照壁山铜矿遗址	Han	Zhongwei	Upload file	37°41′56″N 105°22′17″E	6-215
Lingwu Kiln 灵武窑址	Song to Ming	Lingwu	Upload file	38°05′37″N 106°20′12″E	6-216
Zhangjiachang Site 张家场城址	Han	Yanchi County	Upload file	37°25′50″N 106°51′53″E	6-217
Chengtian Temple Pagoda 承天寺塔	Qing	Yinchuan	Upload file	38°27′47″N 106°15′55″E	6-807
Dong Residence 董府	Qing	Wuzhong	Upload file	37°55′24″N 106°05′07″E	6-808
Jiangtaibao Revolution Site 将台堡革命旧址	1936	Xiji County	Upload file	35°49′12″N 105°50′14″E	6-1076
Yehezi Site 页河子遗址	Neolithic	Longde County	Upload file		7-0485
Guyuan City Site 固原古城遗址	Han to Qing	Guyuan	Upload file		7-0486
Shengwei Cheng Site 省嵬城址	Song	Shizuishan	Upload file		7-0487
Qiying Beizui Cheng Site 七营北嘴城址	Song to Ming	Haiyuan County	Upload file	36°33′57″N 106°12′22″E	7-0488
Liuzhou Cheng Site 柳州城址	Song to Ming	Haiyuan County	Upload file	36°32′28″N 105°36′52″E	7-0489
Daying Cheng Site 大营城址	Song to Ming	Yuanzhou District, Guyuan	Upload file		7-0490
Xingwuying Cheng Site 兴武营城址	Qing	Yanchi County	Upload file		7-0491
Guyuan Northern Dynasties, Sui, and Tang Cemetery 固原北朝隋唐墓地	Northern dynasties to Tang	Yuanzhou District, Guyuan	Upload file		7-0691
Xunziliang Tang Tombs 窨子梁唐墓	Tang	Yanchi County	Upload file		7-0692
Hongfo Pagoda 宏佛塔	Western Xia	Helan County	Upload file	38°34′20″N 106°25′38″E	7-1481
Kangji Temple Pagoda 康济寺塔	Song to Ming	Tongxin County	Upload file	37°16′54″N 106°28′53″E	7-1482
Mingshazhou Pagoda 鸣沙洲塔	Ming	Zhongning County	Upload file	37°33′13″N 105°52′00″E	7-1483
Yinchuan Yuhuang Pavilion 银川玉皇阁	Qing	Yinchuan	Upload file	38°27′53″N 106°17′03″E	7-1484
Najiahu Mosque 纳家户清真寺	Qing	Yongning County	Upload file	38°16′57″N 106°14′30″E	7-1485
Tianzhou Pagoda 田州塔	Qing	Pingluo County	Upload file	38°45′03″N 106°28′52″E	7-1486
Pingluo Yuhuang Pavilion 平罗玉皇阁	Qing to Republic of China	Pingluo County	Upload file	38°54′36″N 106°32′44″E	7-1487
Zhongwei Gaomiao 中卫高庙	Qing to Republic of China	Shapotou District, Zhongwei	Upload file	37°31′21″N 105°11′24″E	7-1488

== See also ==
- Principles for the Conservation of Heritage Sites in China
