= One Hundred and Eight Stupas =

Buddhist stupas in Ningxia, China

Coordinates: 37°52′27″N 105°58′43″E

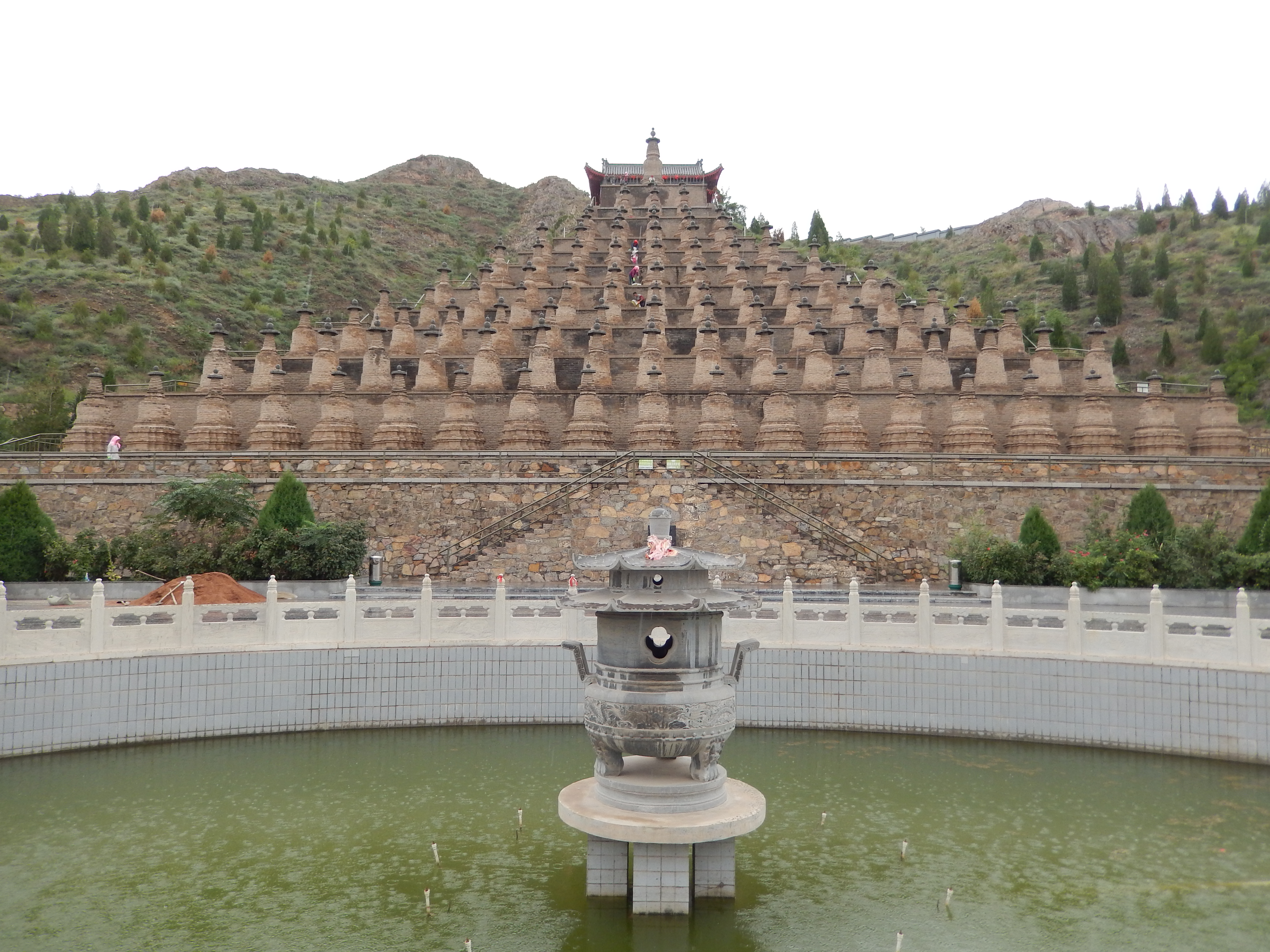
The 108 stupas at Qingtongxia

The One Hundred and Eight Stupas (Chinese: 一百零八塔; pinyin: Yībǎilíngbā Tǎ) is an array of one hundred and eight Buddhist stupas (also called dagobas) on a hillside on the west bank of the Yellow River at Qingtongxia in Ningxia, China. The stupas were originally constructed during the Western Xia, but have been renovated and rebuilt several times over the centuries.

== Description ==
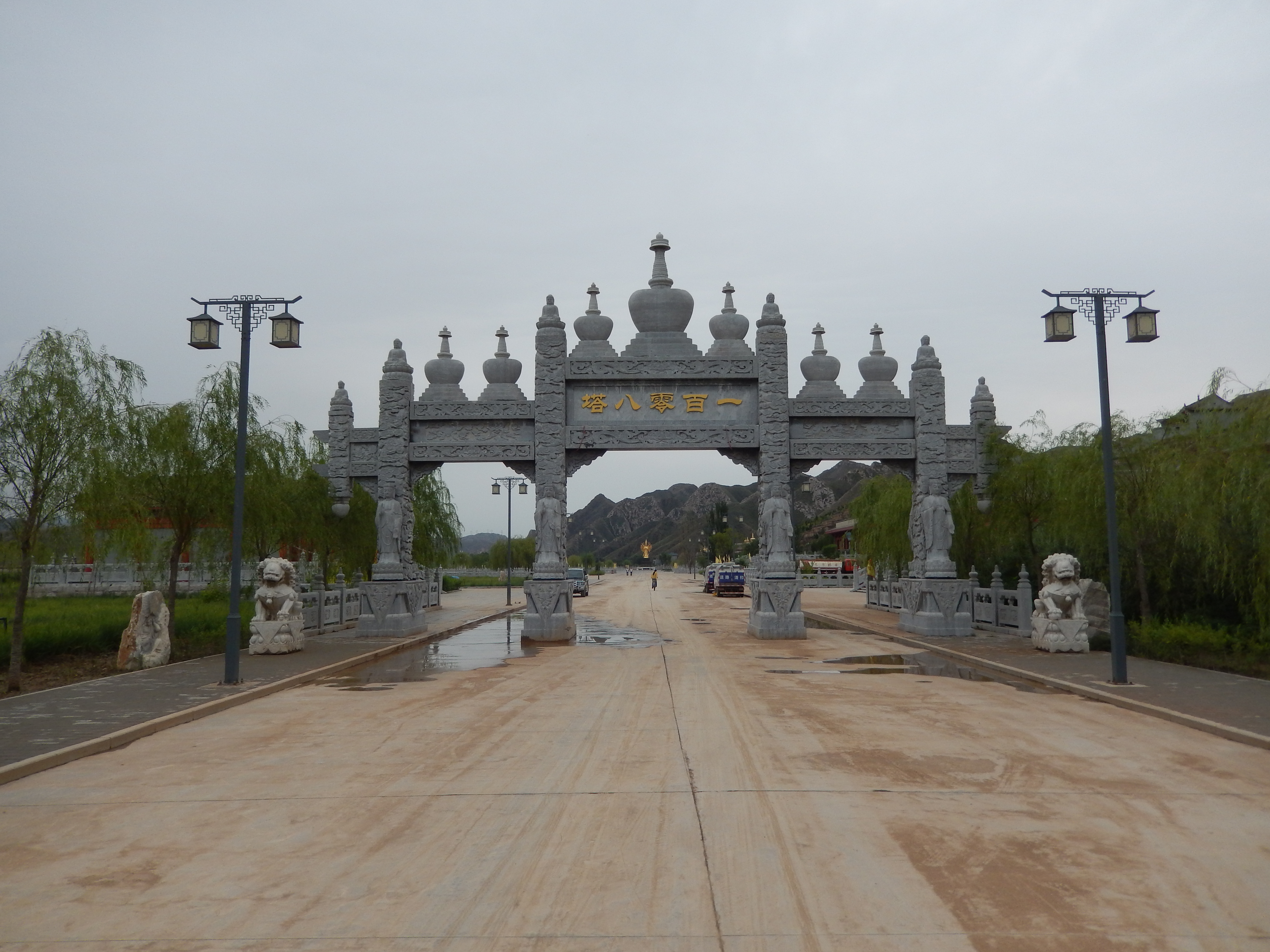
Entrance to the 108 Stupas tourist site

The location of the 108 stupas has been turned into a major tourist site, and a large area of land between the stupas and the Yellow River has been paved over and landscaped with ponds. A number of buildings have been erected on the site, including a tourist reception centre and an exhibition hall. The exhibition hall describes the history of the stupas, and shows photographs of what they looked like when they were investigated and renovated during the 1980s.

The 108 stupas are arrayed in a triangular formation up the side of a hill, facing southeast, overlooking the Yellow River. There is one large stupa at the apex of the triangle, with a Buddhist hall behind it, and below that are eleven rows of one hundred and seven smaller stupas on brick platforms of increasing width running down the hill. The number of stupas on each level is: 1, 3, 3, 5, 5, 7, 9, 11, 13, 15, 17, 19. The reason why there are a 108 stupas is that the number 108 is a sacred number in Buddhism, for example Buddhist rosary beads number 108. Odd numbers are also considered auspicious in Buddhism (so pagodas always have an odd number of storeys), which is why the number of stupas on each row is an odd number.

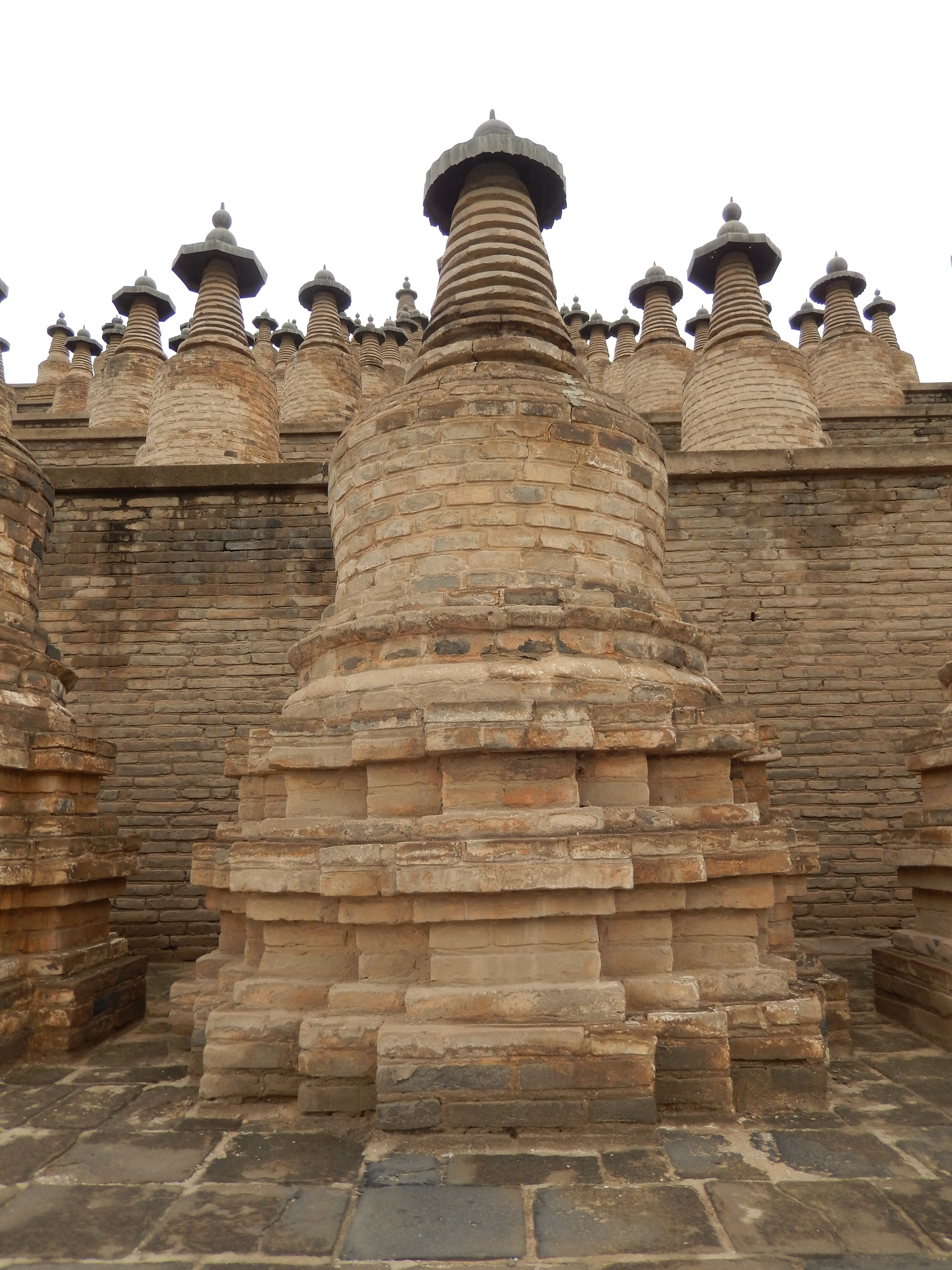
One of the small stupas on the bottom row, showing a ratha-shaped base

The first row of nineteen stupas starts slightly up the hillside, so the bottom platform is 5 metres (16 ft) high. The width of the bottom platform is 54 metres (177 ft), and the height from the bottom platform to the top platform with the large stupa is 31.82 metres (104.4 ft).

The stupas have undergone intensive renovation in recent years, and they do not represent their original Western Xia form, although they are in the original position and formation. In 1987 the small stupas were 2.0–2.5 metres (6.6–8.2 ft) in height, with a diameter of 1.9–2.1 metres (6.2–6.9 ft), but after renovation and the addition of a canopy and finial they are now somewhat taller.

The stupas are all made of brick, with several different designs. The bottom row (19 stupas) and the large stupa at the top have a zigzag ratha-shaped base, whereas the remaining 88 stupas all have an octagonal base. Rows 1 and 12 (20 stupas), rows 2–6 (23 stupas), row 7 (9 stupas), and rows 8–11 (56 stupas) each have slightly different shapes of hemispherical domed stupa body. Whole bricks are used for the stupa base, and half-bricks are used for the body of the stupa.

The original stupa canopies and finials had all been lost by the time the stupas were restored in 1987, but as part of the restoration each stupa is now capped by a lead canopy of several designs (round or octagonal, with one or two balls on the finial).

In 1987 the large stupa was 5.04 metres (16.5 ft) high, with a diameter of 3.08 metres (10.1 ft), but after renovation it is now somewhat taller. Unlike the small stupas, which are all solid, the large stupa has a small opening on the east side, with a small room in the centre. This is currently occupied by a Buddhist statue and an offering box.

== History ==
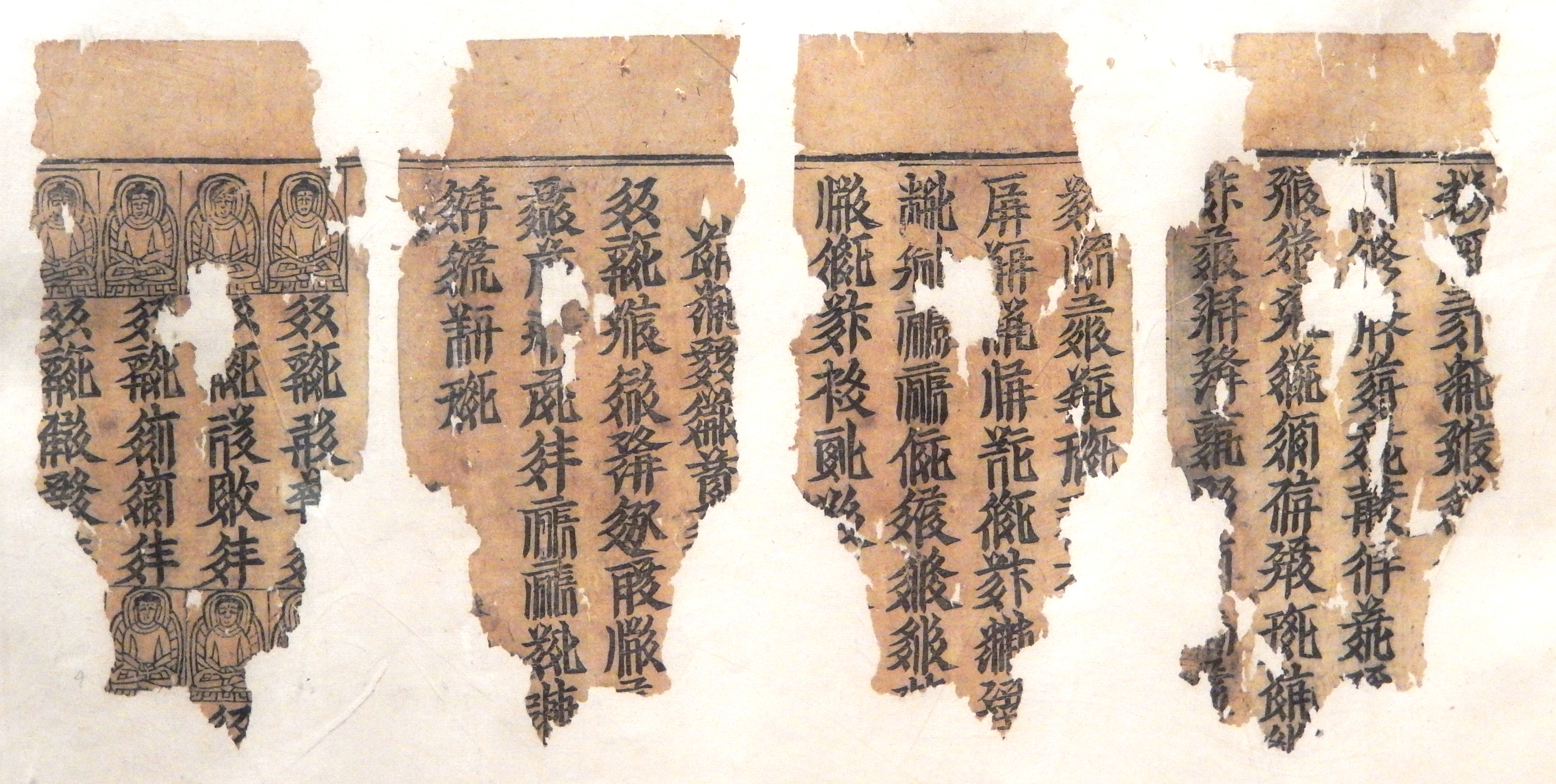
Fragment of the Tangut version of the Thousand Names of the Buddha of the Present (現在賢劫千佛名經) [N11·003], found in 1987–1988

The 108 stupas are believed to have been originally constructed during the period of the Western Xia kingdom (1038–1227), as part of a Buddhist temple complex. The remains of a temple and two small stupas were originally located in front of the 108 stupas, but due to the construction of a dam nearby (which for some years caused the area in front of the stupas to be flooded), in 1958 the two stupas were demolished. Two Western Xia period silk Buddhist paintings were found inside the two stupas, and fragments of Tangut Buddhist texts, miniature terracota stupa models, and clay tsha-tsha (small tablets made of stamped clay) were also found in the vicinity of the temple. Further evidence that the temple complex dates back to the Western Xia comes from an octagonal brick platform (on which a stupa would originally have stood) which is located on the hillside just north of the 108 stupas. In 1987 fragments of Buddhist sutras written in the Tangut script were discovered in this platform, together with about a dozen clay stupa models. Artefacts discovered during the renovation of the 108 stupas included four painted clay Buddhist statues and over a hundred plain and painted clay stupa models (between 5 and 12.5 cm in height) from the large stupa, seven tsha-tsha from two of the small stupas (nos. 17 and 85), a painted clay Buddhist statue from stupa no. 41, and three pottery stupa finials (between 13 and 17.5 cm in height) from stupa no. 101.

During renovation in 1987 it was possible to reconstruct the architectural history of the stupas. The original stupas were made of sun-dried mud bricks surrounding a central wooden supporting pillar. The mud core was coated in white plaster, with lotus flower designs or Sanskrit text painted in red around the base. Later the stupa bases were strengthened, and additional mud was applied to reinforce the stupa body. The stupas were replastered twice during the Yuan and Ming dynasties.

During the early Qing dynasty the stupas underwent a major renovation, and the dilapidated mud stupas were encased in brick to protect them. The brick casing was thinly coated with white plaster several times up to the 1980s.

By 1987, most of the stupas were in a very poor state of repair, with missing brickwork exposing the mud and plaster core. None of the stupas preserved the top part, and in some cases only the stupa base remained. During 1987–1988 the outer brickwork of the stupas (dating to the early Qing dynasty) was repaired and rebuilt using the few relatively complete stupas as models. The white plaster that still covered the brickwork of most of stupas at that time was removed, and the stupas assumed their current form.

== Gallery of artefacts discovered at the 108 stupas ==
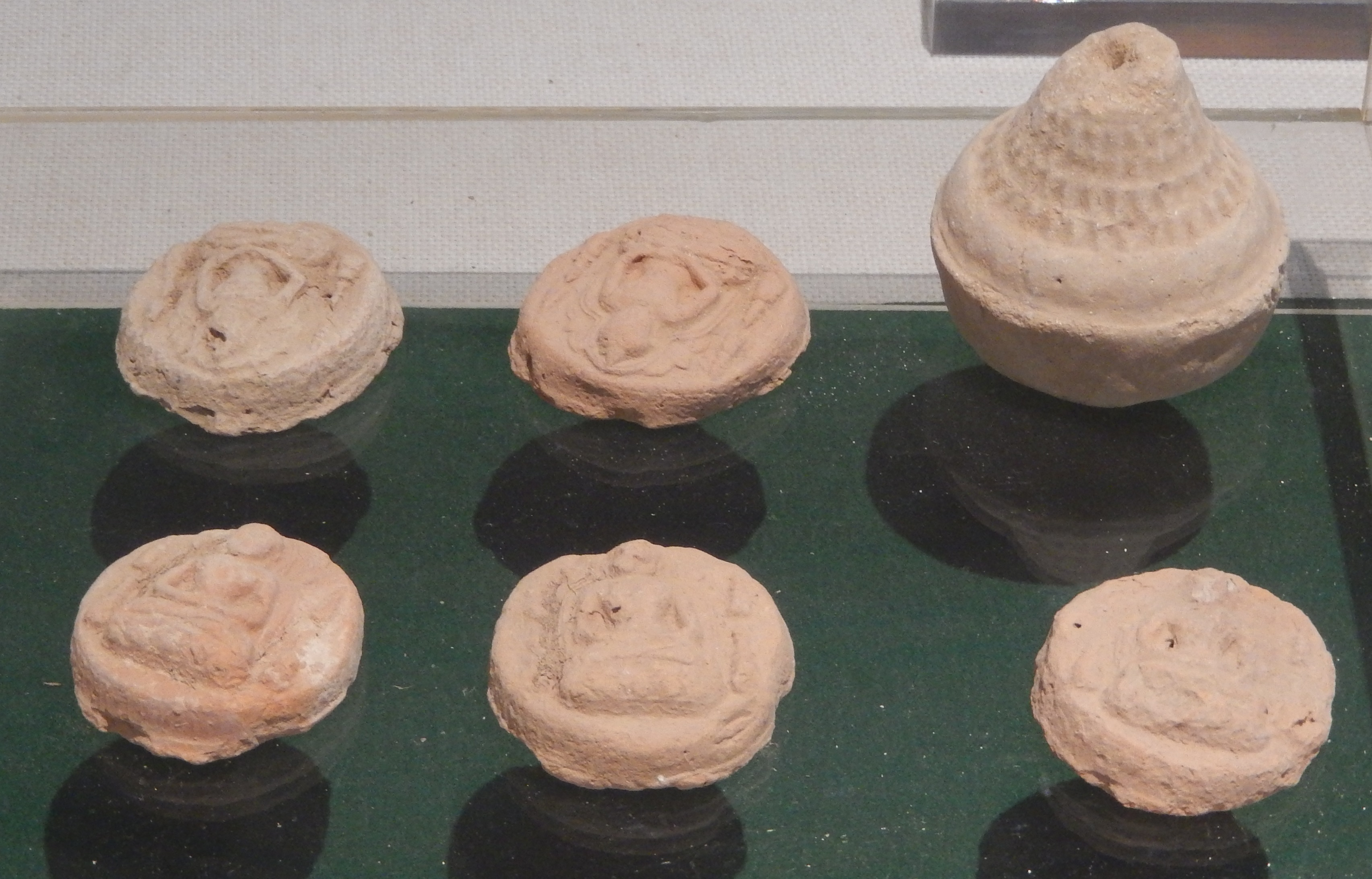
Five clay tsha-tsha and one miniature stupa model

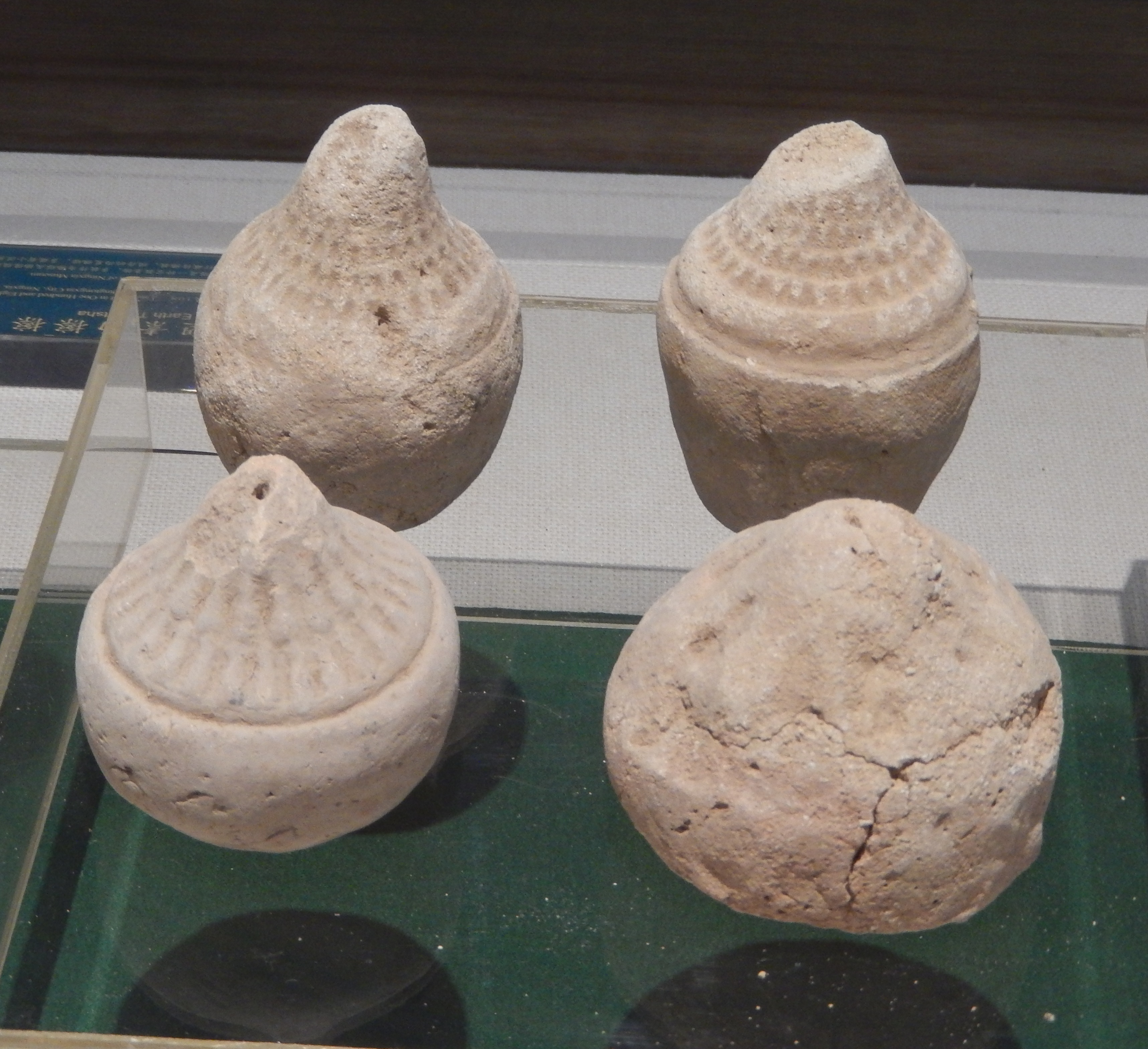
Miniature clay stupa models

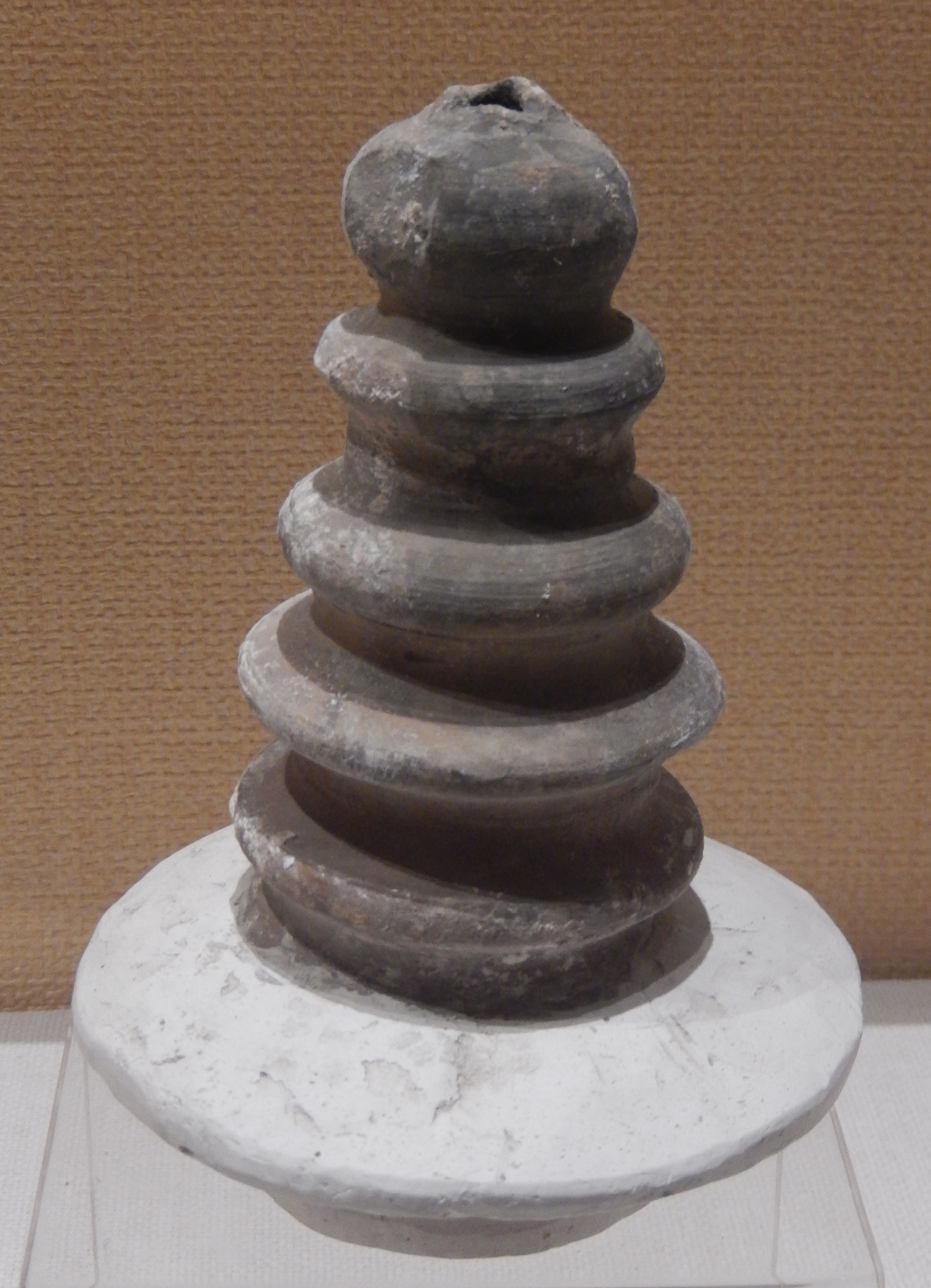
Pottery stupa finial found in Stupa no. 101

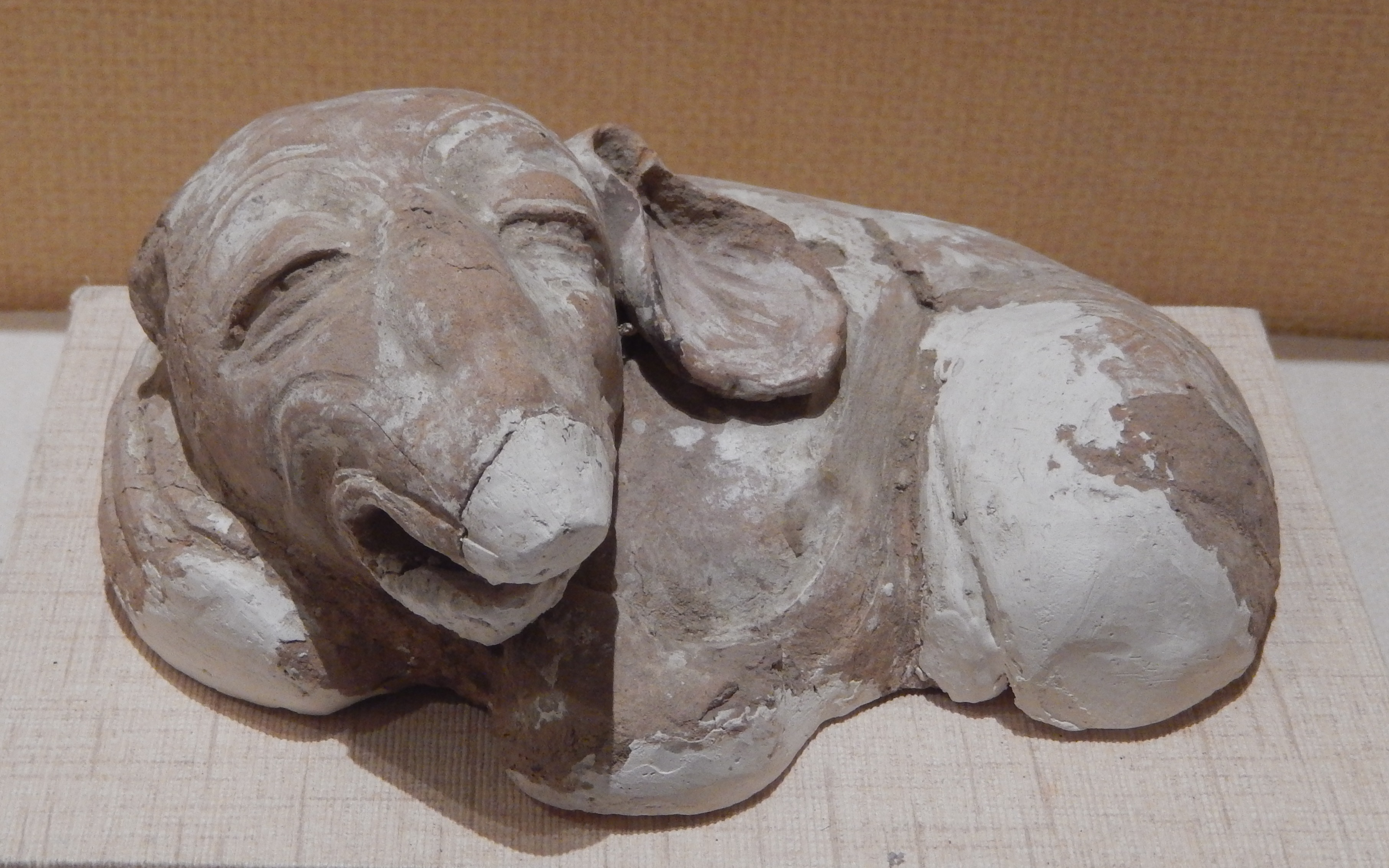
Clay sculpture of an elephant (possibly the base for a statue of the bodhisattva Samantabhadra)

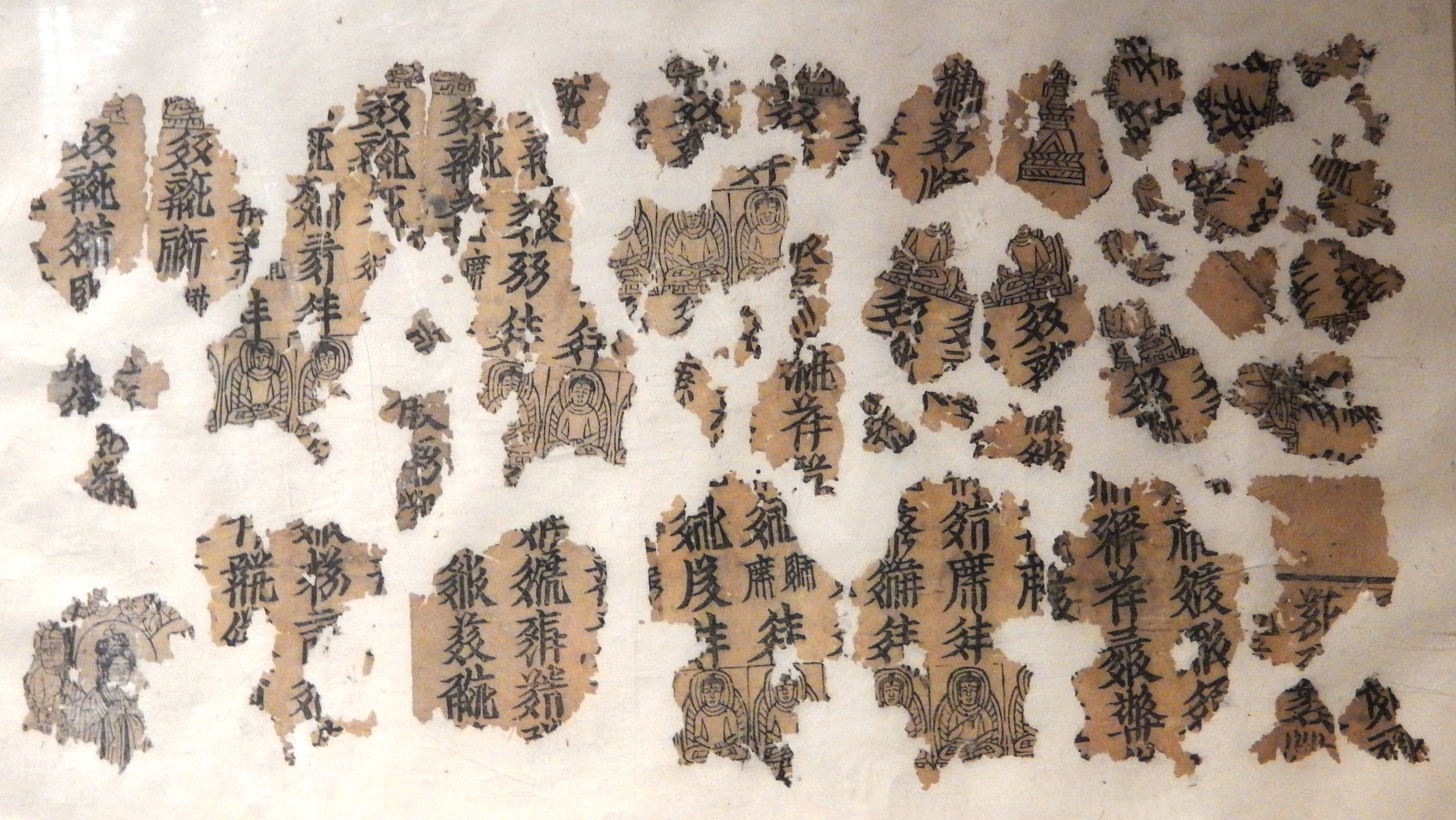
Fragments of a Tangut Buddhist sutra

== See also ==
- Major national historical and cultural sites in Ningxia
- Pagoda of Chengtian Temple
- Hongfo Pagoda
