= Yanchi =

Yanchi may refer to:

- Yanchi County, Wuzhong, Ningxia Hui Autonomous Region, China
- Yanji or Yanchi (延吉市), a city in Jilin Province, China
- Yanchi, Shimen (雁池乡), a township in Shimen County, Hunan, China
