= Yongning Najiahu Mosque =

Mosque in Yinchuan, Ningxia, China

- 纳家户清真寺
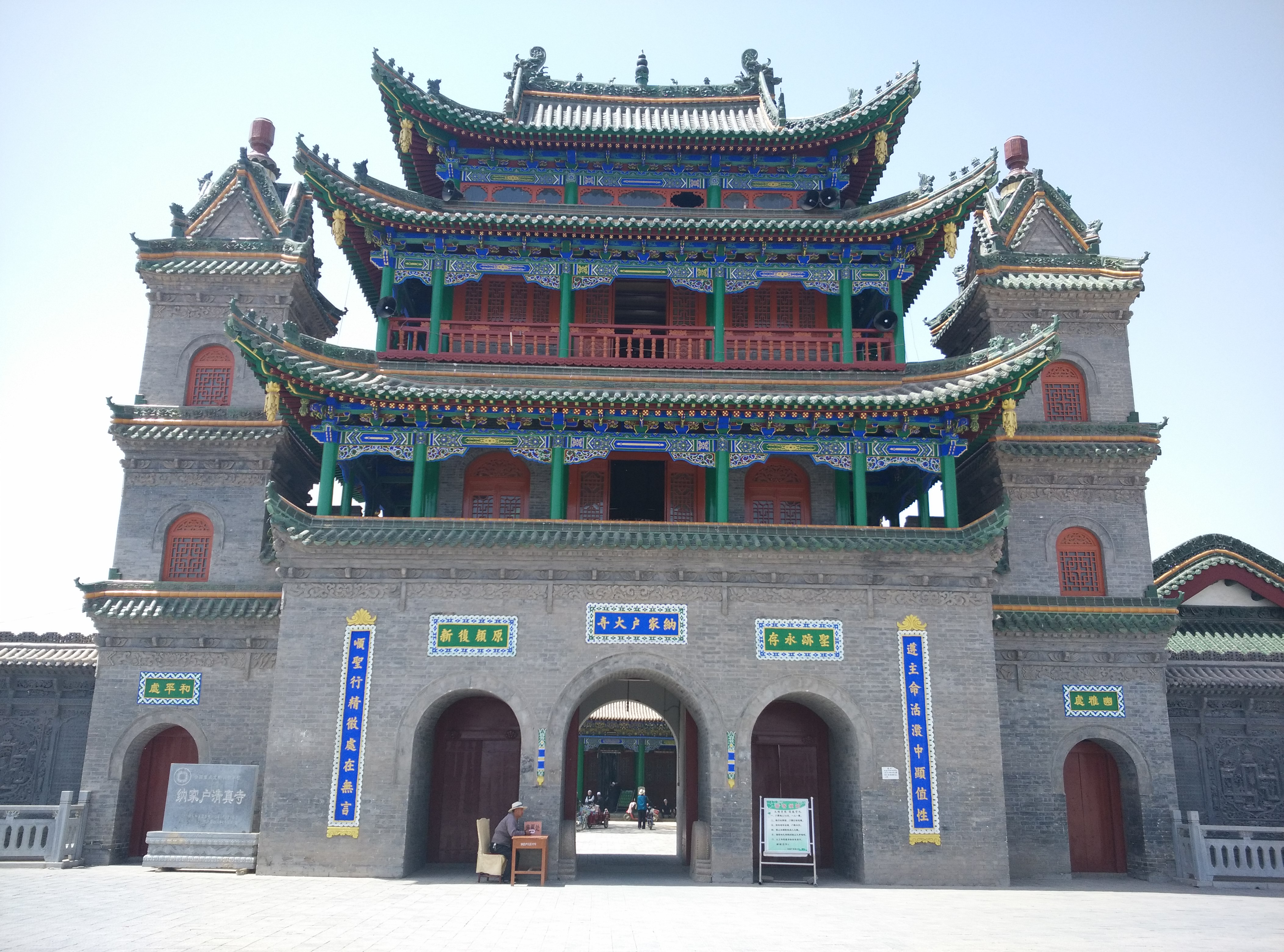

- Location of the mosque in Ningxia

Religion
- Affiliation: Islam
- Ecclesiastical or organizational status: Mosque
- Status: Active

Location
- Location: Yinchuan, Ningxia
- Country: China
- Interactive map of Yongning Najiahu Mosque
- Coordinates: 38°16′58″N 106°14′11″E

Architecture
- Type: Mosque
- Style: Chinese
- Minaret: 2

Major cultural heritage sites under national-level protection
- Official name: Najiahu Mosque 纳家户清真寺
- Type: Cultural
- Criteria: Religion
- Reference no.: 7-1485

Chinese name
- Simplified Chinese: 纳家户清真寺
Transcriptions
Standard Mandarin
- Hanyu Pinyin: Nàjiāhù Qīngzhēnsì

The Yongning Najiahu Mosque, also known as the Najiahu Mosque (Chinese: 纳家户清真寺; pinyin: Nàjiāhù Qīngzhēnsì), is a mosque in Yinchuan, in the Ningxia Hui Autonomous Region of China.

The mosque is listed as a Chinese major cultural heritage site and Premier Li Keqiang visited the mosque in 2016.

== See also ==
- Islam in China
- List of mosques in China
- List of Major National Historical and Cultural Sites in Ningxia
