= Hongfo Pagoda =

Pagoda in Ningxia, China

Coordinates: 38°34′20″N 106°25′38″E

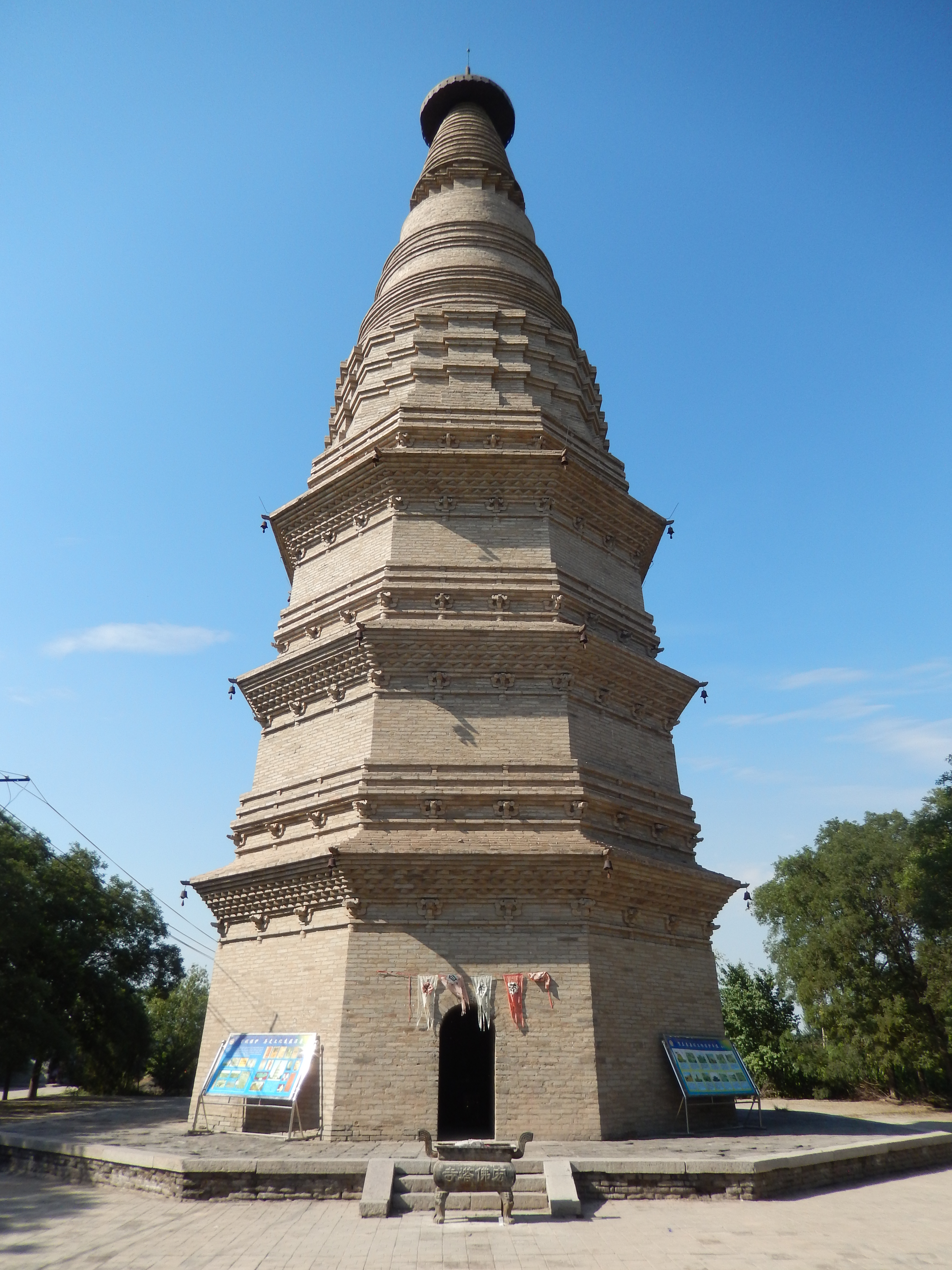
Hongfo Pagoda in Helan County

The Hongfo Pagoda (Chinese: 宏佛塔; pinyin: Hóngfó Tǎ), meaning 'Grand Buddha Pagoda', is an octagonal brick pagoda located in Helan County, just north of Yinchuan city, in Ningxia, China. The pagoda was built during the Western Xia (1038–1227), and when it was renovated in 1990 a number of Western Xia statues and printed texts were discovered.

== History ==
The pagoda is located in the countryside east of Hongxing Village (红星村), Jingui Township (金贵镇), about 5 kilometres (3.1 mi) from Helan city.

Based on the discovery of Western Xia period artefacts and texts during renovation in 1990, it has been determined that the pagoda must date to the Western Xia (1038–1227). Radiocarbon dating and dendrochronology dating have given dates of 1140±100 years BP (^{14}C) and 1080±105 years BP (dendrochronology) for the wooden central pillar, and dates of 1050±90 years BP (^{14}C) and 995±95 years BP (dendrochronology) for wooden beams. These dates would suggest that the pagoda was first constructed before the Western Xia, but based on architectural style and the artifacts found inside the pagoda, it has been dated to the latter part of the Western Xia, during the late 12th or early 13th century (circa 1190–1227).

The pagoda was originally part of a Buddhist monastery, but it is now the only surviving remnant of the temple. Based on the high quality of statues and paintings found in the pagoda, it is thought that the monastery it belonged to must have been high-ranking with imperial patronage. Shi Jinbo suggests that the associated monastery could have been the Dadumin Monastery or the Wenjia Monastery, but there is no evidence for this identification.

A Ming dynasty source mentions the existence of a lake called 'Three-Stupa Lake' located 30 li northeast of the Western Xia capital city, which Lei Runze thinks might be related to the Hongfo Pagoda. Apart from this there are no other surviving historical mentions of Hongfo Pagoda.

The pagoda has been repaired and renovated several times over the centuries, but by the 1980s it was in a fragile state, with the brickwork around the base missing, the pinnacle lost, and large cracks in its structure. In 1987, experts from various institutes were invited to survey the pagoda, and come up with a plan for its restoration. The survey concluded that the pagoda was structurally unsound, and could fall down at any time, so it was decided to take the pagoda down, and rebuild it. The dismantling and rebuilding of the pagoda took place in 1989–1990.

In 1990, a panel of experts voted the discovery of Western Xia artefacts in the pagoda as one of the ten most important archaeological discoveries of the year.

In 1988, the pagoda was listed as an important protected cultural site in Ningxia; and in 2013, the pagoda was listed as a Major Historical and Cultural Site Protected at the National Level.

== Description ==
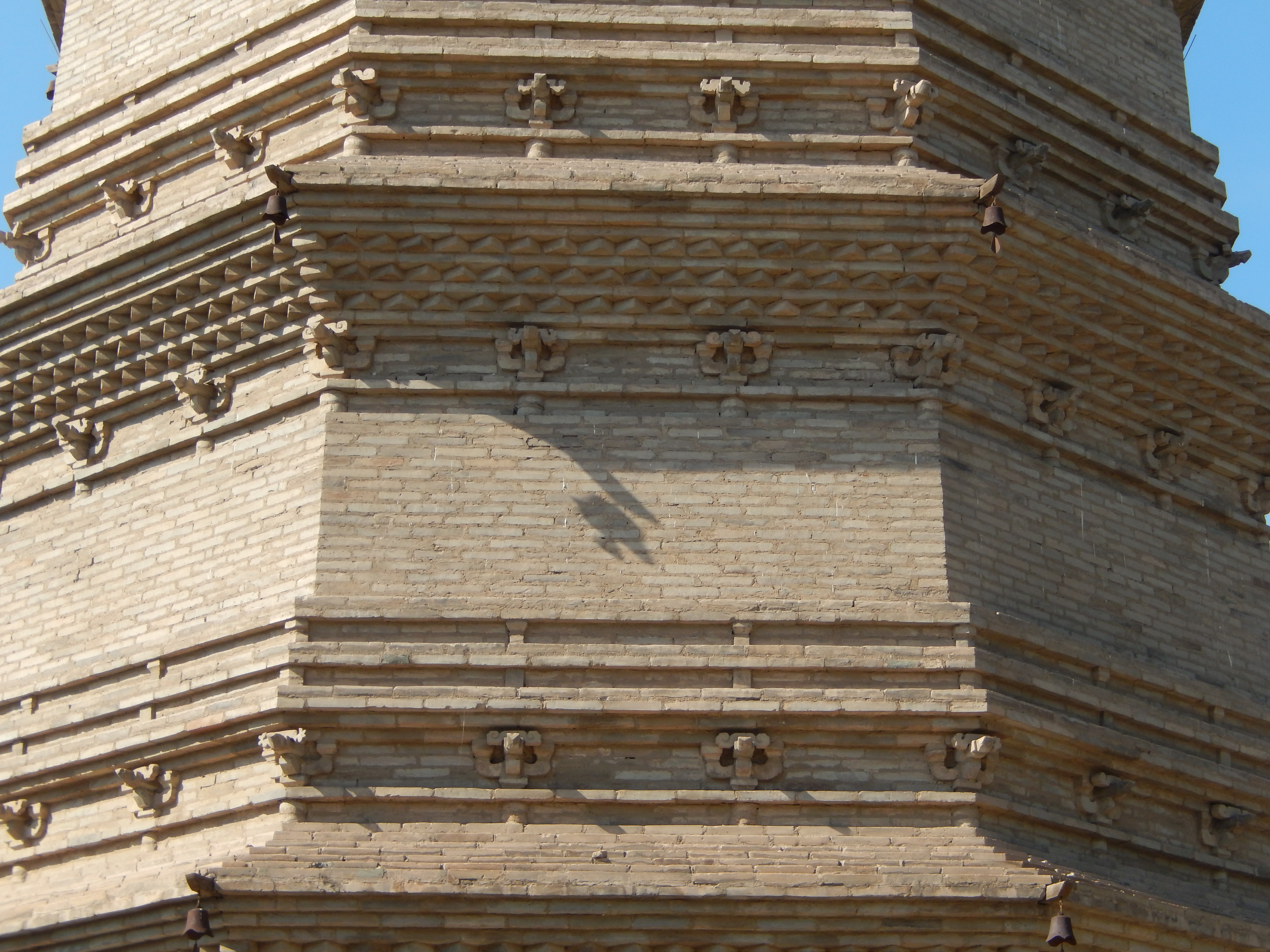
Detail of the second storey of the bottom section

The pagoda has a very unusual form, being divided vertically into two architecturally distinct sections. The lower section is octagonal in shape, with each side 5 metres (16 ft) wide at the base, and comprises three storeys, in total 15.73 metres (51.6 ft) in height. The upper part is shaped like a Tibetan-style stupa with a stepped ratha-shaped base and a hemispherical dome. Before renovation the damaged pagoda was 28.2 metres (93 ft) high, but after renovation (and reconstruction of the lost pinnacle) the pagoda is now 35.0 metres (114.8 ft) in height.

The pagoda was constructed of bricks around a solid clay interior, with a central supporting pillar made of wood. After renovation, it is now hollow, with a small entrance on the south face of the first storey which leads to the hollow interior, which is not partitioned into floors, and reaches up into the top section.

== Artefacts discovered at the pagoda ==
During renovation in 1990, a large number of objects dating to the Western Xia were discovered in a small room at the base of the pinnacle of the pagoda, includes the remains of painted earthenware Buddhist statues and thousands of pieces of wooden printing blocks for Tangut Buddhist texts. Fourteen of the objects discovered have been listed as Class A cultural heritage under national protection. The objects discovered include:

- 6 earthenware sculptures of the heads of Buddhas;
- 2 earthenware sculptures of the faces of Buddhas;
- 2 earthenware sculptures of the faces of wrathful guardians;
- 18 earthenware sculptures of the heads of arhats;
- the bodies and various body parts of 12 earthenware statues of arhats;
- one wooden sculpture of a bodhisattva, 24.4 centimetres (9.6 in) high
- one wooden sculpture of a half-naked female tantric figure, 28.5 centimetres (11.2 in) high;
- the remains of 14 silk paintings, of which seven are Chinese style paintings, and six are Tibetan style thangkas;
- 4 miniature clay models of Buddhas 4 centimetres (1.6 in) high;
- several painted pottery models of stupas;
- a wooden model of a stupa, 17.5 centimetres (6.9 in) high, with a silk ribbon tied to its finial;
- a wooden tablet, 11.2 by 1.9 centimetres (4.41 in × 0.75 in), inscribed with Tangut writing on both sides ("money for the [restoration of the] precious pagoda" on one side, and the names of donors on the other side) [N11·003];
- a fragment of a printed page from the Tangut-Chinese glossary Pearl in the Palm (part of the 6th column of the 4th folio) [N11·001];
- a fragment of a manuscript of a Tangut Buddhist text, with four Tangut characters (the last character means 'Buddha') [N11·002].

In addition, more than 2,000 pieces of wooden printing blocks were discovered in the pagoda, of which 1,068 were engraved with Tangut characters for printing Buddhist sutras. The printing blocks had been subjected to a fire, and so the wood has carbonized to a black colour. Most of the surviving pieces are small fragments with only a few characters on them. Based on the size of the Tangut writing, the woodblocks have been categorized into three types: 1) "large character" woodblocks (each character 1.0–1.2 cm^{2}) [N12·001–017]; 2) "medium character" woodblocks (each character about 1.0 cm^{2}) [N12·018–526]; and 3) "small character" woodblocks (each character about 0.6 cm^{2}) [N12·527–1068]. According to Shi Jinbo the printing blocks for the Tangut translation of the Shì móhēyǎn lùn 釋摩訶衍論 (a Buddhist commentary attributed to Nāgārjuna but now only extant in a Chinese translation) are the oldest surviving text woodblocks in China.

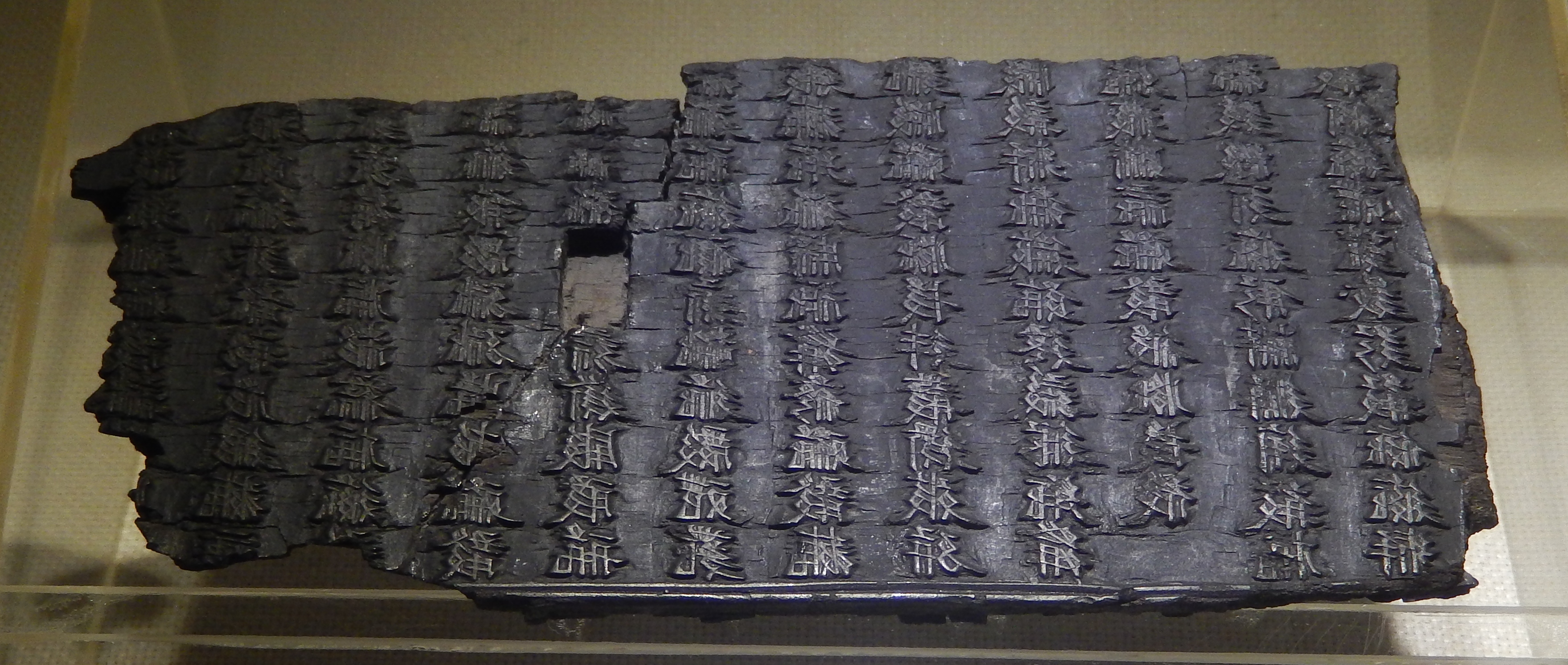
Woodblock for the Tangut translation of the Shì móhēyǎn lùn 釋摩訶衍論 [N12·019]

Eight clay models of stupas were also discovered in a depression in the rammed earth foundations of the stupa. A number of bronze coins dating to the Northern Song were also discovered during restoration of the pagoda.

=== Gallery of discovered artefacts ===
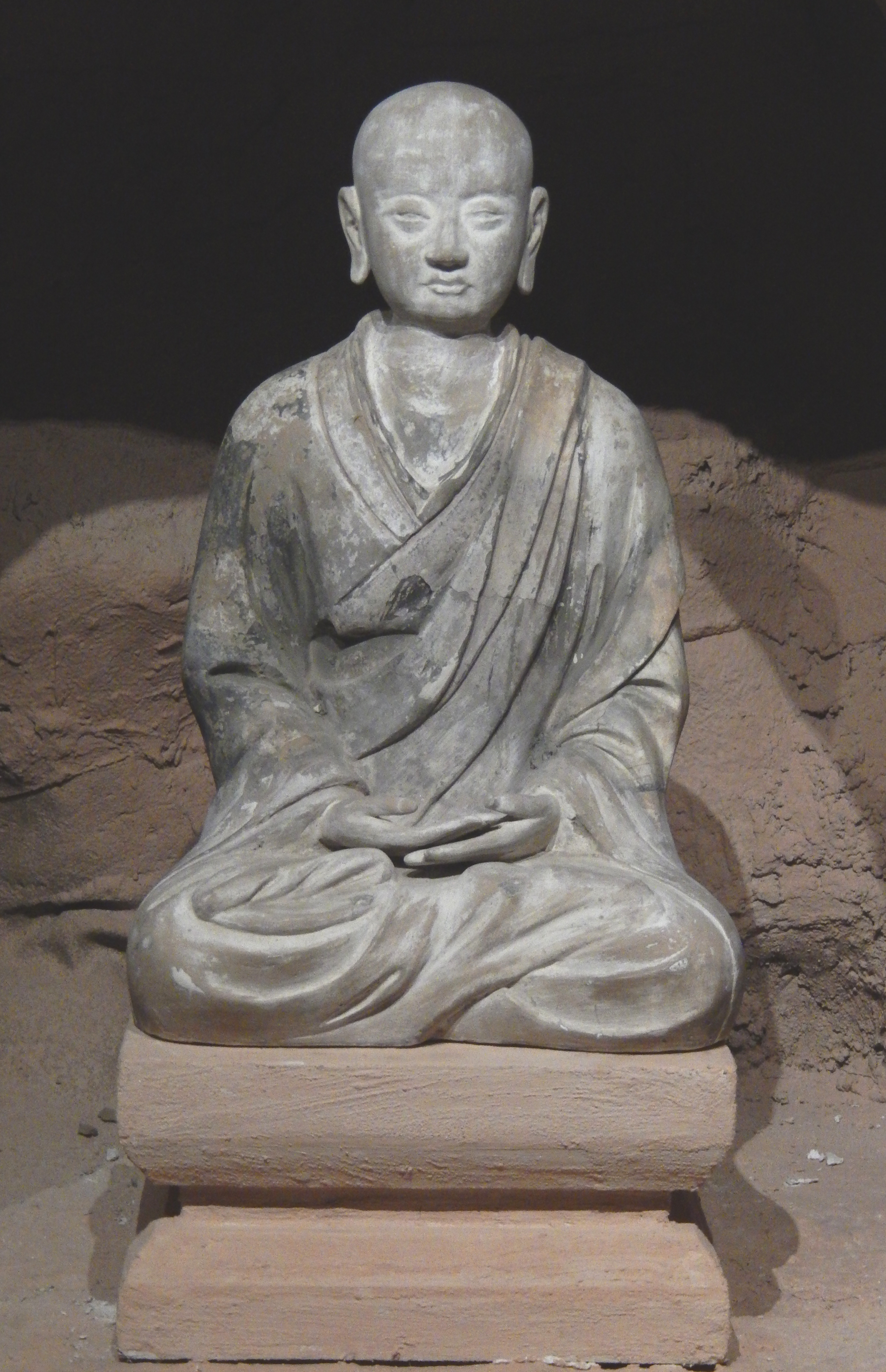
Statue of an arhat

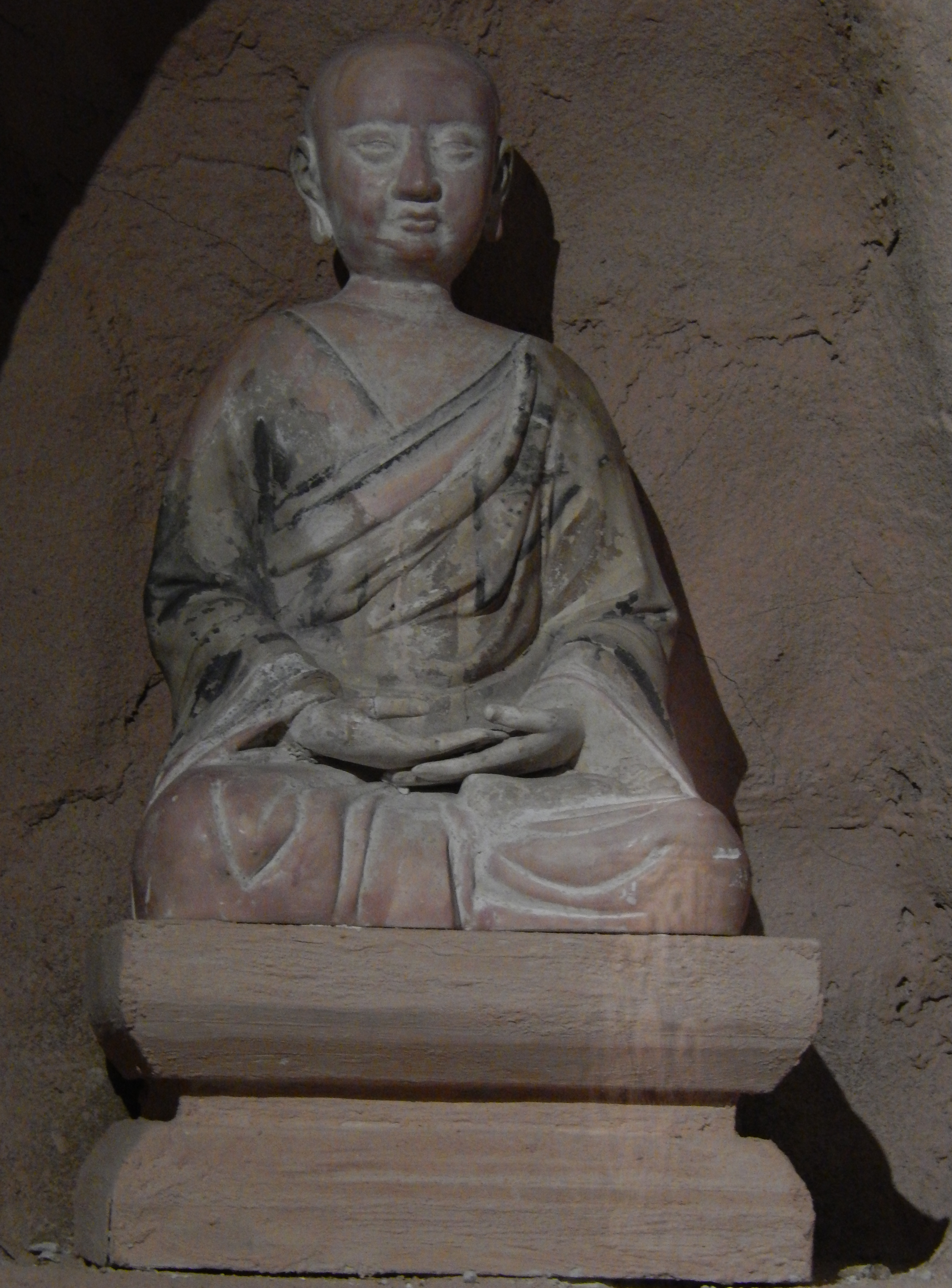
Statue of an arhat

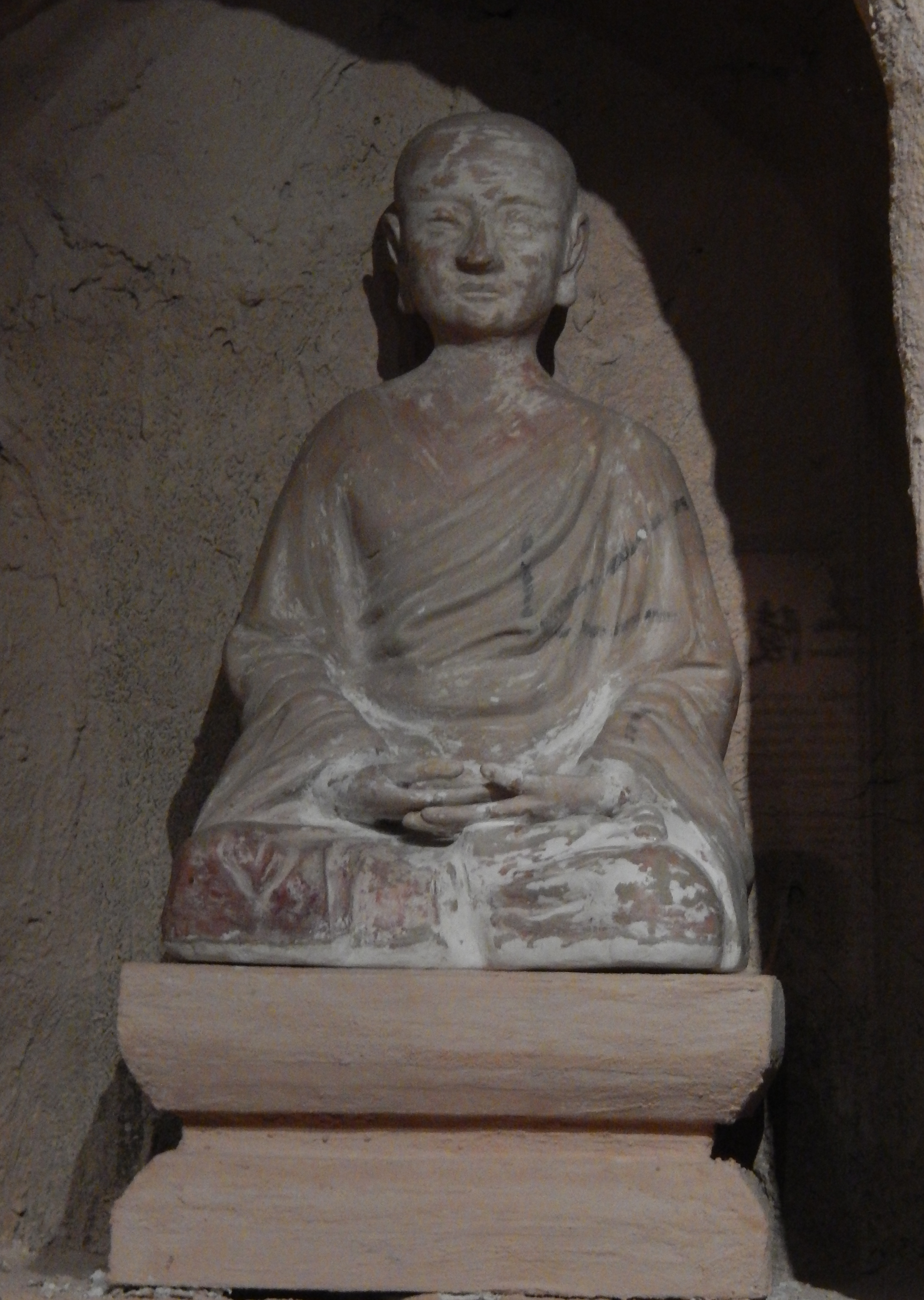
Statue of an arhat

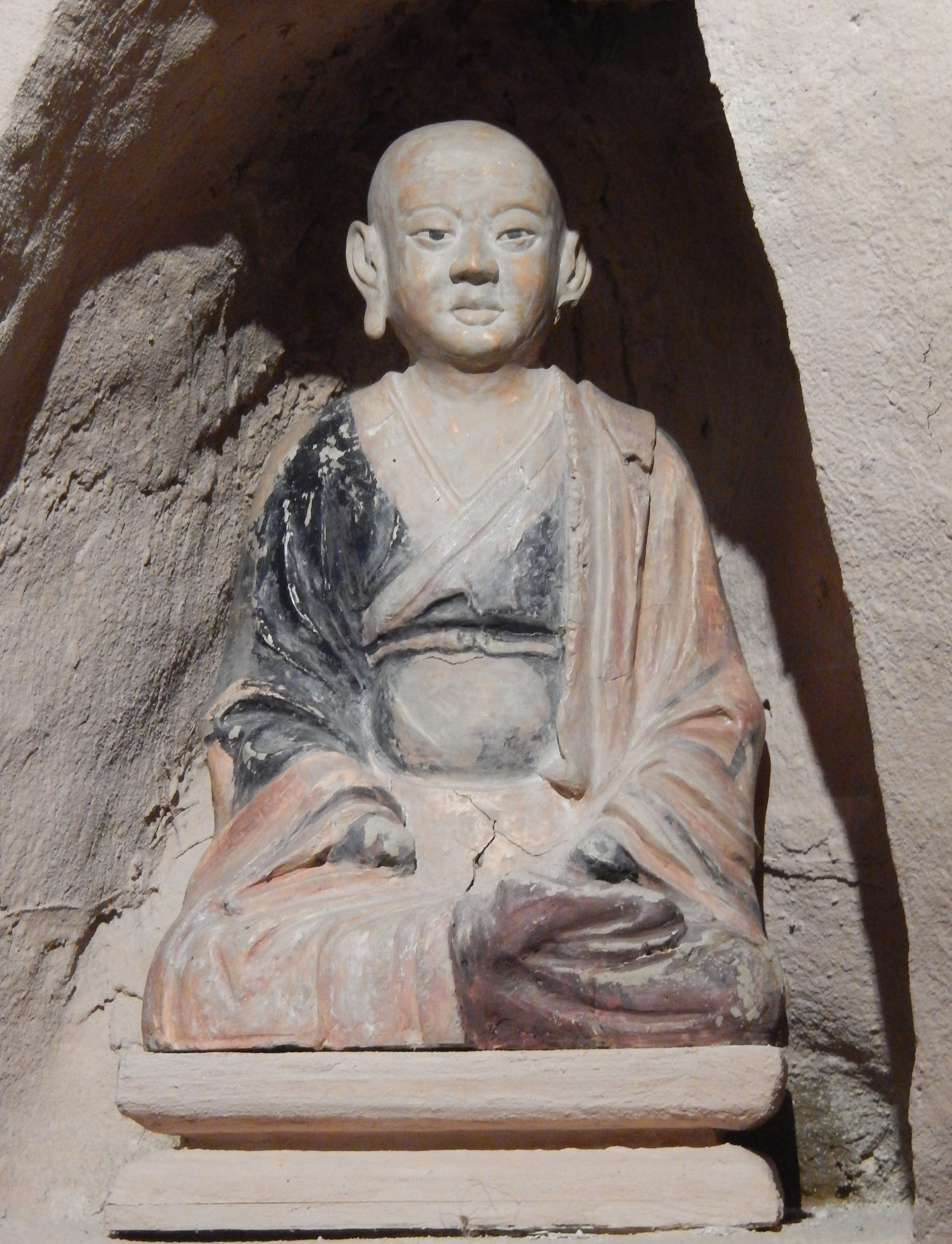
Statue of an arhat

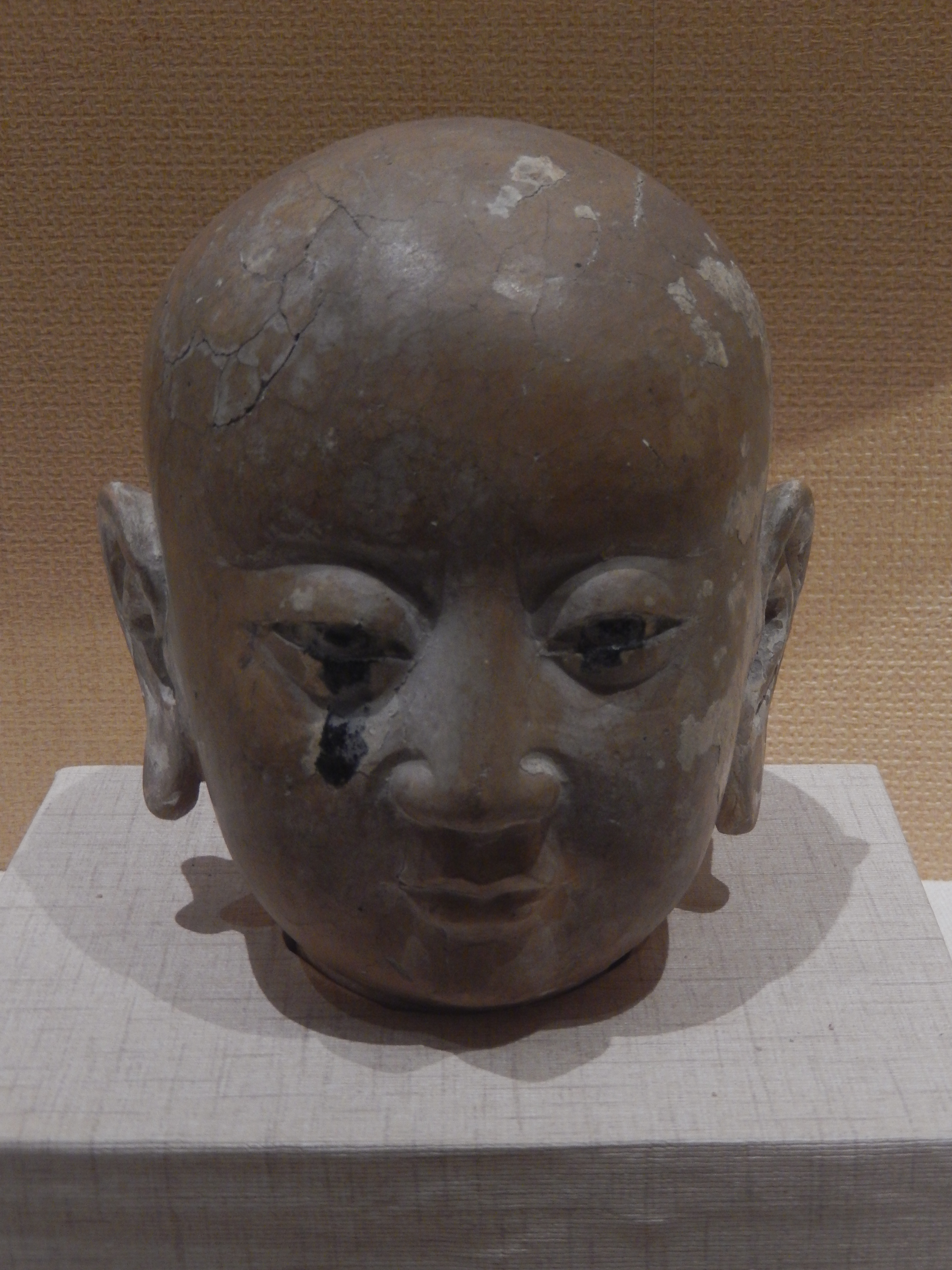
Head of an arhat

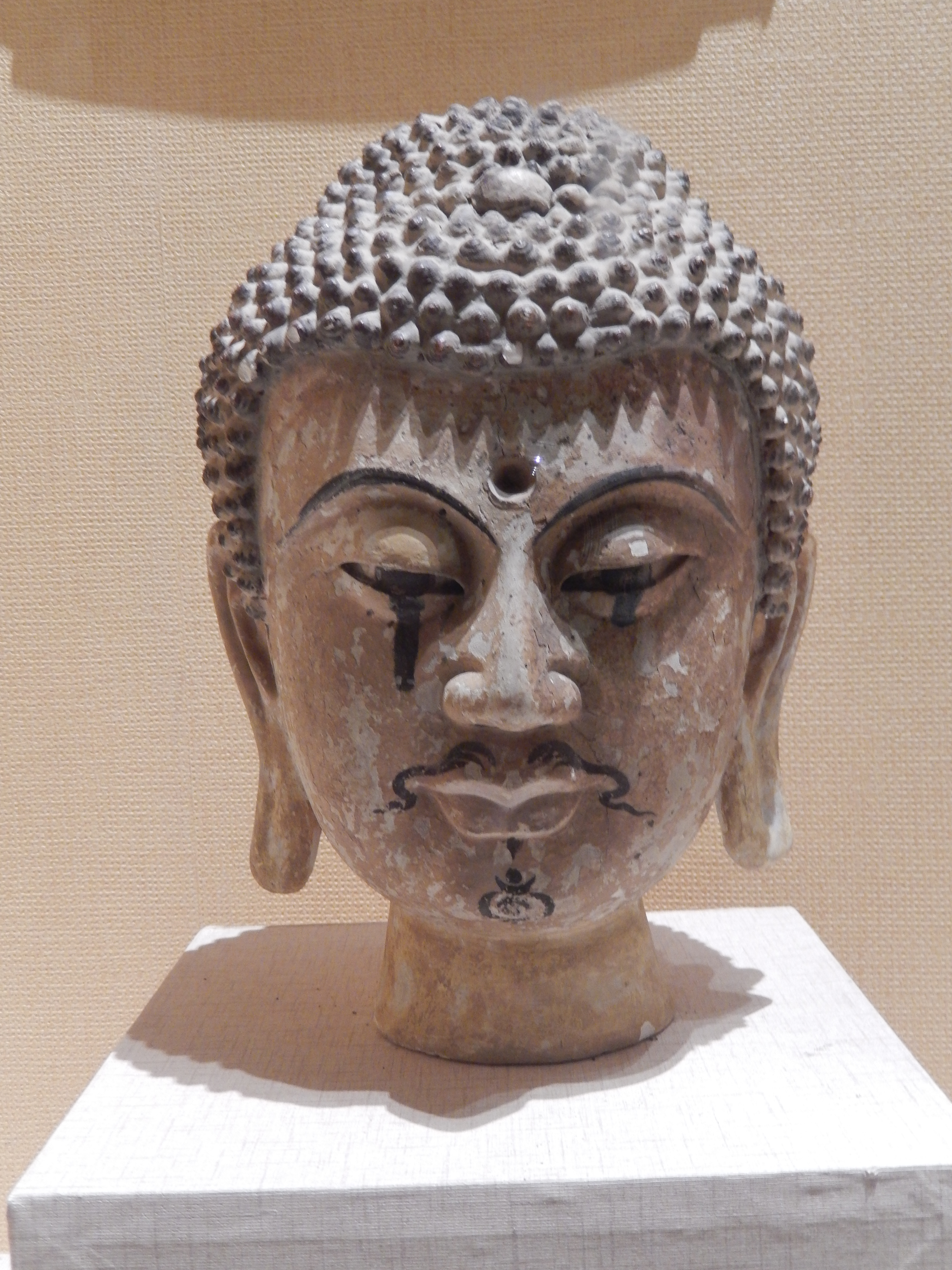
Head of a Buddha

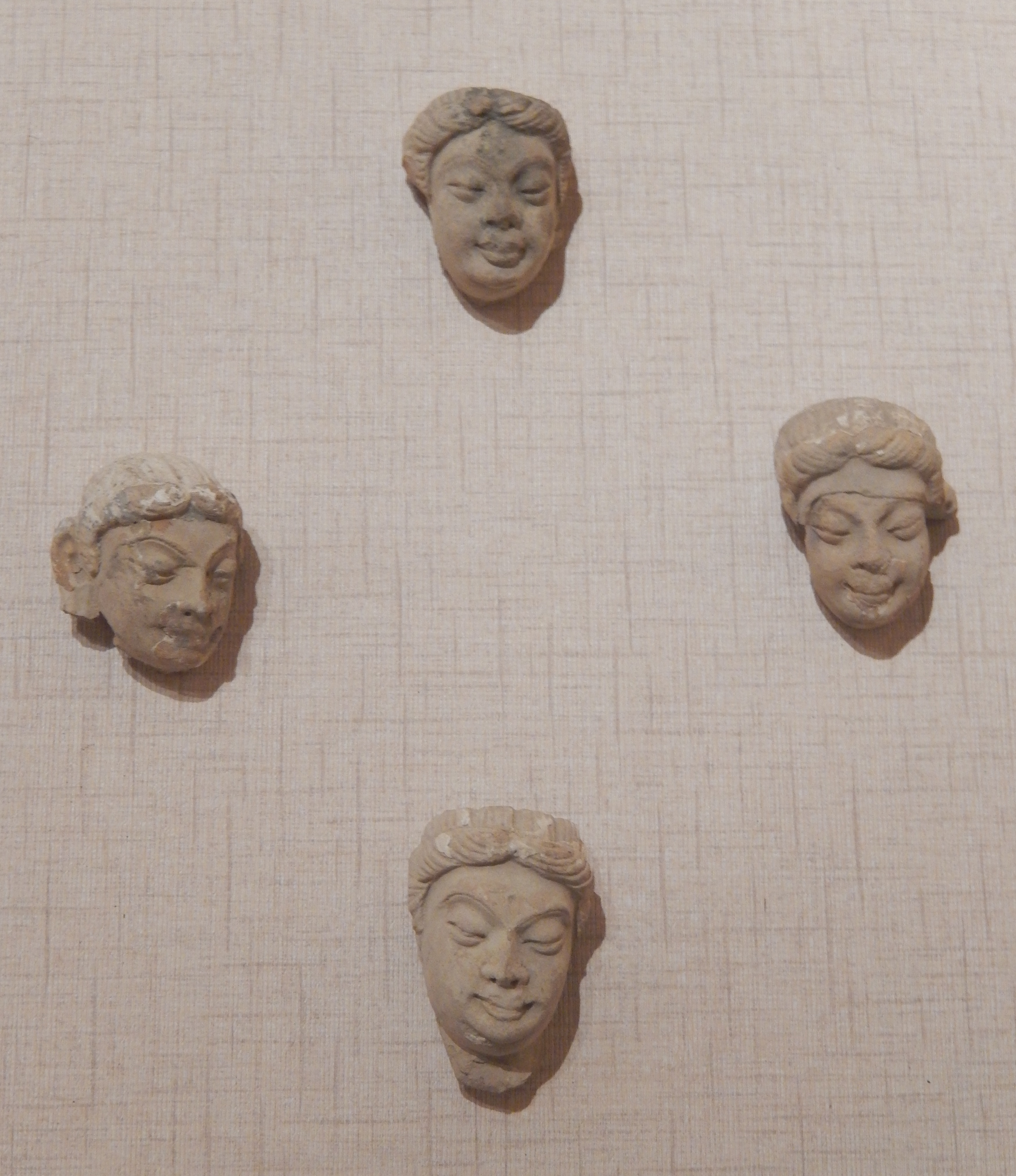
Clay heads of Buddhas

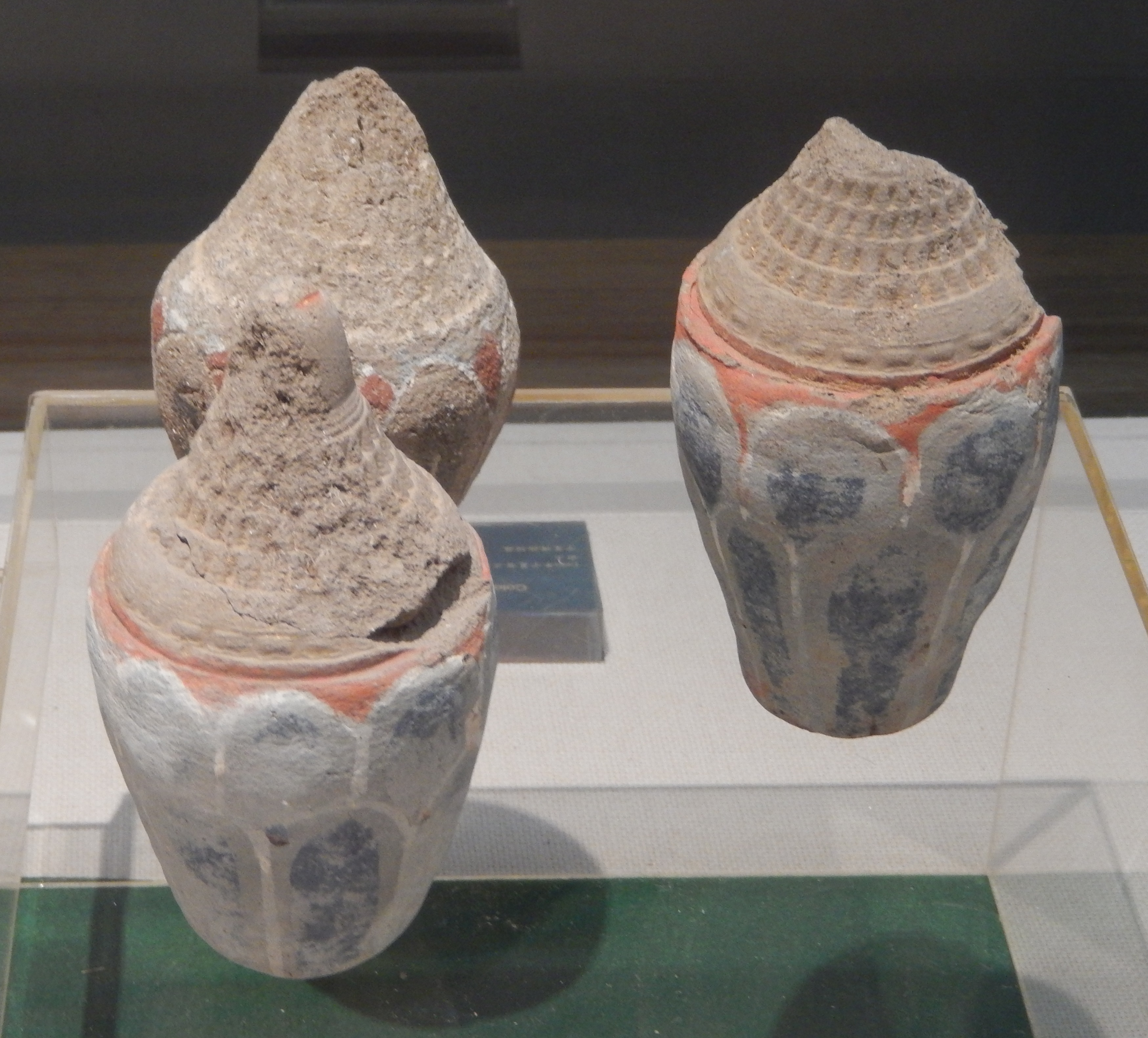
Painted pottery stupa models

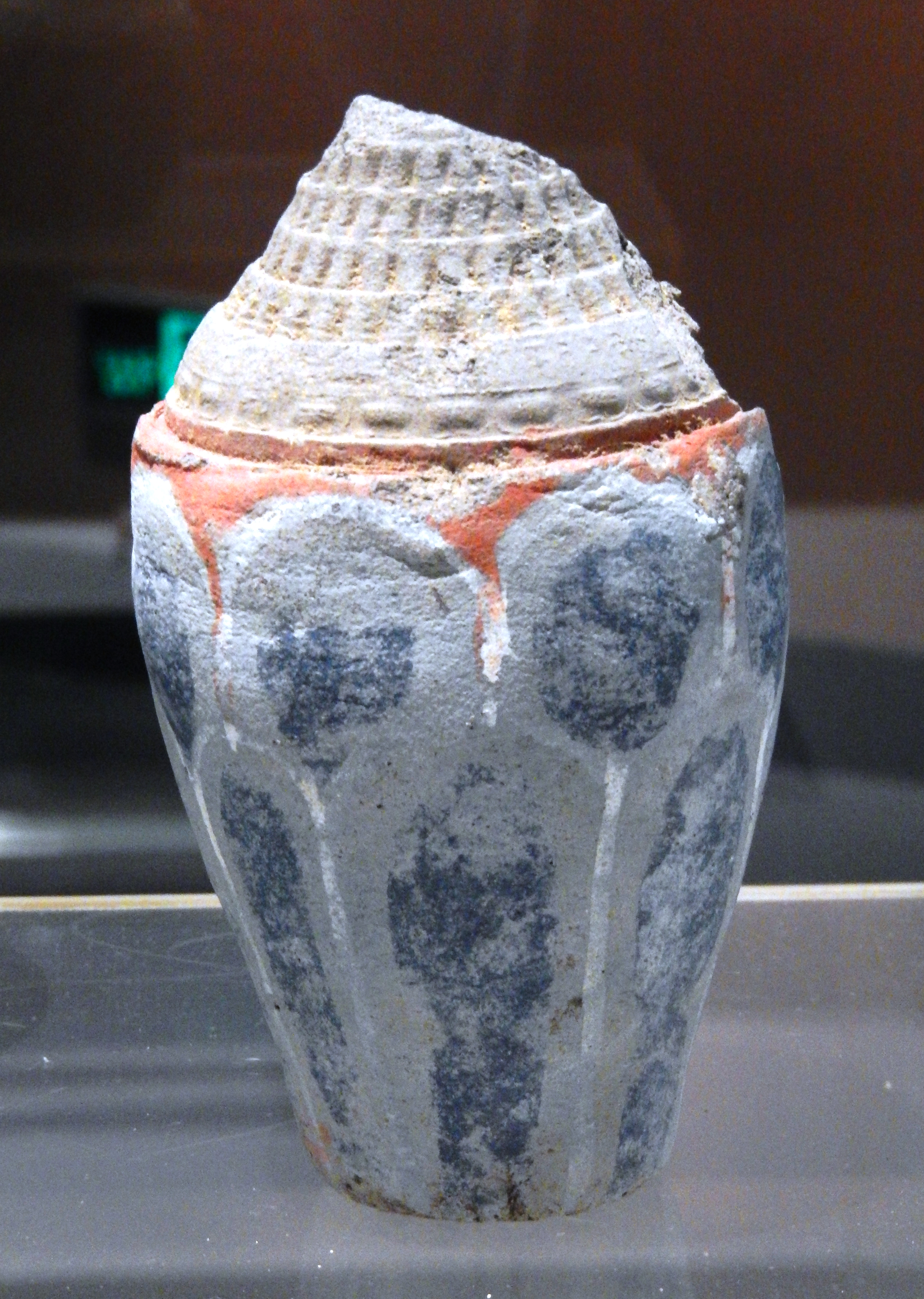
Painted pottery stupa model

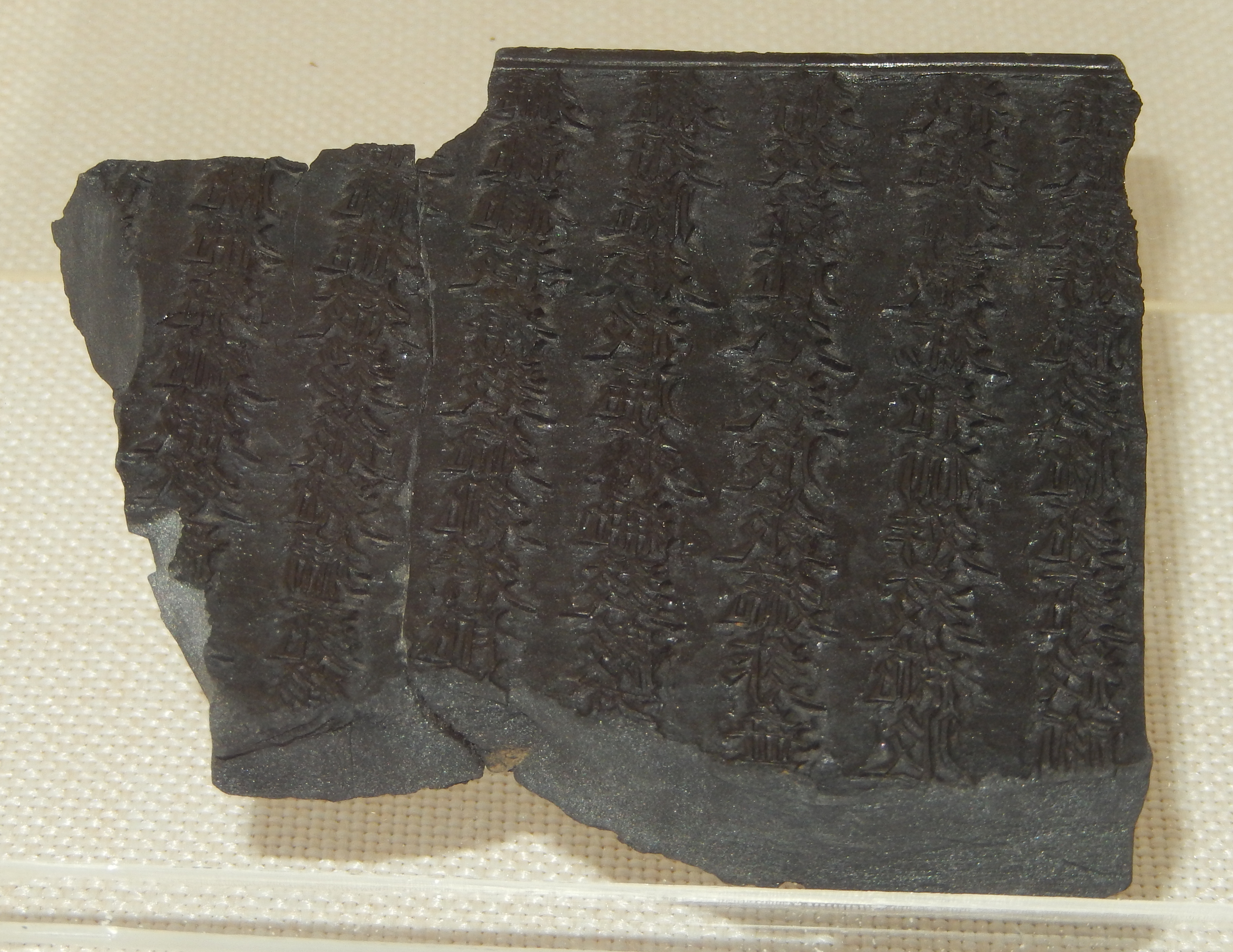
Wooden printing block with Tangut characters

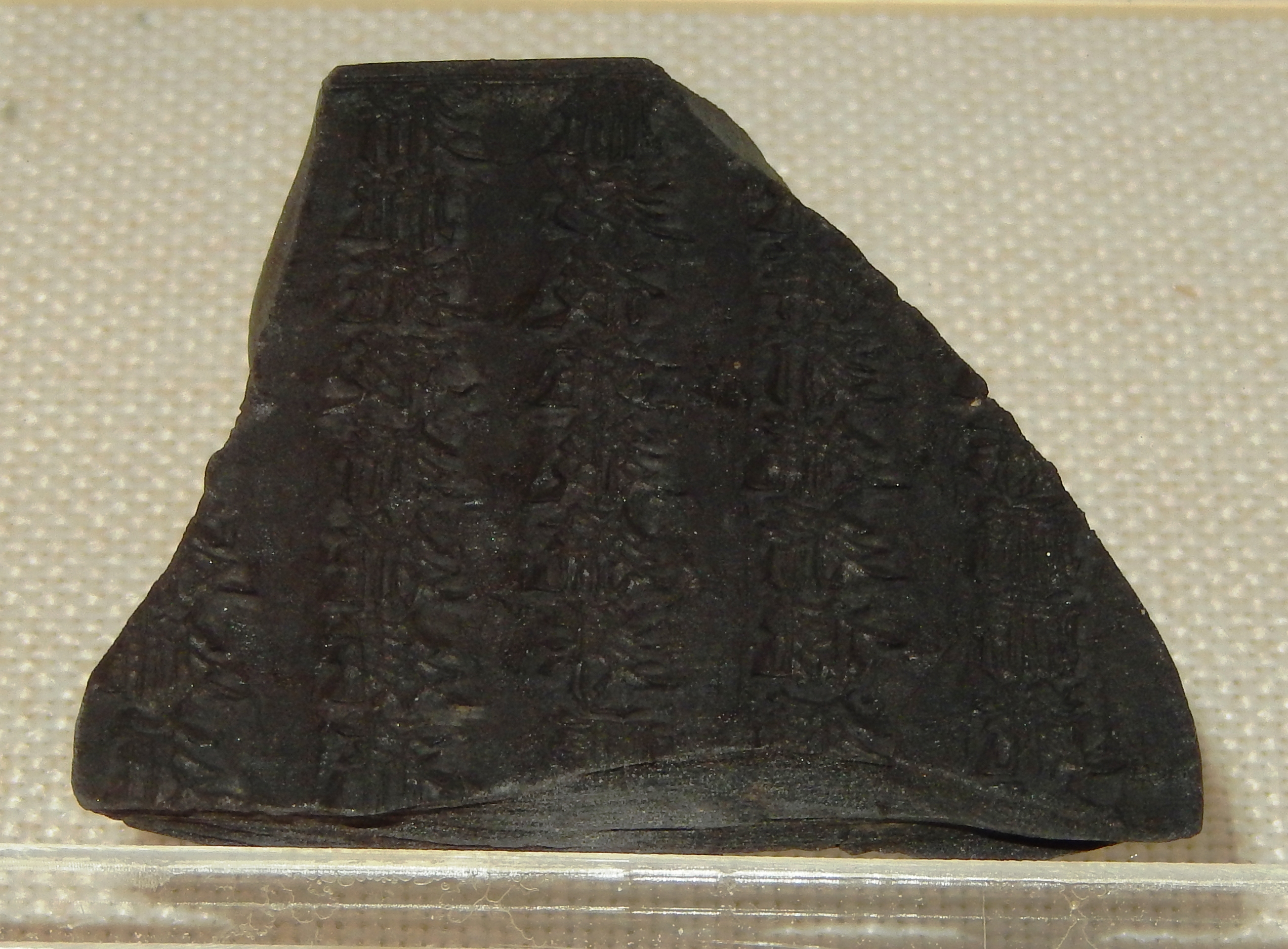
Wooden printing block with Tangut characters

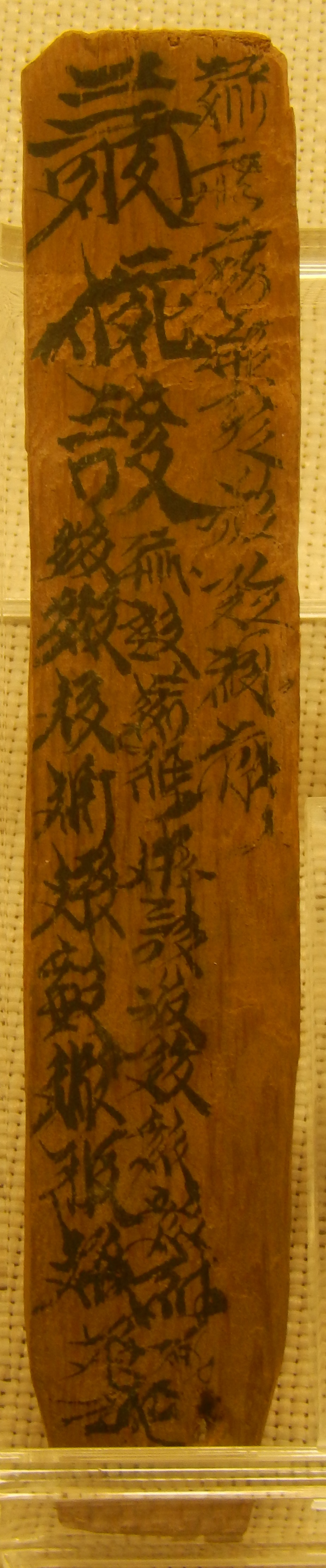
Wooden tablet with Tangut writing

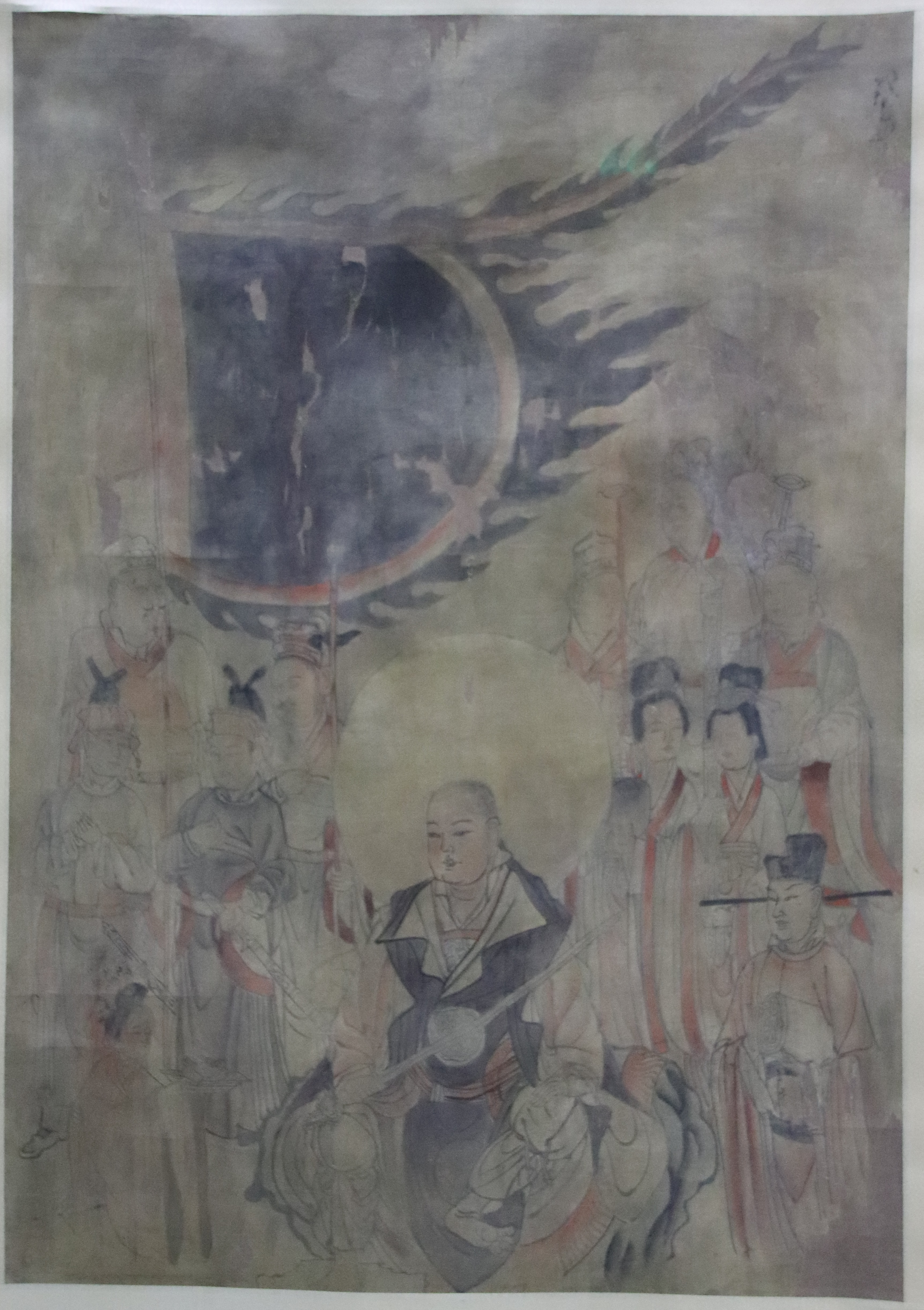
Silk painting depicting the Daoist deity Emperor Xuanwu

== See also ==
- Major national historical and cultural sites in Ningxia
- Chengtian Temple Pagoda
- One Hundred and Eight Stupas
