= Haibao Pagoda Temple =

Buddhist pagoda and temple in Yinchuan, China

- 海宝塔寺
- Haibao Pagoda

- Location within Ningxia Location within China

Religion
- Affiliation: Buddhism
- Sect: Linji school
- Leadership: Guozhen (果真法师)

Location
- Location: Xingqing District, Yinchuan, Ningxia
- Country: China
- Interactive map of Haibao Pagoda Temple
- Coordinates: 38°29′53″N 106°17′14″E

Architecture
- Style: Chinese architecture
- Established: 5th century
- Completed: 18th century (reconstruction)

The Haibao Pagoda Temple (simplified Chinese: 海宝塔寺; traditional Chinese: 海寶塔寺; pinyin: Hǎibǎotǎ Sì) is a Buddhist temple located in Xingqing District of Yinchuan, Ningxia, China. Because of earthquakes, the modern temple was founded in the 18th century in the period of the Qianlong Emperor (1736–1796) during the mid-Qing dynasty (1644–1911). It is the headquarters of the Buddhist Association of Ningxia.

== History ==
The temple was first constructed in the early 5th century, during the Northern and Southern dynasties (420–581). The temple is named after the Haibao Pagoda (海宝塔), also known as "Hebao Pagoda" (赫宝塔) and "Heibao Pagoda" (黑宝塔). According to the local county annals, the pagoda was restored by Helian Bobo (381–425) and the Emperor Wulie of Xia Kingdom (407–431).

The temple had been subjected to two earthquakes in 1712 and 1778, during the mid-Qing dynasty (618–907).

In the early Republic period (1912–1949), it was called "Haibao Chan Temple" (海宝禅院).

In March 1961, it was listed among the "Major National Historical and Cultural Sites in Ningxia" by the State Council of China.

In October 1963, the then Vice-President Dong Biwu visited the temple. In the 1960s, Deng Xiaoping visited the temple.

In 1983, the temple was categorized as a National Key Buddhist Temple in Han Chinese Area by the State Council of China.

== Architecture ==
The entire complex faces the west and has an exquisite layout in the order of the Hall of Shanmen, Hall of Four Heavenly Kings, Mahavira Hall, Hall of Skanda, and Hall of Jade Buddha.

=== Hall of Shanmen ===
The Hall of Shanmen is a gable and hip roof building. Under the eaves is a plaque with the Chinese characters "海寶塔寺" written by Zhao Puchu, the then president of the Buddhist Association of China.

=== Mahavira Hall ===
The Mahavira Hall in the main hall in the temple which houses the statues of the Three-Life Buddha. The statues of Eighteen Arhats are enshrined on the left and right side of the hall.

=== Hall of Jade Buddha ===
The Hall of Jade Buddha is the hall where the statue of Shakyamuni is enshrined. The statue was carved in the Burmese style. The 1.5-metre (4 ft 11 in) statue is made of jade.

=== Haibao Pagoda ===
The eleven story, 53.9-metre (177 ft) tall, dodecagon-based, Haibao Pagoda (海宝塔) is made of brick and stone, also known as the Northern Pagoda (北塔). It is built on a square brick base, each side measuring 19.7 metres (65 ft) long and 5.7 metres (19 ft) high. It is composed of a pagoda base, a dense-eave body, and a thatsa.
