= Pagoda of Chengtian Temple =

Pagoda in Yinchuan, China

Coordinates: 38°27′47″N 106°15′55″E

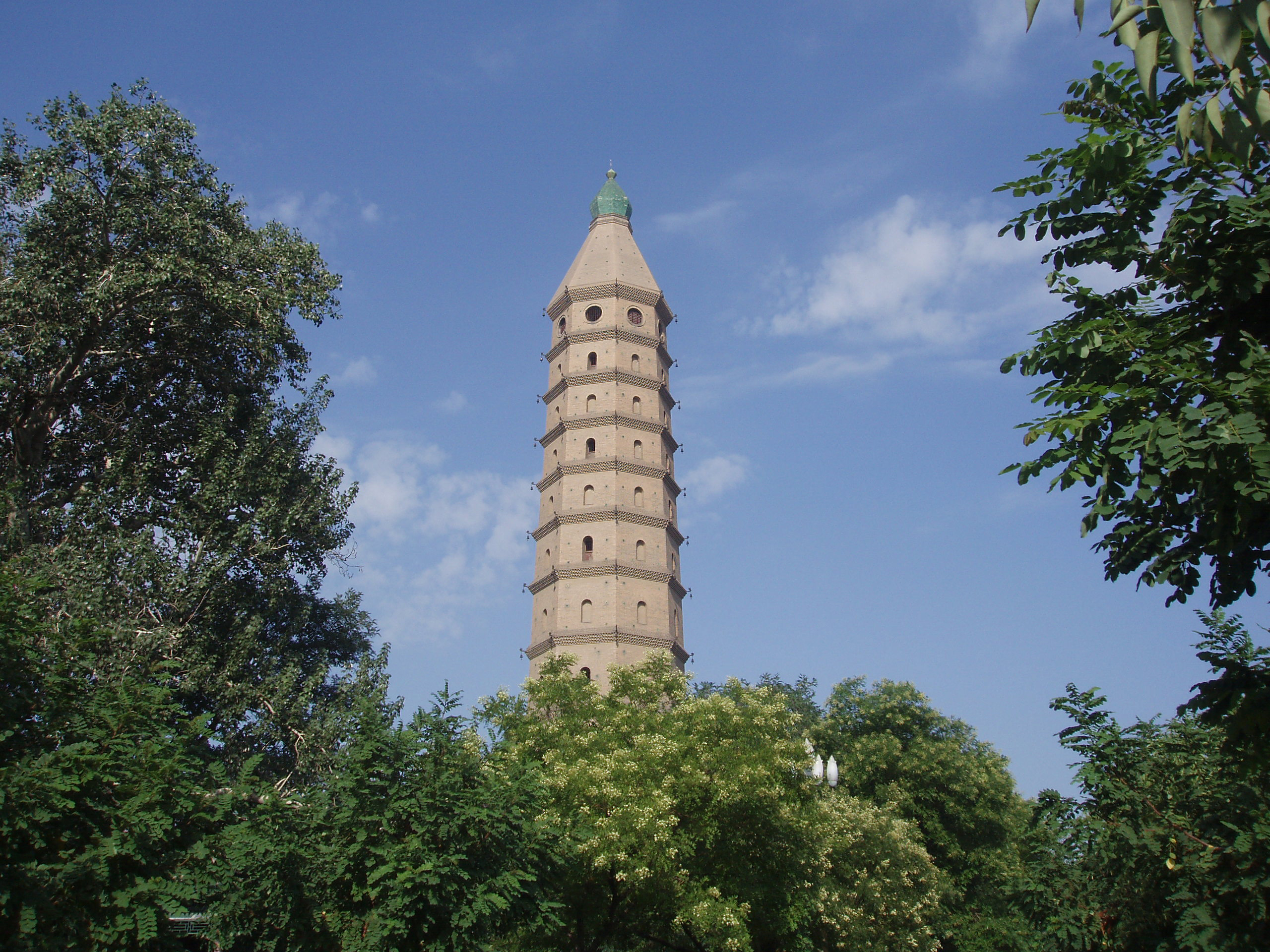
Chengtian Temple Pagoda in Yinchuan

The Pagoda of Chengtian Temple (Chinese: 承天寺塔; pinyin: Chéngtiānsì Tǎ), meaning 'Bearing Heaven Pagoda', is an eleven-storeyed brick pagoda located on the site of a previous Buddhist temple in Yinchuan city, Ningxia, China. The pagoda was originally built during the Western Xia, but the current structure dates to the Qing dynasty. At 64.5 metres (212 ft) in height it is the tallest pagoda in Ningxia. In contrast to the Haibao Pagoda in Yinchuan, which is known as the Northern Pagoda, Chengtian Temple Pagoda is also informally referred to as the Western Pagoda (Chinese: 西塔; pinyin: Xī Tǎ).

== History ==
The first pagoda was built during the infancy of Emperor Yizong of Western Xia (r. 1048–1068). The text of a commemorative stele marking its construction has been preserved, from which it is known that the Empress Dowager ordered the construction of a pagoda to protect the reign of her infant son, and as a reliquary for housing pieces of head bone of the Buddha. The construction of the pagoda was completed in 1050, on the 25th day of the 3rd month of 1st year of the Tianyou Chuisheng era. In 1055 a set of the Tripiṭaka given by Emperor Renzong of Song was deposited at the Chengtian Temple.

By the beginning of the Ming dynasty the temple was in ruins, and only the pagoda remained standing. A poem entitled "Sound of a Bell at the Tall Pagoda" (長塔鐘聲) by the early Ming poet Wang Xun 王遜 describes the desolation of the temple:

鳴鐘長塔寺，不見昔年僧。
聲寂三千界，音銷十二層。
廢基妻冢在，陳跡牧兒登。
有待莊嚴日，無常驗智興。

The bell rings at the temple of the tall pagoda, but I do not see the monks of yore.
Sound is extinguished throughout the three thousand realms, noise vanishes up to the twelve levels [of heaven].
The grave of someone's wife lies in the abandoned ruins, boys tending sheep clamber among the scattered remains.
Awaiting the day it will return to splendour, in this transient world a [Duan] Zhixing will appear.

Duan Zhixing was a 12th-century king of the Dali Kingdom who was renowned for repairing Buddhist temples, and Wang Xun uses him to refer to his patron, Zhu Zhan 朱栴 (1378–1438; Prince Jing of Qing, the 16th son of the Hongwu Emperor), who was subsequently responsible for renovating Chengtian Temple. The renovation of the temple was completed by Zhu Zhan's grandson, Zhu Suikan 朱邃坎, in 1469.

On 3 January 1739, Yinchuan was hit by a large earthquake, and the pagoda was destroyed. In 1820 the present pagoda was built on the site of the original pagoda.

== Description ==
The present pagoda is an eleven-storeyed, octagonal pagoda constructed of bricks, standing on a square platform 26 metres (85 ft) across and 2.6 metres (8.5 ft) high. The pagoda itself is approximately 64.5 metres (212 ft) in height, and each side of the bottom storey is 5 metres (16 ft) in width. The pagoda is hollow, with an entrance in the east wall, and wooden stairs lead up to the top storey, where there are windows facing in four directions.

No depictions of the original Western Xia pagoda survive, but it is thought that the current pagoda copies the shape and style of the original Western Xia pagoda. A Ming dynasty source states the pagoda at that time had thirteen storeys, but that may be counting the roof and the finial.

In 2006 the pagoda was listed as a Major Historical and Cultural Site Protected at the National Level.

== See also ==
- Major national historical and cultural sites in Ningxia
- Hongfo Pagoda
