= Yanchi County =

Yanchi 盐池县 يًاچِ ثِيًا Yenchih
- County
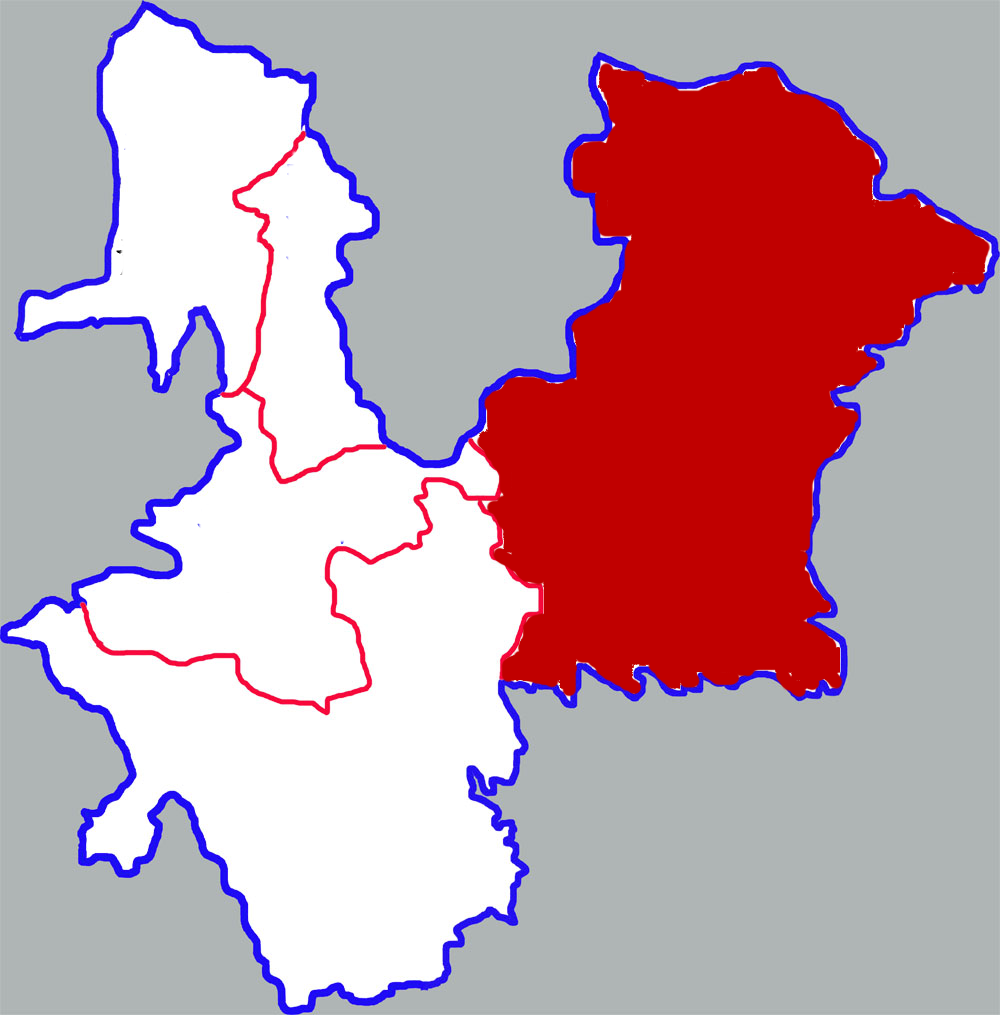
- Yanchi in Wuzhong

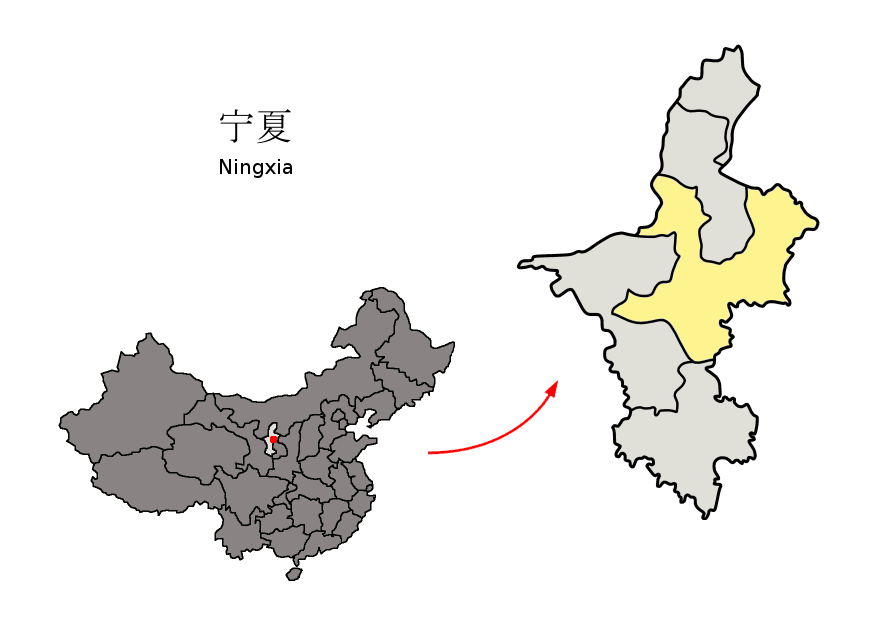
- Wuzhong in Ningxia
- Coordinates: 37°47′00″N 107°24′26″E
- Country: China
- Autonomous region: Ningxia
- Prefecture-level city: Wuzhong
- County seat: Huamachi

Area
  - Total: 6,553.79 km^{2} (2,530.43 sq mi)

Population
  - Total: 146,560
  - Density: 22.363/km^{2} (57.919/sq mi)
- Time zone: UTC+8 (China Standard)

Yanchi County (simplified Chinese: 盐池县; traditional Chinese: 鹽池縣; pinyin: Yánchí Xiàn; Wade–Giles: Yan^{2}-ch'ih^{2} Hsien^{4}, Xiao'erjing: يًاچِ ثِيًا) is a county under the administration of Wuzhong city in Ningxia Hui Autonomous Region of China, bordering the provinces of Shaanxi to the east and Gansu to the south, as well as Inner Mongolia to the north. Covering a total area of 6,787 km^{2} (2,620 sq mi), it has a population of about 150,000 people.

== Characteristics ==
Yanchi County is one of China's most impoverished counties. Economic development has been slow, because much of the land in the county is wasteland with alkali soil, making farming difficult. Also, to cancel agricultural taxes on these lands, the county government has in recent years developed the cultivation of honey and high-tech herbs. The town of Huamachi serves as the location for the county government offices. The county's postal code is 751500.

== Geography and climate ==
Climate data for Yanchi County, elevation 1,351 m (4,432 ft), (1991–2020 normals, extremes 1954–present)
| Month | Jan | Feb | Mar | Apr | May | Jun | Jul | Aug | Sep | Oct | Nov | Dec | Year |
|---|---|---|---|---|---|---|---|---|---|---|---|---|---|
| Record high °C (°F) | 18.2 (64.8) | 19.6 (67.3) | 27.3 (81.1) | 34.0 (93.2) | 35.6 (96.1) | 38.1 (100.6) | 37.5 (99.5) | 37.4 (99.3) | 35.2 (95.4) | 28.3 (82.9) | 22.9 (73.2) | 16.6 (61.9) | 38.1 (100.6) |
| Mean daily maximum °C (°F) | 0.3 (32.5) | 4.8 (40.6) | 11.5 (52.7) | 18.8 (65.8) | 24.0 (75.2) | 28.3 (82.9) | 29.8 (85.6) | 27.6 (81.7) | 22.5 (72.5) | 16.5 (61.7) | 9.0 (48.2) | 1.9 (35.4) | 16.3 (61.2) |
| Daily mean °C (°F) | −7.7 (18.1) | −3.4 (25.9) | 3.6 (38.5) | 11.1 (52.0) | 16.8 (62.2) | 21.5 (70.7) | 23.3 (73.9) | 21.2 (70.2) | 15.8 (60.4) | 8.8 (47.8) | 1.2 (34.2) | −5.8 (21.6) | 8.9 (48.0) |
| Mean daily minimum °C (°F) | −13.9 (7.0) | −9.9 (14.2) | −3.0 (26.6) | 3.7 (38.7) | 9.4 (48.9) | 14.3 (57.7) | 17.1 (62.8) | 15.5 (59.9) | 10.1 (50.2) | 2.8 (37.0) | −4.5 (23.9) | −11.6 (11.1) | 2.5 (36.5) |
| Record low °C (°F) | −29.4 (−20.9) | −28.7 (−19.7) | −21.9 (−7.4) | −13.0 (8.6) | −3.9 (25.0) | 1.3 (34.3) | 7.3 (45.1) | 3.9 (39.0) | −7.1 (19.2) | −13.6 (7.5) | −22.9 (−9.2) | −29.6 (−21.3) | −29.6 (−21.3) |
| Average precipitation mm (inches) | 2.2 (0.09) | 3.6 (0.14) | 7.3 (0.29) | 14.2 (0.56) | 28.7 (1.13) | 37.8 (1.49) | 65.7 (2.59) | 71.0 (2.80) | 45.5 (1.79) | 19.0 (0.75) | 7.6 (0.30) | 1.5 (0.06) | 304.1 (11.99) |
| Average precipitation days (≥ 0.1 mm) | 2.7 | 2.3 | 3.1 | 4.3 | 5.2 | 7.4 | 8.9 | 10.0 | 8.9 | 5.5 | 2.9 | 1.4 | 62.6 |
| Average snowy days | 4.1 | 3.0 | 2.3 | 0.7 | 0 | 0 | 0 | 0 | 0 | 0.8 | 2.5 | 2.5 | 15.9 |
| Average relative humidity (%) | 51 | 46 | 40 | 37 | 40 | 46 | 56 | 63 | 64 | 58 | 53 | 50 | 50 |
| Mean monthly sunshine hours | 203.5 | 201.1 | 234.2 | 253.2 | 278.1 | 275.7 | 272.3 | 251.3 | 217.0 | 230.2 | 209.7 | 207.1 | 2,833.4 |
| Percentage possible sunshine | 66 | 65 | 63 | 64 | 63 | 62 | 61 | 60 | 59 | 67 | 70 | 70 | 64 |
Source: China Meteorological Administrationextremes

== Administrative divisions ==
Yanchi County has 1 subdistrict, 4 towns and 4 townships.

1 subdistrict

- Yanzhoulu (盐州路街道)

4 towns

- Huamachi (花马池镇, خُوَامَاچِ چٍ)
- Gaoshawo (高沙窝镇, قَوْشَاوَ جٍ)
- Hui'anbao (惠安堡镇, خُوِاًبَوْ جٍ)
- Dashuikeng (大水坑镇, دَاشُوِکٍْ جٍ)

4 townships

- Mahuangshan (麻黄山乡, مَاخُوَانْ‌شًا ثِيَانْ)
- Qingshan (青山乡, ٿٍْ‌شًا ثِيَانْ)
- Fengjigou (冯记沟乡, فٍْ‌ڭِ‌قِوْ ثِيَانْ)
- Wanglejing (王乐井乡, وَانْ‌لَ‌ڭٍْ ثِيَانْ)
