= 2008 Sichuan earthquake =

Magnitude 8.0 earthquake in China

2008 Sichuan earthquake 汶川大地震
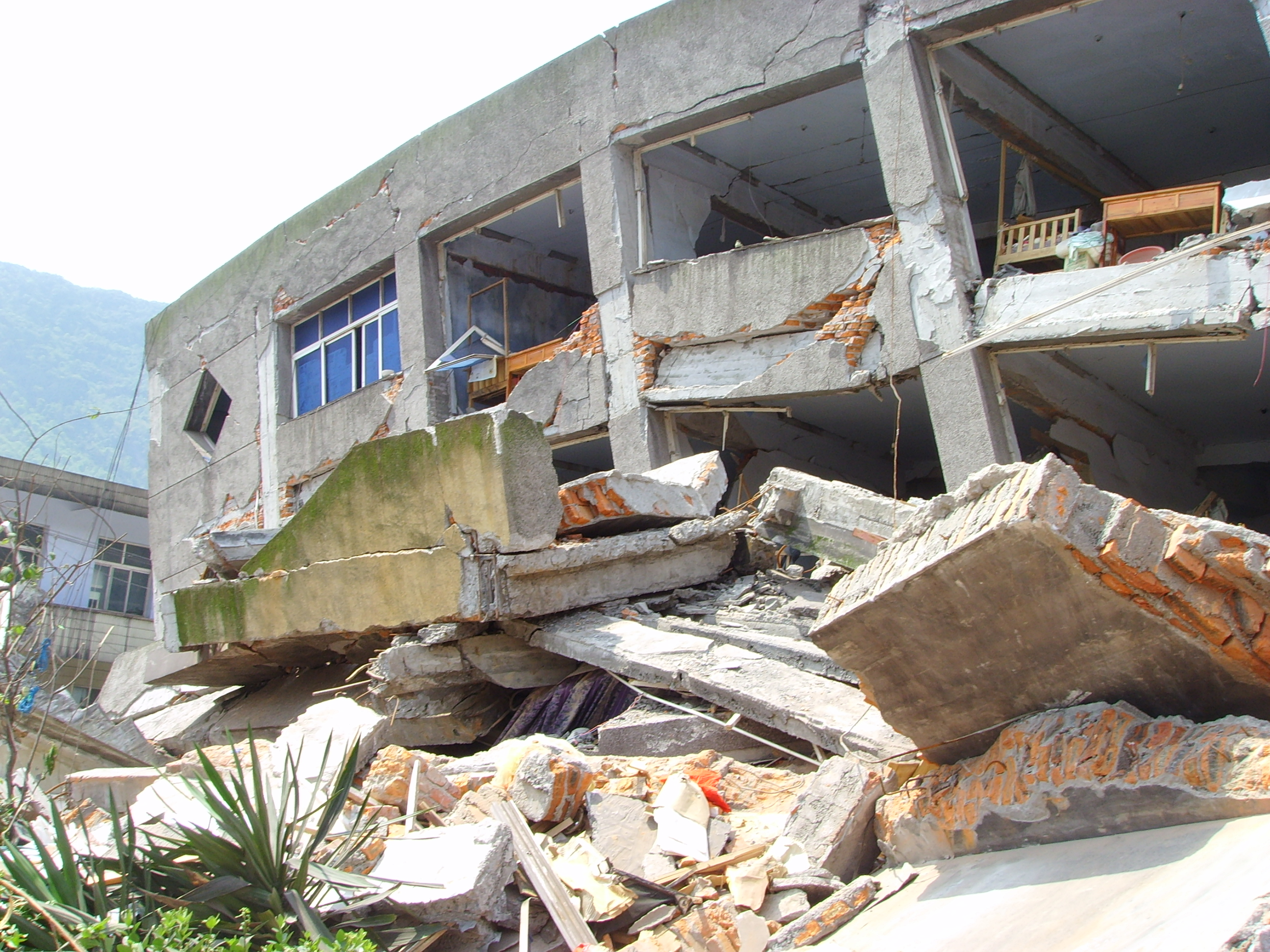
- A collapsed building in Wenchuan County

- Location within Sichuan Location within China
- UTC time: 2008-05-12 06:28:01
- ISC event: 13228121
- USGS-ANSS: ComCat
- Local date: May 12, 2008
- Local time: 14:28:01 CST
- Duration: >2 minutes
- Magnitude: 7.9–8.3 M_{w} 8.0 M_{s}
- Depth: 19 km (12 mi)
- Epicenter: 31.021°N 103.367°E
- Fault: Yingxiu-Beichuan fault
- Type: Thrust fault
- Areas affected: Sichuan
- Total damage: US$130 billion (equivalent to $194.4 billion in 2025)
- Max. intensity: CSIS XI MMI XI (Extreme)
- Aftershocks: 149 to 284 major, over 42,719 total
- Casualties: 69,196 dead, 374,643 injured, and 18,379 missing and presumed dead

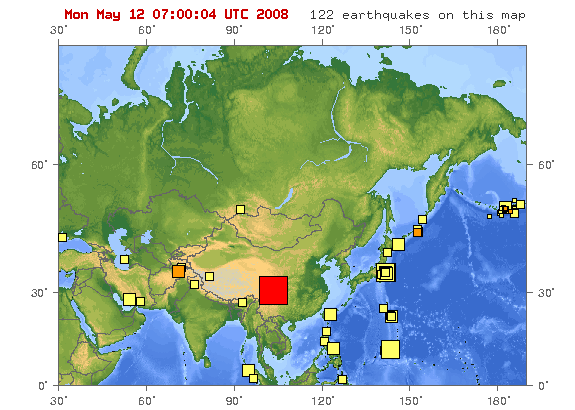
The USGS provided a map of Asia in May 2008, which showed a total of 122 earthquakes occurring on the continent. The large red square near the center of the map depicts the 7.9 magnitude Chengdu quake in the Sichuan province.

Map showing the location of the 2008 Sichuan earthquake and all the aftershocks following it through May 28, 2008

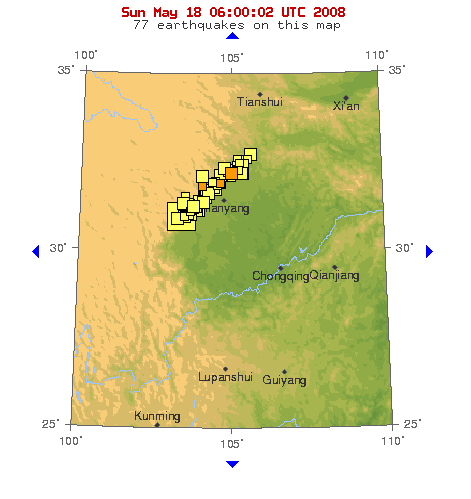
A USGS map shows that dozens of aftershocks occurred in a small region following the quake.

An earthquake occurred in the province of Sichuan, China at 14:28:01 China Standard Time on May 12, 2008. Measuring at 8.0 M_{s} (7.9–8.3 M_{w}), the earthquake's epicenter was located 80 kilometres (50 mi) west-northwest of Chengdu, the provincial capital, with a focal depth of 19 km (12 mi). The earthquake ruptured the fault for over 240 km (150 mi), with surface displacements of several meters. The earthquake was also felt as far away as Beijing and Shanghai—1,500 and 1,700 km (930 and 1,060 mi) away, respectively—where office buildings swayed with the tremor, as well as Bangkok and Hanoi. Strong aftershocks, some exceeding 6 M_{s}, continued to hit the area up to several months after the main shock, causing further casualties and damage. The earthquake also caused the largest number of geohazards ever recorded, including about 200,000 landslides and more than 800 quake lakes distributed over an area of 110,000 km^{2} (42,000 sq mi).

Over 69,000 people lost their lives in the quake, including 68,636 in Sichuan province. More than 374,000 were reported injured, with 18,000 listed as missing as of July 2008. The geohazards triggered by the earthquake are thought to be responsible for at least one third of the death toll. The earthquake left at least 4.8 million people homeless, though the number could be as high as 11 million. Approximately 15 million people lived in the affected area. It was the deadliest earthquake to hit China since the 1976 Tangshan earthquake, which killed at least 242,000 people, and the strongest in the country since the 1950 Assam–Tibet earthquake, which registered at 8.6 M_{w}. It was the 4th deadliest natural disaster of the decade. It is the 18th deadliest earthquake of all time. The economic loss of the earthquake was 845.1 billion yuan (US$130 billion). On November 6, 2008, the central government announced that it would spend 1 trillion yuan (about US$146.5 billion) over the next three years to rebuild areas ravaged by the earthquake, as part of the Chinese economic stimulus program.

== Geology ==
According to a study by the China Earthquake Administration (CEA), the earthquake occurred along the Longmenshan Fault, a thrust structure along the border of the Indo-Australian plate and Eurasian plate. Seismic activities concentrated on its mid-fracture (known as Yingxiu-Beichuan fracture). The rupture lasted close to 120 seconds, with the majority of energy released in the first 80 seconds. Starting from Wenchuan, the rupture propagated at an average speed of 3.1 km/s (6,900 mph), 49° toward north east, rupturing a total of about 300 km (190 mi). Maximum displacement amounted to nine metres (30 ft). The focus was deeper than 10 km (6.2 mi).

In a United States Geological Survey (USGS) study, preliminary rupture models of the earthquake indicated displacement of up to nine metres (30 ft) along a fault approximately 240 km (150 mi) long by 20 km (12 mi) deep. The earthquake generated deformations of the surface greater than three metres (9.8 ft) and increased the stress (and probability of occurrence of future events) at the northeastern and southwestern ends of the fault. On May 20, USGS seismologist Tom Parsons warned that there is "high risk" of a major M>7 aftershock over the next couple weeks or months.

Japanese seismologist Yuji Yagi at the University of Tsukuba said that the earthquake occurred in more than 1 stage: "The 250-kilometre (155 mi) Longmenshan Fault tore in two sections, the first one ripping about 6.5 metres (7 yd) followed by a second one that sheared 3.5 metres (4 yd)." His data also showed that the earthquake lasted about two minutes and released 30 times the energy of the Great Hanshin earthquake of 1995 in Japan, which killed over 6,000 people. He pointed out that the shallowness of the hypocenter and the density of population greatly increased the severity of the earthquake. Teruyuki Kato, a seismologist at the University of Tokyo, said that the seismic waves of the quake traveled a long distance without losing their power because of the firmness of the terrain in central China. According to reports from Chengdu, the capital of Sichuan province, the earthquake tremors lasted for "about two or three minutes".

=== Tectonics ===
The extent of the earthquake and after shock-affected areas lying north-east, along the Longmen Shan fault.

The Longmen Shan Fault System is situated in the eastern border of the Tibetan Plateau and contains several faults. This earthquake ruptured at least two imbricate structures in Longmen Shan Fault System, i.e. the Beichuan Fault and the Guanxian–Anxian Fault. In the epicentral area, the average slip in Beichuan Fault was about 3.5 metres (11 ft) vertical, 3.5 metres (11 ft) horizontal-parallel to the fault, and 4.8 metres (16 ft) horizontal-perpendicular to the fault. In the area about 30 kilometres (19 mi) northeast of the epicenter, the surface slip on Beichuan Fault was almost purely dextral strike-slip up to about three metres (9.8 ft), while the average slip in Guanxian–Anxian Fault was about two metres (6.6 ft) vertical and 2.3 metres (7.5 ft) horizontal.

According to CEA:

"The energy source of the Wenchuan earthquake and Longmenshan's southeast push came from the strike of the Indian plate onto the Eurasian plate and its northward push. The inter-plate relative motion caused large scale structural deformation inside the Asian continent, resulting in a thinning crust of the Qinghai-Tibet Plateau, the uplift of its landscape and an eastward extrude. Near the Sichuan Basin, Qinghai-Tibet Plateau's east-northward movement meets with strong resistance from the South China Block, causing a high degree of stress accumulation in the Longmenshan thrust formation. This finally caused a sudden dislocation in the Yingxiu-Beichuan fracture, leading to the violent earthquake of M_{s} 8.0."

Dr. Harley Benz, US Geological Survey

According to the United States Geological Survey:

The earthquake occurred as the result of motion on a northeast striking reverse fault or thrust fault on the northwestern margin of the Sichuan Basin. The earthquake's epicenter and focal-mechanism are consistent with it having occurred as the result of movement on the Longmenshan Fault or a tectonically related fault. The earthquake reflects tectonic stresses resulting from the convergence of crustal material slowly moving from the high Tibetan Plateau, to the west, against strong crust underlying the Sichuan Basin and southeastern China.

On a continental scale, the seismicity of central and eastern Asia is a result of northward convergence of the Indian plate against the Eurasian plate with a velocity of about 50 mm/a [2.0 in/year]. The convergence of the two plates is broadly accommodated by the uplift of the Asian highlands and by the motion of crustal material to the east away from the uplifted Tibetan Plateau. The northwestern margin of the Sichuan Basin has previously experienced destructive earthquakes. The magnitude 7.5 earthquake of August 25, 1933, killed more than 9,300 people.

According to the British Geological Survey:

The earthquake occurred 92 km [57 mi] northwest of the city of Chengdu in eastern Sichuan province and over 1,500 km [930 mi] from Beijing, where it was also strongly felt. Earthquakes of this size have the potential to cause extensive damage and loss of life.

The epicenter was in the mountains of the Eastern Margin of Qing-Tibet Plateau at the northwest margin of the Sichuan Basin. The earthquake occurred as a result of motion on a northeast striking thrust fault that runs along the margin of the basin.

The seismicity of central and eastern Asia is caused by the northward movement of the India plate at a rate of 5 cm/year [2.0 in/year] and its collision with Eurasia, resulting in the uplift of the Himalaya and Tibetan plateaux and associated earthquake activity. This deformation also results in the extrusion of crustal material from the high Tibetan Plateaux in the west towards the Sichuan Basin and southeastern China. China frequently suffers large and deadly earthquakes. In August 1933, the magnitude 7.5 Diexi earthquake, about 90 km [56 mi] northeast of today's earthquake, destroyed the town of Diexi and surrounding villages, and caused many landslides, some of which dammed the rivers.

=== Intensities and damage area ===
The map of earthquake intensity published by CEA after surveying 500,000 km^{2} (190,000 sq mi) of the affected area shows a maximum liedu of XI on the China seismic intensity scale (CSIS), described as "very destructive" on the European Macroseismic Scale (EMS) from which CSIS drew reference. (USGS, using the Modified Mercalli intensity scale (CC), also placed maximum intensity at XI, "extreme".) Two south-west-north-east stripes of liedu XI are centered around Yingxiu, Wenchuan (the town closest to the epicenter of the main quake) and Beichuan (the town repeatedly struck by strong aftershocks including one registering M_{s} 6.1 on August 1, 2008), both in Sichuan Province, occupying a total of 2,419 km^{2} (934 sq mi). The Yingxiu liedu-XI zone is about 66 km (41 mi) long and 20 km (12 mi) wide along Wenchuan–Dujiangyan–Pengzhou; the Beichuan liedu-XI zone is about 82 km (51 mi) long and 15 km (9.3 mi) wide along An County–Beichuan–Pingwu. The area with liedu X (comparable to X on EMS, "destructive" and X on MM, "disastrous") spans 3,144 km^{2} (1,214 sq mi). The area affected by earthquakes exceeding liedu VI totals 440,442 km^{2} (170,056 sq mi), occupying an oval 936 km (582 mi) long and 596 km (370 mi) wide, spanning three provinces and one autonomous region.

QLARM (Quake Loss Alarms for Response and Mitigation) issues near-real-time estimates of fatalities and number of injured for earthquakes worldwide. Recent alerts can be found on the web page of the International Institute for Earth Simulation Foundation. Such an alert was issued 21 minutes after the May 12 Wenchuan earthquake of 2008. It had at first been assigned M7.5, internationally. This initial underestimate of the magnitude is a known problem with earthquakes of M8 and larger. Based on the M7.5 information, QLARM distributed an email to about 300 recipients estimating that 1,000 to 4,000 fatalities had occurred. After learning that the earthquake may measure M8, QLARM distributed a revised estimate of 40,000 to 100,000 fatalities. This information was distributed within 100 minutes of the Wenchuan earthquake.

The news and official reports of fatalities are often strongly misleading. After the Wenchuan earthquake, officials led the public to believe for more than a week that the fatalities numbered only a fraction of what they really were (Figure 1). At the very beginning, everyone expects the news reports to be an initial count that will grow, not however, after one week. After such a long time, the false news reports take on a reality in their own right and the theoretical loss calculations by experts are discarded.

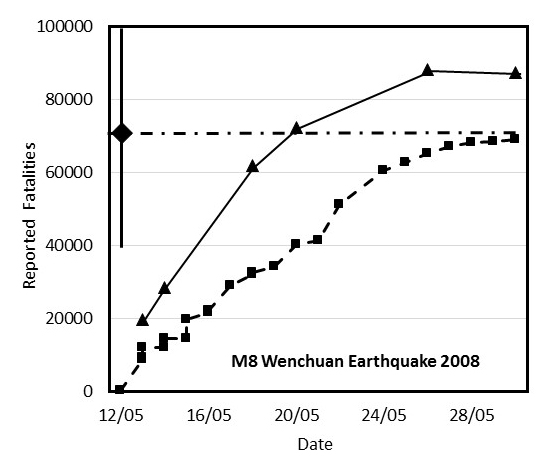
Figure 1: Official fatality reports for the Wenchuan M8 earthquake as a function of time. Squares show fatalities, triangles show the sum of fatalities plus missing persons, which equaled the number of fatalities in the end. The diamond is the QLARM estimate 100 minutes after the earthquake, with the range of possible values given by the solid, vertical line through the diamond. The horizontal dash-dotted line indicates the average value of fatalities calculated by QLARM.

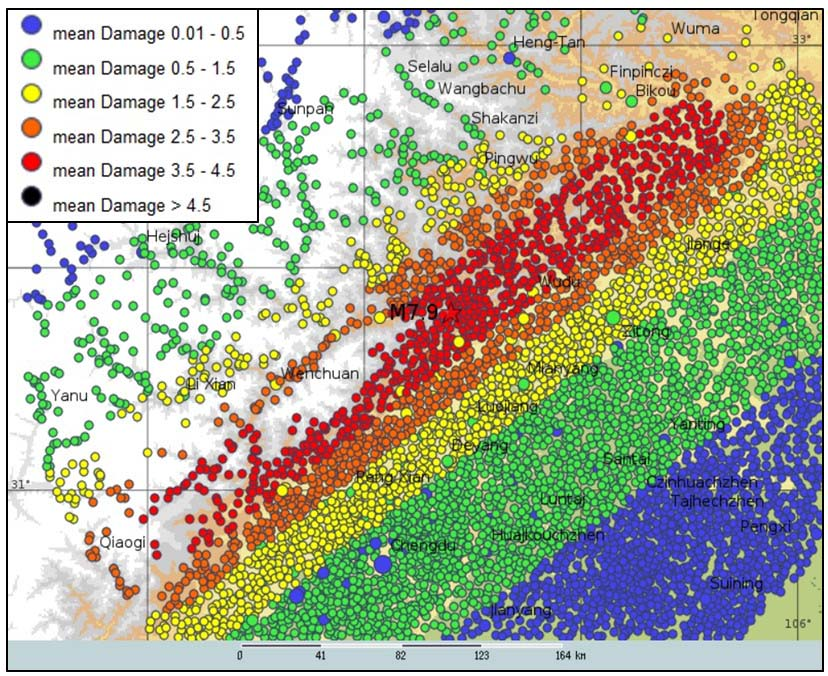
Figure 2: Map of settlements with the estimated mean damage due to the Wenchuan earthquake modeled as a line rupture extending as far as the aftershocks.

Once the extent of the rupture of the Wenchuan earthquake became known, QLARM calculated a more detail picture of the losses. Figure 2 shows a map of the expected mean damage of the settlements affected by the Wenchuan earthquake on a scale of 5. The resistance to shaking of buildings in large cities is assumed to be stronger than in villages, therefore the damage and percentage of fatalities in large cities is less than in villages.

=== Aftershocks ===
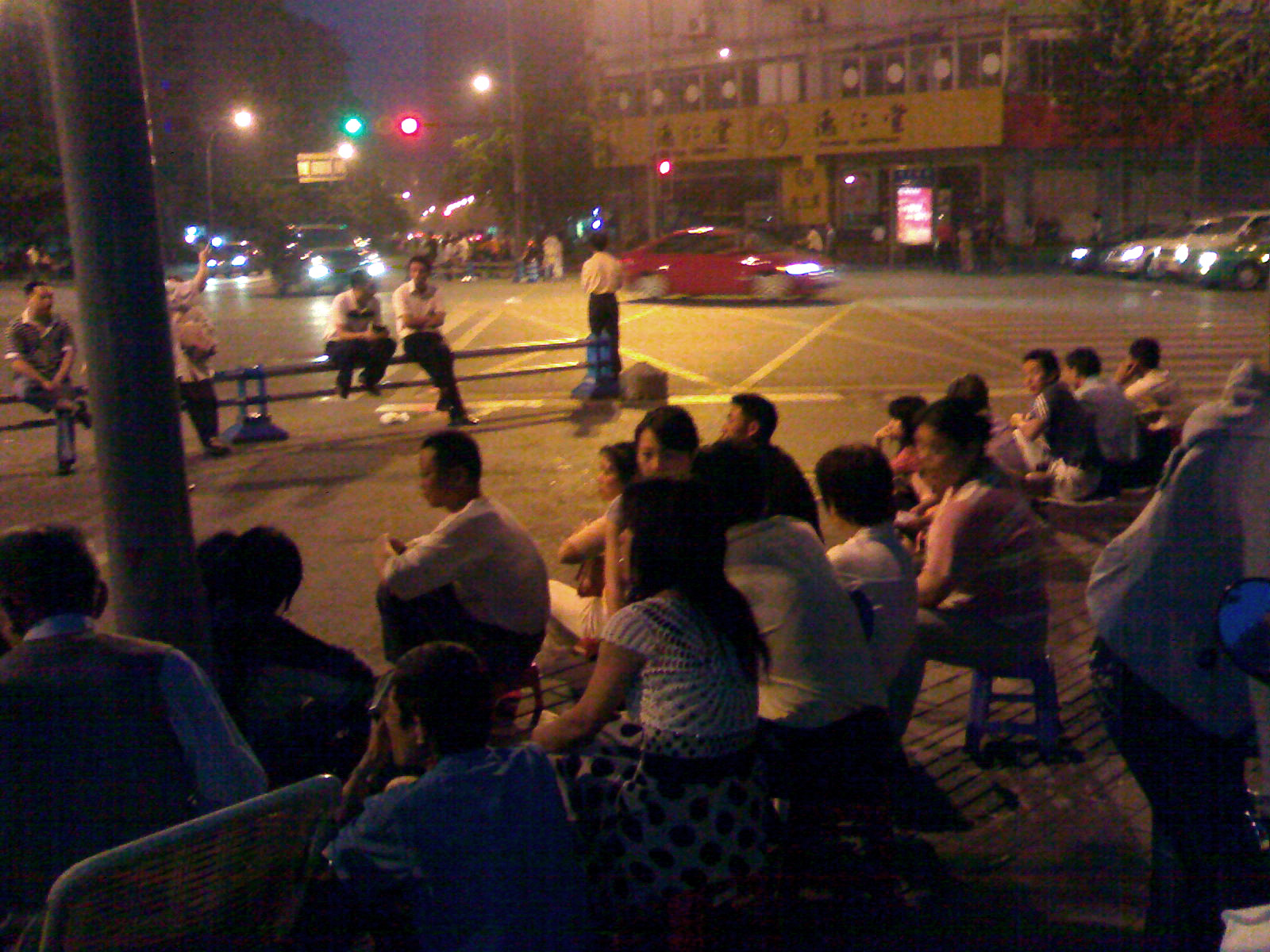
May 12: Residents of Chengdu, worried of potential aftershocks, gather for safety into the streets.

Between 64 and 104 major aftershocks, ranging in magnitude from 4.0 to 6.1, were recorded within 72 hours of the main quake. According to Chinese official counts, "by 12:00 CST, November 6, 2008, there had been 42,719 total aftershocks, of which 246 ranged from 4.0 M_{s}to 4.9 M_{s}, 34 from 5.0 M_{s}to 5.9 M_{s}, and 8 from 6.0 M_{s}to 6.4 M_{s}; the strongest aftershock measured 6.4 M_{s}." The latest aftershock exceeding M6 occurred on August 5, 2008.

(The M_{s}6.1 earthquake on August 30, 2008, in southern Sichuan was not part of this series because it was caused by a different fault. See 2008 Panzhihua earthquake for details.)

== Damage and casualties ==
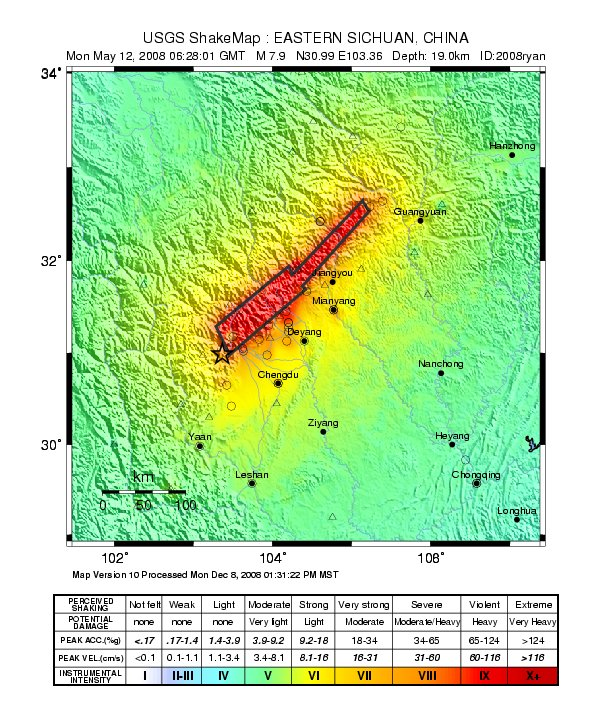
USGS ShakeMap

The earthquake had a magnitude of 8.0 M_{s}. and 7.9–8.3 M_{w}. The epicenter was in Wenchuan County, Ngawa Tibetan and Qiang Autonomous Prefecture, 80 km (50 mi) west-northwest of the provincial capital of Chengdu, with its main tremor occurring at 14:28:01.42 China Standard Time (06:28:01.42 UTC), on May 12, 2008, lasting for around two minutes; in the earthquake almost 80% of buildings were destroyed.

=== Extent of the tremors ===
Locations ordered by distance from epicenter (or time of propagation):

- Mainland China: All provincial-level divisions except Xinjiang, Jilin and Heilongjiang were physically affected by the quake.
- Hong Kong: Tremors were felt approximately three minutes after the quake, continuing for about half a minute. This was also the most distant earthquake known ever to be felt in Hong Kong. The intensity reached MMI III in Hong Kong.
- Macau: Tremors were felt approximately three minutes after the quake.
- Vietnam: Tremors were felt approximately five minutes after the earthquake in northern parts of Vietnam. The intensity was MMI III in Hanoi.
- Thailand: In parts of Thailand tremors were felt six minutes after the quake. Office buildings in Bangkok swayed for the next several minutes.
- Taiwan: It took about eight minutes for the quake to reach Taiwan, where the tremors continued for one to two minutes; no damage or injuries were reported. The intensity was MM III in Taipei.
- Mongolia: Tremors were felt approximately eight minutes after the earthquake in parts of Mongolia.
- Bangladesh: Tremors were felt eight and a half minutes after the quake in all parts of Bangladesh.
- Nepal: Tremors were felt approximately eight and a half minutes after the quake.
- India: Tremors were felt approximately nine minutes after the earthquake in parts of India.
- Pakistan: In parts of Northern Pakistan tremors were felt ten minutes after the quake.
- Russia: Tremors were felt in Tuva, no casualties reported.
- Myanmar: Tremors were felt in Kachin after ten minutes and in Shan after 13 minutes.

=== Immediate aftermath ===
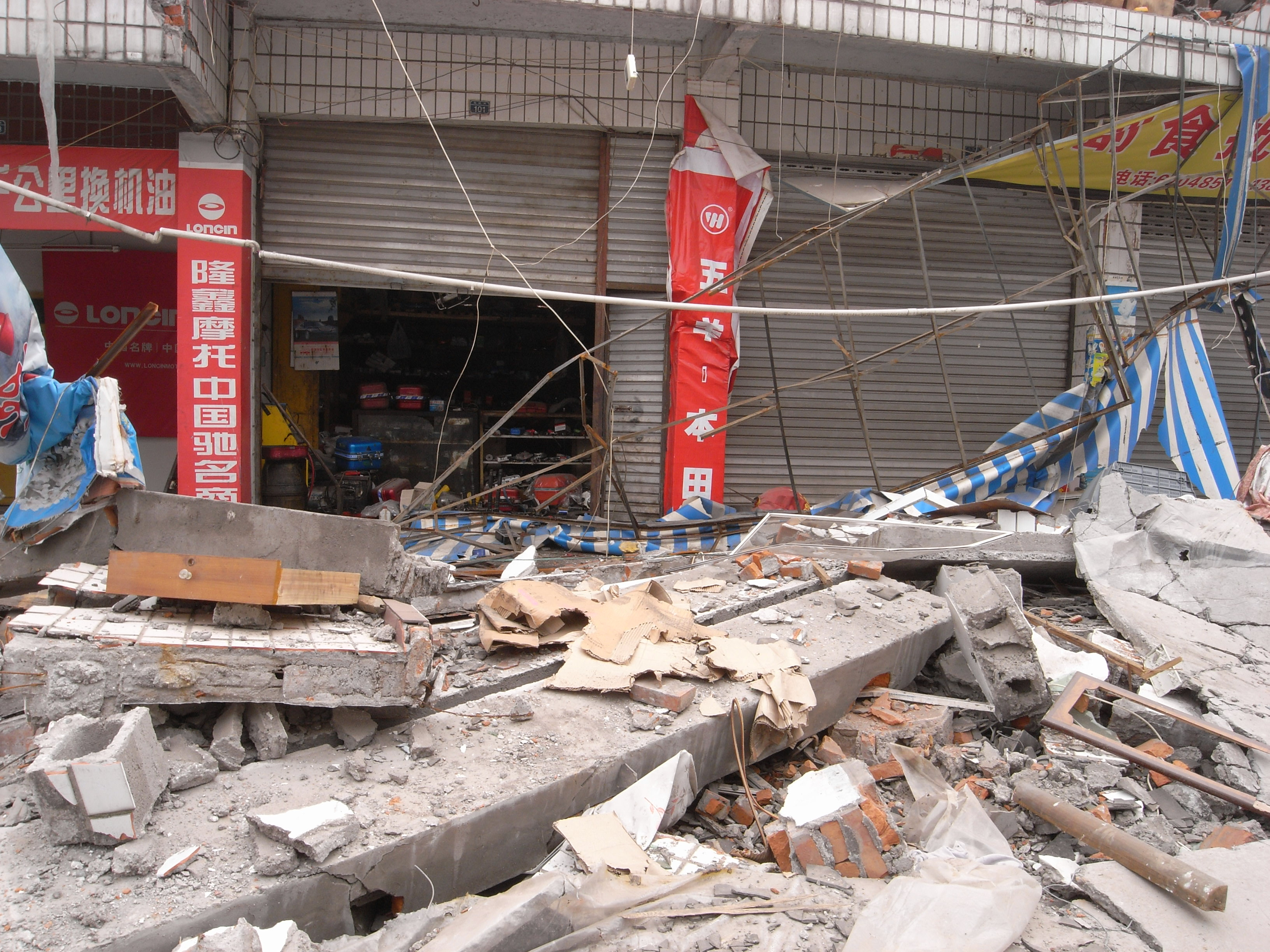
The outside of a warehouse in disarray following the earthquake.

Office buildings in Shanghai's financial district, including the Jin Mao Tower and the Hong Kong New World Tower, were evacuated. A receptionist at the Tibet Hotel in Chengdu said things were "calm" after the hotel evacuated its guests. Meanwhile, workers at a Ford plant in Sichuan were evacuated for about 10 minutes. Chengdu Shuangliu International Airport was shut down, and the control tower and regional radar control evacuated. One SilkAir flight was diverted and landed in Kunming as a result. Cathay Pacific delayed both legs of its quadruple daily Hong Kong to London route due to this disruption in air traffic services. Chengdu Shuangliu Airport reopened later on the evening of May 12, offering limited service as the airport began to be used as a staging area for relief operations.

Reporters in Chengdu said they saw cracks on walls of some residential buildings in the downtown areas, but no buildings collapsed. Many Beijing office towers were evacuated, including the building housing the media offices for the organizers of the 2008 Summer Olympics. None of the Olympic venues were damaged. Meanwhile, a cargo train carrying 13 petrol tanks derailed in Hui County, Gansu, and caught on fire after the rail was distorted.

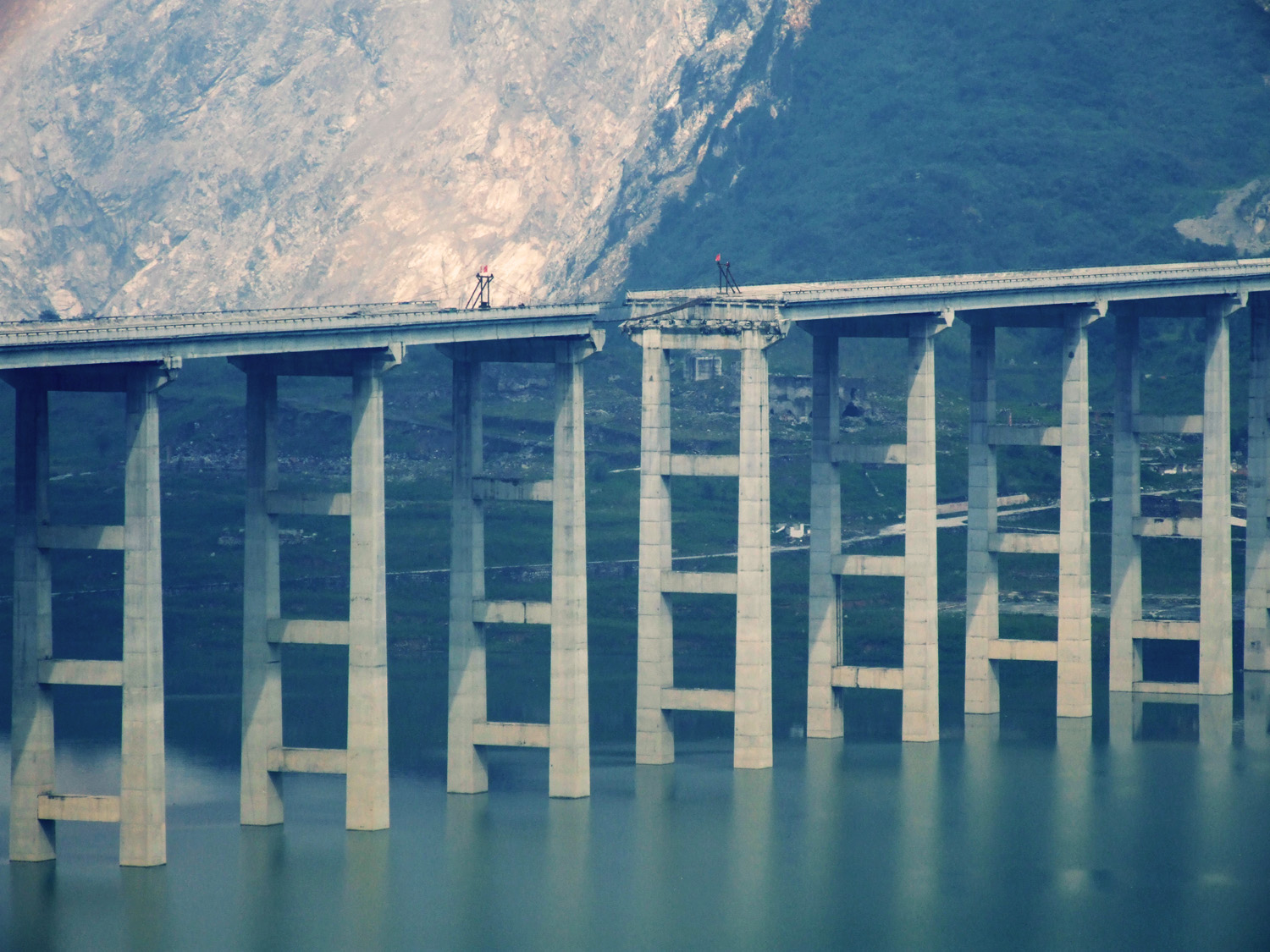
The Miaoziping Bridge of Dujiangyan –Wenchuan Expressway was damaged in the earthquake.

All of the highways into Wenchuan, and others throughout the province, were damaged, resulting in delayed arrival of the rescue troops. In Beichuan County, 80% of the buildings collapsed according to Xinhua News. In the city of Shifang, the collapse of two chemical plants led to leakage of some 80 tons of liquid ammonia, with hundreds of people reported buried. In the city of Dujiangyan, south-east of the epicenter, a whole school collapsed with 900 students buried and fewer than 60 survived. The Juyuan Middle School, where many teenagers were buried, was excavated by civilians and cranes. Dujiangyan is home of the Dujiangyan Irrigation System, an ancient water diversion project which is still in use and is a UNESCO World Heritage Site. The project's famous Fish Mouth was cracked but not severely damaged otherwise.

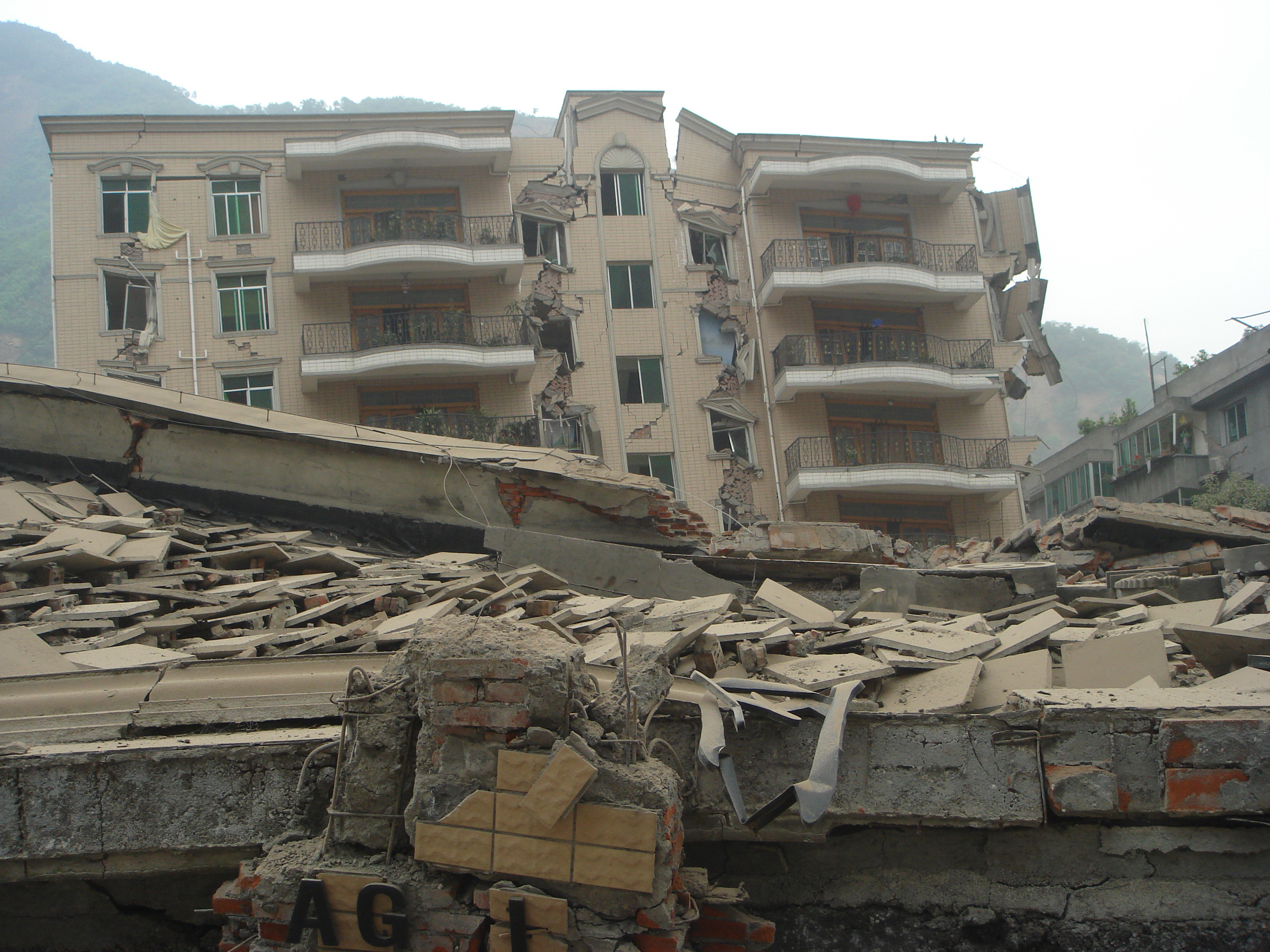
A bank building in Beichuan after the earthquake. A girl was found alive in the ruins 102 hours (4 days, 6 hours) after the earthquake.

Both the Shanghai Stock Exchange and the Shenzhen Stock Exchange suspended trading of companies based in southwestern China. Copper rose over speculations that production in southwestern China may be affected, and oil prices dropped over speculations that demand from China would fall.

Immediately after the earthquake event, mobile and terrestrial telecommunications were cut to the affected and surrounding area, with all internet capabilities cut to the Sichuan area too. Elements of telecommunications were restored by the government piece by piece over the next number of months as the situation in the Sichuan province gradually improved. Eventually, a handful of major news and media websites were made accessible online in the region, albeit with dramatically pared back webpages.

China Mobile had more than 2,300 base stations suspended due to power disruption or severe telecommunication traffic congestion. Half of the wireless communications were lost in the Sichuan province. China Unicom's service in Wenchuan and four nearby counties was cut off, with more than 700 towers suspended.

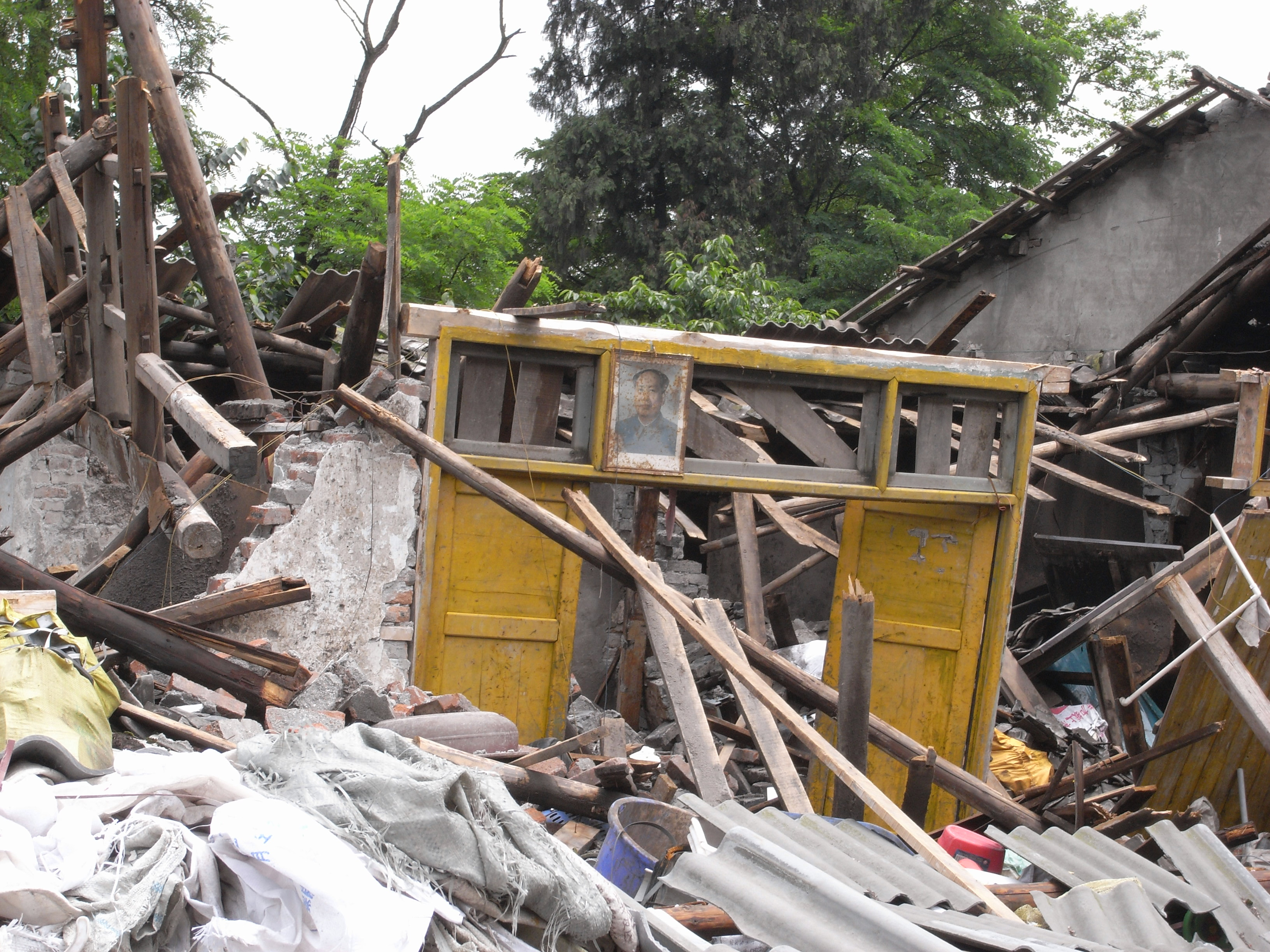
A single door frame bearing a portrait of Mao Zedong remained standing in a pile of debris.

Initially, officials were unable to contact the Wolong National Nature Reserve, home to around 280 giant pandas. However, the Foreign Ministry later said that a group of 31 British tourists visiting the Wolong Panda Reserve in the quake-hit area returned safe and uninjured to Chengdu. Nonetheless, the well-being of an even greater number of pandas in the neighbouring panda reserves remained unknown. Five security guards at the reserve were killed by the earthquake. Six pandas escaped after their enclosures were damaged. By May 20, two pandas at the reserve were found to be injured, while the search continued for another two adult pandas that went missing after the quake. By May 28, 2008, one panda was still missing. The missing panda was later found dead under the rubble of an enclosure. Nine-year-old Mao Mao, a mother of five at the breeding center, was discovered on June 9, her body crushed by a wall in her enclosure. Panda keepers and other workers placed her remains in a small wooden crate and buried her outside the breeding center.

The Zipingpu Hydropower Plant located 20 kilometres (12 mi) east of the epicenter was damaged. A May 24th inspection indicated that the damage was less severe than initially feared, and it remains structurally stable and safe. However, the Tulong reservoir upstream is in danger of collapse. About 2,000 troops have been allocated to Zipingpu, trying to release the pressure through a spillway. In total, 391 dams, most of them small, were reported damaged by the quake.

=== Casualties ===
Province		Deaths
Sichuan	Mianyang	21,963
Sichuan	Ngawa	20,258
Sichuan	Deyang	17,121
Sichuan	Guangyuan	4,822
Sichuan	Chengdu	4,276
Sichuan	Nanchong	254
Sichuan	Suining	27
Sichuan	Ziyang	26
Sichuan	Meishan	20
Sichuan	Ya'an	15
Sichuan	Bazhong	10
Sichuan	Garzê	9
Sichuan	Leshan	8
Sichuan	Neijiang	7
Sichuan	Dazhou	4
Sichuan	Liangshan	3
Sichuan	Zigong	2
Sichuan	Luzhou	1
Sichuan	Guang'an	1
Sichuan	Total	68,636
Gansu		365
Shaanxi		122
Chongqing		18
Henan		2
Guizhou		1
Hubei		1
Hunan		1
Yunnan		1
Total		69,180

According to Chinese state officials, the quake caused 69,196 known deaths; 18,379 people are listed as missing, and 374,176 injured. This estimate includes 158 earthquake relief workers who were killed in landslides as they tried to repair roads. A report by Swiss Re placed the number of dead, including those missing, at 87,499.

One rescue team reported only 2,300 survivors from the town of Yingxiu in Wenchuan County, out of a total population of about 9,000. 3,000 to 5,000 people were killed in Beichuan County, Sichuan alone; in the same location, 10,000 people were injured and 80% of the buildings were destroyed. The old county seat of Beichuan was abandoned and preserved as part of the Beichuan Earthquake Museum. Eight schools were toppled in Dujiangyan. A 56-year-old was killed in Dujiangyan during a rescue attempt on the Lingyanshan Ropeway, where due to the earthquake 11 tourists from Taiwan had been trapped inside cable cars since May 13. A 4-year-old boy named Zhu Shaowei (Chinese: 朱绍维) was also killed in Mianzhu when a house collapsed on him and another was reported missing.

Experts point out that the earthquake hit an area that had been largely neglected and untouched by China's economic rise. Health care was poor in inland areas such as Sichuan, highlighting the widening gap between prosperous urban dwellers and struggling rural people. Vice Minister of Health Gao Qiang told reporters in Beijing that the "public health care system in China is insufficient." The Vice Minister of Health also suggested that the government would pick up the costs of care to earthquake victims, many of whom have little or no insurance: "The government should be responsible for providing medical treatment to them," he said.

In terms of school casualties, thousands of school children died due to shoddy construction. In Mianyang City, seven schools collapsed, burying at least 1,700 people. At least 7,000 school buildings throughout the province collapsed. Another 700 students were buried in a school in Hanwang. At least 600 students and staff died at Juyuan Elementary School. Up to 1,300 children and teachers died at Beichuan Middle School. According to Tan Zuoren, 5,600 pupils were dead or missing from the 64 schools Tan investigated in the quake zone. Tan was detained after he published such a casualties number.

Tang Xuemei was in a school dormitory building during the earthquake. She was trapped for 28 hours before being rescued. Her left leg had to be amputated. She became a Paralympic sitting volleyball player and became Paralympic champion in 2012 winning the silver medal at the 2020 Summer Paralympics. Niu Yu was in a school classroom building during the earthquake. She was trapped for three days before being rescued. Her right leg had to be amputated. She became a disability rights advocate and walked with her prosthetic leg at the runway at Shanghai Fashion Week in 2021.

Details of school casualties had been under non-governmental investigation since December 2008 by volunteers including artist and architect Ai Weiwei, who had been constantly posting updates on his blog since March 2009. The official tally of students killed in the earthquake was not released until May 7, 2009, almost a year after the earthquake. According to the state-run Xinhua news agency, the earthquake killed 5,335 students and left another 546 children disabled. Some parents believe the real figure is twice that officially cited. The executive vice governor of Sichuan Wei Hong said the student death toll is 19,065. Mr. Wei noted the toll was incomplete as the officials were still tallying the final number. In the aftermath of the earthquake, the Chinese government declared that parents who had lost their only children would get free treatment from fertility clinics to reverse vasectomies and tubal ligations conducted by family planning authorities.

=== Property damage ===
The earthquake left at least 5 million people without housing, although the number could be as high as 11 million. Millions of livestock and a significant amount of agriculture were also destroyed, including 12.5 million animals, mainly birds. In the Sichuan province a million pigs died out of 60 million total. Catastrophe modeling firm AIR Worldwide reported official estimates of insurers' losses at US$1 billion from the earthquake; estimated total damage exceeded US$20 billion. It values Chengdu, at the time having an urban population of 4.5 million people, at around US$115 billion, with only a small portion covered by insurance.

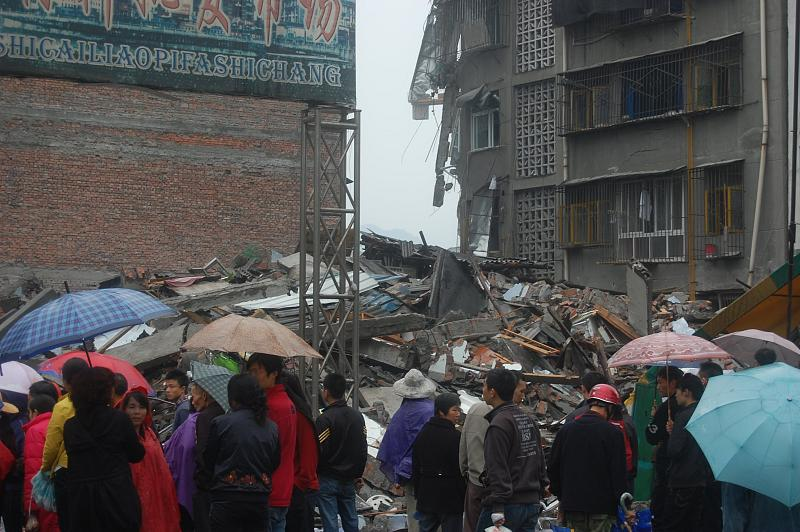
Rain was among the many problems affecting the area in the aftermath of the earthquake. Here, a group of onlookers examine a collapsed building in the rain.

Reginald DesRoches, a professor of civil and environmental engineering at Georgia Tech, pointed out that the massive damage of properties and houses in the earthquake area was because China did not create an adequate seismic design code until after the devastating 1976 Tangshan earthquake. DesRoches said: "If the buildings were older and built prior to that 1976 earthquake, chances are they weren't built for adequate earthquake forces."

In the days following the disaster, an international reconnaissance team of engineers was dispatched to the region to make a detailed preliminary survey of damaged buildings. Their findings show a variety of reasons why many constructions failed to withstand the earthquake.

News reports indicate that the poorer, rural villages were hardest hit. Swaminathan Krishnan, assistant professor of civil engineering and geophysics at the California Institute of Technology said: "the earthquake occurred in the rural part of China. Presumably, many of the buildings were just built; they were not designed, so to speak." Swaminathan Krishnan further added: "There are very strong building codes in China, which take care of earthquake issues and seismic design issues. But many of these buildings presumably were quite old and probably were not built with any regulations overseeing them."

=== Later casualties ===
Strong aftershocks continued even months after the main quake. On May 25, an aftershock of 6.0 M_{w} (6.4 M_{s} according to CEA) hit northeast of the original earthquake's epicenter, in Qingchuan County, Sichuan, causing eight deaths, 1,000 injuries, and destroying thousands of buildings. On May 27, two aftershocks, one 5.2 M_{w} in Qingchuan County and one 5.7 M_{w} in Ningqiang County, Shaanxi, led to the collapse of more than 420,000 homes and injured 63 people. The same area suffered two more aftershocks of 5.6 and 6.0 M_{s} (5.8 and 5.5 M_{w}, respectively, according to USGS) on July 23, resulting in 1 death, 6 serious injuries, the collapse of hundreds of homes and damaging kilometers of highways. Pingwu County and Beichuan County, Sichuan, also northeast of Wenchuan and close to the epicenter of another earthquake in 1976, suffered a 6.1 M_{s} aftershock (5.7 M_{w} according to USGS) on August 1; it caused 2 deaths, 345 injuries, the collapse of 707 homes, damage to over 1,000 homes, and blocked 25 kilometres (16 mi) of country roads. As late as August 5, yet another aftershock of 6.1 M_{s} (6.2 M_{w} according to USGS) hit Qingchuan, Sichuan, causing 1 death, 32 injuries, telecommunication interruptions, and widespread hill slides blocking roads in the area including a national highway.

==== Government data ====
Executive vice governor Wei Hong confirmed on November 21, 2008, that more than 90,000 people in total were dead or missing in the earthquake. He stated that 200,000 homes had been rebuilt, and 685,000 were under reconstruction, but 1.94 million households were still without permanent shelter. 1,300 schools had been reconstructed, with initial relocation of 25 townships, including Beichuan and Wenchuan, two of the most devastated areas. The government spent $441 billion on relief and reconstruction efforts.

== Rescue efforts ==
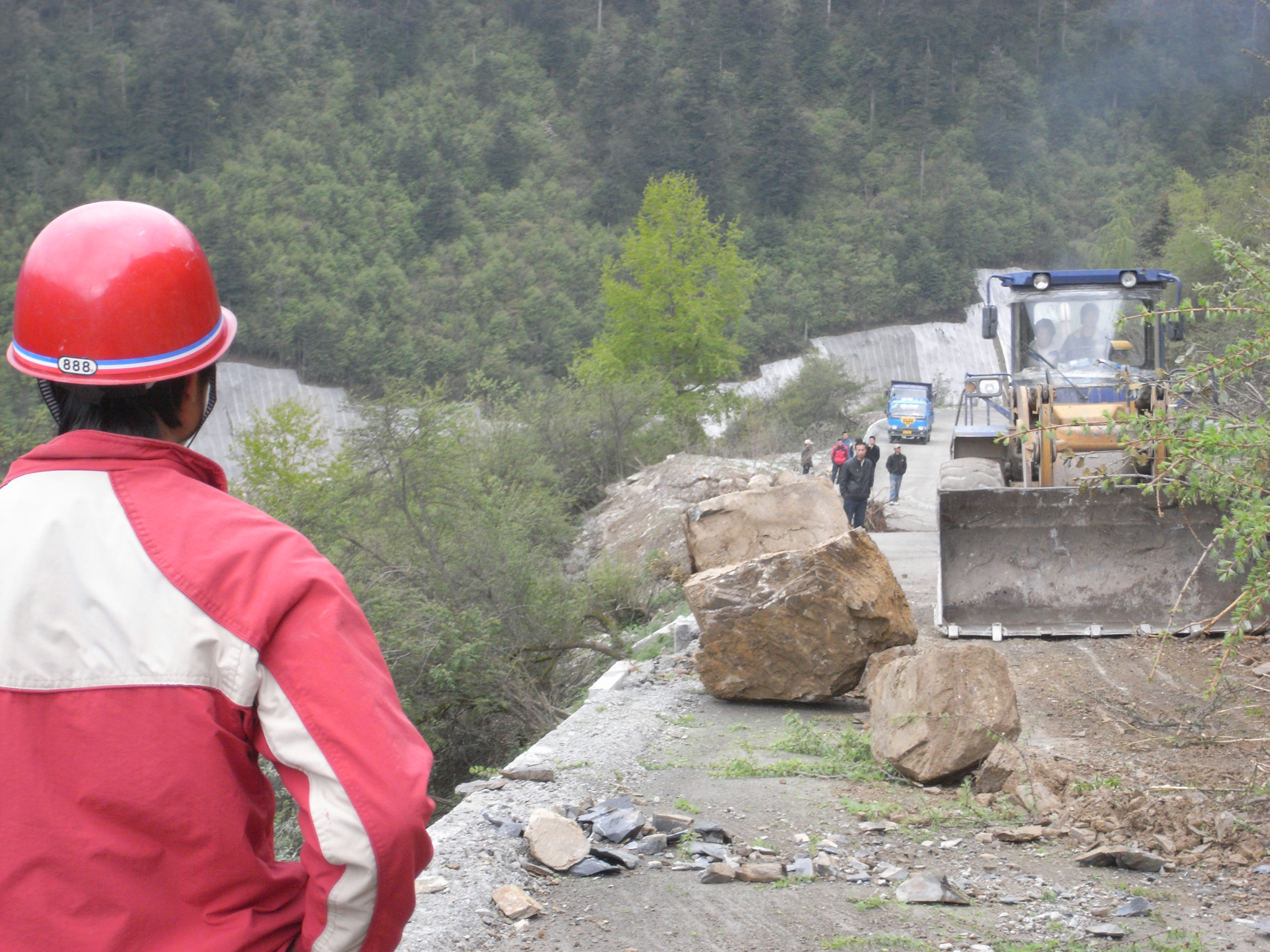
Persistent rain, as well as rock slides and a layer of mud coating on the main roads, such as the one above, hindered rescue officials' efforts to enter the target region.

General Secretary of the Chinese Communist Party Hu Jintao announced that the disaster response would be rapid. Just 90 minutes after the earthquake, Premier Wen Jiabao, who has an academic background in geomechanics, flew to the earthquake area to oversee the rescue work. Soon afterward, the Ministry of Health stated that it had sent ten emergency medical teams to Wenchuan County. On the same day, the Chengdu Military Region Command dispatched 50,000 troops and armed police to help with disaster relief work in Wenchuan County. However, due to the rough terrain and proximity of the quake's epicenter, the soldiers found it difficult to get help to the rural regions of the province. Premier Wen ordered the People's Liberation Army by saying, "It is the people who have raised you. It's up to you to see what to do! Even if it means walking on foot, you must nonetheless walk in there anyways. (Chinese: 是人民养育了你们, 你们自己看着办! 你们就是靠双腿走, 也要给我走进去)" However, PLA senior commander Guo Boxiong only listened to former CCP General Secretary Jiang Zemin's order, neither Wen Jiabao's or Hu Jintao's. The first 72 critical rescue hours were wasted. The New York Times reported "the troops were unprepared to save lives in the first 72 hours, when thousands were buried under toppled masonry and every minute mattered."

The National Disaster Relief Commission initiated a "Level II emergency contingency plan", which covers the most serious class of natural disasters. The plan rose to Level I at 22:15 CST, May 12.

An earthquake emergency relief team of 184 people (consisting of 12 people from the State Seismological Bureau, 150 from the Beijing Military Area Command, and 22 from the Armed Police General Hospital) left Beijing from Nanyuan Airport late May 12 in two military transport planes to travel to Wenchuan County.

Many rescue teams, including that of the Taipei Fire Department from Taiwan, were reported ready to join the rescue effort in Sichuan as early as Wednesday. However, the Red Cross Society of China said that (on May 13) "it was inconvenient currently due to the traffic problem to the hardest hit areas closest to the epicenter." The Red Cross Society of China also stated that the disaster areas needed tents, medical supplies, drinking water and food; however, it recommended donating cash instead of other items, as it had not been possible to reach roads that were completely damaged or places that were blocked off by landslides. Landslides continuously threatened the progress of a search and rescue group of 80 men, each carrying about 40 kg of relief supplies, from a motorized infantry brigade under commander Yang Wenyao, as they tried to reach the ethnically Tibetan village of Sier at a height of 4000 m above sea level in Pingwu county. The extreme terrain conditions precluded the use of helicopter evacuation, and over 300 of the Tibetan villagers were stranded in their demolished village for five days without food and water before the rescue group finally arrived to help the injured and stranded villagers down the mountain.

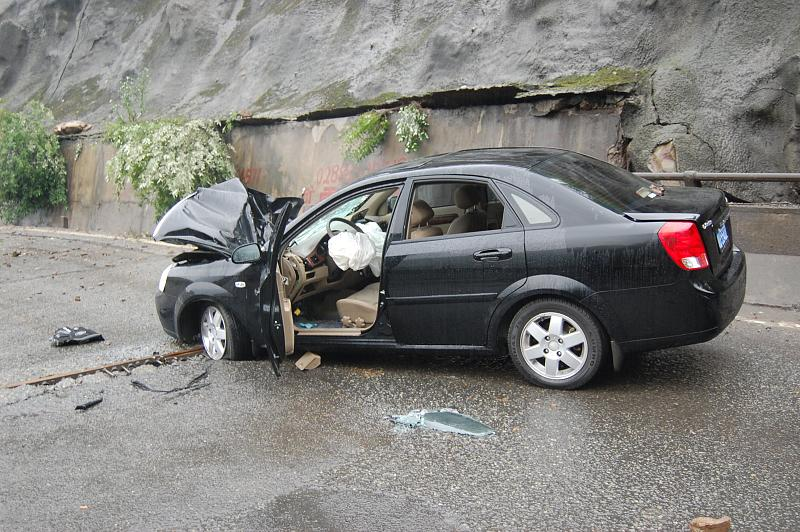
Falling debris, such as the object that landed on this vehicle, hindered rescue workers' progress as they attempted to cross the mountain.

Persistent heavy rain and landslides in Wenchuan County and the nearby area badly affected rescue efforts. At the start of rescue operations on May 12, 20 helicopters were deployed for the delivery of food, water, and emergency aid, and also the evacuation of the injured and reconnaissance of quake-stricken areas. By 17:37 CST on May 13, a total of over 15,600 troops and militia reservists from the Chengdu Military Region had joined the rescue force in the heavily affected areas. A commander reported from Yingxiu Town, Wenchuan, that around 3,000 survivors were found, while the status of the other inhabitants (around 9,000) remained unclear. The 1,300 rescuers reached the epicenter, and 300 pioneer troops reached the seat of Wenchuan at about 23:30 CST. By 12:17 CST, May 14, 2008, communication in the seat of Wenchuan was partly revived. On the afternoon of May 14, 15 Special Operations Troops, along with relief supplies and communications gear, parachuted into inaccessible Mao County, northeast of Wenchuan.

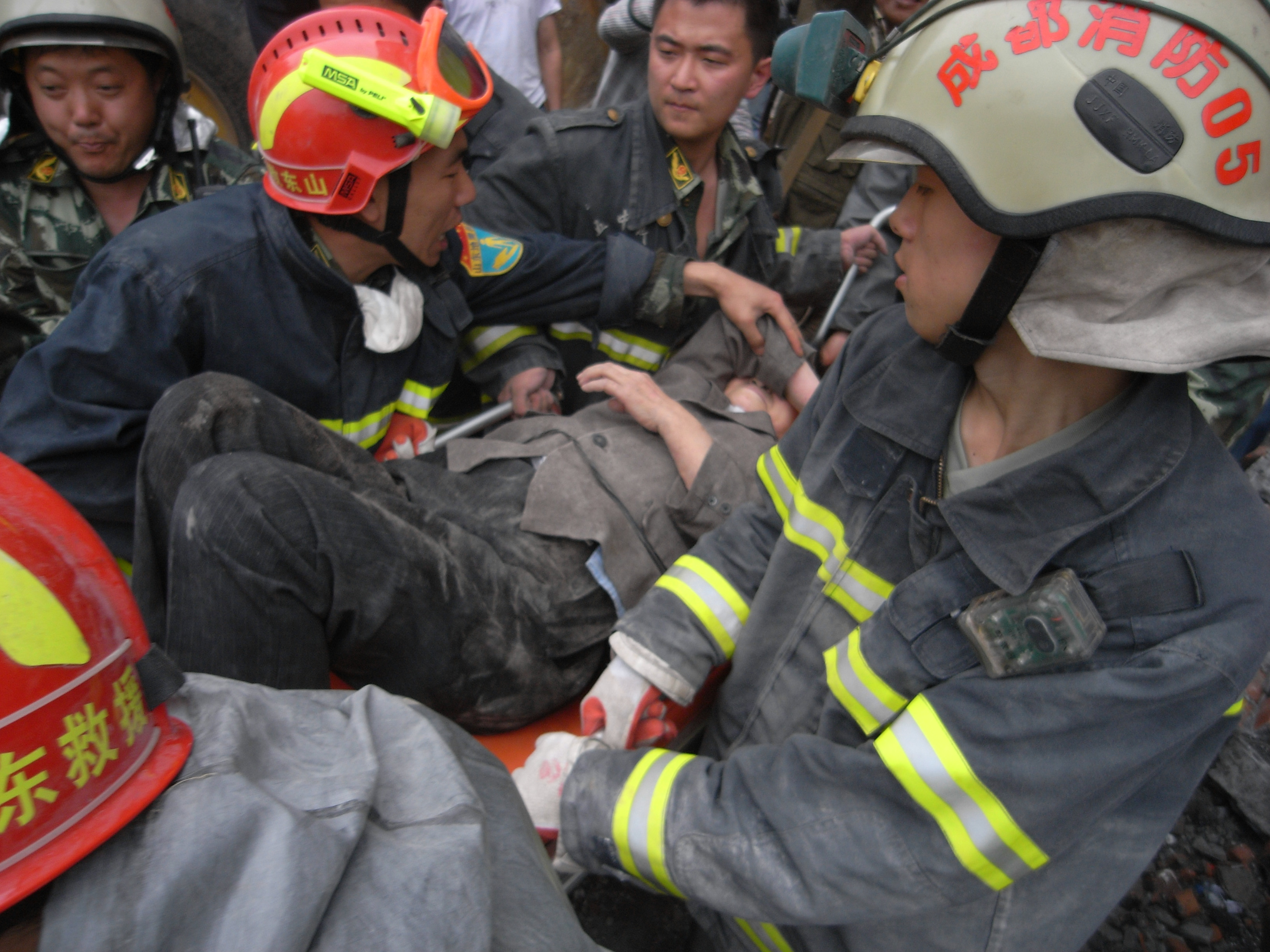
This elderly woman was rescued and placed on a stretcher after being trapped for over 50 hours.

By May 15, Premier Wen Jiabao ordered the deployment of an additional 90 helicopters, of which 60 were to be provided by the PLAAF, and 30 were to be provided by the civil aviation industry, bringing the total number of aircraft deployed in relief operations by the air force, army, and civil aviation to over 150, resulting in the largest non-combat airlifting operation in People's Liberation Army history.

Beijing accepted the aid of the Tzu Chi Foundation from Taiwan late on May 13. Tzu Chi was the first force from outside the People's Republic of China to join the rescue effort. China stated it would gratefully accept international help to cope with the quake.

A direct chartered cargo flight was made by China Airlines from Taiwan Taoyuan International Airport to Chengdu Shuangliu International Airport sending some 100 tons of relief supplies donated by the Tzu Chi Foundation and the Red Cross Society of Taiwan to the affected areas. Approval from mainland Chinese authorities was sought, and the chartered flight departed Taipei at 17:00 CST, May 15 and arrived in Chengdu by 20:30 CST. A rescue team from the Red Cross in Taiwan was also scheduled to depart Taipei on a Mandarin Airlines direct chartered flight to Chengdu at 15:00 CST on May 16.

Francis Marcus of the International Federation of the Red Cross praised the Chinese rescue effort as "swift and very efficient" in Beijing on Tuesday. But he added the scale of the disaster was such that "we can't expect that the government can do everything and handle every aspect of the needs". The Economist noted that China reacted to the disaster "rapidly and with uncharacteristic openness", contrasting it with Burma's secretive response to Cyclone Nargis, which devastated that country 10 days before the earthquake.

On May 16, rescue groups from South Korea, Japan, Singapore, Russia and Taiwan arrived to join the rescue effort. The United States shared some of its satellite images of the quake-stricken areas with Chinese authorities. During the weekend, the US sent into China two U.S. Air Force C-17's carrying supplies, which included tents and generators. Xinhua had reported a total of more than 100,000 Chinese troops, medics, and volunteers from other provinces that were involved in the rescue effort across 58 counties and cities in Sichuan.

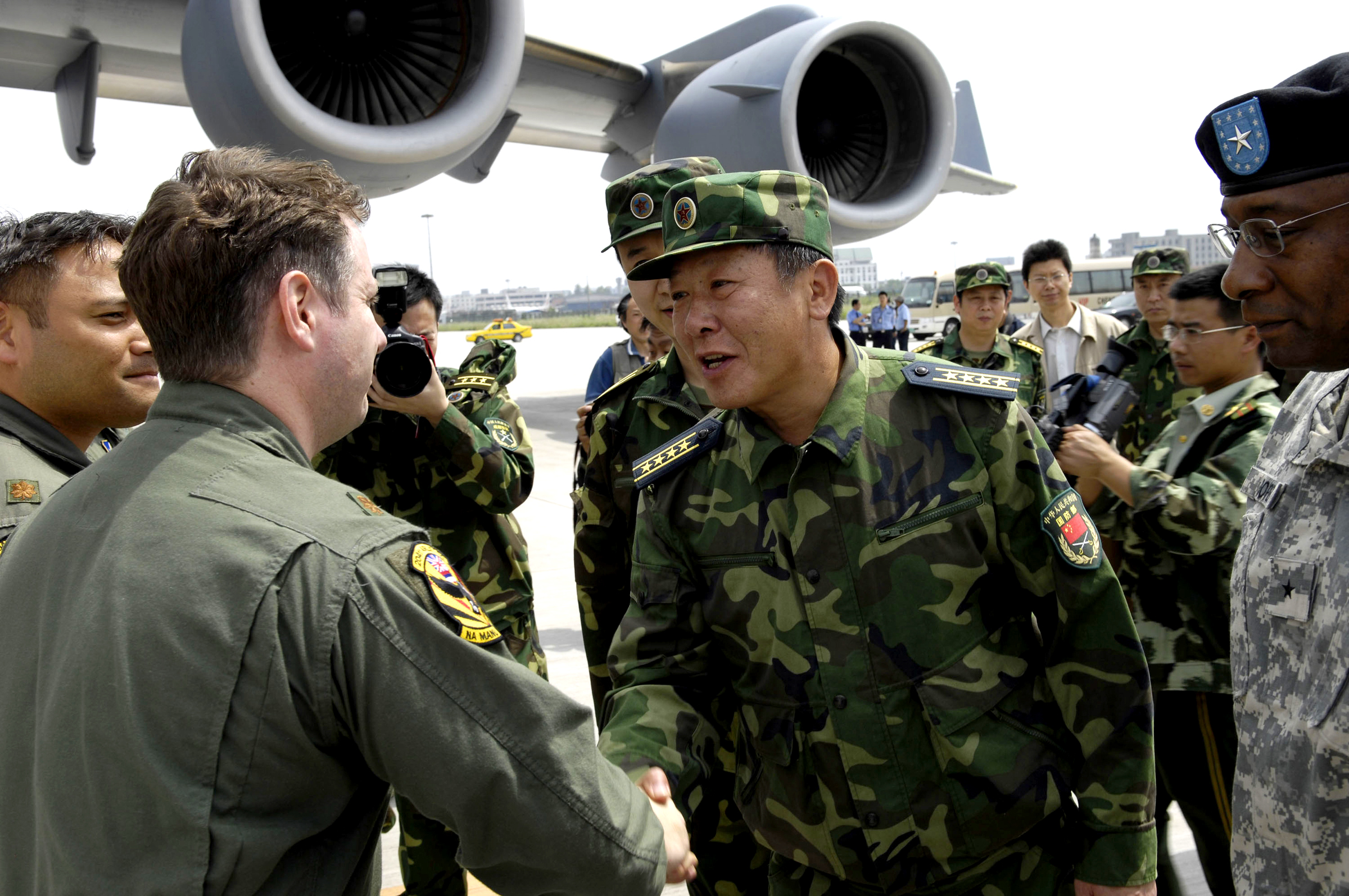
Senior Capt. Guan Youfei greeted the first of two U.S. aircrews delivering earthquake relief supplies

The Internet was extensively used for passing information to aid rescue and recovery efforts. For example, the official news agency Xinhua set up an online rescue request center in order to find the blind spots of disaster recovery. After knowing that rescue helicopters had trouble landing into the epicenter area in Wenchuan, a student proposed a landing spot online and it was chosen as the first touchdown place for the helicopters. Volunteers also set up several websites to help store contact information for victims and evacuees. On May 31, a rescue helicopter carrying earthquake survivors and crew members crashed in fog and turbulence in Wenchuan county, no one survived.

Rescue efforts performed by the Chinese government were praised by western media, especially in comparison with Myanmar's blockage of foreign aid during Cyclone Nargis, as well as China's previous performance during the 1976 Tangshan earthquake. China's openness during the media coverage of the Sichuan earthquake led a professor at the Peking University to say, "This is the first time [that] the Chinese media has lived up to international standards". Los Angeles Times praised China's media coverage of the quake of being "democratic".

Rescue efforts also came from Jet Li's One Foundation which saw the martial arts actor Wu Jing assisting in the efforts.

In Tuanshan Village, Longmenshan Town, Pengzhou, the Strong-Willed Pig was rescued suffering only skin trauma after being buried under rubble for 36 days. The pig had survived off rainwater and charcoal, but lost 100 kg from its original 150 kg weight. The Jianchuan Museum bought the pig from its original owner and gave the pig a new home on the museum premises. The pig became famous nationwide as it "illustrated the spirit of never giving up."

=== "Quake lakes" ===
As a result of the earthquake and the many strong aftershocks, many rivers became blocked by large landslides, which resulted in the formation of "quake lakes" behind the blockages; these massive amounts of water were pooling up at a high rate behind the natural landslide dams and it was feared that the blockages would eventually crumble under the weight of the ever-increasing water mass, potentially endangering the lives of millions of people living downstream. As of May 27, 2008, 34 lakes had formed due to earthquake debris blocking and damming rivers, and it was estimated that 28 of them were still of potential danger to the local people. Entire villages had to be evacuated because of the resultant flooding.

The most precarious of these quake-lakes was the one located in the extremely difficult terrain at Mount Tangjia in Beichuan County, Sichuan, accessible only by foot or air; an Mi-26T heavy lift helicopter belonging to the China Flying Dragon Special Aviation Company was used to bring heavy earthmoving tractors to the affected location. This operation was coupled with the work done by PLAAF Mi-17 helicopters bringing in PLA engineering corps, explosive specialists and other personnel to join 1,200 soldiers who arrived on site by foot. Five tons of fuel to operate the machinery was airlifted to the site, where a sluice was constructed to allow the safe discharge of the bottle-necked water. Downstream, more than 200,000 people were evacuated from Mianyang by June 1 in anticipation of the dam bursting.

== Domestic reactions ==
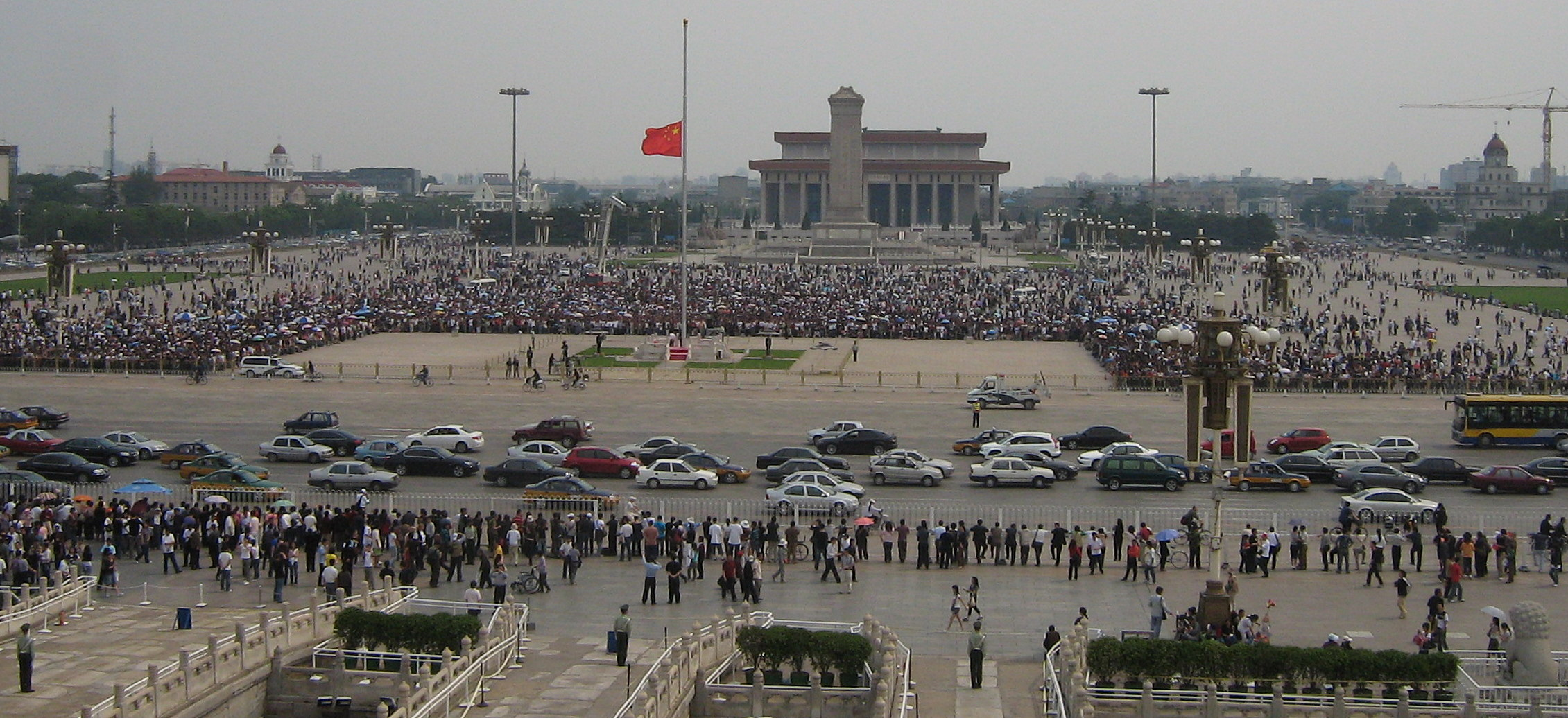
On May 19, 2008, people mourned for the earthquake victims at Tiananmen Square, Beijing, with the flag at half mast throughout the mourning period.

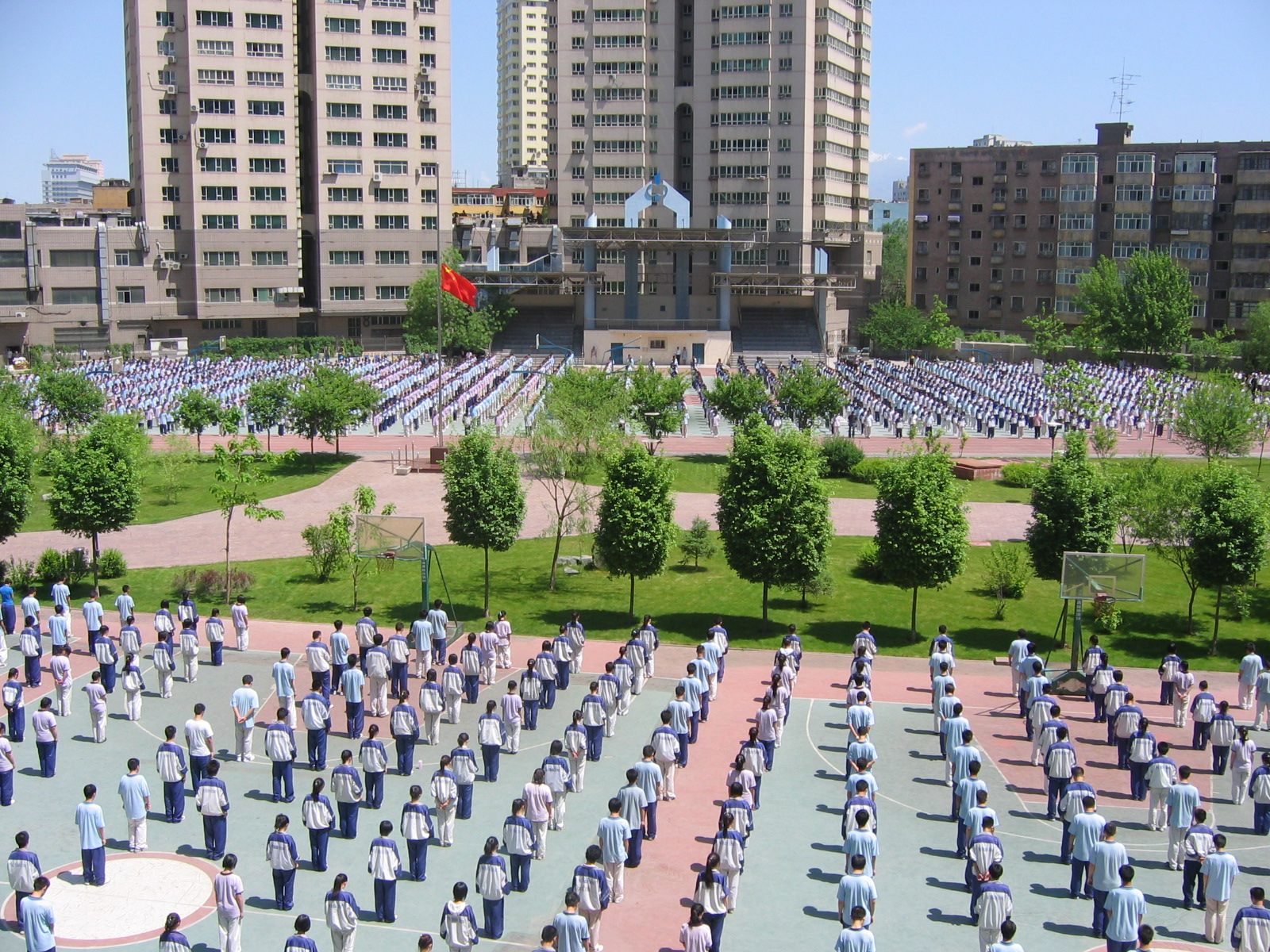
Students paying tribute for earthquake victims in Urumqi

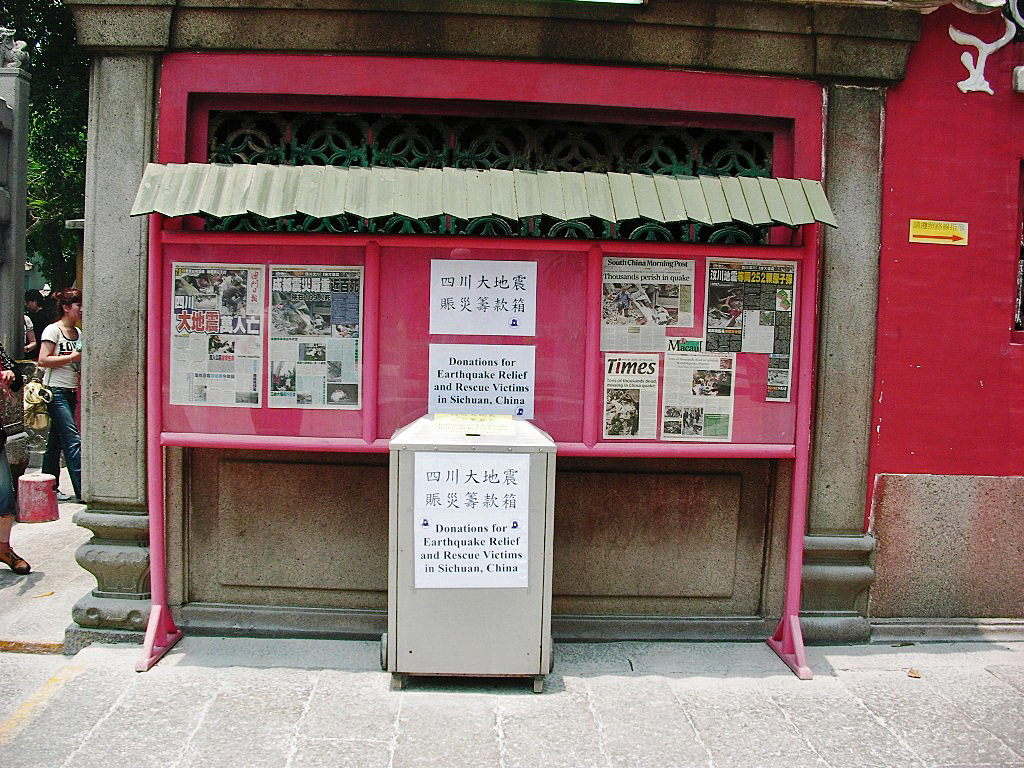
Donation box for Sichuan earthquake victims, A-Ma Temple, Macao, May 2008.

The State Council declared a three-day period of national mourning for the quake victims starting from May 19, 2008; the PRC's National Flag and Regional Flags of Hong Kong and Macau Special Administrative Regions flown at half mast. It was the first time that a national mourning period had been declared for something other than the death of a state leader, and many have called it the biggest display of mourning since the death of Mao Zedong in 1976. At 14:28 CST on May 19, 2008, a week after the earthquake, the Chinese public held a moment of silence. People stood silent for three minutes while air defense, police and fire sirens, and the horns of vehicles, vessels and trains sounded. Cars and trucks on Beijing's roads also came to a halt.

The Ningbo Organizing Committee of the Beijing Olympic torch relay announced that the relay, scheduled to take place in Ningbo during national mourning, would be suspended throughout the mourning period. The route of the torch through the country was scaled down, and there was a minute of silence when the next leg started in city of Ruijin, Jiangxi on the Wednesday after the quake.

Many websites converted their home page to black and white; Sina.com and Sohu, major internet portals, limited their homepages to news items and removed all advertisements. Chinese video sharing websites Youku and Tudou displayed a black background and placed multiple videos showing earthquake footage and news reports. The Chinese version of MSN, cn.msn.com, also displayed banner ads about the earthquake and the relief efforts. Other entertainment websites, including various gaming sites, such as the Chinese servers for World of Warcraft, had shut down altogether, or had corresponding links to earthquake donations. After the moments of silence, in Tiananmen Square, crowds spontaneously burst out cheering various slogans, including "Long Live China".

All Mainland Chinese television stations (along with some stations in Hong Kong and expatriate communities) cancelled all regularly scheduled programming, displayed their logo in grayscale, and replaced their cancelled programmes with live earthquake footage from CCTV-1 for multiple days after the quake. Even pay television channels (such as Channel V) had their programmes suspended.

On the evening of May 18, CCTV-1 hosted a special four-hour program called The Giving of Love (simplified Chinese: 爱的奉献; traditional Chinese: 愛的奉獻), hosted by regulars from the CCTV New Year's Gala and round-the-clock coverage anchor Bai Yansong. It was attended by a wide range of entertainment, literary, business and political figures from mainland China, Hong Kong, Singapore and Taiwan. Donations of the evening totalled 1.5 billion Chinese Yuan (~US$208 million). Of the donations, CCTV gave the biggest corporate contribution at ¥50 million. Almost at the same time in Taiwan, a similarly themed programme was on air hosted by the sitting president Ma Ying-jeou. In June, Hong Kong actor Jackie Chan, who donated $1.57 million to the victims, made a music video alongside other artists entitled "Promise"; the song was composed by Andy Lau. The Artistes 512 Fund Raising Campaign, an 8-hour fundraising marathon, was held on June 1 in Hong Kong; it was attended by some 200 Sinosphere musicians and celebrities. In Singapore, MediaCorp Channel 8 hosted a 'live' programme 让爱川流不息 to raise funds for the victims.

== Collapse of schoolhouses ==
After the earthquake in 2008, some parents helped schools by preparing and cooking lunches for the students.

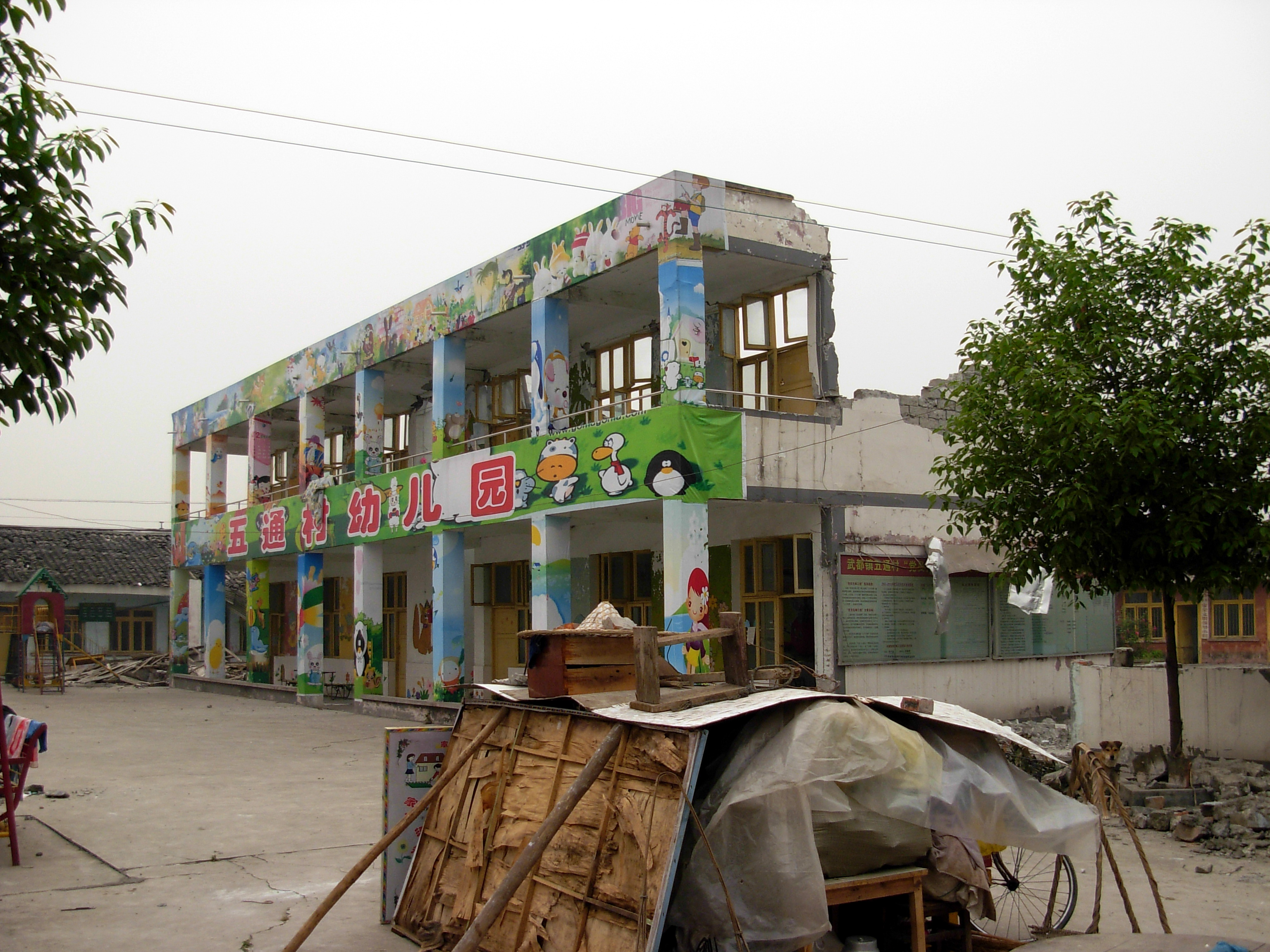
This kindergarten was among the many schools in the disaster region that suffered heavy structural damage.

Although the Chinese government was initially praised for its response to the quake (especially in comparison to Myanmar's ruling military junta's blockade of aid during Cyclone Nargis), it then saw an erosion in confidence over the school construction scandal.

The central government estimates that over 7,000 inadequately engineered schoolrooms collapsed in the earthquake. Chinese citizens have since invented a catch phrase: "tofu-dregs schoolhouses" (Chinese: 豆腐渣校舍), to mock both the quality and the quantity of these inferior constructions that killed so many school children. Due to the one-child policy, many families lost their only child when schools in the region collapsed during the earthquake. Consequently, Sichuan provincial and local officials have lifted the restriction for families whose only child was either killed or severely injured in the disaster. So-called "illegal children" under 18 years of age may be registered as legal replacements for their dead siblings; if the dead child was illegal, no further outstanding fines would apply. Reimbursement would not, however, be offered for fines that were already levied.

On May 29, 2008, government officials began inspecting the ruins of thousands of schools that collapsed, searching for clues about why they crumbled. Thousands of parents around the province have accused local officials and builders of cutting corners in school construction, citing that after the quake other nearby buildings were little damaged. In the aftermath of the quake, many local governments promised to formally investigate the school collapses, but as of July 17, 2008, across Sichuan, parents of children lost in collapsed schools complained they had yet to receive any reports. Local officials urged them not to protest but the parents demonstrated and demanded an investigation. Furthermore, censors discouraged stories of poorly built schools from being published in the media and there was an incident where police drove the protestors away.

In the China Digital Times an article reports a close analysis by an alleged Chinese construction engineer known online as "Book Blade" (书剑子), who stated:

"...because of our nation's particular brand of education, our children are fed 20 years of Marxist philosophy with Chinese characteristics—a philosophy that has nothing to say about saving lives...School construction is the worst. First, there's not enough capital. Schools in poor areas have small budgets and, unlike schools in the cities, they can't collect huge fees, so they're pressed for money. With construction, add in exploitation by government officials, education officials, school managers, etc. and you can imagine what's left over for the actual building of schools. When earthquake prevention standards are raised, government departments, major businesses, etc. will all appraise and reinforce their buildings. But these schools with their 70s-era buildings, no-one pays attention to them. Because of this, the older school buildings suffer from inadequate protection while the new buildings have been shoddily constructed."

On Children's Day, June 1, 2008, many parents went to the rubble of schools to mourn for their children. The surviving children, who were mostly living in relief centers, performed ceremonies marking the special day, but also acknowledging the earthquake.

Ye Zhiping, the principal of Sangzao Middle School in Sangzao, one of the largest in An County, has been credited with proactive action that spared the lives of all 2,323 pupils in attendance when the earthquake happened. During a three-year period that ended in 2007, he oversaw a major overhaul of his school. During that time he obtained more than 400,000 yuan (US$60,000) from the county education department, money used to widen and strengthen concrete pillars and the balcony railing of all four storeys of his school, as well as secure its concrete floors.

The AP reported that "The state-controlled media has largely ignored the issue, apparently under the propaganda bureau's instructions. Parents and volunteers who have questioned authorities have been detained and threatened."

Reuters reported in June that, to date, Chinese prosecutors have joined an official inquiry into ten collapsed schools during May's devastating earthquake to gain first-hand material of construction quality at the collapsed schools, launch preliminary inquiries and prepare for possible investigations into professional crime. It was also reported that safety checks were to be carried out at schools across China after last month's earthquake. However, results from this inquiry have not been published.

The New York Times reported that "government officials in Beijing and Sichuan have said they are investigating the collapses. In response to the weakness of building codes in the countryside, the National Development and Reform Commission said on May 27 that it had drafted an amendment to improve construction standards for primary and middle schools in rural areas. Experts are reviewing the draft, the commission said." To limit protests, officials pushed parents to sign a document, which forbade them from holding protests, in exchange of money, but some who refused to sign were threatened. The payment amounts varied from school to school but were approximately the same. In Hanwang, parents were offered a package valued at US$8,800 in cash and a per-parent pension of nearly US$5,600. Furthermore, officials used other methods of silencing: riot police officers broke up protests by parents; the authorities set up cordons around the schools; and officials ordered the Chinese news media to stop reporting on school collapses.

Besides parents, Liu Shaokun (刘绍坤), a Sichuan school teacher, was detained on June 25, 2008, for "disseminating rumors and destroying social order" about the Sichuan earthquake. Liu's family was later told that he was being investigated on suspicion of the crime of "inciting a disturbance". Liu had travelled to the Shifang, taken photos of collapsed school buildings, and put them online. He had also expressed his anger at "the shoddy tofu-dregs buildings" (豆腐渣工程) in a media interview. Liu was initially sentenced to one year of re-education through labor. However, Liu successfully appealed this decision and was allowed to return home and his belongings were returned.

In January 2010, Hong Kong-based English newspaper The Standard reported that writer Tan Zuoren attempted to document shoddy construction that may have led to massive casualties in schools, was sentenced to in prison ostensibly for his writing an article in 2007 in support of the pro-democracy movement in 1989.

== Foreign and domestic aid ==
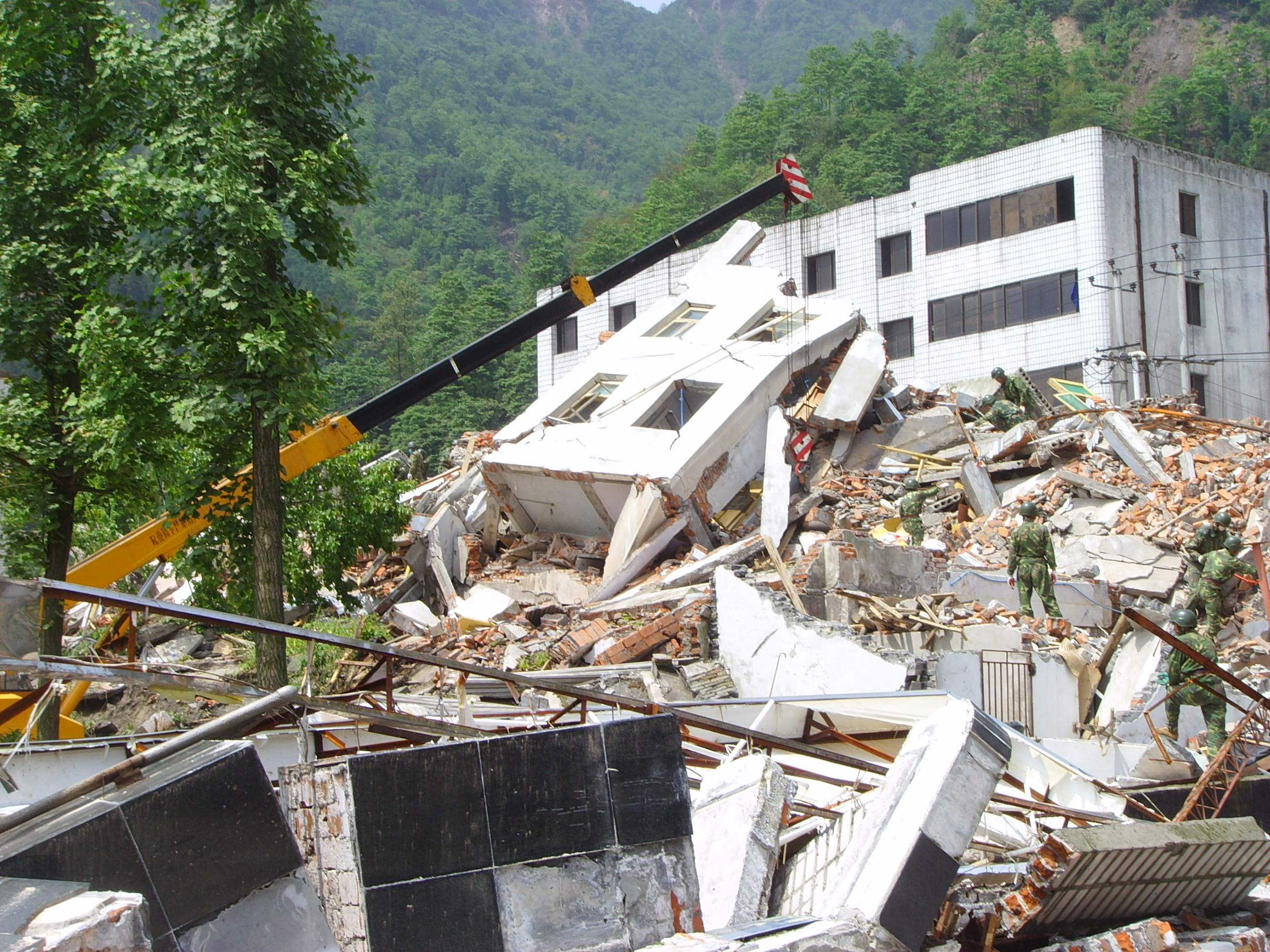
South Korean dispatch of the Central 119 Rescue Team to Sichuan following the earthquake

Because of the magnitude of the quake, and the media attention on China, foreign nations and organizations immediately responded to the disaster by offering condolences and assistance. On May 14, UNICEF reported that China formally requested the support of the international community to respond to the needs of affected families.

=== China ===
By May 14, the Ministry of Civil Affairs stated that 10.7 billion yuan (approximately US$1.5 billion) had been donated by the Chinese public. Houston Rockets center Yao Ming, one of the country's most popular sports icons, gave $214,000 and $71,000 to the Red Cross Society of China. The association has also collected a total of $26 million in donations. Other multinational firms located in China have also announced large amounts of donations.

The Red Cross Society of China flew 557 tents and 2,500 quilts valued at 788,000 yuan (US$113,000) to Wenchuan County. The Amity Foundation already began relief work in the region and has earmarked US$143,000 for disaster relief. The Sichuan Ministry of Civil Affairs said that they have provided 30,000 tents for those left homeless.

Central State-owned enterprises have accumulatively donated more than $48.6 million. China National Petroleum Corp and Sinopec donated 10 million yuan each to the disaster area.

Following the earthquake, donations were made by people from all over China, with booths set up in schools, at banks, and around gas stations. People also donated blood, resulting in according to Xinhua long line-ups in most major Chinese cities. Many donated through text messaging on mobile phones to accounts set up by China Unicom and China Mobile By May 16, the Chinese government had allocated a total of $772 million for earthquake relief so far, up sharply from $159 million from May 14.

On May 16 China stated it had also received $457 million in donated money and goods for rescue efforts so far, including $83 million from 19 countries and four international organizations. Saudi Arabia was the largest aid donor to China, providing close to €40,000,000 in financial assistance, and an additional €8,000,000 worth of relief materials.

A total of 45.5 million members of the Chinese Communist Party contributed financially to the special fund for relief, donating a total of around US$1.37 billion.

==== Saudi Arabia ====
Saudi Arabia was one of the largest foreign donors in response to the 2008 Sichuan (Wenchuan) earthquake. King Abdullah bin Abdul-Aziz offered US$50 million in cash and US$10 million in relief materials. The relief materials included tents, blankets, instant food, milk powder, and rescue tools. Saudi Arabia also pledged further supplies, including approximately 85,000 tents, 400,000 awnings, and 500,000 blankets.

To support displaced families, Saudi Arabia established a sheltering center in Mima Netso, Sichuan (covering about 30,000 m^{2}), capable of sheltering over 15,000 families with more than 11,300 tents, and including health clinic facilities. Employees of both governments coordinated on airlifting and distribution of aid.

Chinese government officials publicly thanked Saudi Arabia, noting the assistance reflected strong bilateral friendship.

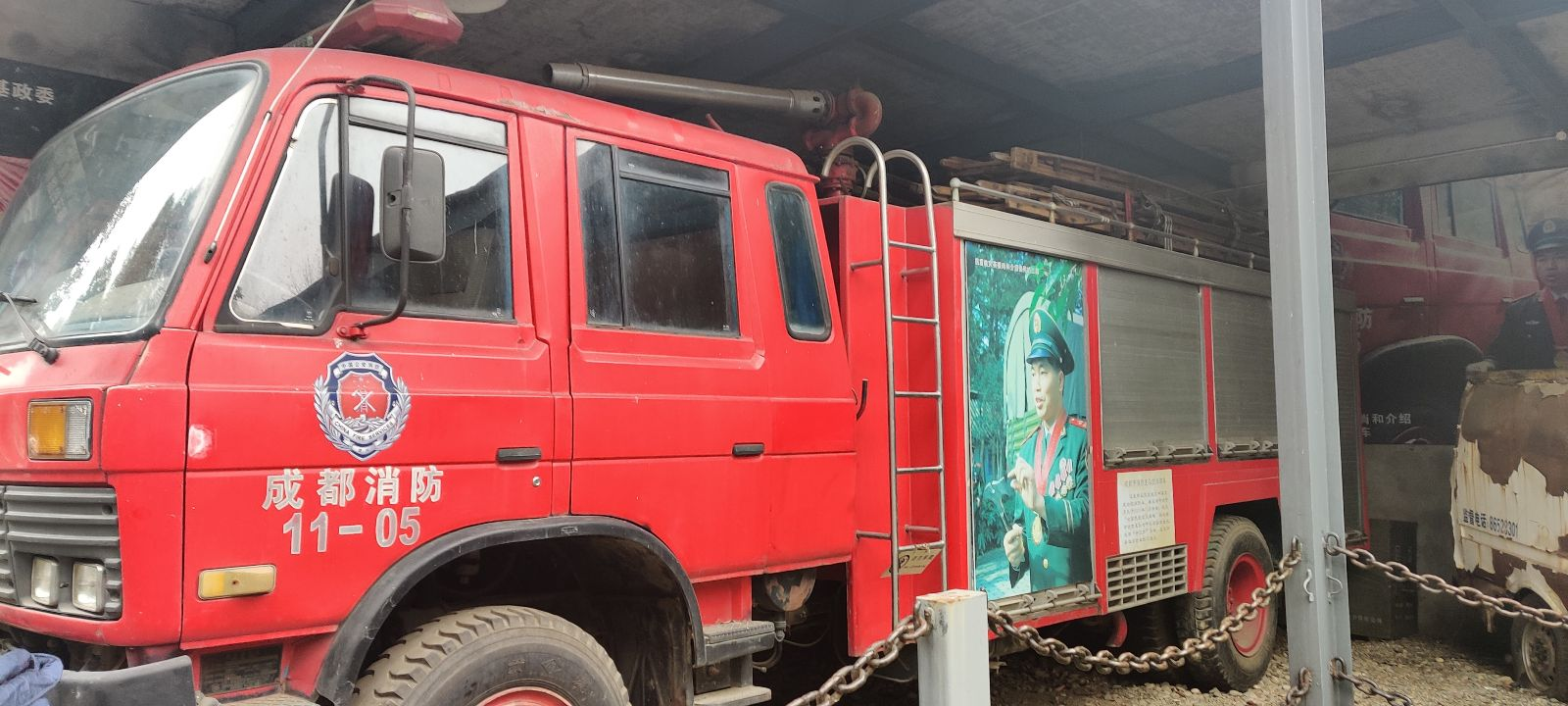
A retired China Fire Services Chengdu department fire truck which responded to the 2008 earthquake in the Jianchuan Museum Cluster 2008 Earthquake exhibit.

== Memorialization ==
On May 12, 2009, China marked the first anniversary of the quake with a moment of silence as people across the nation remembered the dead. The government also opened access to the sealed ruins of the Beichuan County seat for three days, after which it would be frozen in time as a state earthquake relic museum in remembrance of the disaster.

The Wenchuan Earthquake Memorial is located at the ancient town of Anren in Dayi County, the former site of Beichuan Middle School.

== Reconstruction efforts ==
In 2012, vice governor Wei Hong announced that government restoration and reconstruction were complete:

Wei said that 99.5 percent of the budget, or 865.8 billion yuan (137.5 billion U.S. dollars), has been invested in post-quake reconstruction efforts, and 99 percent of 29,692 related projects have been completed. . . . Local governments have successfully helped more than 12 million people in rural and urban areas repair their houses, and have relocated 200,000 farmers who lost their farmlands, the vice governor added.

Regarding the response to the earthquake at large, a World Bank report noted the speed and scale of China's response:

"One of the most astonishing aspects is the speed and efficiency with which the Chinese government was able to mobilize government agencies, the private sector and the population at large...Overall, about 41,130 projects for reconstruction and rehabilitation were undertaken, 99% of which were completed within a two year period."

== Precursors and postmortems ==
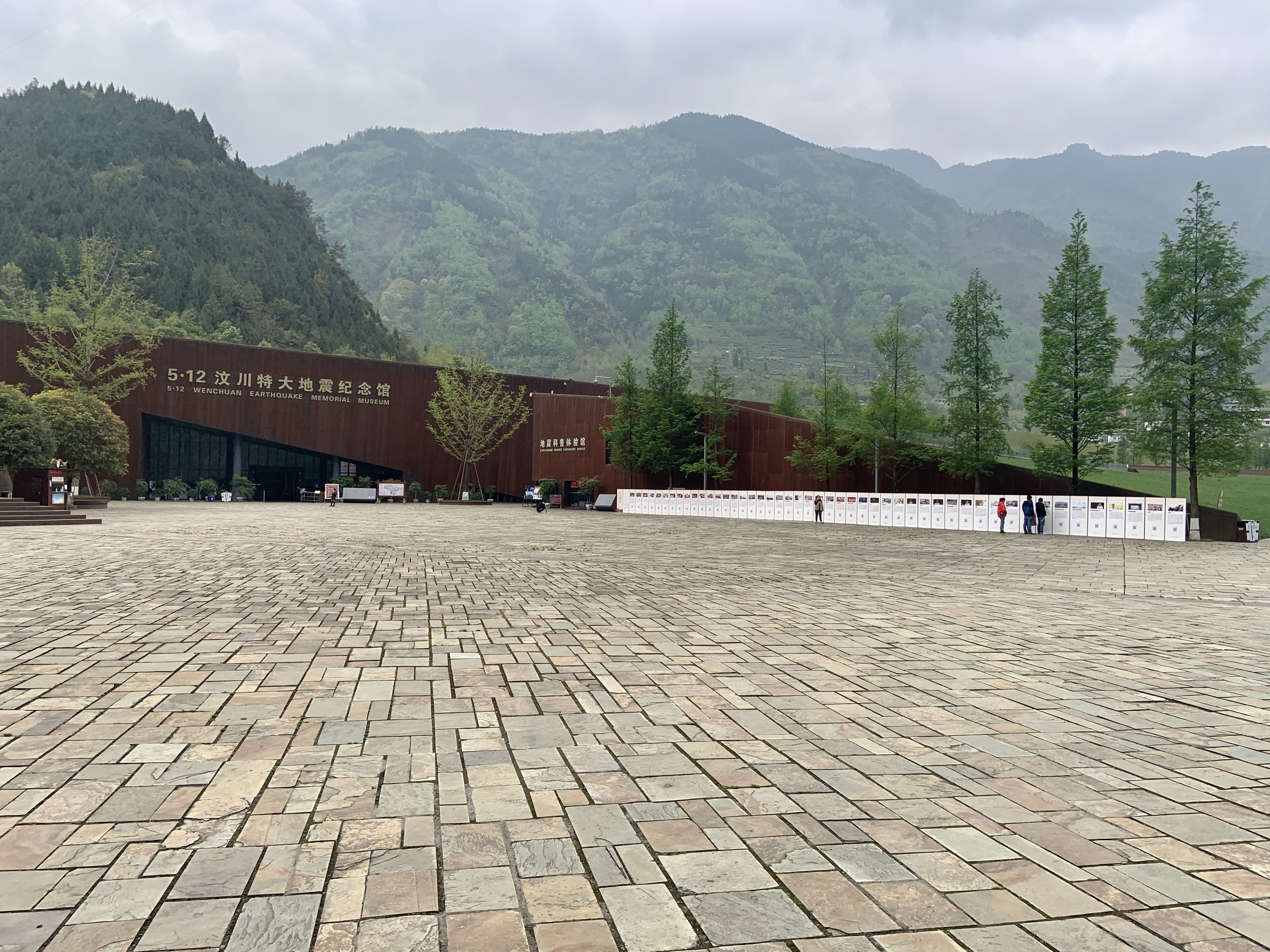
Wenchuan Earthquake Memorial Museum

The earthquake was the worst to strike the Sichuan area in over 30 years. Following the quake, experts and the general public sought information on whether or not the earthquake could have been predicted, and whether or not studying statistics related to the quake could result in better prediction of earthquakes in the future. Earthquake prediction is not yet established science; there was no consensus within the scientific community that earthquake "prediction" is possible.

In 2002, Chinese geologist Chen Xuezhong published a Seismic Risk Analysis study in which he came to the conclusion that beginning with 2003, attention should be paid to the possibility of an earthquake with a magnitude of over 7.0 occurring in Sichuan region. He based his study on statistical correlation. That Sichuan is a seismically active area has been discussed for years prior to the quake, though few studies point to a specific date and time.

In a press conference held by the State Council Information Office the day after the earthquake, geologist Zhang Xiaodong, deputy director of CEA's Seismic Monitoring Network Center, restated that earthquake prediction was a global issue, in the sense that no proven methods exist, and that no prediction notification was received before the earthquake. Seismologist Gary Gibson of Monash University in Australia told Deutsche Presse-Agentur that he also did not see anything that could be regarded as having 'predicted' the earthquake's occurrence.

The earthquake also provided opportunities for researchers to retrofit data in order to model future earthquake predictions. Using data from the Intermagnet Lanzhou geomagnetic observatory, geologists Lazo Pekevski from the Ss. Cyril and Methodius University of Skopje in North Macedonia and Strachimir Mavrodiev from the Bulgarian Academy of Sciences attempted to establish a "time prediction method" through collecting statistics on geomagnetism with tidal gravitational potential. Using this method, they were said to have predicted the time of the 2008 Sichuan earthquake with an accuracy of ±1 day. The same study, however, acknowledges the limitation of earthquake prediction models, and does not mention that the location of the quake could be accurately predicted.

An article in Science suggested that the construction and filling of the Zipingpu Dam may have triggered the earthquake. The chief engineer of the Sichuan Geology and Mineral Bureau said that the sudden shift of a huge quantity of water into the region could have relaxed the tension between the two sides of the fault, allowing them to move apart, and could have increased the direct pressure on it, causing a violent rupture. The effect was "25 times more" than a year's worth of natural stress from tectonic movement. The government had disregarded warnings about so many large-scale dam projects in a seismically active area. Researchers have been denied access to seismological and geological data to examine the cause of the quake further.

Malaysia-based Yazhou Zhoukan conducted an interview with former researcher at the China Seismological Bureau Geng Qingguo (耿庆国), in which Geng claimed that a confidential written report was sent to the State Seismological Bureau on April 30, 2008, warning about the possible occurrence of a significant earthquake in Ngawa Prefecture region of Sichuan around May 8, with a range of 10 days before or after the quake. Geng, while acknowledging that earthquake prediction was broadly considered problematic by the scientific community, believed that "the bigger the earthquake, the easier it is to predict." Geng had long attempted to establish a correlation between the occurrence of droughts and earthquakes; Premier Zhou Enlai reportedly took an interest in Geng's work. Geng's drought-earthquake correlation theory was first released in 1972, and said to have predicted the 1975 Haicheng and 1976 Tangshan earthquakes. The same Yazhou Zhoukan article pointed out the inherent difficulties associated with predicting earthquakes. In response, an official with the Seismological Bureau stated that "earthquake prediction is widely acknowledged around the world to be difficult from a scientific standpoint." The official also denied that the Seismological Bureau had received reports predicting the earthquake.

== See also ==
- List of deadly earthquakes since 1900
- List of earthquakes in 2008
- List of earthquakes in China
- List of earthquakes in Sichuan
- List of natural disasters by death toll
- Lists of earthquakes
- Natural disasters in China
