= Ye Zhiping =

Chinese academic

Ye Zhiping (1953 – June 27, 2011) was the principal of Sangzao Middle School in An County, Sichuan, People's Republic of China, noteworthy for saving thousands of his students.

Concerned over the structural integrity of school buildings, especially when facing an earthquake, he undertook special measures, collecting funds to strengthen existing structures. As a result, during the 2008 Sichuan earthquake all 2,323 students emerged unharmed. This was in stark contrast to many other school buildings, which took disproportionate damage compared to other buildings, leading to heavy criticism of government standards for educational facilities, and even allegations of corruption in the construction of Chinese schools.

He died in Chengdu on 27 June 2011 aged 57 after suffering a cerebral haemorrhage.
