= Juyuan High School =

Chinese secondary school

Dujiangyan August 1 Juyuan High School (simplified Chinese: 都江堰市八一聚源高级中学; traditional Chinese: 都江堰市八一聚源高級中學; pinyin: Dūjiāngyànshì Bāyī Jùyuán Gāojízhōngxué, BYJYGZ) is a secondary school located in Dujiangyan City, Chengdu, Sichuan.

Prior to the 2008 Sichuan earthquake, 2,800 students attended the school. Due to the earthquake, 278 students died and 11 went missing and were never found. For a period, the students attended school in makeshift classrooms. In August 2009 the new Juyuan High School opened. 133 million yuan (US$19.48 million) of funds from the Chengdu Military Region were used to rebuild the school. It was additionally funded by organizations across China.

== Campus ==
The school has 35,000 square feet (3,300 m^{2}) of space and has a capacity for 2,400 students, serving Juyuan County and surrounding areas. It houses classrooms, an indoor gymnasium, a football (soccer field), and office space. China.org.cn stated that the buildings were built to withstand an 8.5 magnitude earthquake.

== Programs ==
The school is in a partnership with the Chengdu Military Region. Students may join the army when they graduate or they may attend university.
