= Strong-Willed Pig =

Pig who survived an earthquake (2007-2021)

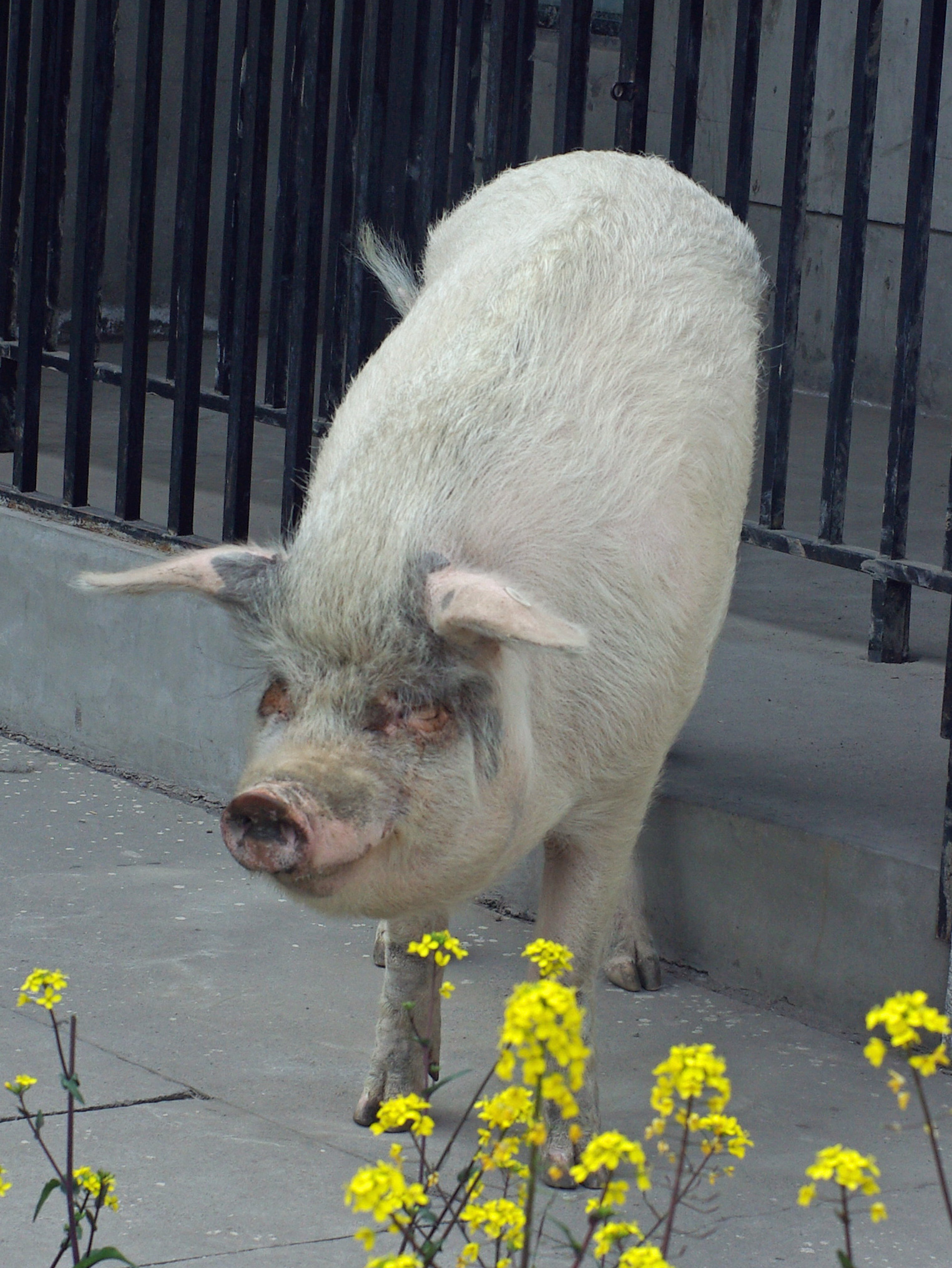
- Nine months after its ordeal
- Born: April 2007; Tuanshan Village, Longmenshan Town, Pengzhou City, Chengdu City
- Died: June 16, 2021 (aged 14); Jianchuan Museum Cluster, Anren Town, Dayi County, Chengdu City
- Cause of death: Old age & exhaustion
- Known for: Survived being buried for 36 days after the Wenchuan earthquake

The Strong-Willed Pig (Chinese: 猪坚强; pinyin: Zhu Jianqiang; April 2007 – June 16, 2021), was a pig originally belonging to Wan Xingming, a villager in Tuanshan Village, Longmenshan Town, Pengzhou City, Chengdu City. On May 12, 2008, the Wenchuan earthquake occurred and the pig was buried under rubble for 36 days but amazingly survived on just charcoal and rainwater. On June 17, 2008, the pig was rescued and its weight was found to have dropped from 150 kg to 50 kg. The pig became a symbol of hope, fortitude and resilience. He was "revered for his heroism".

== Biography ==
After the Wenchuan earthquake, Jianchuan Museum adopted the pig, and the curator, Fan Jianchuan, gave it two names: the nickname "36 Wa'er" and the formal name "Strong-Willed Pig". In September 2011, Chinese scientists cloned the Strong-Willed Pig.

On May 1, 2021, Fan Jianchuan stated that "the situation of Strong-Willed Pig is terrible". On the 10th, the Jianchuan Museum said that the pig had entered the final stage of its life. On June 16, 2021, Strong-Willed Pig died at Jianchuan Museum Cluster at the age of 14 due to old age and exhaustion. On Weibo there were 430 million views of the hashtag "Strong-Willed Pig has died".
