= Wenchuan Earthquake Memorial =

Memorial site in Sichuan, China

The Wenchuan Earthquake Memorial (Chinese: 5.12汶川特大地震纪念馆; pinyin: 5.12 Wènchuān tèdà dìzhèn jìniànguǎn) is a memorial site located in the ancient town of Anren in Dayi County, Sichuan, China. It is dedicated to the victims of the 2008 Sichuan earthquake, which killed at least 69,227 people. The memorial is built on the site of the Beichuan Middle School, which collapsed during the earthquake, killing more than 1,000 pupils and teachers inside.

== History ==
Designed by Atelier Li Xinggang, it is one of the single buildings among the non-governmental funded Jianchuan Museum Cluster. The museum was originally designed to collect and exhibit mirrors from the Cultural Revolution of China. Following the earthquake, it was redesigned into a composite museum, in which relics and related artworks are on display.
