= Anzhou, Mianyang =

Anzhou 安州区
- District
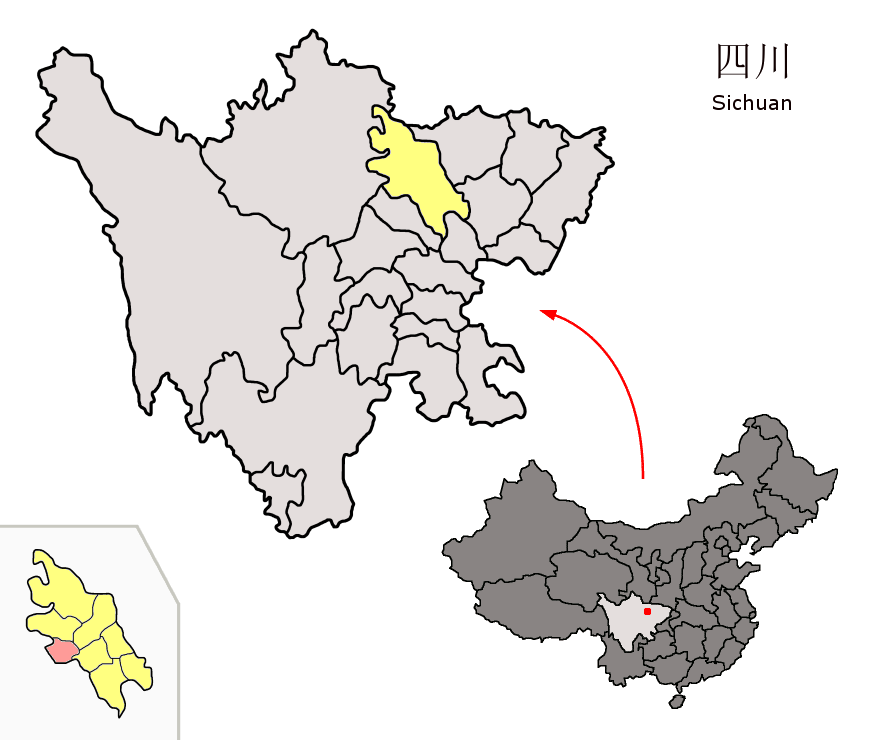
- Location of Anzhou District (red) within Mianyang City (yellow) and Sichuan
- Coordinates: 31°32′06″N 104°34′02″E
- Country: China
- Province: Sichuan
- Prefecture-level city: Mianyang
- District seat: Huagai

Area
  - Total: 1,404 km^{2} (542 sq mi)
- Elevation: 509 m (1,670 ft)

Population (2020)
  - Total: 372,962
  - Density: 265.6/km^{2} (688.0/sq mi)
- Time zone: UTC+8 (China Standard)
- Postal code: 622650
- Area code: 0816
- Website: http://anxian.my.gov.cn

Anzhou District (simplified Chinese: 安州区; traditional Chinese: 安州區; pinyin: Ānzhōu Qū) formerly An County is a district of the city of Mianyang, in northeastern Sichuan province, China.

It has an area of 1,184 square kilometres (457 sq mi) and a population of 372,962 in 2020.

== Administrative divisions ==
Anzhou has 9 towns and 1 township.

Towns

- Huagai (花荄镇)
- Sangzao (桑枣镇)
- Huangtu (黄土镇)
- Tashui (塔水镇)
- Xiushui (秀水镇)
- Heqing (河清镇)
- Jiepai (界牌镇)
- Jushui (睢水镇)
- Qianfo (千佛镇)

Township

- Gaochuan (高川乡)

== Climate ==
Climate data for Anzhou, elevation 519 m (1,703 ft), (1991–2020 normals, extremes 1991–present)
Month	Jan	Feb	Mar	Apr	May	Jun	Jul	Aug	Sep	Oct	Nov	Dec	Year
Record high °C (°F)	19.3 (66.7)	22.5 (72.5)	31.6 (88.9)	33.2 (91.8)	36.1 (97.0)	38.7 (101.7)	37.4 (99.3)	37.4 (99.3)	35.2 (95.4)	31.6 (88.9)	25.6 (78.1)	20.3 (68.5)	38.7 (101.7)
Mean daily maximum °C (°F)	9.2 (48.6)	11.9 (53.4)	16.6 (61.9)	22.5 (72.5)	26.4 (79.5)	28.6 (83.5)	30.3 (86.5)	30.1 (86.2)	25.4 (77.7)	20.5 (68.9)	15.8 (60.4)	10.5 (50.9)	20.7 (69.2)
Daily mean °C (°F)	5.5 (41.9)	8.0 (46.4)	12.1 (53.8)	17.5 (63.5)	21.5 (70.7)	24.1 (75.4)	25.9 (78.6)	25.5 (77.9)	21.6 (70.9)	17.0 (62.6)	12.3 (54.1)	6.9 (44.4)	16.5 (61.7)
Mean daily minimum °C (°F)	2.7 (36.9)	5.1 (41.2)	8.8 (47.8)	13.6 (56.5)	17.6 (63.7)	20.6 (69.1)	22.6 (72.7)	22.2 (72.0)	19.1 (66.4)	14.8 (58.6)	9.8 (49.6)	4.2 (39.6)	13.4 (56.2)
Record low °C (°F)	−6.9 (19.6)	−3.2 (26.2)	0.6 (33.1)	4.2 (39.6)	8.5 (47.3)	14.2 (57.6)	18.0 (64.4)	16.3 (61.3)	11.1 (52.0)	6.4 (43.5)	0.5 (32.9)	−6.5 (20.3)	−6.9 (19.6)
Average precipitation mm (inches)	10.5 (0.41)	13.3 (0.52)	26.6 (1.05)	50.4 (1.98)	79.9 (3.15)	114.4 (4.50)	279.4 (11.00)	275.1 (10.83)	158.4 (6.24)	53.9 (2.12)	20.5 (0.81)	6.8 (0.27)	1,089.2 (42.88)
Average precipitation days (≥ 0.1 mm)	7.9	8.1	11.6	12.7	14.1	15.0	16.9	16.0	16.8	15.9	8.7	6.2	149.9
Average snowy days	1.6	0.6	0.1	0	0	0	0	0	0	0	0	0.4	2.7
Average relative humidity (%)	77	74	72	70	67	74	78	78	81	81	79	78	76
Mean monthly sunshine hours	62.3	55.8	79.2	109.1	119.2	103.7	120.9	131.4	61.3	52.0	61.4	64.6	1,020.9
Percentage possible sunshine	19	18	21	28	28	25	28	32	17	15	20	21	23
Source: China Meteorological Administration all-time January high
