= Auspicious Tantra of All-Reaching Union =

Chinese Buddhist printed texts

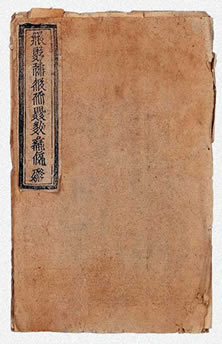
Front cover of Auspicious Tantra of All-Reaching Union: Supplementary Explanations volume 5

The Auspicious Tantra of All-Reaching Union (Tangut: 𘀄𘓄𗄊𗫡𗋈𘜼𗰜𗺓 Gyu̱²-rjur¹ Źji²-njɨ² Ngwu²-phjo̱² Mər²-twẹ², (Note: The Tangut readings are taken from Li Fanwen's Tangut-Chinese Dictionary (Beijing: China Academy of Social Sciences Press, 2008), where they are character numbers 4031, 4437, 0010, 2679, 3055, 1223, 0856, and 3756.) translated into Chinese as Jíxiáng Biànzhì Kǒuhé Běnxù 吉祥遍至口合本續 or 吉祥遍至口和本續 (Note: The Chinese translation of the Tangut title of the book has been retranslated into English as Lucky spreading sutra continuation and Continuation for Propitiousness Everywhere Reading Edition, but the word "Continuation" is a misinterpretation of the Chinese word běnxù (本續) that here means "Tantra".)) is the title of a set of nine volumes of Buddhist printed texts written in the Tangut language and script which was discovered in the ruins of the Baisigou Square Pagoda in Helan County, Ningxia, Northwest China in 1991 after it had been illegally blown up.

Printed during the Western Xia (1038–1227), circa 1139–1193, it is thought to be the earliest extant example of a book printed using wooden movable type. The book is currently held at the Ningxia Institute of Archaeology in Yinchuan, and because of its historical significance it has been included in the list of 64 Chinese cultural relics forbidden to be exhibited abroad that was issued by the State Administration of Cultural Heritage in 2002.

== Discovery ==
The Baisigou Square Pagoda was situated in a remote location in the Helan Mountains, about 10 km from the nearest road. On 28 November 1990 a local peasant discovered that the pagoda had collapsed in ruins; subsequent investigation revealed it had been blown up by unknown criminals, apparently with the intention of stealing any historical relics inside the pagoda. In August of the following year an expedition led by archaeologist Niu Dasheng (牛達生) (b. 1933) from Ningxia Museum carried out archaeological investigations at the site.

The archaeologists uncovered a large number of artefacts, concentrated in a small area in the middle of the collapsed pagoda, under about a metre of rubble, which they determined must have come from chambers in the tenth and twelfth stories of the otherwise solid pagoda. The artefacts comprised coins, silk cloth, woodblock prints of Buddhist images, miniature moulded clay sculptures of stupas and Buddhas, wooden tablets inscribed in ink with Tangut characters, a handwritten scroll 5.74 m in length written in cursive Tangut characters, and more than thirty volumes of printed books and manuscripts in both Chinese and Tangut, including the nine volumes of the Auspicious Tantra of All-Reaching Union.

== Description ==
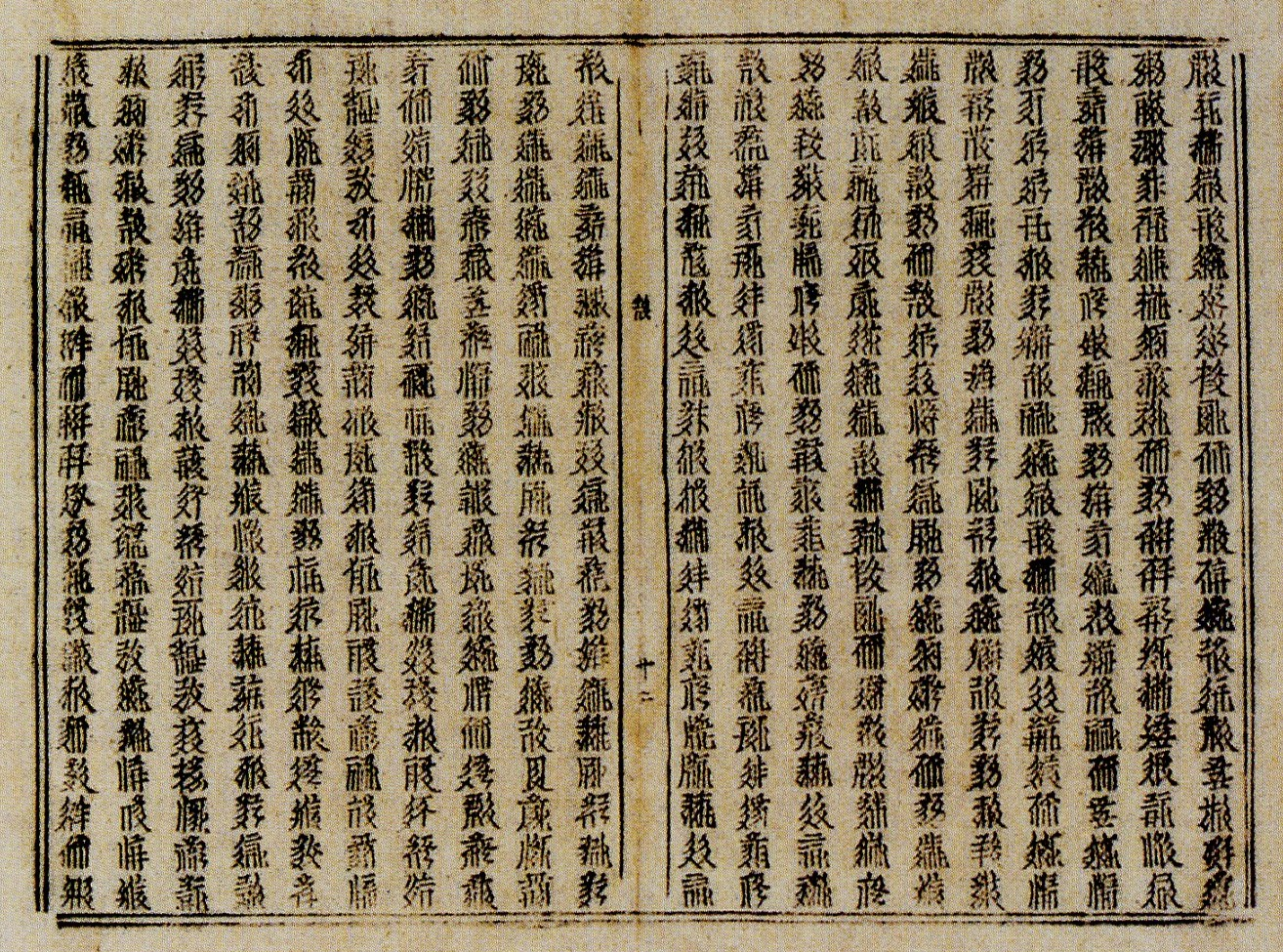
An open folio from the Auspicious Tantra of All-Reaching Union, showing gaps in the perimeter lines at the corners that are typical of movable type printing.

The Auspicious Tantra of All-Reaching Union found in the ruins of the pagoda is incomplete, comprising three complete volumes from the main text, and four complete and two partial volumes from supplementary parts of the book:

- Auspicious Tantra of All-Reaching Union (3 vols.): volumes 3, 4 and 5 (out of 5 volumes in total);
- Auspicious Tantra of All-Reaching Union: Essential Text (1 vol.);
- Auspicious Tantra of All-Reaching Union: Broad Meaning Part B (1 vol.);
- Auspicious Tantra of All-Reaching Union: Supplementary Explanations (4 vols.): volumes 1, 2, 3 and 5 (vols. 2 and 3 only partially preserved).

The book is printed on paper, and the paper for the main body of text is made from ramie and hemp fibres.

The volumes were bound using the "butterfly binding" method whereby each sheet was folded in half inwards and pasted together at the fold (the opposite of traditional stitch binding where the sheets are folded in half outwards and stitched together at the opposite end of the fold). When opened up, the dimensions of the print area of each folio are 30.7 mm × 38.0 mm. The book title and page number are printed on the central fold of each folio, with the page numbers written in either Tangut or Chinese or a mixture of Tangut and Chinese. Each half-folio comprises ten vertical lines of 22 Tangut characters.

== Printing ==
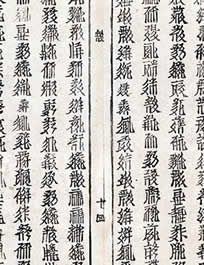
Detail of a page from the Auspicious Tantra of All-Reaching Union showing an inverted Chinese characters 十四 "fourteen" in the centre fold.

There are a number of characteristic features of the book indicating that it was printed using movable type, such as the gaps between the perimeter lines at the corners, and between the centre fold lines and the top and bottom perimeter lines, this being due to the print frame being made of loose pieces of wood rather being carved from a single block of wood as is the case with woodblock printing. Even more tellingly, characters are sometimes inverted, which is typical of books printed with movable type, but cannot accidentally occur in woodblock editions. That it was printed using wooden type rather than clay type is indicated by the occasional presence of uneven lines between the columns of characters, which were left by bamboo strips used to set the wooden type (but which were not used for setting clay type).

This is not the only Tangut book thought to have been printed using wooden movable type, and there is supporting evidence for the use of movable type printing during the Western Xia in some other Tangut books. For example, in the colophon at the end of the Tangut translation of the Flower Garland Sutra there are references to printing using "loose characters", and to the printer "selecting characters". Furthermore, on the credits to a Buddhist sutra dated 1216 it is stated that it was printed by an "Office of Movable Printing". Nevertheless, it is thought that the Auspicious Tantra of All-Reaching Union is earlier in date than any of the other surviving Tangut books that may have been printed using movable type. The book itself does not provide a date of publication, but on the basis of dated books (latest book dated 1180) and other dateable artefacts found together with the Auspicious Tantra of All-Reaching Union in the ruins of the Baisigou Square Pagoda, the book is believed to have been printed sometime during the reign of Emperor Renzong of Western Xia (1139–1193). It is considered by many Chinese experts to be the earliest extant example of a book printed using wooden movable type anywhere in the world.

== Textual transmission ==
The Auspicious Tantra of All-Reaching Union is a unique copy of an otherwise unknown Tangut translation of a Tantric Buddhist text, comprising the main text of the Tantra in five volumes, together with several volumes of commentaries and other supplementary material. The start of each volume of the main text credits the original translation of the text from Sanskrit into Tibetan to the Indian paṇḍita Gayadhara (d. 1103) and the Tibetan translator 'Gos Khug-pa Lhas-btsas, and the subsequent retranslation from Tibetan to Tangut to a Tangut monk called Piputifu (Chinese 毗菩提福). (Note: This is not his original Tangut name, but the pinyin transliteration of the modern translation of his name into Mandarin by Sun Changsheng. The first three Chinese characters (毗菩提) are phonetic transcriptions of the corresponding Tangut characters, whereas the last Chinese character (福, meaning "good fortune") is a translation of the meaning of the corresponding Tangut character.) Thus, the Tangut text is believed to be a retranslation from Tibetan of an original translation of a Sanskrit text.

Tangut scholars originally did not know which Tibetan text the book was translated from, and thought that it was probably an unknown lost text. However, Tibetologist Shen Weirong has suggested that the Tangut title of the book is a translation of the Tibetan dpal kun-tu kha-sbyor zhes-bya ba'i rgyud དཔལ་ཀུན་ཏུ་ཁ་སྦྱོར་ཞེས་བྱ་བའི་རྒྱུད (Glorious Tantra of Everlasting Union (Note: The Tibetan word dpal, translated as "glorious", also means "auspicious"; and the Tibetan word kun-tu, translated as "everlasting", also means "everywhere", so the Tibetan is a close match to the Tangut title.)). Although there is no extant Tibetan text with that title, there is a commentary on a text which includes precisely this title. In the Sanskrit title of this commentary, however, the Sanskrit equivalent of the Tibetan dpal kun-tu kha-sbyor zhes-bya ba'i rgyud is given as Śrī Saṃpuṭa Nāma Tantra, which indicates that the Glorious Tantra of Everlasting Union is a synonym for the Saṃpuṭa Tantra. The Tibetan translation of the Saṃpuṭa Tantra is extant, and is called Yang-dag-par sbyor-ba zhes-bya ba'i rgyud chen-po ཡང་དག་པར་སྦྱོར་བ་ཞེས་བྱ་བའི་རྒྱུད་ཆེན་པོ (Great Tantra of Perfect Union). According to Shen, the contents of part of the fourth volume of the Tangut Auspicious Tantra of All-Reaching Union that were translated into Chinese by Sun Changsheng in 2005 are basically the same as the corresponding section of the Tibetan Great Tantra of Perfect Union.

== See also ==
- List of Tangut books
