= Baisigou Square Pagoda =

Ancient Tangut Buddhist stupa

Coordinates: 38.7°N 105.9°E

Baisigou Square Pagoda before it was destroyed, showing windows to chambers on the 3rd, 10th and 12th stories on the south side of the otherwise solid structure.

Baisigou Square Pagoda (Chinese: 拜寺沟方塔; pinyin: Bàisìgōu Fāngtǎ) was a brick pagoda in Helan County, Ningxia, China, built during the early years of the Western Xia dynasty (1038–1227), circa 1075–1076. It is situated in an isolated location about 10 km into the Baisigou Valley on the eastern side of the Helan Mountains, northwest of Yinchuan, but may have been the site of an important Buddhist temple during the Western Xia. The pagoda was illegally destroyed in 1990; archaeological investigation of the ruins has uncovered a large number of Tangut artefacts and Buddhist relics, including books and manuscripts written in the Tangut language and script.

== Investigation of the ruins of the pagoda ==
On 28 November 1990 a local peasant discovered that the pagoda had suddenly collapsed, and when the Ningxia police investigated they discovered that the pagoda had been blown up by unknown criminals, apparently with the intention of stealing any historical relics inside the pagoda. The pagoda was reduced to rubble, with only a fragment of the northwest corner left intact.

Local archaeologist Niu Dasheng (牛達生) (b. 1933), who worked at the Ningxia Museum, thought that there may be cultural relics at the pagoda, or even an underground chamber like the one found at Famen Temple after its pagoda semi-collapsed in 1981, therefore he organised an expedition to carry out an archaeological investigation of the site and to clear the rubble. In addition to archaeologists, his team included two police officers who were investigating the crime, and twenty or so soldiers from a unit of the People's Liberation Army who were to help move the rubble. In August 1991, after receiving permission from the State Administration of Cultural Heritage, Niu's team headed off to the site of the ruined pagoda, which was several hours from the nearest road, and could only be reached by foot, with donkeys carrying their equipment. The team lived in caves near the pagoda for the duration of the expedition, but there was no source of drinkable water nearby, and so bottled water had to be transported in by donkey.

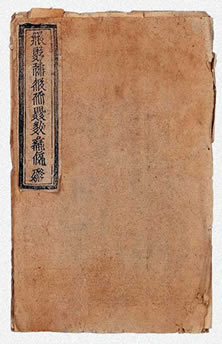
Front cover of a volume of the Auspicious Tantra of All-Reaching Union

On the sixth day the team uncovered a large number of historical artefacts dating to the Western Xia period (1038–1227), including:

- coins;
- wooden knives;
- pieces of silk cloth;
- woodblock Buddhist prints;
- miniature moulded clay sculptures of stupas;
- a bag containing Buddhist relics and fragments of bone;
- miniature moulded clay sculptures of Buddhas (over 5,000 pieces);
- a handwritten scroll 5.74 m in length written in cursive Tangut characters;
- more than thirty printed books and manuscripts in both Chinese and Tangut;
- wooden tablets inscribed in ink with Tangut characters (datable to the period 1102–1114).

These objects were all concentrated in an area about 2 m in diameter, underneath about 1 m of rubble in the centre of the ruins, and were mixed in with earth, branches, bird carcasses and bird skeletons. The archaeologists determined that the artefacts had been housed in chambers occupying the tenth and twelfth stories of the pagoda, and that as these chambers had an opening to the outside on the south side they had thus been used as a roost for birds.

The books and manuscripts comprised both religious texts (Buddhist sutras) and secular texts, including the first known collection of Chinese poetry written by Tangut poets. The most important text discovered was a printed edition in nine volumes of a previously unknown Tangut translation of a Tibetan Tantric Buddhist text and commentaries entitled the Auspicious Tantra of All-Reaching Union, which has been identified as being the earliest known example of a book printed using wooden movable type.

== Construction of the pagoda ==
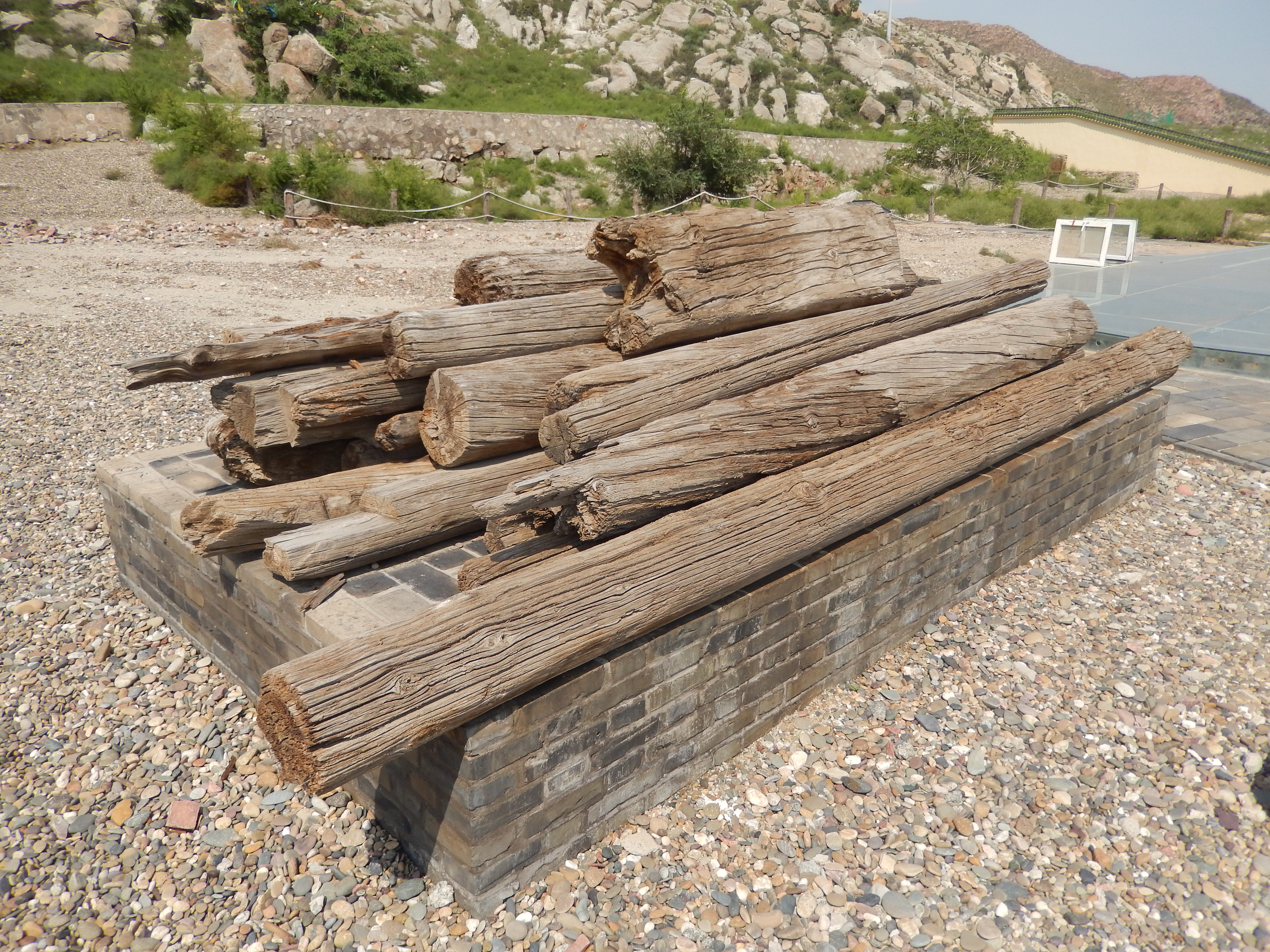
Wooden central supporting pillar (cut into sections) from the Square Pagoda

After excavating the base of the pagoda, archaeologists were able to determine that the pagoda was built during the Western Xia dynasty, during the reign of Emperor Huizong (reigned 1067–1086), not during the Ming dynasty as was previously thought. The primary evidence for the date of construction of the pagoda comes from an ink inscription in Chinese on a section of the central supporting pillar made of pine wood which was discovered in the ruins (there is also an ink inscription in Tangut, but that is largely illegible). The Chinese ink inscription is dated the 5th month of the cyclical year yinmao 寅卯 in the 2nd year of the Da'an era (1076). Yinmao is not a valid cyclical date, and is thought to be a mistake for yimao 乙卯, however yimao corresponds to the first year of the Da'an era (1075). Therefore, it is thought that the pagoda must have been constructed in 1075–1076.

A wooden tablet with ink inscriptions in Tangut on both sides records repairs made to the pagoda during the reign of Emperor Chongzong (reigned 1086–1139) between the 13th and 23rd days of the 5th month of the 13th year of the Zhenguan era, i.e. 27 June to 7 July 1113 in the Julian calendar.

Excavation of the pagoda base indicated that the pagoda was originally thirteen stories in height, not eleven as it had previously appeared to be, as the lowest two stories had been covered up by mudslides over the centuries. There was also no specially built foundation platform underneath the pagoda, as is usually the case, but it was built on a foundation of broken stones. The pagoda was solid inside, with a wooden central supporting pillar that was grounded in a depression 1.4 m in circumference and 2.1 m deep at the bottom of the pagoda. Although the pagoda was solid, there were small, square rooms built into the third, tenth and twelfth stories, with windows on the south side. (Note: The windows on the 3rd, 10th and 12th stories can be seen in photographs of the pagoda before it was destroyed (see for example the picture at the top of this article).) Matching false windows were built into the south side of all the other stories.

Investigation of the surrounding area showed that there was a large Western Xia site to the west of the pagoda, from which archaeologists recovered pieces of tile ends, roof sculptures, and guttering, some of which was glazed in green or blue. As the Laws of the Western Xia specify that red, green and blue glazed tiles are only permitted for use in temples or palaces, these remains are thought to come from a Buddhist temple associated with the pagoda.

Although the pagoda is now in a very isolated location, the mouth of Baisigou Valley is guarded by two Western Xia pagodas, and there are a large number of Western Xia sites with broken pottery, bricks and tiles all along the valley leading up the square pagoda, and so Niu Dasheng has suggested that the temple and pagoda at Baisigou were an important religious site during the Western Xia. The name Baisigou (拜寺沟) means "Valley of the temple" in Chinese. There are no known historical records of the pagoda, but Niu speculates that this was the site of the Temple of Five Platforms Mountain (Wutaishan Si 五台山寺), named after the famous Buddhist mountain, Wutaishan, in Shanxi.

== Gallery of artefacts and texts found at the pagoda ==
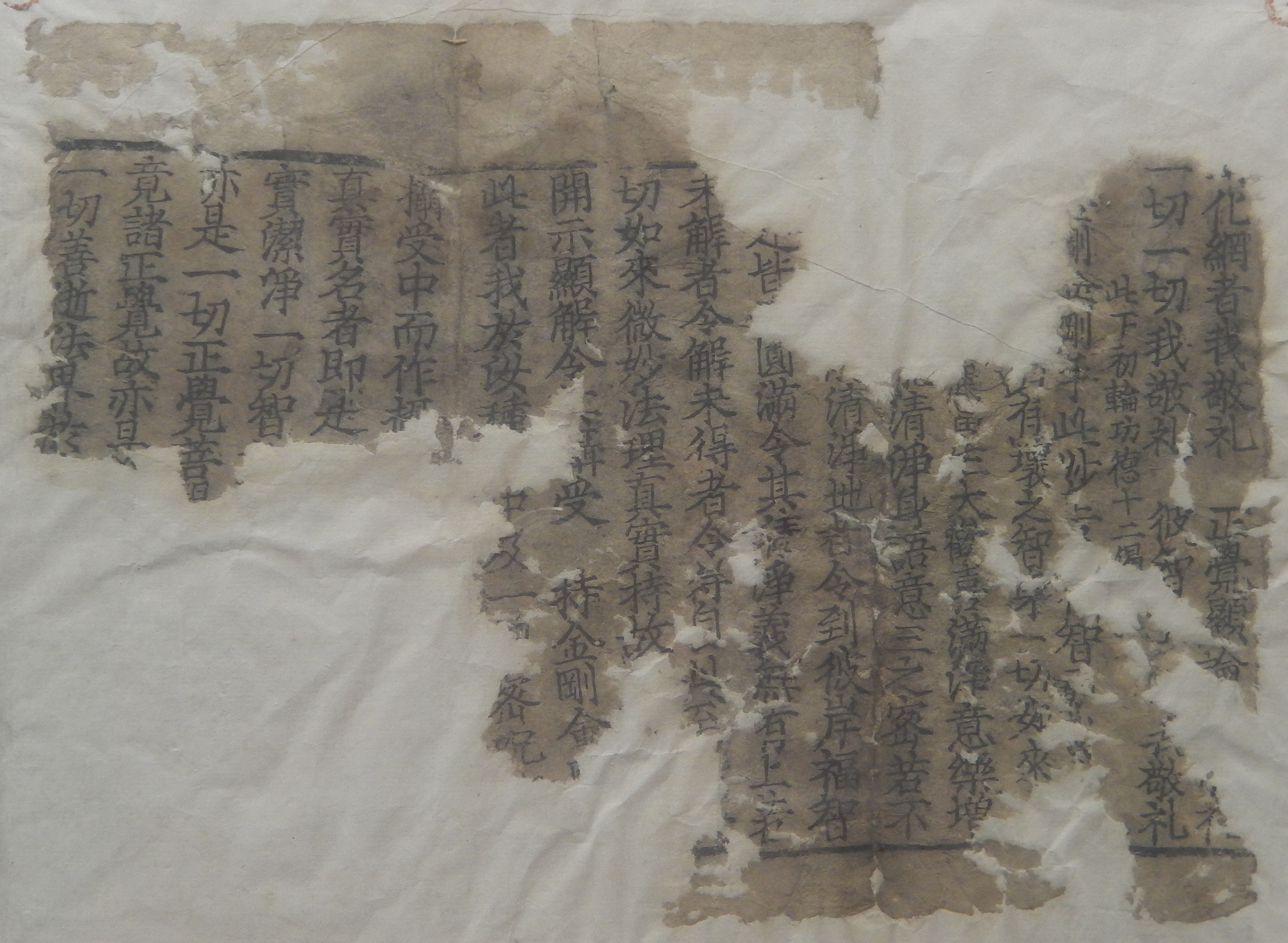
Chinese printed Buddhist sutra

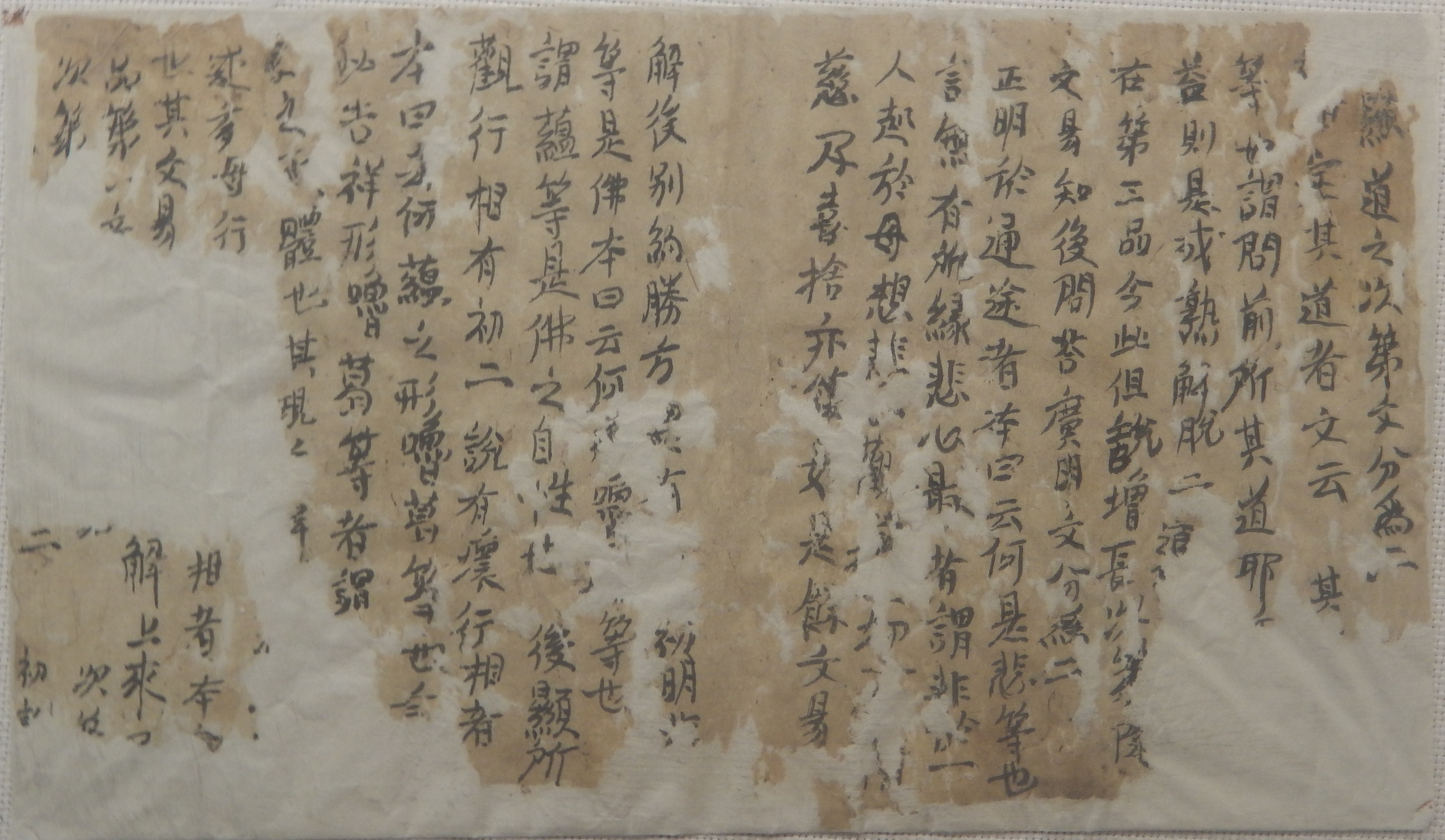
Chinese manuscript Buddhist sutra

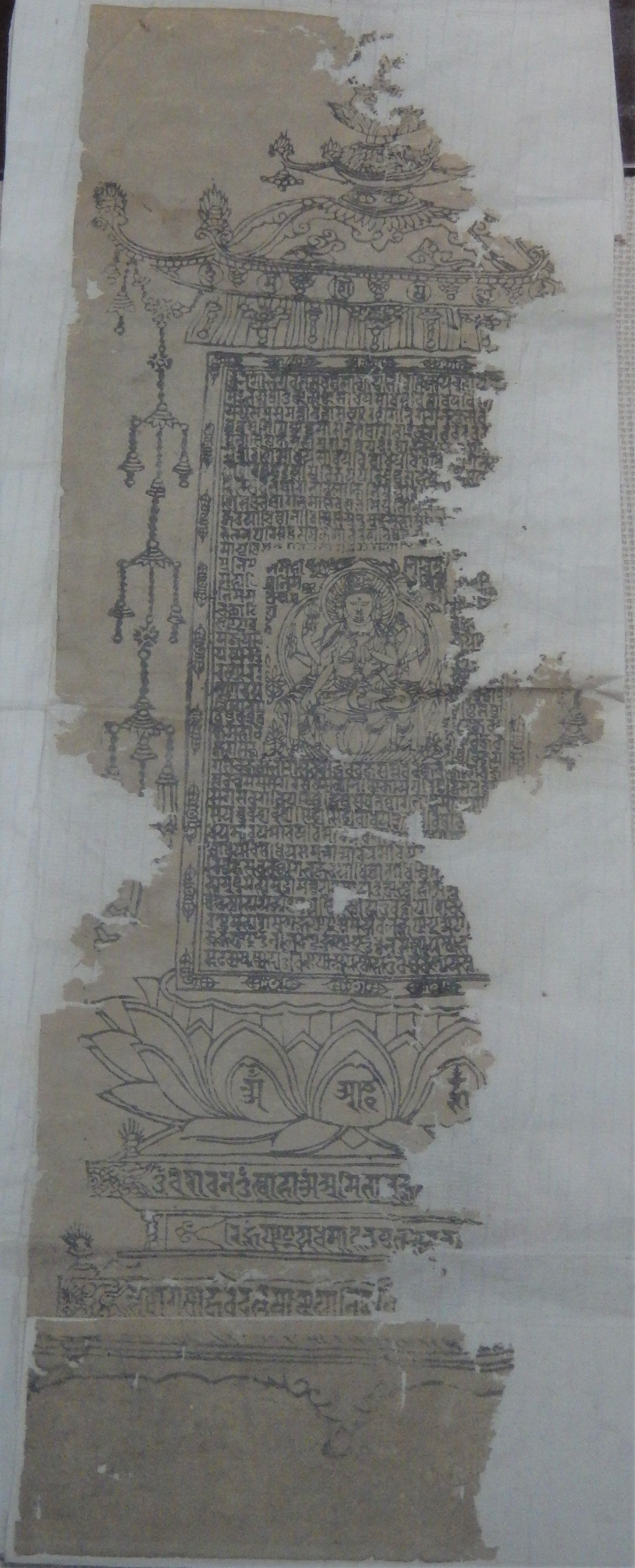
Woodblock print with Sanskrit text

== See also ==
- Twin pagodas of Baisikou
