= Twin pagodas of Baisikou =

Tangut cultural heritage site outside Yinchuan, China

Coordinates: 38.6811°N 105.9635°E

- 拜寺口双塔 (Chinese)
- Major National Historical and Cultural Sites in Ningxia
- Interactive map of Twin pagodas of Baisikou
- Location: Helan, Yinchuan, Ningxia Hui Autonomous Region

History
- Founded: Western Xia

The twin pagodas of Baisikou (Chinese: 拜寺口双塔) are located on a mountain slope plateau of the Helan Mountains within Helan County, Yinchuan City, Ningxia Hui Autonomous Region, People's Republic of China. They stand 100 meters apart from each other. The specific construction date of the two pagodas is not recorded, but based on the surrounding traces of relics and unearthed cultural relics in the pagodas it can be determined that they were built during the Western Xia period. The two pagodas underwent multiple major repairs during the Yuan and Ming dynasties. In 1988, the twin pagodas of Baisikou were designated as a national key cultural relic protection unit.

== History ==
Baisikou (拜寺口, originally written 百寺口, literally: hundred temples mouth [of a gorge]), derived its name from the numerous temples in this area, numbering over 100 at one time. The construction time of the twin pagodas is not explicitly documented, but based on the large number of scattered glass component fragments similar in style to those found in the mausoleums of the Western Xia kings, as well as records in local historical chronicles of Ningxia, it can be determined that there were Buddhist temples built here during the Western Xia period. (Note: Some theories suggest that these pagodas were dedicated to the Buddha, and it once enshrined Shakyamuni and many treasures of Tathagata (新华网陕西频道, 2003).) The two pagodas were most likely built contemporaneously with the Buddhist temples, and both were part of the imperial palace complex of Emperor Wulie of the Western Xia, Li Yuanhao. Subsequently, the temple buildings around the twin pagodas were destroyed during the Jiajing period of the Ming dynasty. In the Ming Dynasty's "Wanli Shuofang New Chronicle" the twin pagodas were recorded as important landmarks in the local area. In the fourth year of the Qing Dynasty's Qianlong reign, a magnitude 8 earthquake struck Ningxia, but the twin pagodas remained standing, although the extent of the damage is unknown.

In 1986, the cultural relics department of Ningxia organized a major restoration of the twin pagodas. During this restoration, archaeologists found that many of the sculptures and brick structures on the pagoda bodies did not conform to the style of the Western Xia period. Based on the situation of other repaired pagodas in the vicinity, it was determined that the pagodas had undergone multiple repairs during the Yuan and Ming dynasties, and the pagoda bodies were basically no longer the original structures built during the Western Xia period. Additionally, during this restoration, inscriptions in both Tangut and Sanskrit were found on the central pillars at the tops of the two pagodas, which were confirmed by carbon-14 dating to have been made in the late Western Xia period. In 1988, the twin pagodas of Baisikou were established as a national key cultural relic protection unit.

== Structure ==
The twin pagodas are located on a slope plateau named Baisikou on the eastern foot of the Helan Mountains, approximately 50 kilometers away from the old city area of Yinchuan. The site is surrounded by mountains and hills on three sides. The eastern pagoda is 39 meters high, while the western pagoda is approximately 36 meters high. (Note: There is also a claim regarding the tower body being 45 meters tall (罗哲文等著, 2006, 133).) Although the overall structure is similar, there are slight differences in appearance.

=== Eastern pagoda ===
East pagoda.

The eastern pagoda was primarily constructed using bricks and features an octagonal shape with thirteen eaves. Each floor consists of three parts: the pagoda body, the eaves, and the flat base. At the top of the pagoda, there is an inverted lotus-shaped finial, which supports a wheel of dharma. On either side below the finial, there are two guardian statues. The pagoda chamber is circular, and there are arched doors on the south side of the pagoda. The pagoda has a total of thirteen floors, with the first floor being plain, and the second to thirteenth floors adorned with molded and painted decorations at the walls and corners. Each eave of every floor has two tile brackets with animal head patterns, accompanied by protruding wooden stakes, which are decorative elements behind the animal heads. Wooden floors are installed between each floor, and wooden ladders allow access to the top floor. The interior of the pagoda is taller only on the first floor, with the subsequent floors being relatively shorter. The entire east pagoda tapers slightly from the bottom to the top, presenting a straight pyramid-shaped exterior.

=== Western pagoda ===
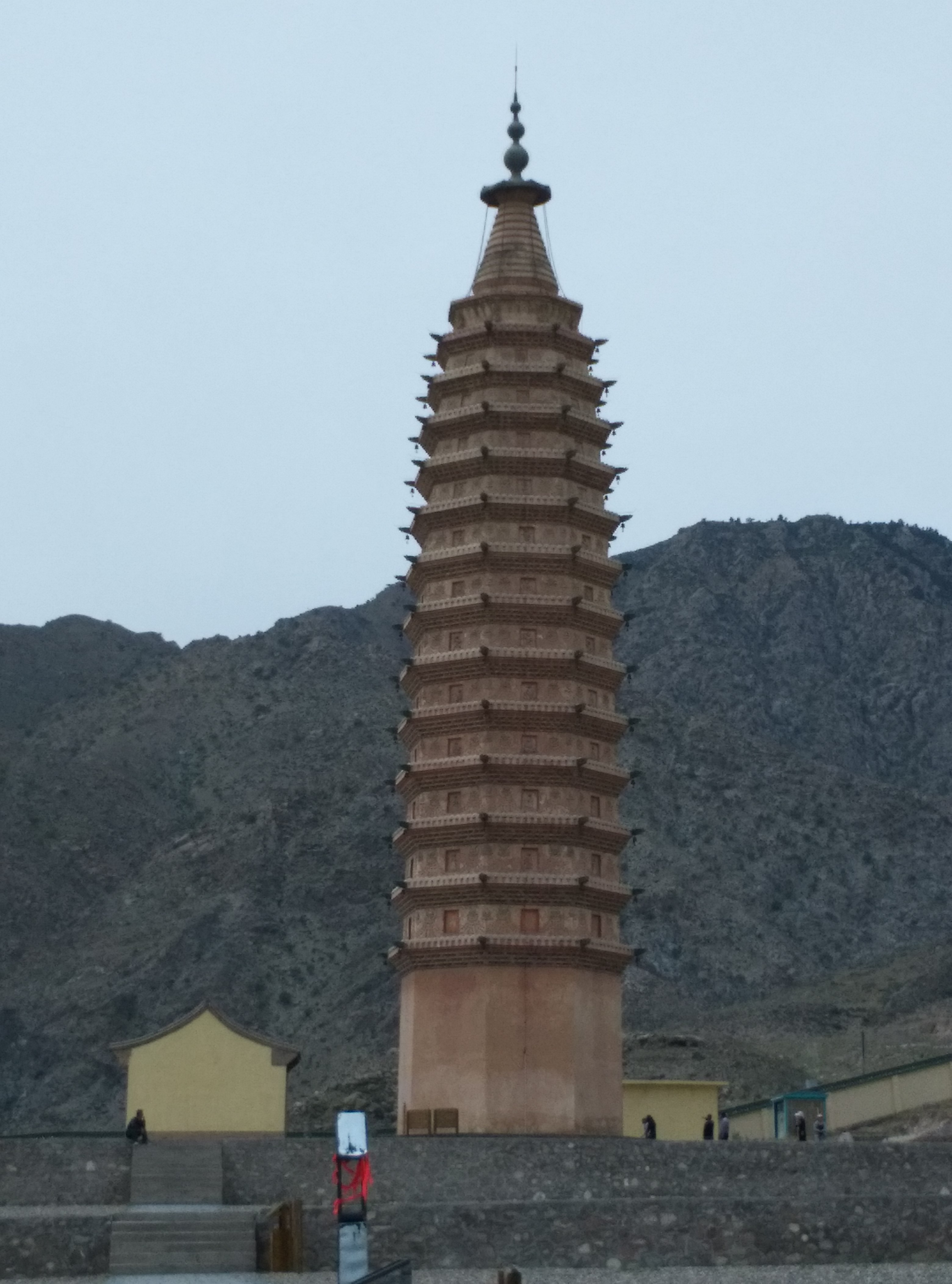
West pagoda.

The western pagoda, in terms of construction materials and appearance, is essentially the same as the eastern pagoda, though the western pagoda has a total of 14 floors. The first floor of the pagoda body is 6.24 meters high, relatively tall and large, accounting for about one-fifth of the total height of the pagoda body; it has an eave projection of 1.12 meters. The body of the second floor is 1.08 meters high, decreasing slightly as they go up, the thirteenth floor has a body height of only 0.74 meters. There is a narrow door on the south side of the first floor of the pagoda body, measuring 1.5 meters in height and 0.5 meters in width. Below the eaves on each side from the second floor upwards, there are colored statues of Buddhas and decorative patterns. Each floor has rectangular shallow niches in the center of the wall, totaling 96 niches. In these niches, the niches on the second floor cannot be reconstructed; on the third floor, there is one standing monk statue on each of the northwest, southwest, and southeast sides; on the fourth floor, there is one standing monk statue on each of the east, southeast, and northeast sides; the fifth and sixth floors each have 16 niches with seated Arhat statues, totaling sixteen Arhats; the seventh floor has 8 niches with guardian vajras; the eighth floor has 8 niches with life-releasing children; the ninth floor has 8 niches with guardian vajras; the tenth and eleventh floors each have 16 niches with bodhisattva offerings; the twelfth floor has 8 niches with treasures, with a treasure vase in the southeastern niche; the thirteenth floor has niches with eight auspicious symbols. On both sides of the niches are colored animal faces with seven tassels hanging from their mouths, forming an eight-shaped pendant, covering the wall.

There are colored patterns of jewel flames and cloud supports for the sun and moon at the corners of the pagoda walls. In the eastern niche of the twelfth floor of the west pagoda, there is a Western Xia inscription on the upper right side. On the flat base on the east side of the tenth floor, there is a complete green glass set animal. Inside the Buddha niche at the top of the pagoda, there is a hexagonal wooden central stupa pillar with a diameter of about 30 centimeters, with inscriptions in Western Xia and Sanskrit. Overall, the western pagoda is thicker than the east pagoda, with the upper part near the top having a larger taper, and a more rounded exterior shape.

== Protection ==
In 1986, due to the severe aging of some construction components of the pagoda, the Cultural Relics Department of Ningxia Hui Autonomous Region carried out large-scale repairs on the twin pagodas, which lasted from April to October of that year. In 2003, in order to protect the vegetation of the Helan Mountains, including the area around the pagodas, the Ningxia government implemented a ban on grazing and human access to the Helan Mountains, and all residents living near Baisikou were resettled.

Before the Spring Festival in 2012, the Cultural Relics Bureau, Religious Affairs Bureau, and Fire Brigade of Yinchuan City organized a fire inspection of many cultural relics and ancient sites, including the twin pagodas of Baisikou.

In 2014, the restoration work of the twin pagodas of Baisikou officially began, and the relevant restoration plan had been approved by the State Administration of Cultural Heritage. The lightning protection project for the twin pagodas was completed that year.

== Cultural relics ==
During the repair process in 1986, several artifacts were discovered at the top of the towers, including a clay sculpture of a multi-armed Maitreya Buddha, a seated copper Buddha of Tibetan Buddhism wearing a pointed hat, both of which exhibited typical features of the Yuan Dynasty. Two silk Buddhist paintings (partially damaged), one wooden chair, one pair of wooden vases, two bundles of silk paper flowers, and three pieces of stamped satin were found inside the towers.
