= Helan County =

Helan 贺兰县 حَ‌لًا ثِيًا
- County

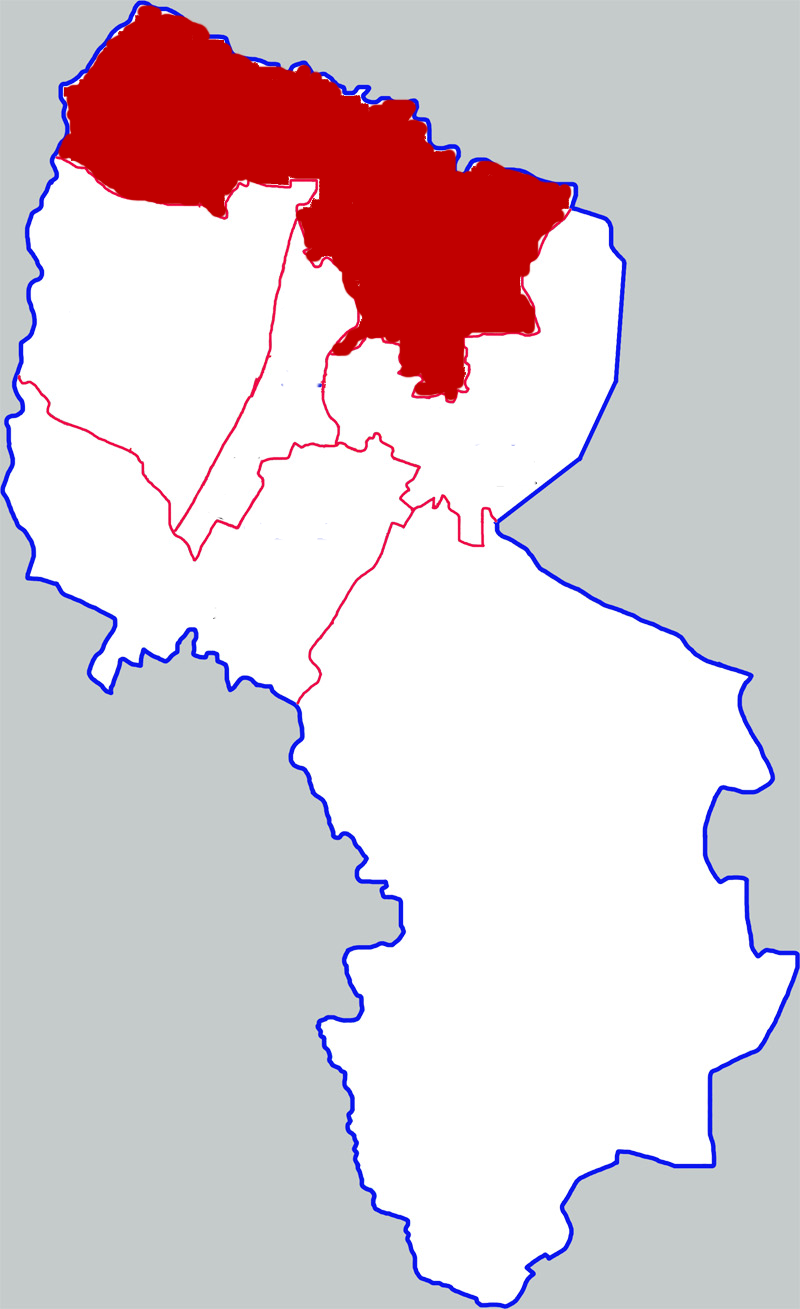
- Helan in Yinchuan

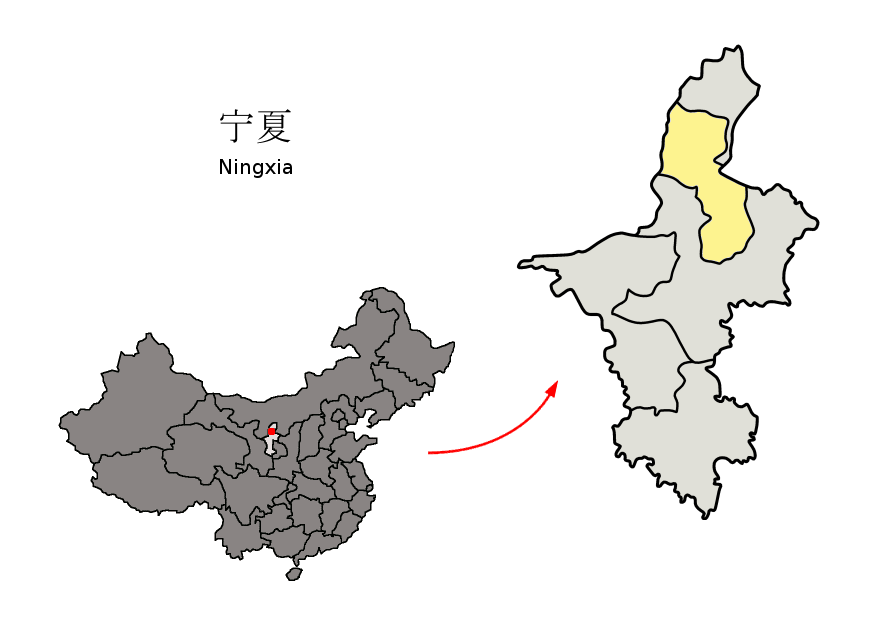
- Yinchuan in Ningxia
- Coordinates: 38°33′17″N 106°20′59″E
- Country: China
- Autonomous region: Ningxia
- Prefecture-level city: Yinchuan
- County seat: Xigang

Area
  - Total: 1,197.57 km^{2} (462.38 sq mi)

Population
  - Total: 222,981
  - Density: 186.195/km^{2} (482.242/sq mi)
- Time zone: UTC+8 (China Standard)

Helan County (simplified Chinese: 贺兰县; traditional Chinese: 賀蘭縣; pinyin: Hèlán Xiàn; Wade–Giles: Ho-lan Hsien, Xiao'erjing: حَ‌لًا ثِيًا) is a county of Ningxia Hui Autonomous Region, China, it is under the administration of the prefecture-level city of Yinchuan, the capital of Ningxia, and borders Inner Mongolia to the northwest. It has a total area of 1,600 km^{2} (620 sq mi), and a population of approximately 180,000 people.

== Characteristics ==
Helan County has developed industry in recent years; its newly developed industrial area is in the northern suburbs of Yinchuan, about eight kilometers from the city center. The area is accessible via national highway and freeway, and sits on about 4,240 acres (17.2 km^{2}) of land. This industrial area provides employment for residents of the county, and promotes agricultural development. The county government is located in the town of Xigang, and the county's postal code is 750200.

== Geography ==
The Yellow River flows through Helan County from the southeast to the northeast. In total, 21.25 kilometers of the river flows through the county. The quality of the river water is very high, and it is used for irrigation in the county.

The western part of the county is home to the Helan Mountains.

== Climate ==
Helan County belongs to the mainland climate region. Winters are long and cold, and summers are quite wet. Spring and Fall are relatively short. The average temperature during the summer is 22 degrees Celsius (72 degrees Fahrenheit), with a record high of 36.7 °C (98.1 °F). The average temperature in winter is −8 °C (18 °F), with a record low of −27.7 °C (−17.9 °F). Daily temperatures are highly variable, changing by an average of 10 degrees Celsius (20 °F) each day. Due to the large variety of topography in the county, regional climates also vary considerably. Notably, winter in the Helan Mountains region can last up to 10 months out of every year.

There is relatively little rainfall in Helan County, with an average of 99 millimeters (3.9 inches) each year. Daylight hours are long, totaling an average of 66% of each year.

Climate data for Helan, elevation 1,106 m (3,629 ft), (1991–2020 normals, extremes 1981–2010)
Month	Jan	Feb	Mar	Apr	May	Jun	Jul	Aug	Sep	Oct	Nov	Dec	Year
Record high °C (°F)	11.8 (53.2)	19.6 (67.3)	27.0 (80.6)	35.4 (95.7)	36.7 (98.1)	38.0 (100.4)	38.5 (101.3)	36.3 (97.3)	35.6 (96.1)	28.1 (82.6)	24.2 (75.6)	14.2 (57.6)	38.5 (101.3)
Mean daily maximum °C (°F)	−0.1 (31.8)	5.3 (41.5)	12.4 (54.3)	20.3 (68.5)	25.2 (77.4)	29.3 (84.7)	30.9 (87.6)	28.9 (84.0)	24.0 (75.2)	17.7 (63.9)	8.6 (47.5)	1.2 (34.2)	17.0 (62.6)
Daily mean °C (°F)	−7.3 (18.9)	−2.7 (27.1)	4.7 (40.5)	12.5 (54.5)	17.9 (64.2)	22.3 (72.1)	24.3 (75.7)	22.3 (72.1)	16.8 (62.2)	9.6 (49.3)	1.7 (35.1)	−5.4 (22.3)	9.7 (49.5)
Mean daily minimum °C (°F)	−12.8 (9.0)	−8.7 (16.3)	−1.5 (29.3)	5.5 (41.9)	10.9 (51.6)	15.8 (60.4)	18.4 (65.1)	16.9 (62.4)	11.4 (52.5)	3.8 (38.8)	−3.0 (26.6)	−10.1 (13.8)	3.9 (39.0)
Record low °C (°F)	−24.4 (−11.9)	−24.9 (−12.8)	−16.2 (2.8)	−7.3 (18.9)	−1.7 (28.9)	6.4 (43.5)	10.6 (51.1)	7.7 (45.9)	0.0 (32.0)	−10.3 (13.5)	−16.5 (2.3)	−24.4 (−11.9)	−24.9 (−12.8)
Average precipitation mm (inches)	1.4 (0.06)	2.1 (0.08)	4.9 (0.19)	9.1 (0.36)	19.1 (0.75)	26.2 (1.03)	40.9 (1.61)	33.8 (1.33)	29.8 (1.17)	12.0 (0.47)	4.3 (0.17)	0.8 (0.03)	184.4 (7.25)
Average precipitation days (≥ 0.1 mm)	1.6	1.1	1.7	3.0	4.6	5.7	7.1	7.7	7.2	3.9	1.8	0.9	46.3
Average snowy days	3.0	1.8	1.3	0.3	0	0	0	0	0	0.3	1.4	1.6	9.7
Average relative humidity (%)	55	47	43	38	44	52	61	65	67	61	62	59	55
Mean monthly sunshine hours	191.2	197.9	238.1	262.5	295.8	294.2	290.5	266.7	230.7	236.7	202.9	191.7	2,898.9
Percentage possible sunshine	63	65	64	66	67	66	65	64	63	69	68	65	65
Source: China Meteorological Administration

== Administrative divisions ==
Helan County has 1 subdistrict, 4 towns, 1 township and 2 other.

1 subdistrict

- Fuxingjie (富兴街街道)

4 towns

- Xigang (习岗镇, ثِ‌قَانْ جٍ)
- Hongguang (洪广镇, خْوقُوَانْ جٍ)
- Ligang (立岗镇, لِ‌قَانْ جٍ)
- Jingui (金贵镇, ڭٍ‌قُوِ جٍ)

1 township

- Changxin (常信乡, چَانْ‌ثٍ ثِيَانْ)

2 other

- Nuanquan Farm (暖泉农场, نُوًاٿُوًا نْوچَانْ)
- Nanliang Taizi Administration Committee (南梁台子管委会, نًالِيَانْ‌ تَاي‌زِ قُوًاوِخُوِ)

== Economy ==
On the flood plains of the Yellow River, agriculture is the primary form of industry. Forestry is an important industry in the shade of the Helan Mountains.

== See also ==
- Twin pagodas of Baisikou
