= Gö Khugpa =

11th century Tibetan monk and translator

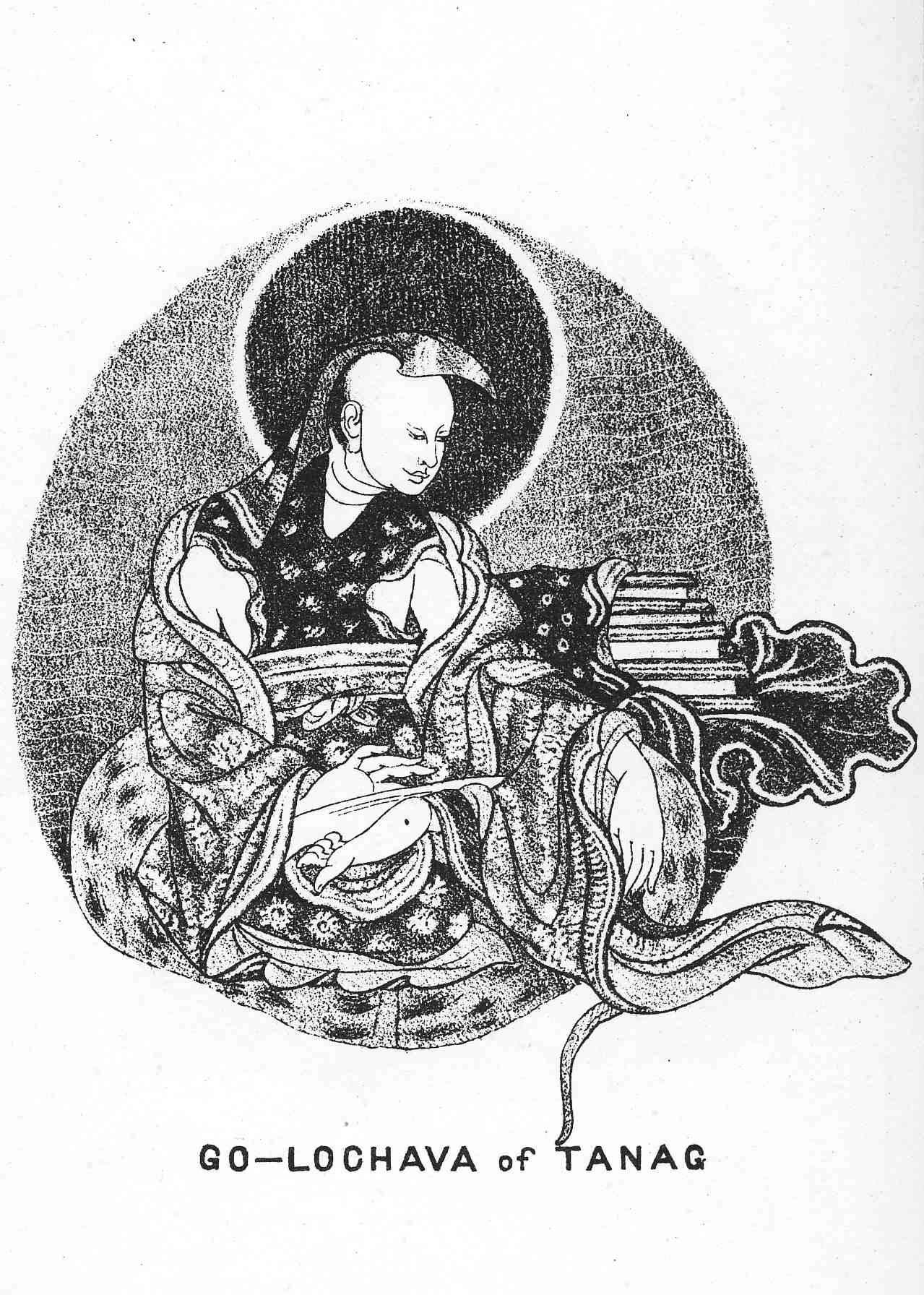
Gö Lotsawa ('Gö the Translator')

Gö Khugpa, 'Gos Khug-pa Lhas-btsas, Gö Kuk-ba-hlay-dzay, is also written as Khug-pa-Lhas-tsi, or simply 'Gos, was a famous Tibetan monk and translator (or lotsawa) of the 11th century.

He was born in the town of Tá-nag-phu in the province of Tsang. He travelled to India where he studied under 72 religious teachers. He learnt the sutras and mantras but was most interested in the Guhyasamaja Tantra which he assiduously promulgated in Tibet. The Guhyasamaja Tantra is considered to be, along with the Kalachakra Tantra and the Yamantaka Tantra, one of the 'Highest Yoga Tantras'.

His personal name was Lhas-btas ("Protected by gods"). His family name was 'Gos but, as his mother and father were both from the 'Gos family, he was often called 'Gos Khug-pa ("intermarried 'Gos").

He was very critical of the 'Ancient Translation School' of the Nyingma. In particular, he wrote a long criticism of the Nyingma Guhyagarbha Tantra, as he failed to find any lineage for the tantra in India and thought that it didn't resemble genuine Indian tantras, which led to it being excluded from the Tibetan scriptural canon, the Kangyur, which was compiled in the 14th century.

However, he composed several commentaries on the Yamantaka Tantra and performed the ceremony of Yamantaka according to the Nyingma rites.

In the lineage of the Tibetan Panchen Lamas there were considered to be four Indian and three Tibetan incarnations of Amitabha Buddha before Khedrup Gelek Pelzang, who is recognised as the 1st Panchen Lama. The lineage starts with Subhuti, one of the original disciples of Gautama Buddha. Gö Lotsawa is considered to be the first Tibetan incarnation of Amitabha Buddha in this line.
