= Helan Mountains =

Mountain range in China

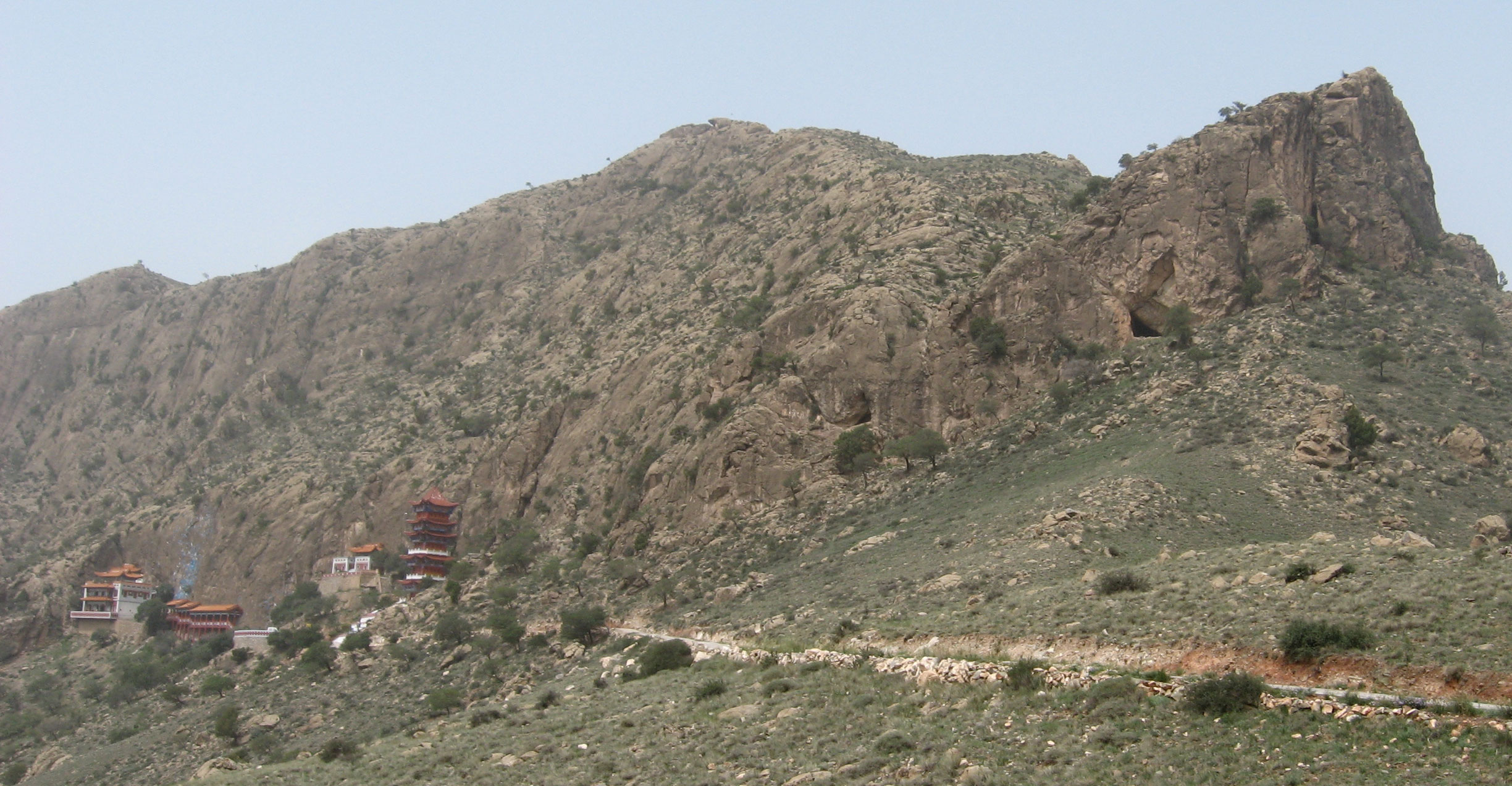
- Buddhist monastery in the dry and barren lower parts of the range

Highest point
- Elevation: 3,556 m (11,667 ft)
- Coordinates: 38°54′N 105°58′E

Geography
- Location: Inner Mongolia and Ningxia, China

Chinese name
- Chinese: 贺兰山
Transcriptions
Standard Mandarin
- Hanyu Pinyin: Hèlán Shān
- Wade–Giles: Ho^{4}-lan^{2} Shan^{1}
- IPA: [xɤ̌lǎn ʂan]

Alternative Chinese name
- Chinese: 阿拉善山
Transcriptions
Standard Mandarin
- Hanyu Pinyin: Ālāshàn Shān
- Wade–Giles: A^{1}-la^{1}-shan^{4} Shan^{1}
- IPA: [áláʂán ʂán]

Mongolian name
- Mongolian Cyrillic: Алшаа уул
- Mongolian script
Transcriptions
- SASM/GNC: Alaša aγula

Tangut name
- Tangut: 𗲡𗝢𘑗
- Miyake transcription: 2hin1 1lan1 1ngyr1

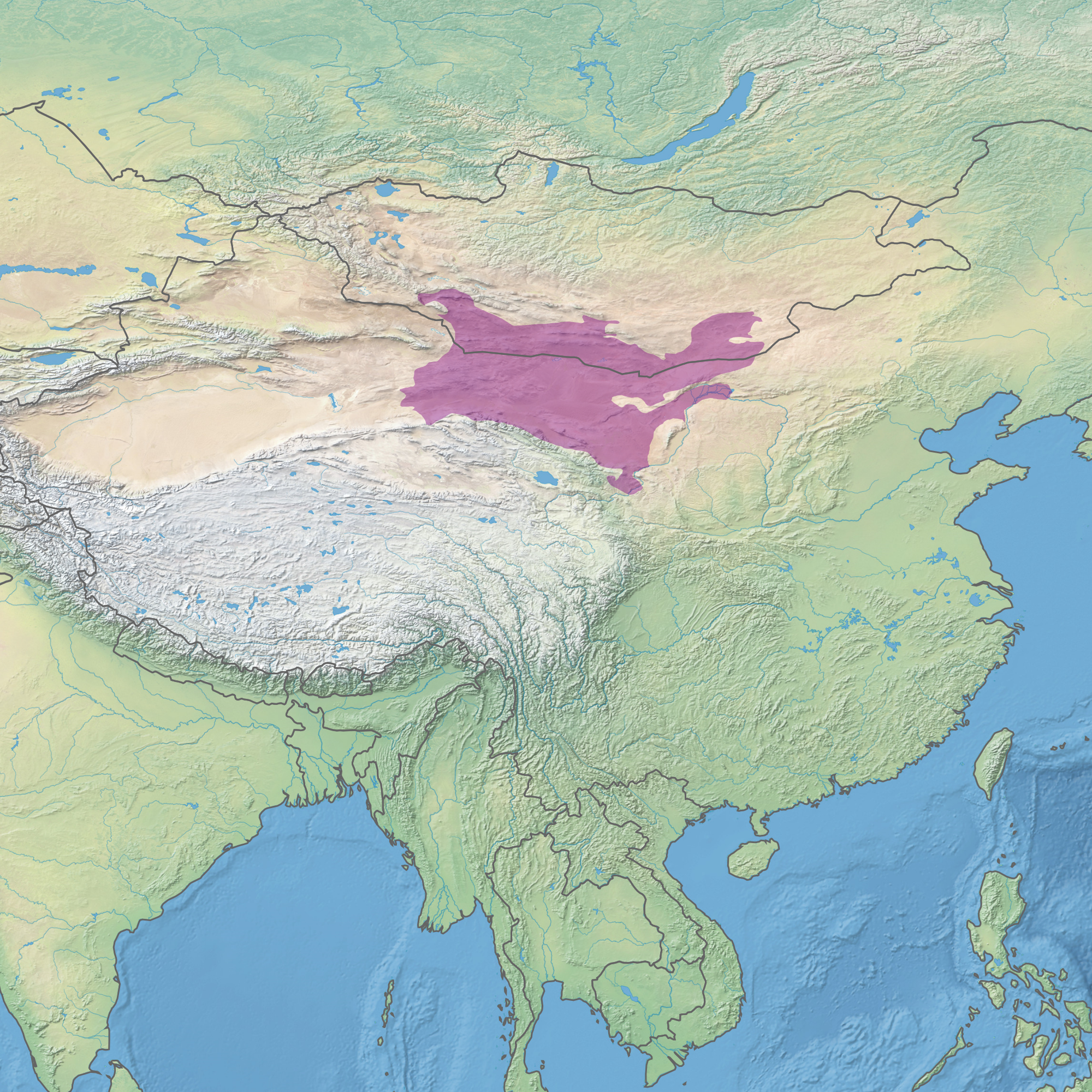
Alashan semi-desert plateau within wider Eastern Asia. The Helan Mountains are adjacent to the southeast.

The Helan Mountains, frequently called Alashan Mountains in older sources, are an isolated desert mountain range forming the border of Inner Mongolia's Alxa League and Ningxia. They run north–south parallel to the north-flowing Yellow River in the Ordos Loop section. The river is mostly east of the mountains, but in the north it crosses without making a significant gorge and flows on the west side. To the west lies the extremely arid Tengger Desert, while to the east is an irrigated area beside the Yellow River, in which lie the cities of Yinchuan and Shizuishan - a little further east of which lies the Mu Us portion of the Ordos Desert. To the north lies the Inner Mongolian city of Wuhai.

They are about 200 kilometres (120 mi) from north to south, from 15 to 50 kilometres (9.3 to 31.1 mi) wide and average about 2,000 metres (6,600 ft) in altitude (the Yellow River here is about 1,100 metres (3,600 ft) above sea level). Their highest peak is 3,556 metres (11,667 ft).

== Emerging wine industry ==
With the increasing popularity of Ningxia wines, the Chinese authorities have given approval to the development of the eastern base of the Helan Mountains as an area suitable for wine production. Several large Chinese wine companies including Changyu and Dynasty Wine have begun development in the western region of the province. Together they now own 20,000 acres (8,100 ha) of land for planting vineyards and Dynasty has ploughed 100 million yuan into Ningxia. In addition, the major oil company China Petroleum and Chemical Corporation has founded a vineyard near the Helan Mountains. The household appliance company Midea has also begun participating in Ningxia's wine industry.

== Gallery ==
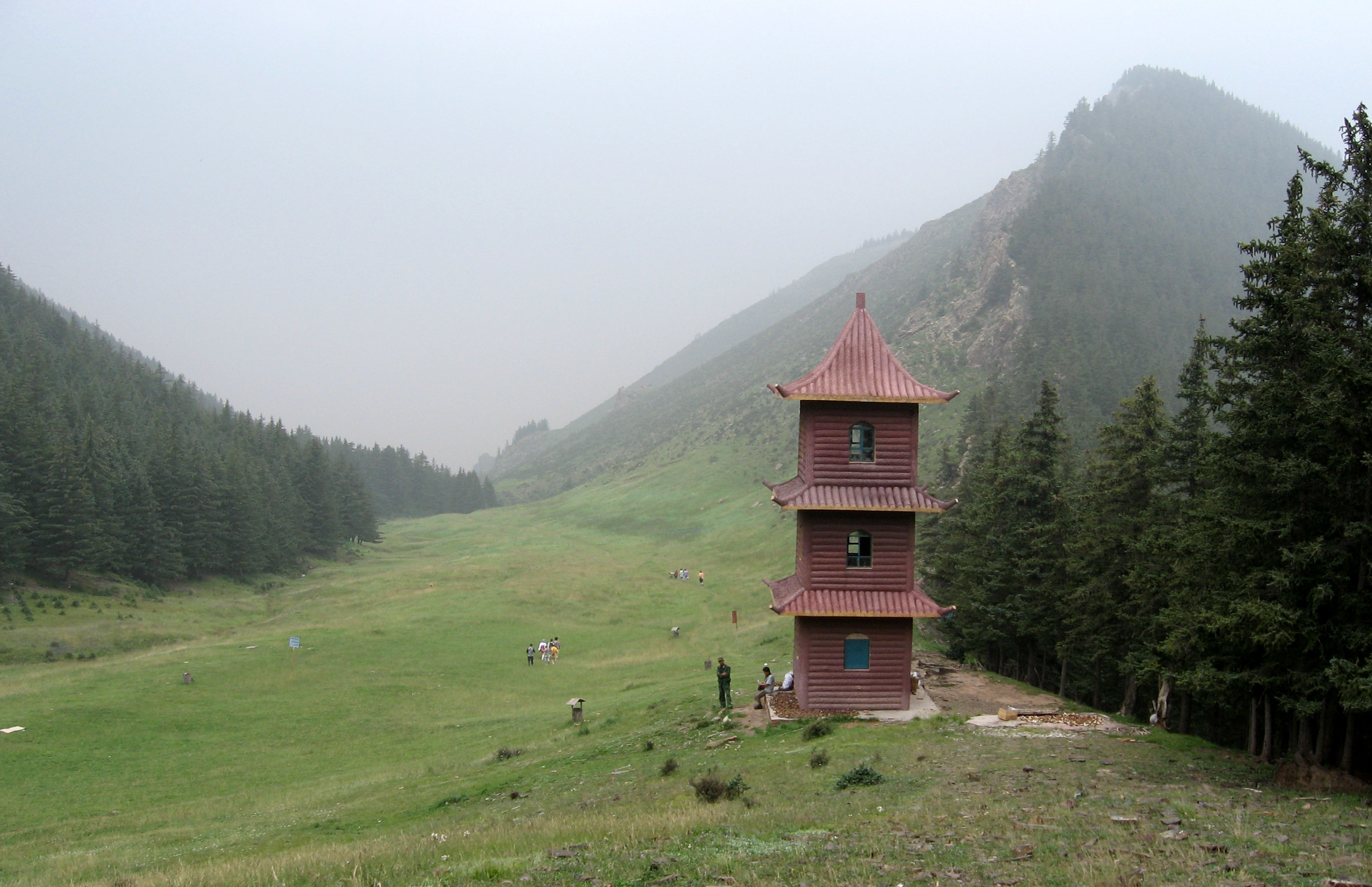
Landscape with modern pagoda in Helan uplands.

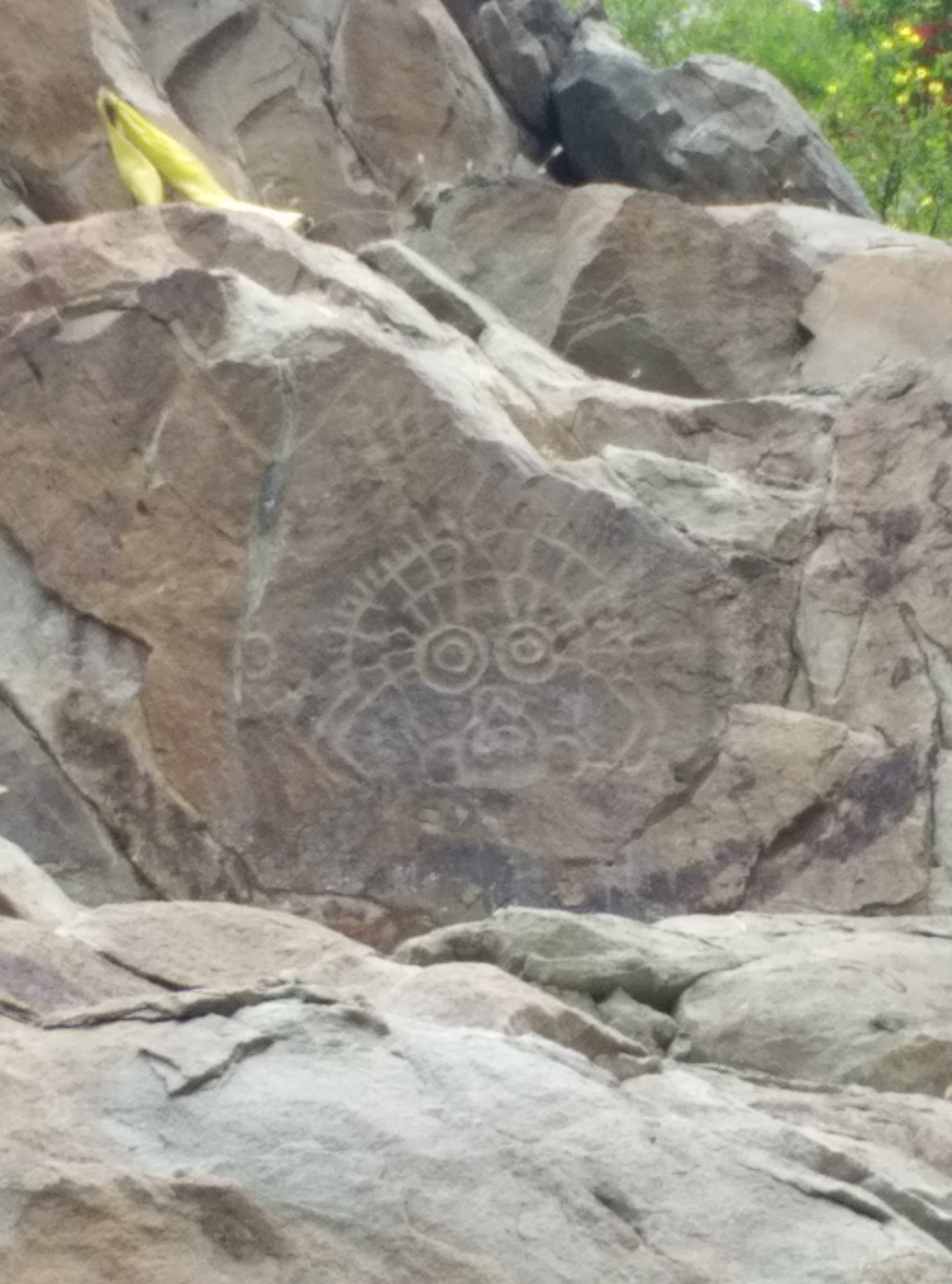
Petroglyph of a sun deity.

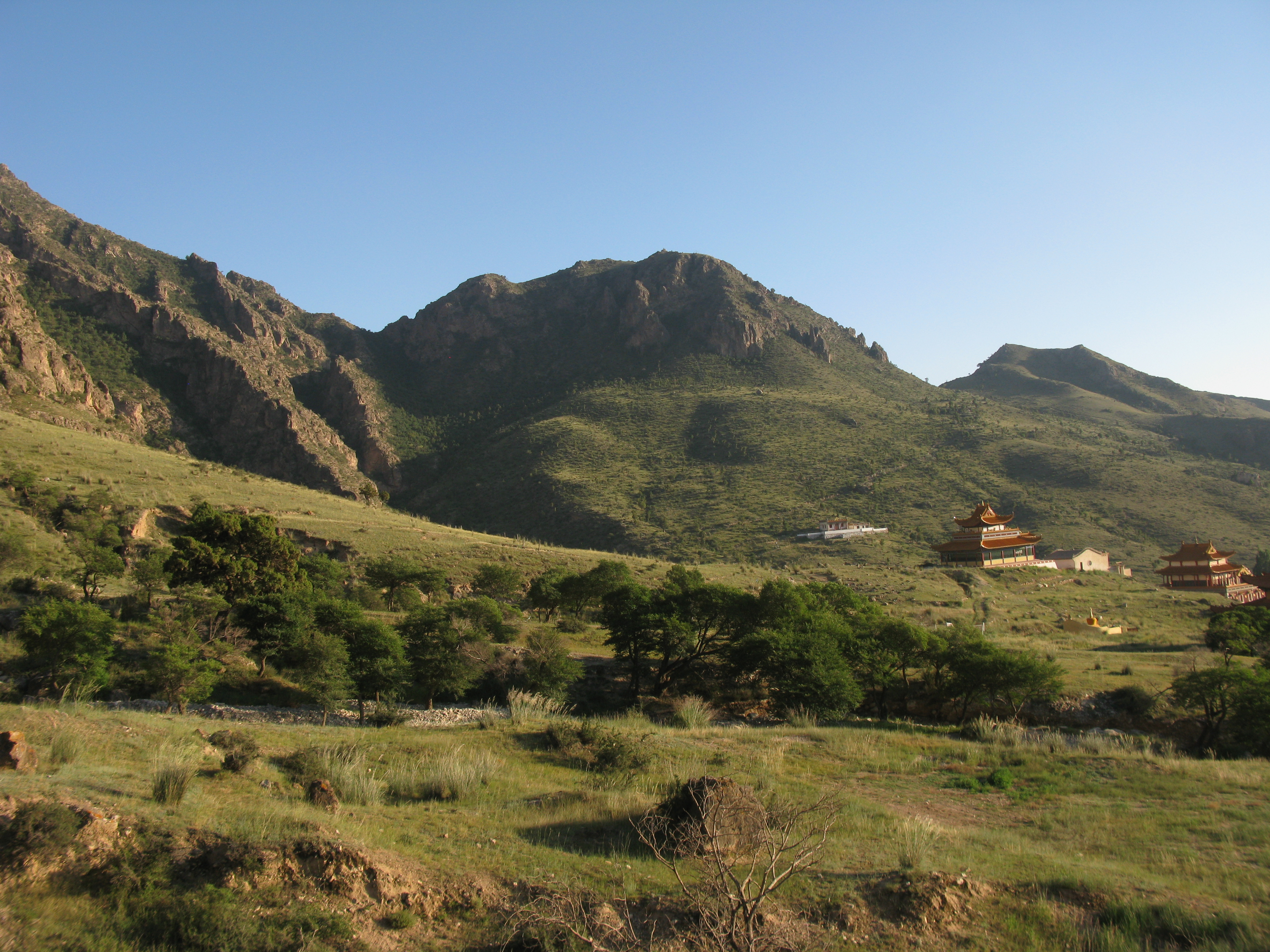
Helan mountain setting of Guangzong temple, Alxa league.

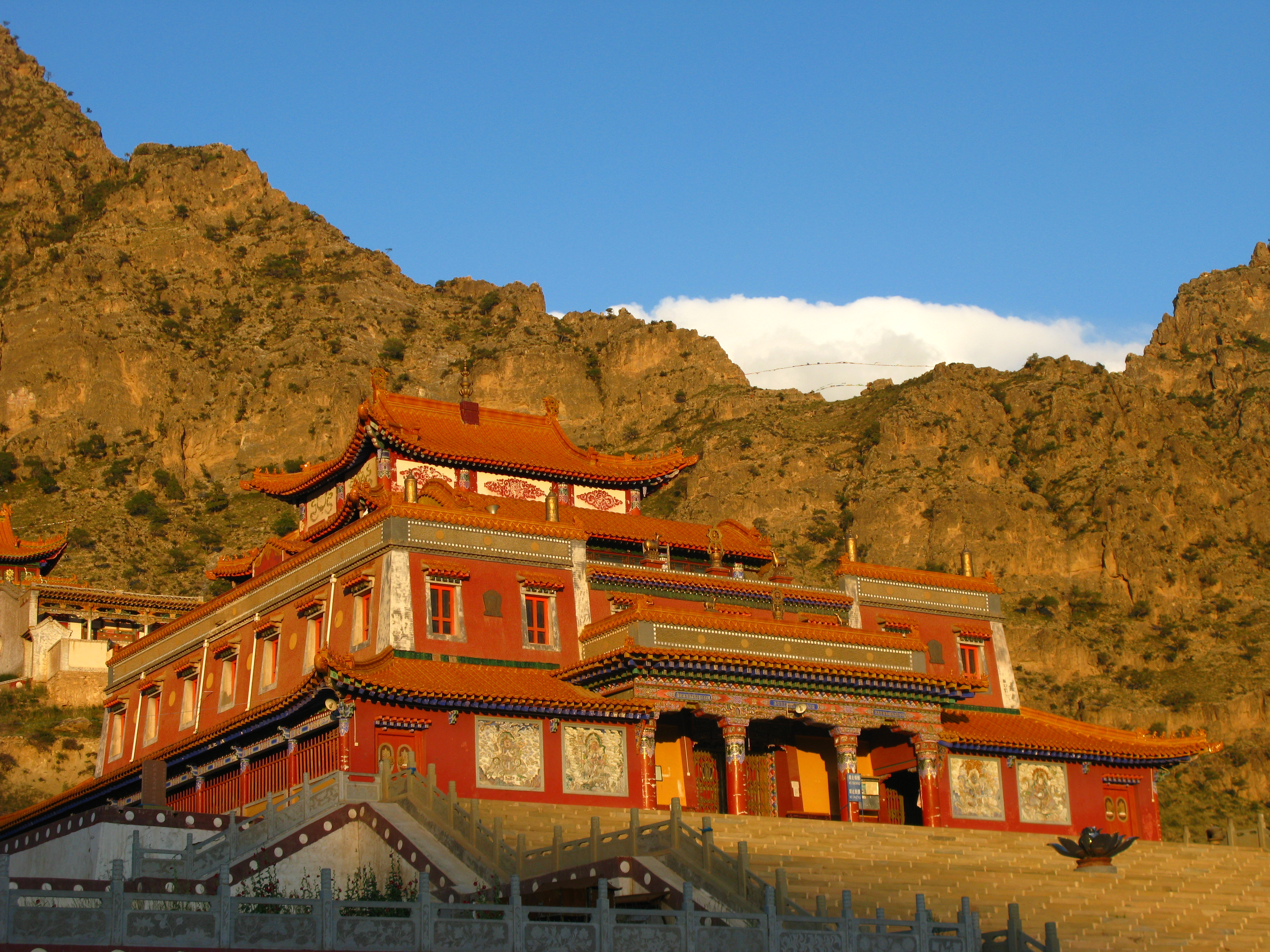
Guangzong temple, Alxa league.

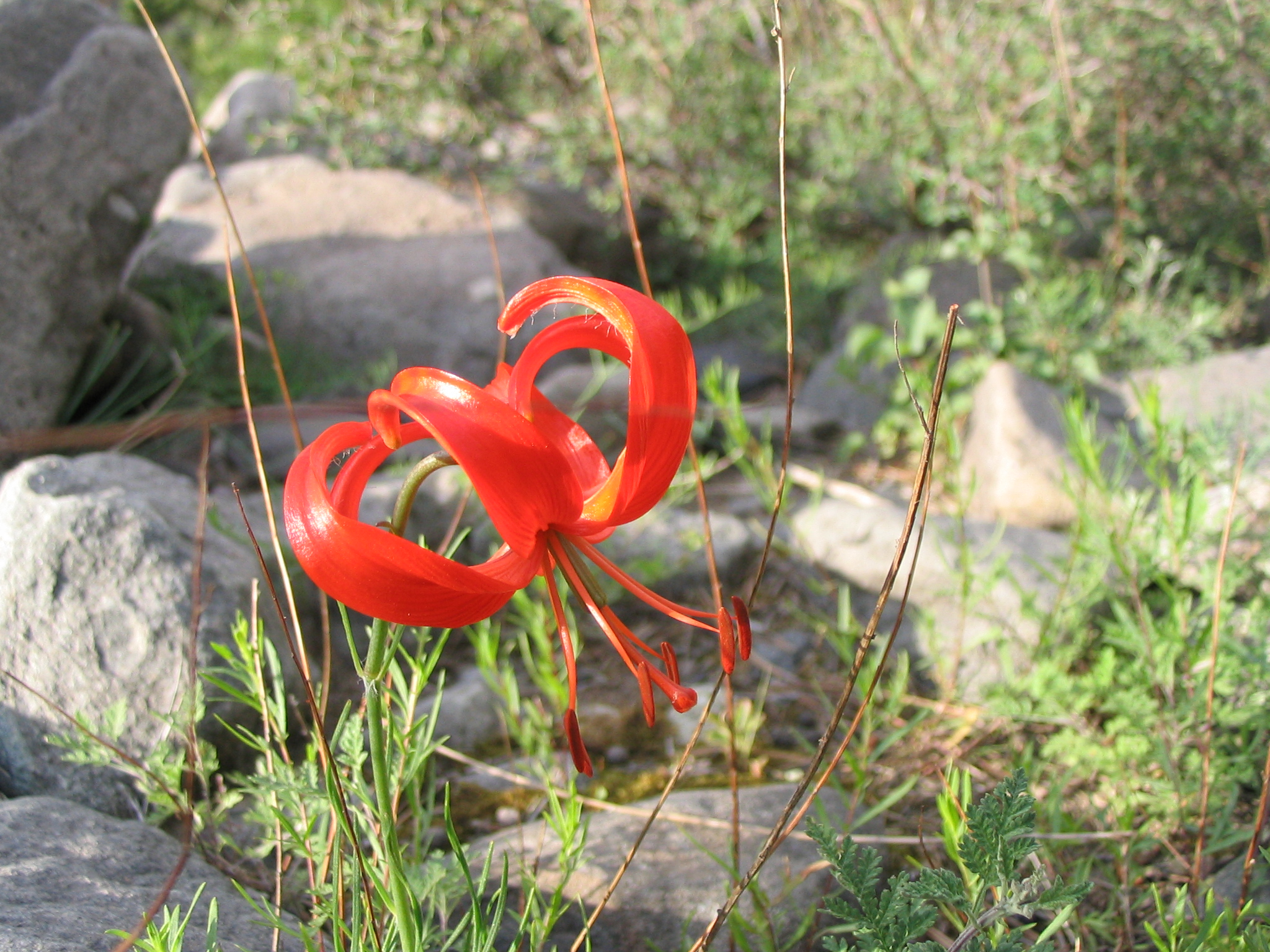
Helan wildflower: scarlet-flowered Lilium species.

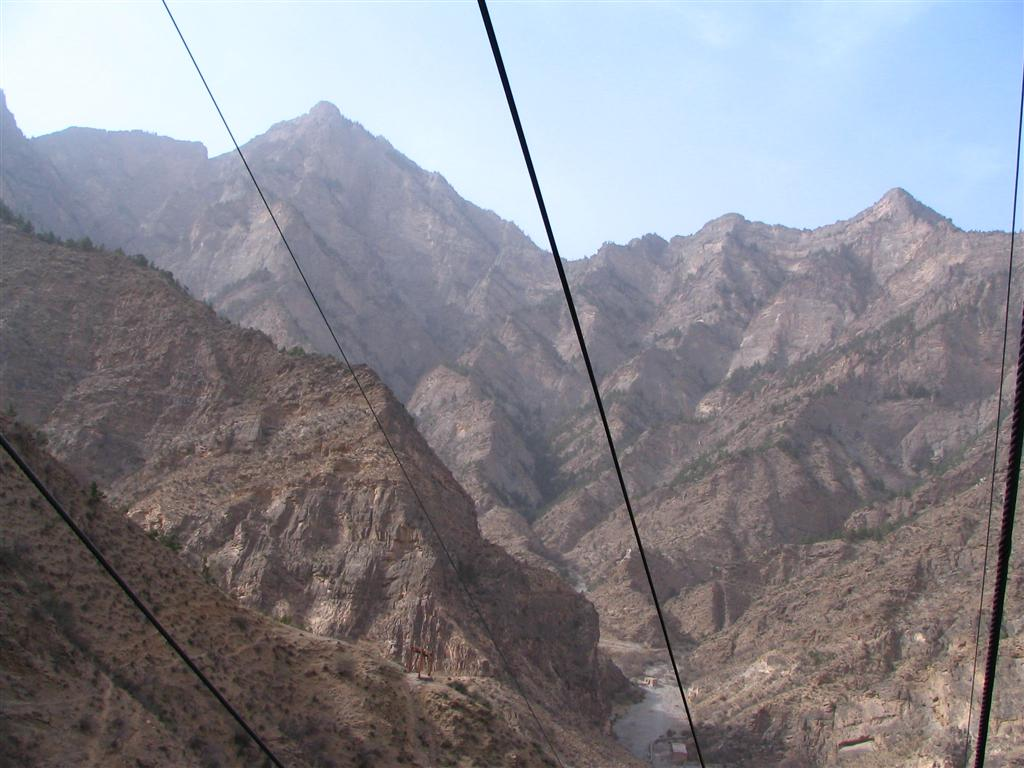
View from cable car, Helan Mountains, Ningxia.

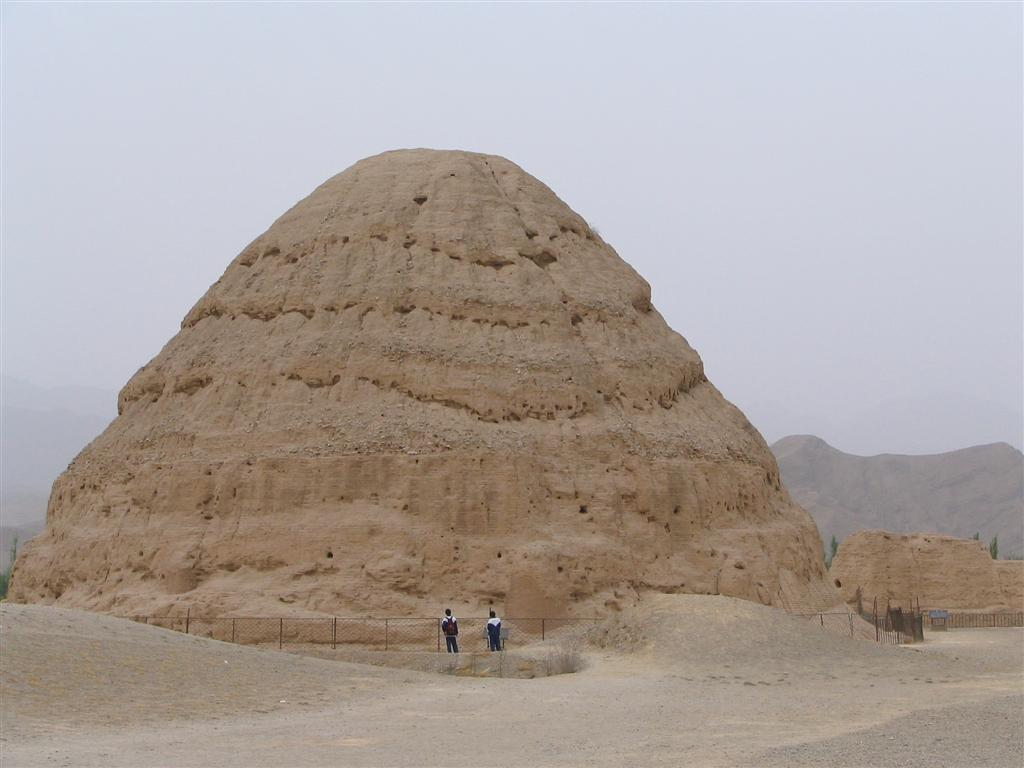
Remains of Western Xia (Tangut Empire) mausoleum no. 3, foot of Helan Mountains, Ningxia.

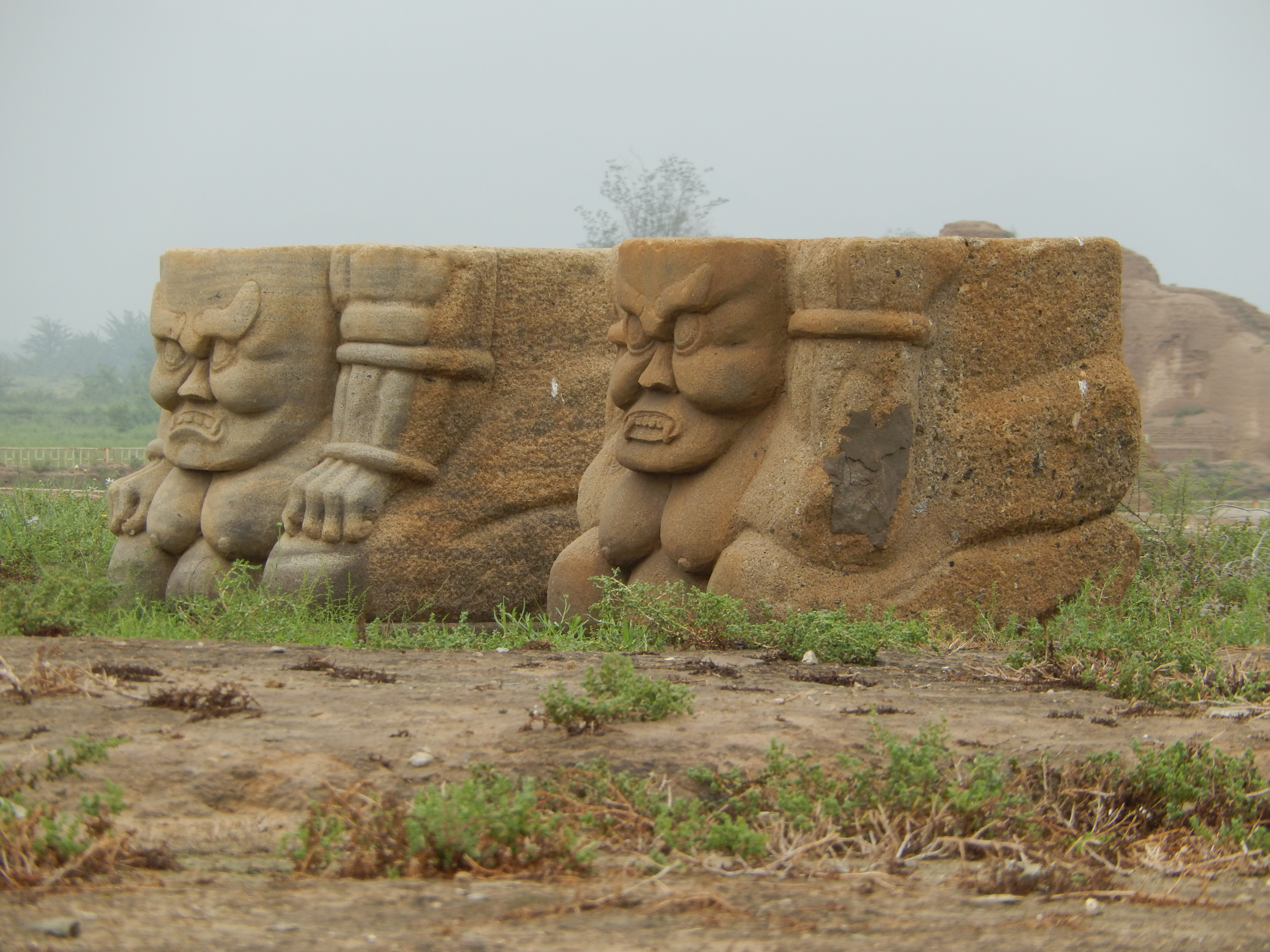
Fierce, hag-like grave guardians sculpted on two stele bases, mausoleum no. 3, Western Xia mausoleums.

== See also ==
- Twin pagodas of Baisikou
- Baisigou Square Pagoda
- Western Xia mausoleums
