= Lijia =

Lijia may refer to:

== Places in China ==
=== Towns ===
- Lijia, Jiangsu, in Changzhou, Jiangsu
- Lijia, Heishan County, in Heishan County, Liaoning
- Lijia, Anyue County, Sichuan
- Lijia, Guangyuan, Sichuan
- Lijia, Linshui County, Sichuan
- Lijia, Nanchong, Sichuan
- Lijia, Zhejiang, in Jiande, Zhejiang

=== Townships ===
- Lijia Township, Fujian, in Qingliu County, Fujian
- Lijia Township, Qinghai, in Haidong, Qinghai

=== Subdistricts ===
- Lijia Subdistrict, Chongqing
- Lijia Subdistrict, Dalian, Liaoning

== People ==
- Xu Lijia, Chinese sailboat racer
- Lijia Zhang (Zhang Lijia), Chinese journalist

== Other ==
- Lijia Taoism, early school of religious Taoism
