= Qianhuang Senior High School =

- 江苏省前黄高级中学
- Qianhuang, Wujin District, Changzhou City, Jiangsu Province, China

Information
- Type: High school
- Motto: "honest" (诚)
- Established: 1939

Qianhuang Senior High School (Chinese: 江苏省前黄高级中学) a high school in Jiangsu Province, China. It was founded in 1939. The old campus is located in Qianhuang, Wujin District, Changzhou City, and it covers an area of 379 Mu. The new Campus is located in Hutang, Wujin District, Changzhou City, and its area is 250 Mu. In 1957, the school was named the first batch of key middle schools in Jiangsu Province. In 1960, it was commended as "National culture and education system's advanced group". In 1999, it got through "National model ordinary high school" with high level; it was rated "Exemplary Schools in Jiangsu Province" and "Civilized Unit of Jiangsu Province" two periods consecutively.

In education and management practice, Qianhuang Senior High School always adheres to the "people-oriented" educational philosophy, deepen the educational and internal management system, insisting on the idea of "Rule the school by law and morals". And the school motto is "honest" "诚".
