= Qiaozhuang, Sichuan =

Qiaozhuang 乔庄镇
- Town
- Location in Sichuan
- Coordinates: 32°35′19″N 105°13′54″E
- Country: People's Republic of China
- Province: Sichuan
- Prefecture-level city: Guangyuan
- County: Qingchuan County
- Time zone: UTC+8 (China Standard)

Qiaozhuang (Chinese: 乔庄; pinyin: Qiáozhuāng) is a town under the administration of Qingchuan County, Sichuan, China. As of 2020, it administers the following seven residential communities and 18 villages:

- Qinxing Community (秦兴社区)
- Fangwei Community (方维社区)
- Wanzhong Community (万众社区)
- Huilong Community (回龙社区)
- Chengjiao Community (城郊社区)
- Huangping Community (黄坪社区)
- Kongxi Community (孔溪社区)
- Zhangjia Village (张家村)
- Shiyuan Village (石元村)
- Dagou Village (大沟村)
- Chashu Village (茶树村)
- Zaoshu Village (枣树村)
- Xinsheng Village (新生村)
- Jiefang Village (解放村)
- Qunfeng Village (群丰村)
- Wali Village (瓦砾村)
- Mingjing Village (明镜村)
- Wulong Village (乌龙村)
- Gongjiahe Village (弓家河村)
- Duiping Village (碓坪村)
- Sanpan Village (三盘村)
- Yaolin Village (遥林村)
- Daba Village (大坝村)
- Dawu Village (大屋村)
- Nanxi Village (南溪村)

In October 2019, Huangping Township (黄坪乡), Wali Township (瓦砾乡), Kongxi Township (孔溪乡), and Daba Township (大坝乡) were abolished. Qiaozhuang absorbed their administrative areas.
