= Xie Qimei =

Chinese diplomat (1923–2009)

Xie Qimei (Chinese: 谢启美; pinyin: Xiè Qǐměi; 1923–2009) was a Chinese diplomat. He was the Under-Secretary-General of United Nations from 1985 to 1991.

== Biography ==
Xie was born in Wujin District, Changzhou, Jiangsu. He received a bachelor's degree of Math from National Central University in 1947. He started teaching in National Central University and Tsinghua University. Xie became translator and staff member of the Chinese Ministry of Foreign Affairs after the People's Republic of China established in 1949. In 1973, when United States and China set up the liaison office with each other, Xie was dispatched to United States and worked in the office as culture counselor. He continued working in US after both country establish the official relationship. He then worked at Chinese Ministry of Foreign Affairs and Permanent Mission of the PRC to the United Nations, until being appointed as Under-Secretary-General of UN in June 1985.

From 1992 to 2002, Xie was the president of UN Association of China. He died in 2009.

== Publications ==
- China And United Nations;《中国与联合国》，谢启美、王杏芳主编，世界知识出版社1995年版
- Facing the United Nations in 21st Century;《面向21世纪的联合国》，谢启美、杨成绪等编，世界知识出版社，1996年
