= Lijia, Guangyuan =

Lijia 李家镇
- Town
- Location in Sichuan
- Coordinates: 32°33′41″N 106°12′23″E
- Country: People's Republic of China
- Province: Sichuan
- Prefecture-level city: Guangyuan
- District: Chaotian District
- Time zone: UTC+8 (China Standard)

Lijia (Chinese: 李家; pinyin: Lǐjiā) is a town in Chaotian District, Guangyuan, Sichuan province, China. As of 2020, it administers Wangyuanshan Residential Community (望远山社区) and the following eleven villages:

- Yongle Village (永乐村)
- Xinjian Village (新建村)
- Liushui Village (流水村)
- Qinglin Village (青林村)
- Weixing Village (卫星村)
- Minzhu Village (民主村)
- Yixing Village (易兴村)
- Shuiguan Village (水观村)
- Jiangjia Village (蒋家村)
- Wangjiaya Village (王家垭村)
- Xieyi Village (协议村)
