= Muyu =

Muyu may refer to:

- Muyu people, an indigenous ethnic group of Western New Guinea
  - Muyu language
- Wooden fish (木鱼; 木魚; Mùyú), an Asian percussion instrument usually associated with Buddhist monks
- Muyu, Hubei (木鱼; 木魚; Mùyú), a town of Shennongjia, Hubei, China
- Muyu, Sichuan (木鱼; 木魚; Mùyú), a town of Qingchuan County, Sichuan, China
- Be a Mother (母语; 母語; Mǔyǔ), 2011 Chinese film

== See also ==
- Muyu Muyu, archaeological complex in Peru
