= Chunqiu Yancheng =

Ancient city remains in China

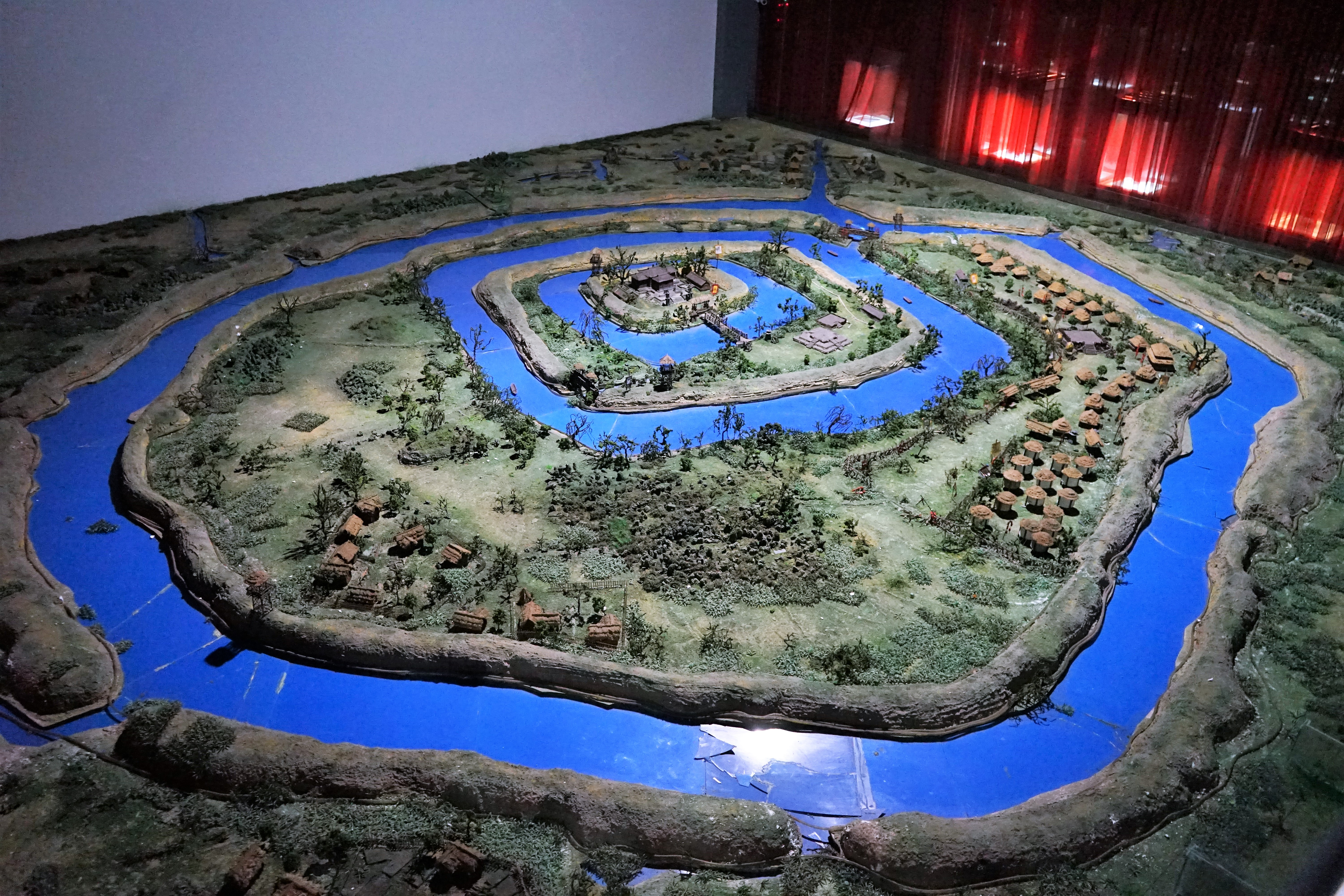
Model of Yancheng site.

Chunqiu Yancheng is the remains of an ancient city from the Spring and Autumn period. It is now rebuilt and displayed as a tourist attraction rated as an AAAAA site, the highest official tourism rating.

Changzhou Spring and Autumn Yancheng site is located in Wujin, the southern suburb of Changzhou, about 15 minutes away by car. Yancheng was surrounded by three rivers inside and outside. From the inside to the outside, the city, the city river, the inner city, the inner city river, the outer city, the outer city river, three cities, and three rivers. This architectural form is unique among the ancient city ruins in China. Most ancient cities have one city and one river, and a few have two cities and one river or two cities and two rivers.

The site currently consists of three concentric artificial rivers that once surrounded the village. Around 2007, construction was being finished on shops and a museum in traditional style catering to the many tourists that come to Yancheng each year. With much of the original site now covered in grass with many remaining trees, it is most popular with Changzhou locals as a historical theme amusement park.

== History ==
=== Origin of name ===
There are two versions of the story about the origin of the name Yancheng(淹城).

1. Yancheng was the capital of Yan in the late Shang dynasty and early Zhou dynasty. Yanjun was the sovereign of Yan in the east of Qufu, Shandong Province. According to legend, the Election is king Zhou Cheng and Shang dynasty descendants Wugeng conspiracy to launch a rebellion against the elected king, was destroyed by King Zhou, led the remnants of Shandong fled to the South, here for the river cut, a pile of soil for the city, still called "election." In ancient times, the character "yan" of three points was common with the character "yan" without three points of water, which has been passed down to the present day, hence the name "Yancheng."
2. In the late Spring and Autumn period, prince Jiza of the State of Wu was dissatisfied with lu's assassination of Wang Liao to seize the throne, determined to break with lu's violent politics," life does not enter the State of Wu, "they built a city in Yanling river, to show the determination of Yancheng, the state name "Yancheng."

=== Documental records ===
The earliest historical record of Yancheng is yuan Kang's Yue Jue Statement - Wu Di Biography in the Eastern Han dynasty（袁康《越绝书—吴地传》）: "毗陵县南城，故古淹君地也。东南大冢，淹君子女冢也，去县十八里，吴所葬。 "

Changwu area was called Yanling (延陵) in the Spring and Autumn period and changed to Piling (毗陵) in the Han dynasty. During the Spring and Autumn period, it was the vassal of Jiza (季扎), the fourth son of Shoumeng, king of Wu. The Northern Song dynasty "Peace and World" (北宋《太平寰宇记》）said: "常州府春秋时为吴国内地。"

"Records of the Grand Historian" （《史记》）said： "吴公子季扎所据，是为延陵之邑。" Wu was destroyed by Yue and returned to Yue. Yue was beaten by the Chu and returned to the Chu in the Warring States period. Therefore, Yue Juishu is called a "Flooded city." （淹君城）

In the Qing dynasty, "A Summary of Historical Geography" (《读史方舆纪要》) said："淹城，在 (常州) 府东南二十里，其城三重，壕垫深宽，周广十五里。"

In the book of "Shang, Zhou and CAI Zhong" (尚书·周书·蔡仲之命), it is mentioned that "King Cheng attacked Huaiyi in the east, and then carried out the election and completed his reign. In the Tang dynasty, Kong Yingda wrote justice shuyue," (成王东伐淮夷，遂践奄，作成王政。成王既践奄，将迁其君于蒲姑，" 汉孔安国尚书传曰， "成王即政，淮夷、奄国又叛，王亲征之，遂灭奄而徙之，以其数反覆") At the beginning of the regent of The Duke of Zhou, Elections and Huai Yi from the management, CAI chaos, Zhou Zheng and decided. At the beginning of the reign of King Cheng, Huai Yi rebelled against Elections and went to the army. King Cheng attacked Huai Yi in the east and destroyed the electoral State. (周公摄政之初，奄与淮夷从管、蔡作乱，周公征而定之。成王即政之初，淮夷与奄又叛，成王亲往征之。成王东伐淮夷，遂践灭奄国。)

In addition, there are scattered records in some local Chronicles of the Changwu area, such as Xianchun Piling Zhi (《咸淳毗陵志》)of the Song dynasty says, "Yancheng was in Yanzheng Township of Yanghu Lake." ("淹城在阳湖延政乡")

== Scenic Spots ==
=== Attractions ===
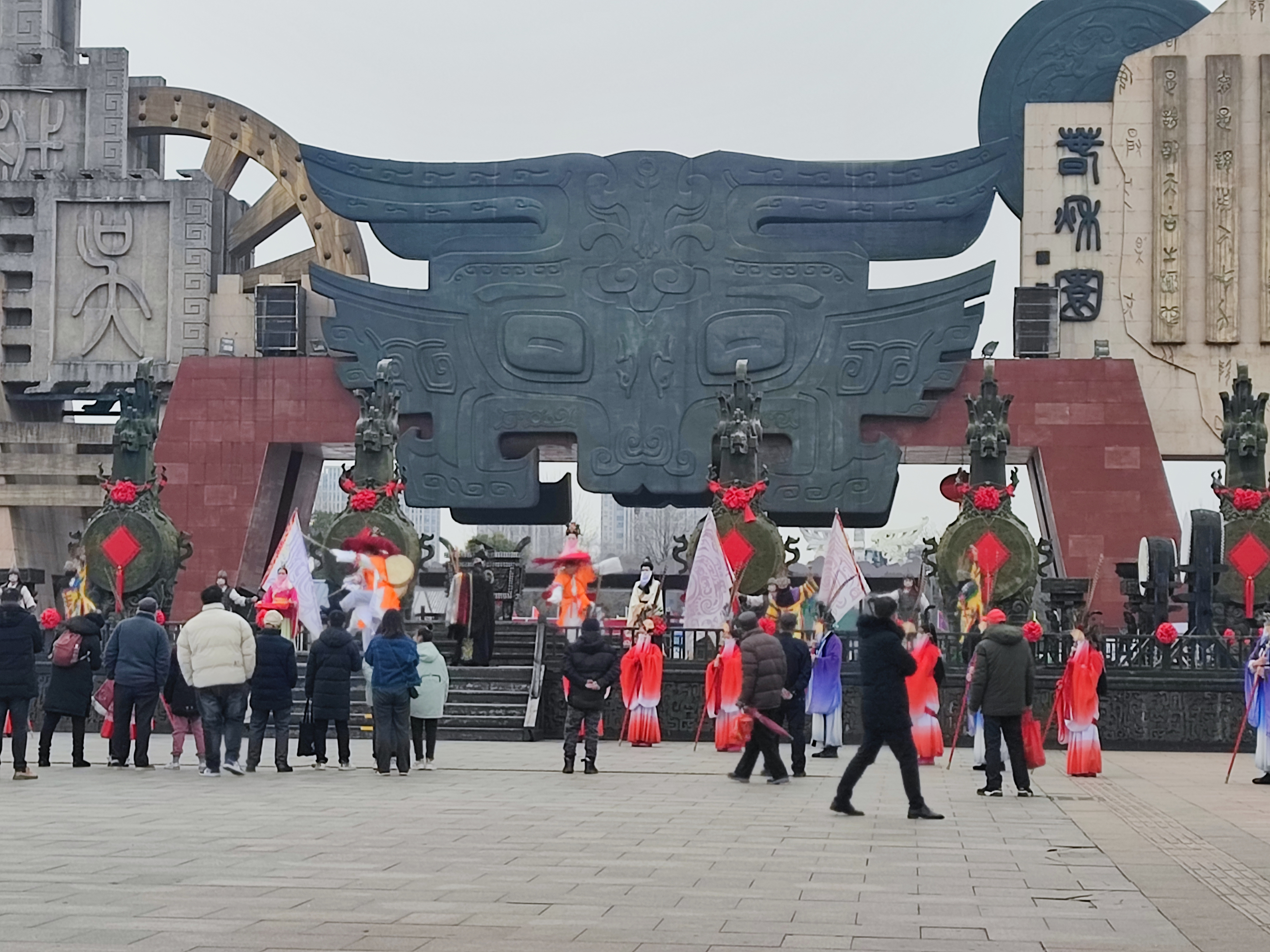
Spring and Autumn Paradise

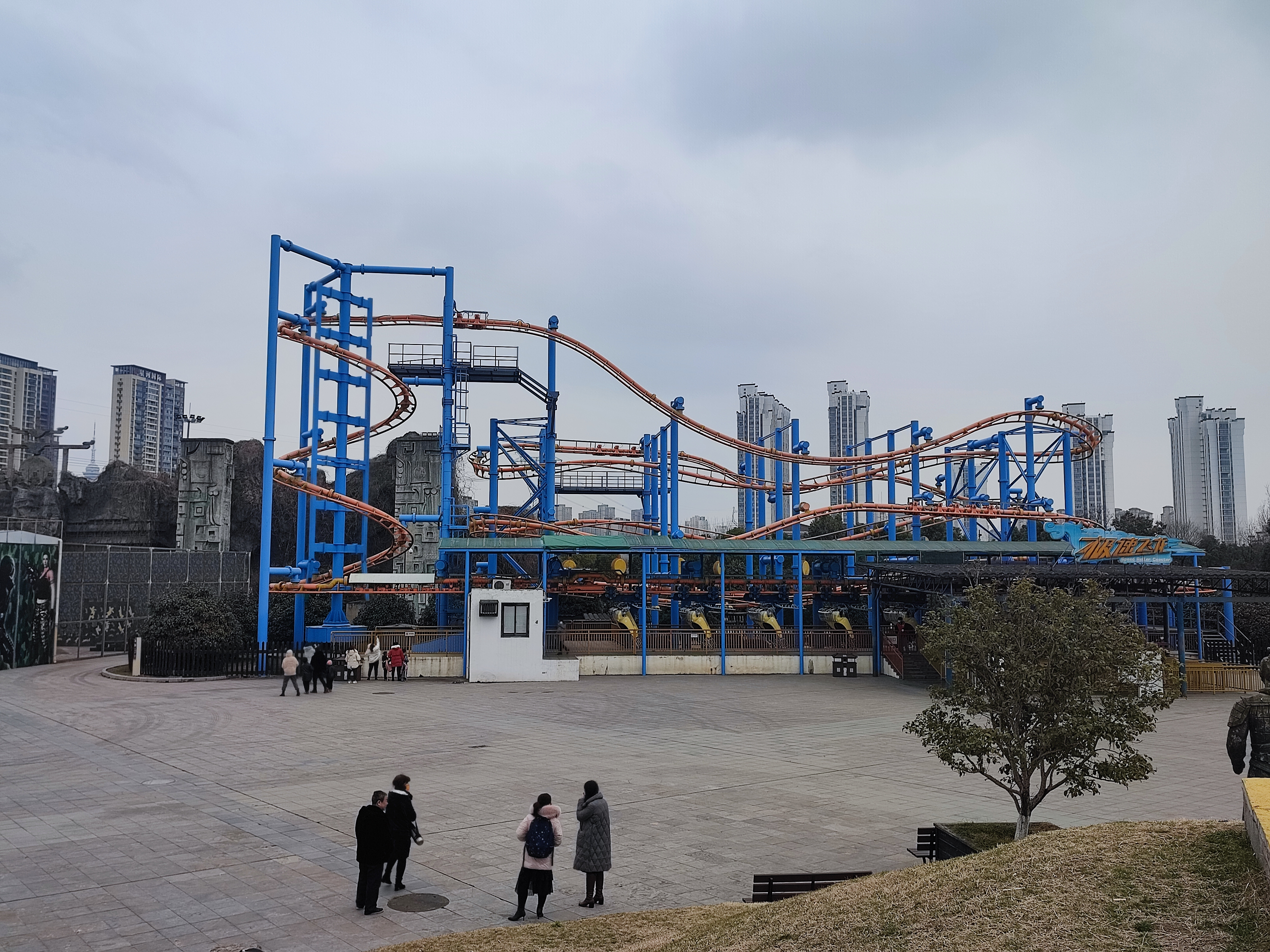
Spring and Autumn Paradise

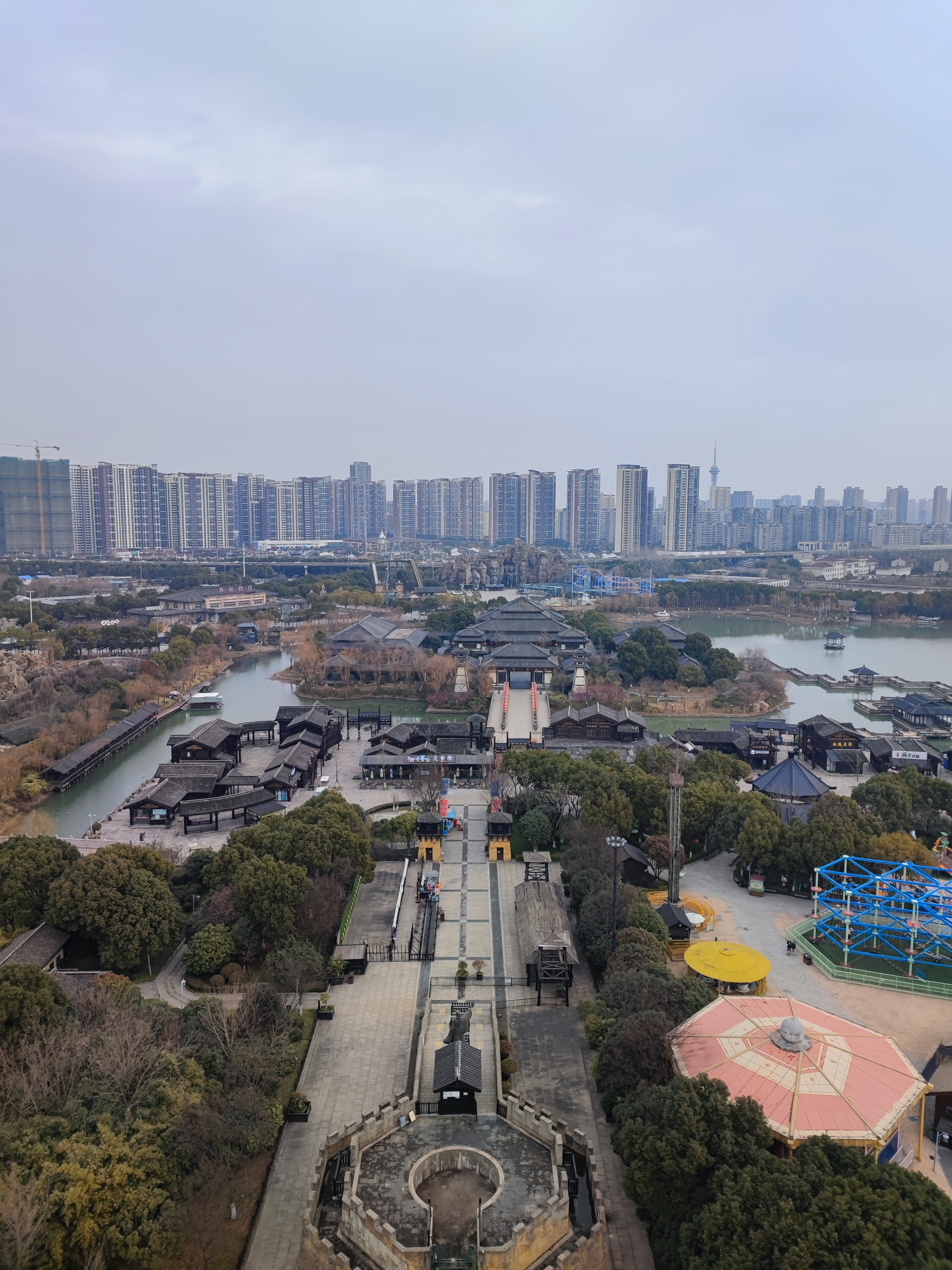
Yancheng Ruins Park

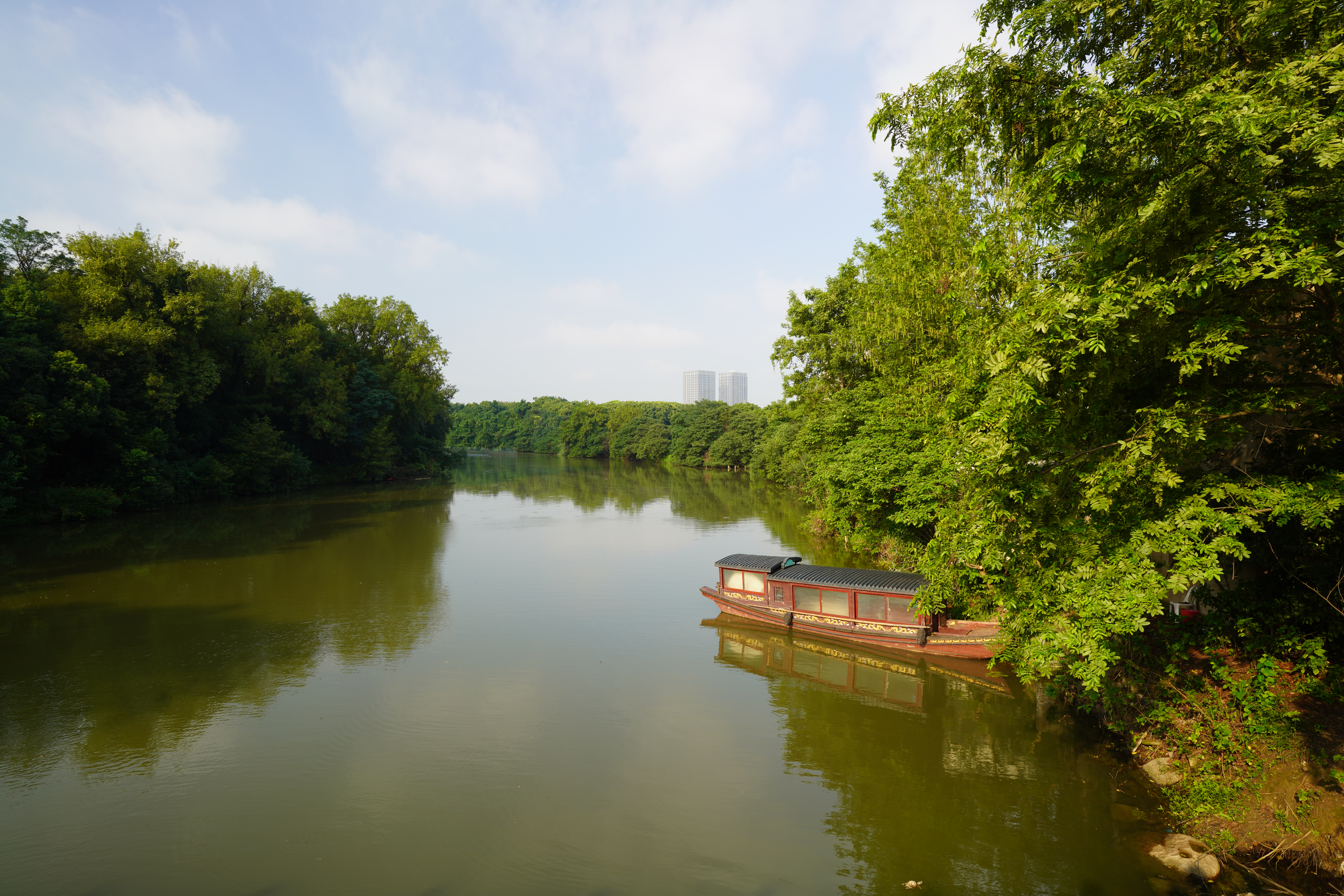
Yancheng Ruins Park

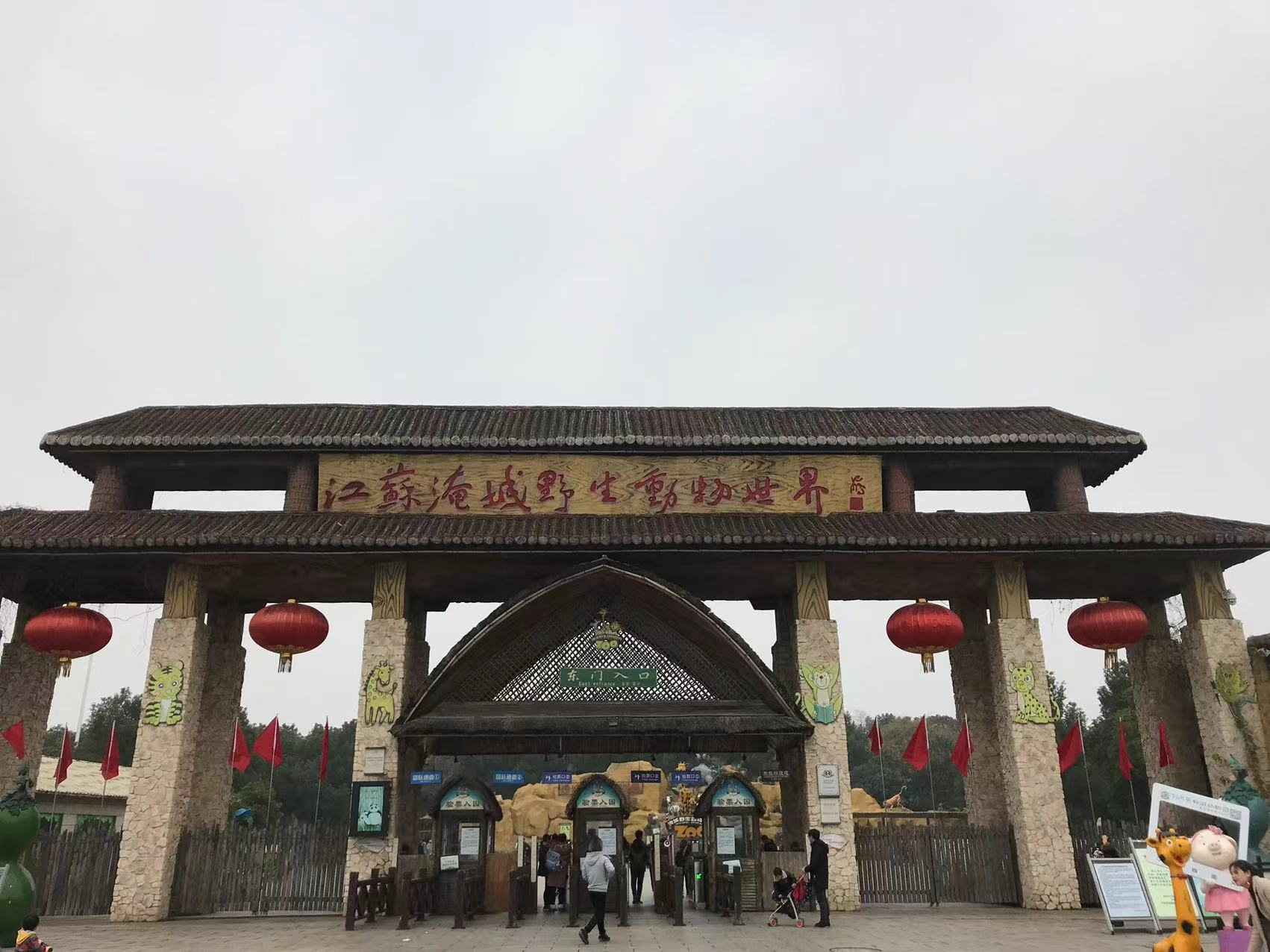
Yancheng Wild Animal World

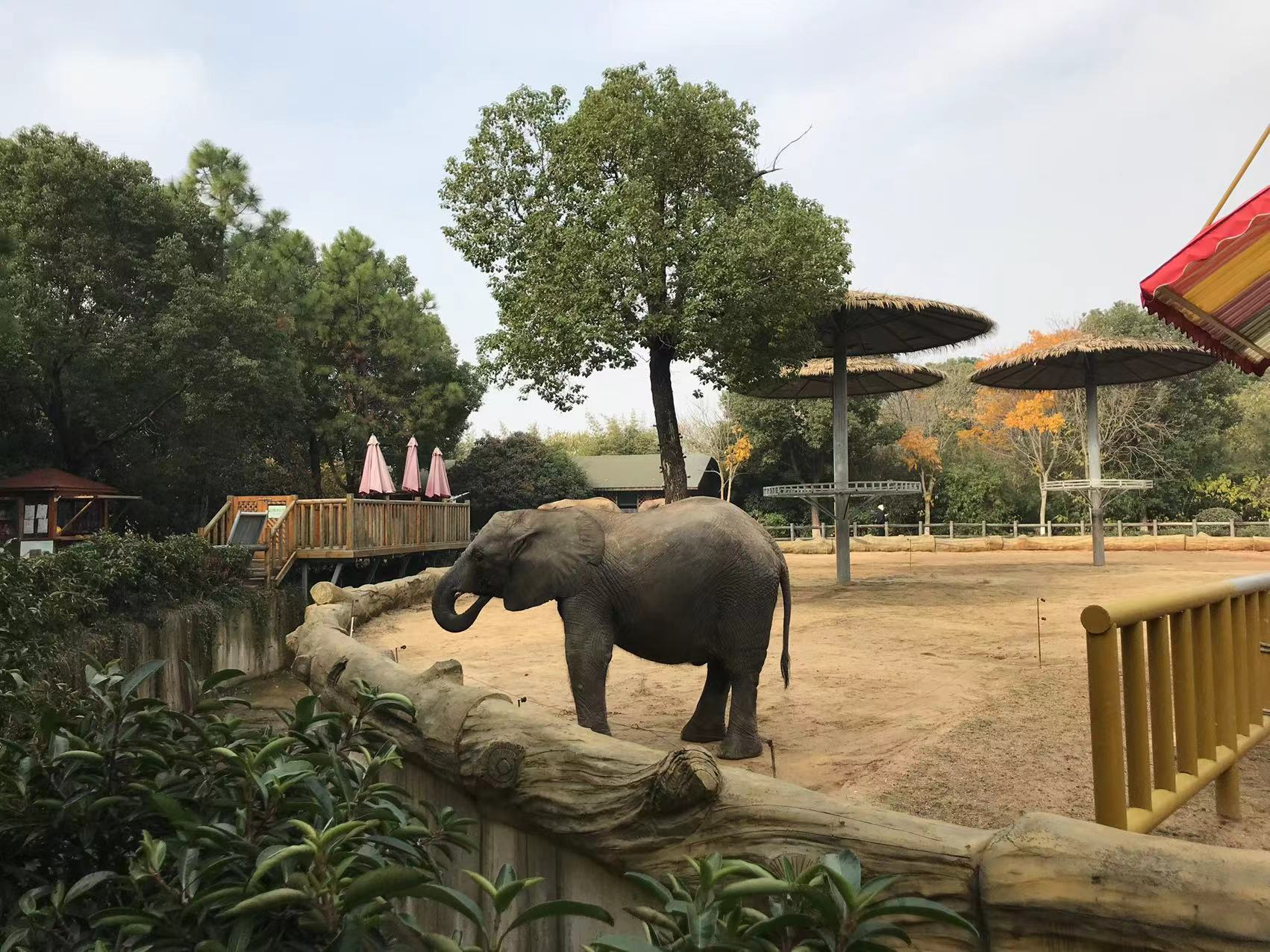
Yancheng Wild Animal World

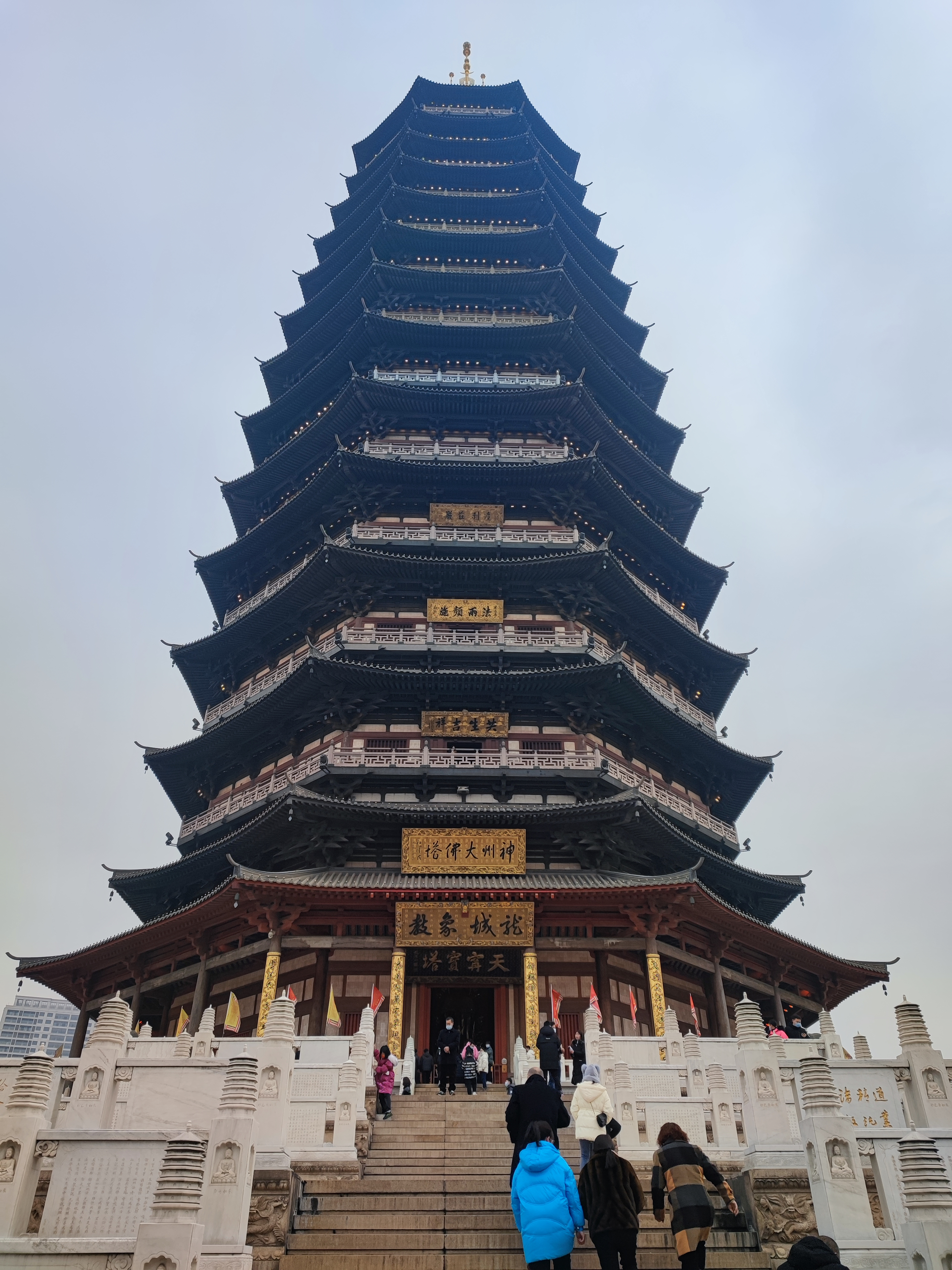
Po Lam Temple

The whole area has various attractions, including Yancheng Ruins Park, Yancheng Spring and Autumn Paradise, Yancheng Wild Animal World, Yancheng Traditional Commercial Neighborhood, and Yancheng Po Lam Temple.

==== Spring and Autumn Paradise ====
Yancheng Spring and Autumn Park is the core area and pillar industry of the Yancheng Tourism area, and it is also the first spring and Autumn theme park in China. Spring and Autumn Paradise is built on the east and north of the Yancheng Site. It takes the Spring and Autumn period's political, military, economic, and cultural aspects. It combines static viewing projects, interactive performing arts projects, and experiential amusement projects under the artistic conception of spring and Autumn culture in the form of situational experience. The park environment atmosphere layout design is unique. Not only has the distinctive historical and cultural characteristics of the Spring and Autumn period, but it also does not lose modern aesthetic and fashion elements, reflecting the creative integration of tradition and modernity. All the equipment and facilities adopt modern technology, integrate traditional Chinese culture, extend the cultural connotation through theme amusement and performance, and increase tourists' participation, interaction, and entertainment. The project creativity has set several first in the domestic tourism industry.

==== Yancheng Ruins Park ====
The site of Yancheng during the Spring and Autumn period has a history of more than 2700 years, which is the most complete and unique ground city site in China. Its architectural form of "three cities and three rivers" is unique globally. The site is 850 meters long from east to west and 750 meters wide from north to south, with about 650,000 square meters. Its size fits the record of "A city of three li, a Guo of seven li" in Mencius. More than 1,000 precious cultural relics were unearthed, including four canoes, more than 20 bronzes, and much primitive celadon and pottery. In 1988, Yancheng Site was listed as one of the key cultural relics under national protection. In 2009, it won the Gold Medal of the United Nations Environmental Sustainable Development Project.

==== Yancheng Wild Animal World ====
Yancheng Wild Animal World exhibits endangered animals from around the world. In 2015, Yancheng Wildlife World set up a panda house and introduced two giant pandas from Wolong.

==== Yancheng Traditional Commercial Neighborhood ====
The traditional commercial neighborhood Located in the east of the spring and autumn Yancheng site, covering an area of 235 mu, the imitation of Han and Tang dynasties, with a total construction area of 45000 square meters, with Wujin culture as the core, for the guests from all over the world to provide a variety of consumer choice, is a concentration of citizen square, museum, cultural entertainment show, private collections, Chinese medicine health care keeping in good health, catering leisure is a body comprehensive cultural business district, There are Yancheng Food Street for catering, Yancheng Cultural Street for the exhibition of arts and crafts, and Yancheng Traditional Chinese Medicine Street for outpatient service. These three streets have their characteristics and have a strong attraction to corresponding consumer groups.

==== Po Lam Temple ====
Located in the Spring and Autumn period, Yancheng site park is about 1 km west. The Temple was built by emperor Xiaomin (557) of the Northern Zhou dynasty and was named Fa Hua. It was destroyed during the reign of Song Chongning (1102–1106). In the third year of The Ming dynasty (1405), the Temple was rebuilt by the eminent monk Abbot Wei Xin. Ming Zhengde Bingyin eight years (1513), Jinling Bhikshu Buddha Yuan, Fa Sheng raised before and after the two temples. At its peak, there were 1408 palaces, which were spectacular and prosperous. The expanded and rebuilt Baolin Temple is grand in scale and rich in Buddhist culture. It takes inheriting Guanyin culture and carrying forward Buddhist spirit as the theme to realize the close combination of Buddhism and modern tourism. Yancheng Baolin Temple was fully completed and opened in October 2015. Baolin Guanyin Pavilion, which is 91.9 meters high and dedicated to the three-sided ten-sided Avalokitesvara bodhisattva 39.9 meters high, is the center and landmark building of the entire Temple.[1]

== Evaluation and Honors ==
=== Evaluations ===
- The French "China House Tour Group" evaluated it as "a pearl of Chinese culture and historical sites."
- The Tokyo National Museum director said that its development value is no less than the Mausoleum of the Qin dynasty.
- The late professor Fei Xiaotong, a famous sociologist, believed that it was one of the wonders of the East, with high-grade cultural and tourist resources.
- The site of Ancient Yancheng is just like a pearl inlaid in the cultural landscape of the Spring and Autumn period, shining with peculiar historical brilliance and containing enchanting charm.
- In 2007, Yancheng was jointly evaluated as "China's First water City" by China Red Tourism Network, Party Construction magazine of the Publicity Department of the CPC Central Committee, Hongqi Press, and other authoritative media.
- Yancheng, the first "turtle city" in China, is another model of Zhouyi culture in practice.

=== Honors ===
- Yancheng was declared a national key cultural relic protection site by The State Council in 1988.
- In 2004, at the World Heritage Conference of Suzhou, Yan City was praised as "a sample of city defense in the era of Cold weapons, and a military fortress of Wu and Yue fighting for hegemony."
- In 2007, Yancheng was rated as the first water city south of China by Red Tourism Network.
- Famous bronze ware of the Warring States period. The top is a plate, and the bottom is three wheels, which can be dragged. The front wheel is decorated with the heads of two beasts. It is very unusual in shape. Full height 15.8 cm. Bronze ware belongs to the late Spring and Autumn periods. Unearthed in 1957, Yancheng, Wujin County, Jiangsu Province. Now in the National Museum of China. The structure of this plate is fine and ingenious, which is an artifact with strong regional style and times characteristics in Wu-Yue bronzes.
- In the early summer of 1958, a canoe was found here when villagers of Yancheng were collecting mud and fertilizer. Three canoes were unearthed successively from Yancheng. Two canoes, 11 meters long and 4.2 meters long, are in the Museum of Chinese History and the Nanjing Museum, respectively, and the other two are in the Wujin Yancheng Museum. According to research, canoe basswood cut to barbecue confirm the method of making the ancient "Ku wooden boat." The 11-meter-long canoe is the most complete and oldest canoe discovered in China and is known as "the first boat globally."

== See also ==
Some other similar attractions in Changzhou:

- China Dinosaur Park
- Hongmei Park
- Tianning Temple
- World Joyland
