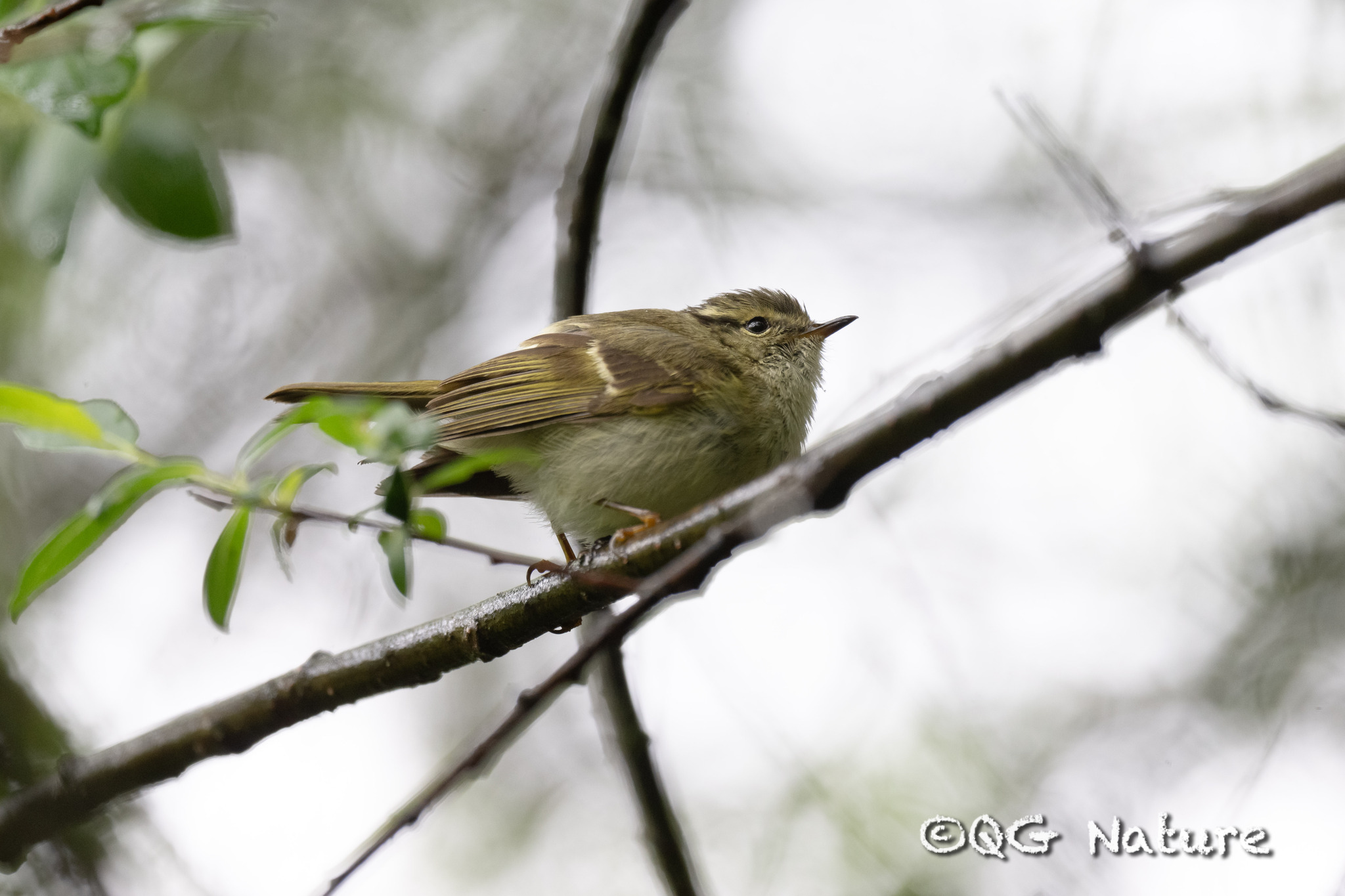

Conservation status
- Least Concern (IUCN 3.1)

Scientific classification
- Kingdom: Animalia
- Phylum: Chordata
- Class: Aves
- Order: Passeriformes
- Family: Phylloscopidae
- Genus: Phylloscopus
- Species: P. forresti

Binomial name
- Phylloscopus forresti Rothschild, 1921

= Sichuan leaf warbler =

Species of bird

Near Qingxi, Sichuan

The Sichuan leaf warbler (Phylloscopus forresti) is a species of leaf warbler found in central China. Its natural habitats are subtropical or tropical moist lowland forests and heavily degraded former forest.
