= Sky Scrapper =

Roller coaster

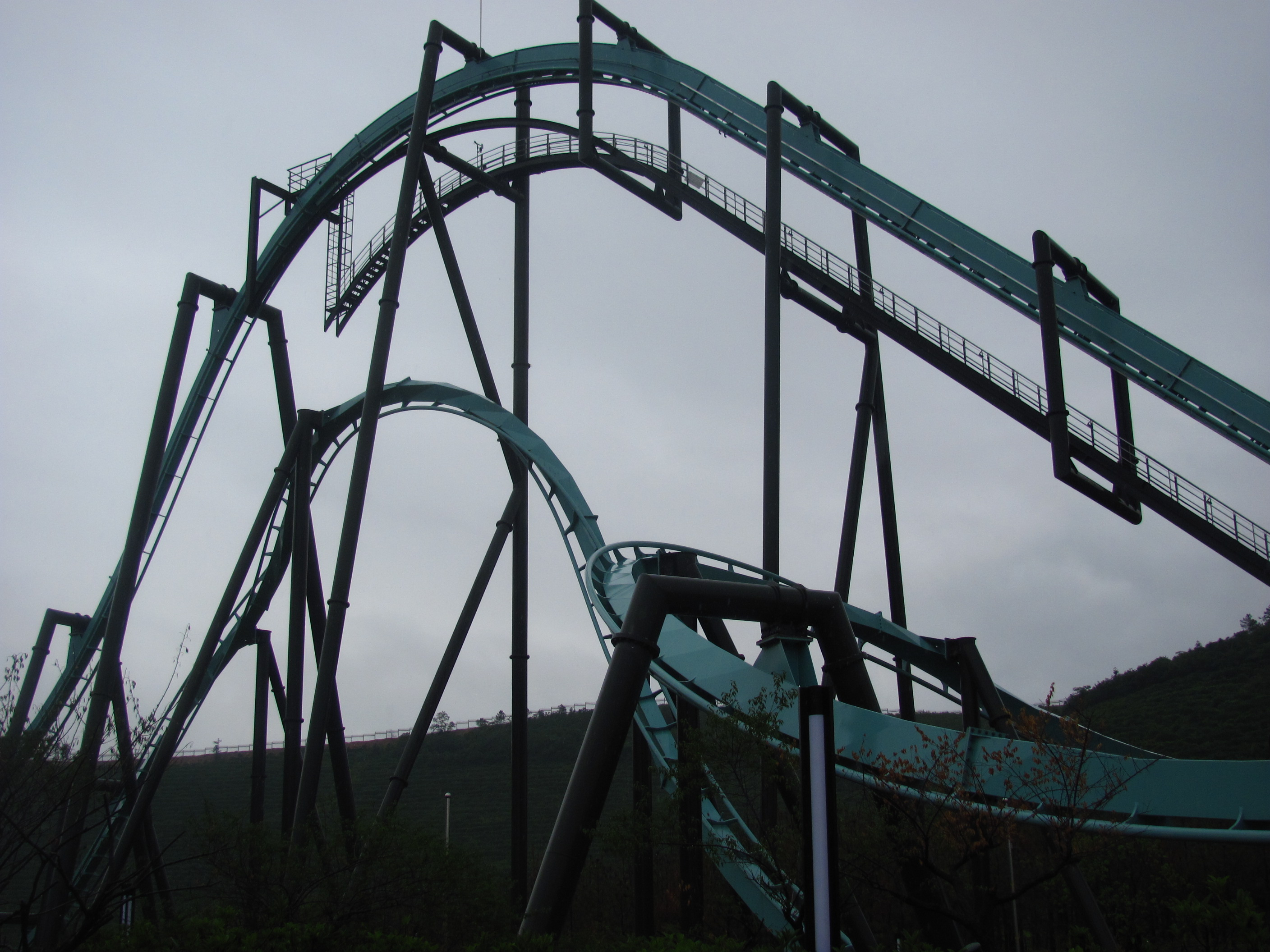
- The lift hill and zero-g roll of Sky Scrapper

World Joyland
- Location: World Joyland
- Park section: Universe of Starship
- Coordinates: 31.4975°N 120.0411°E
- Status: Operating
- Opening date: April 30, 2011

General statistics
- Type: Steel – Flying
- Manufacturer: Bolliger & Mabillard
- Model: Flying Coaster – Custom
- Lift/launch system: Chain lift hill
- Height: 131.3 ft (40.0 m)
- Drop: 104.3 ft (31.8 m)
- Length: 2,805.1 ft (855.0 m)
- Speed: 54.7 mph (88.0 km/h)
- Inversions: 5
- Duration: 2:06
- G-force: 3.3
- Height restriction: 140 cm (4 ft 7 in)
- Trains: 2 trains with 7 cars. Riders are arranged 4 across in a single row for a total of 28 riders per train.
- Sky Scrapper at RCDB

Sky Scrapper (also known as Starry Sky Ripper) is a flying roller coaster at World Joyland in Wujin, Changzhou, Jiangsu, China. Sky Scrapper was one of World Joyland's opening day attractions, officially opening on April 30, 2011. The 2,805.1-foot-long (855.0 m) ride stands 131.3 feet (40.0 m) tall, and features a top speed of 54.7 mph (88.0 km/h). Designed by Swiss firm Bolliger & Mabillard, Sky Scrapper restrains riders in the prone position and features five inversions.

== History ==
World Joyland officially opened to the public on April 4, 2011. The park opened with the custom-designed Sky Scrapper, a Flying Coaster model from Bolliger & Mabillard. The ride is located in the Universe of Starship area of the park. The park is derived from the World of Warcraft and StarCraft franchises.

== Characteristics ==
The roller coaster's steel track is approximately 2,805 feet (855 m) in length and the height of the lift is 131.3 feet (40.0 m). Sky Scrapper operates with two steel and fiberglass trains. Each train has seven cars that seat four riders in a single row, for a total of 28 riders per train.

Sky Scrapper features a total of five inversions, which ties it with The Flying Dinosaur for the most inversions on a B&M Flying Coaster model. These include a zero-g roll, a vertical loop, a "Lie to Fly"/"Fly to Lie" pair, and two inline twists. A "Lie to Fly" element is when riders are on their backs, facing the sky and they are flipped and face the ground. A "Fly to Lie" element is the opposite. As of August 2013, Sky Scrapper is the only Bolliger & Mabillard Flying Coaster to feature a vertical loop, and is one of only two to feature a zero-g roll.

== Experience ==
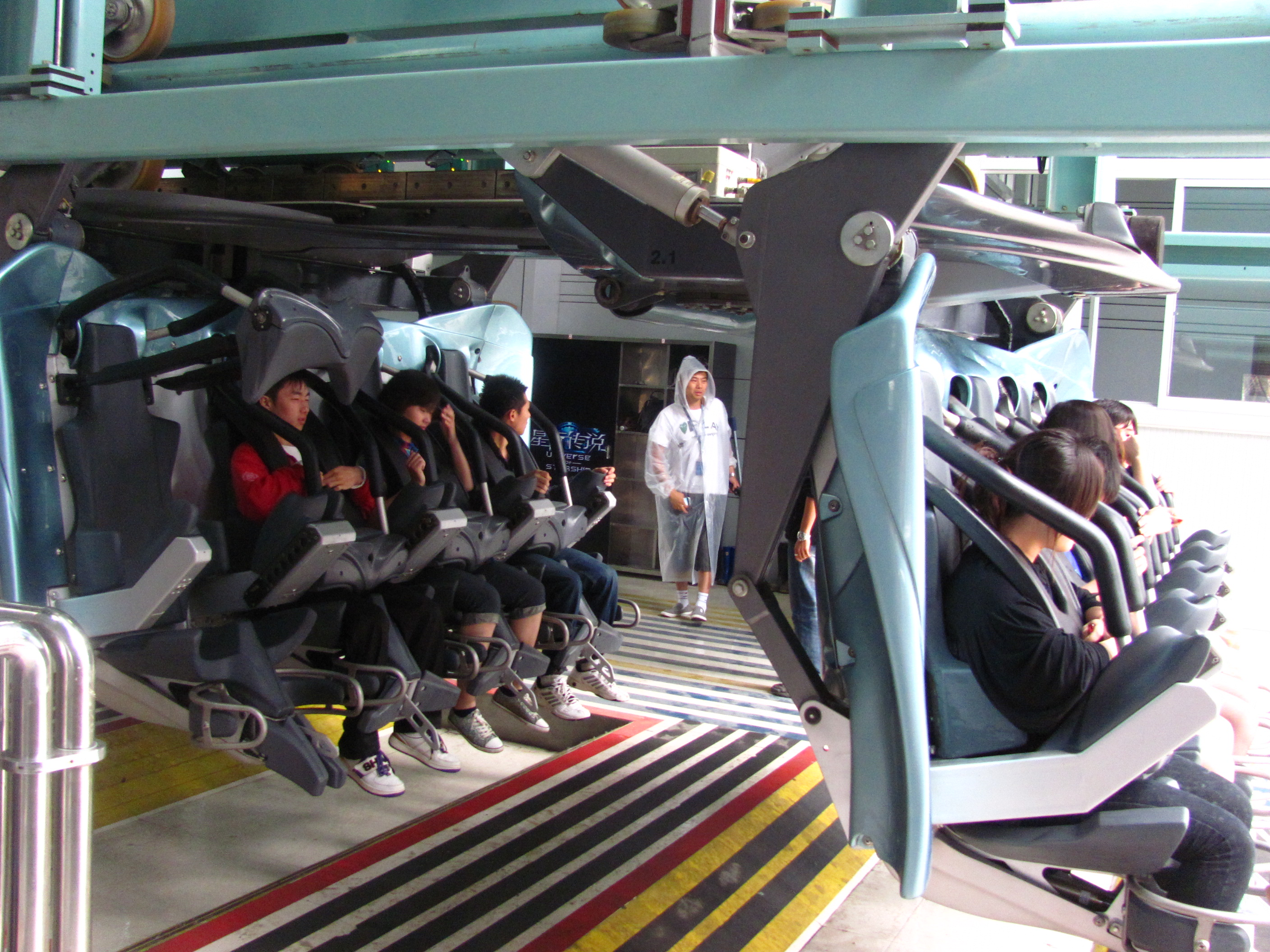
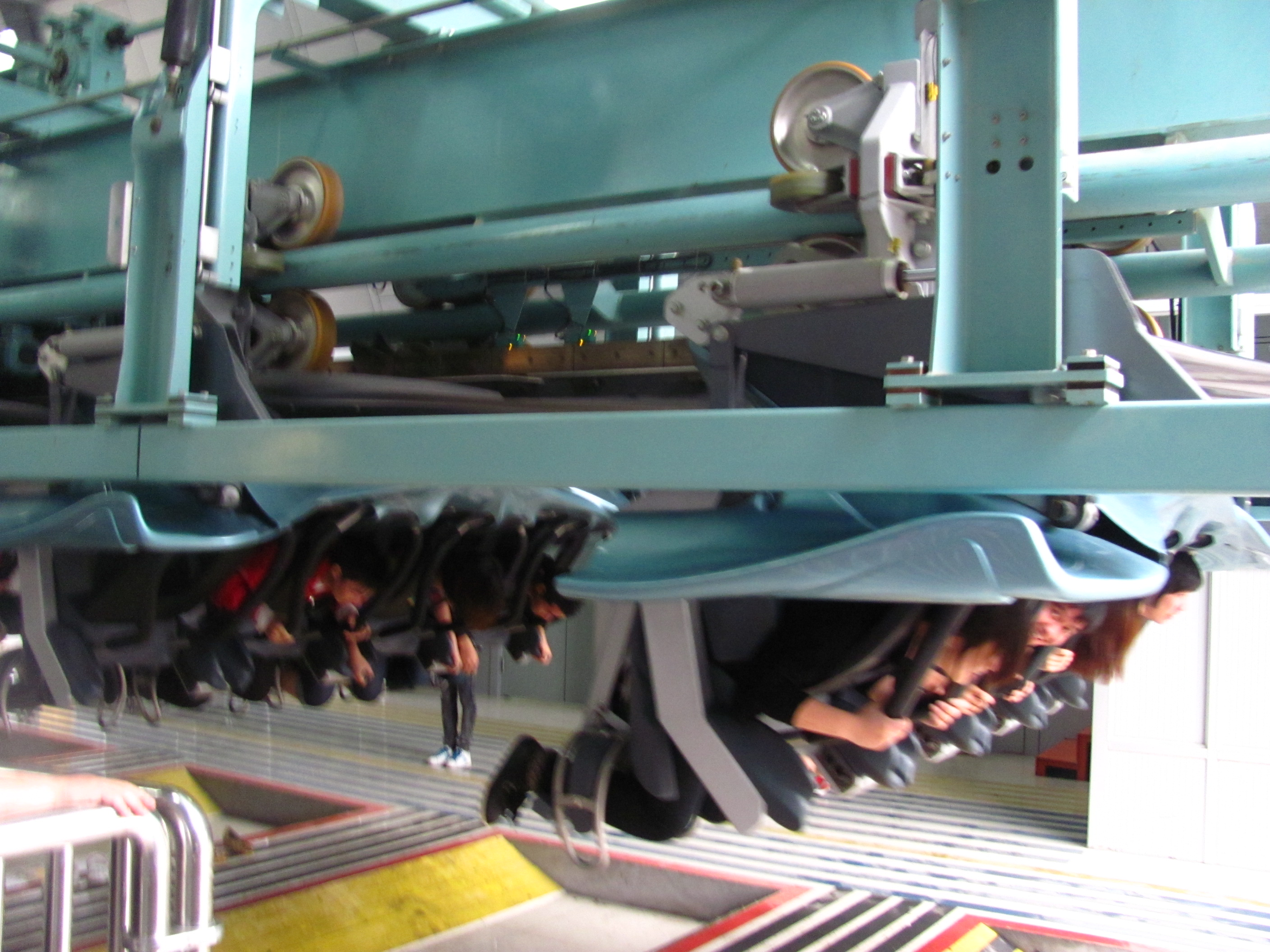
A train in the loading position (left) and flying position (right)

=== Station and loading ===
Once in the station, riders of Sky Scrapper board a train sitting down, in a similar style to inverted roller coasters. Riders are restrained through a padded over-the-shoulder harness and a lap bar. At the ankles, two flaps hold the legs in position and close as the harness is locked in place. After the train is fully locked and checked, the trains are raised into the flying position and depart the station.

=== Ride layout ===
The train travels out of the station and up the 131.3-foot (40.0 m) lift hill. The train then drops, reaching a top speed of 55 mph (89 km/h) before entering an overbanked turn. This is followed by a zero-g roll and "Fly-to-Lie" element that turns riders from a face-down prone position to a face-up lying position. It then goes through a small tunnel and enters the vertical loop. Riders are then transitioned back to a prone position after entering the following "Lie-to-Fly" element, which travels over water. Riders then experience a double inline twist element, and a helix that turns to the left. The train enters the final brake run and follows a short path back to the station.

== See also ==
- 2011 in amusement parks
