= Yurun, Qinghai =

Yurun 雨润镇
- Town
- Yurunzhen
- Location in Qinghai
- Coordinates: 36°29′19″N 102°17′18″E
- Country: People's Republic of China
- Province: Qinghai
- Autonomous prefecture: Haidong
- County: Ledu County

Area
  - Total: 102 km^{2} (39 sq mi)

Population (2010)
  - Total: 14,515
  - Density: 142/km^{2} (369/sq mi)
- Time zone: UTC+8 (China Standard)
- Local dialing code: 972

Yurun (Mandarin: 雨润镇) is a town in Ledu District, Haidong, Qinghai, China. In 2010, Yurun had a total population of 14,515: 7,335 males and 7,180 females: 2,498 aged under 14, 10,877 aged between 15 and 65 and 1,140 aged over 65.
