= Qutan, Qinghai =

Qutan 瞿昙镇
- Town
- Qutanzhen
- Location in Qinghai
- Coordinates: 36°21′13″N 102°17′52″E
- Country: People's Republic of China
- Province: Qinghai
- Autonomous prefecture: Haidong
- County: Ledu County

Area
  - Total: 263.1 km^{2} (101.6 sq mi)

Population (2010)
  - Total: 18,601
  - Density: 70.70/km^{2} (183.1/sq mi)
- Time zone: UTC+8 (China Standard)
- Local dialing code: 972

Qutan (Mandarin: 瞿昙镇) is a town in Ledu District, Haidong, Qinghai, China. In 2010, Qutan had a total population of 18,601: 9,672 males and 8,929 females: 3,367 aged under 14, 13,829 aged between 15 and 65 and 1,405 aged over 65.
