= Wujin Star Experimental school =

Middle school in Changzhou City, China

The Star Experimental School (Chinese: 星辰实验学校) is a middle school in Wujin District, Changzhou City, Jiangsu Province. It was founded in 2000. It is located in Wujin Nww Town, and it covers an area of 110 Mu. The area of structure is 75 thousand square meters. Now, the school has 76 teaching classes, more than 400 faculty and staff, and over 3900 students. The Star Experimental School is the first private school in Wujin District and the first boarding school which implements the 9-year System. In education and management practice, The Star Experimental School always adheres to the "people-oriented" educational philosophy. It insists in developing and exploring the educational mode which is suitable for the development of students, the management system suitable for teachers and the culture suitable for the development of the school. The motto of The Star Experimental School is "Strict and Free" ("严格而自由").
