= Gaodian, Qinghai =

Gaodian 高店镇
- Town
- Gaodianzhen
- Location in Qinghai
- Coordinates: 36°28′50″N 102°12′19″E
- Country: People's Republic of China
- Province: Qinghai
- Autonomous prefecture: Haidong
- County: Ledu County

Area
  - Total: 46.15 km^{2} (17.82 sq mi)

Population (2010)
  - Total: 8,388
  - Density: 181.8/km^{2} (470.7/sq mi)
- Time zone: UTC+8 (China Standard)
- Local dialing code: 972

Gaodian (Mandarin: 高店镇) is a town in Ledu District, Haidong, Qinghai, China. In 2010, Gaodian had a total population of 8,388: 4,232 males and 4,156 females: 1,402 aged under 14, 6,299 aged between 15 and 65 and 687 aged over 65.
