= Muyu, Sichuan =

Muyu 木鱼镇
- Town
- Location in Sichuan
- Coordinates: 32°38′8″N 105°24′12″E
- Country: People's Republic of China
- Autonomous Region: Sichuan
- Prefecture-level city: Guangyuan
- County: Qingchuan County
- Time zone: UTC+8 (China Standard)

Muyu (Chinese: 木鱼; pinyin: Mùyú) is a town of Qingchuan County, Sichuan, China. As of 2020, it administers three residential neighborhoods and five villages:

Neighborhoods

- Shiniu Community (石牛社区)
- Wenwu Community (文武社区)
- Hongqi Community (红旗社区)

Villages

- Muyu Village
- Tielu Village (铁炉村)
- Banqiao Village (板桥村)
- Qianshan Village (前山村)
- Xinba Village (新坝村)
