= Qingxi, Sichuan =

Qingxi 青溪镇
- Town
- Qingxizhen
- Location in Sichuan
- Coordinates: 32°27′27″N 104°50′12″E
- Country: People's Republic of China
- Province: Sichuan
- Autonomous prefecture: Guangyuan
- County: Qingchuan County

Area
  - Total: 267.7 km^{2} (103.4 sq mi)

Population (2010)
  - Total: 13,984
  - Density: 52.24/km^{2} (135.3/sq mi)
- Time zone: UTC+8 (China Standard)

Qingxi (Mandarin: 青溪镇) is a town in Qingchuan County, Guangyuan, Sichuan, China. In 2010, it had a population of 13,984: 7,131 males and 6,853 females, 2,122 aged under 14, 10,455 aged between 15 and 65 and 1,407 aged over 65.
