= Ge Lake =

Lake in Jiangsu, China

- He Hu
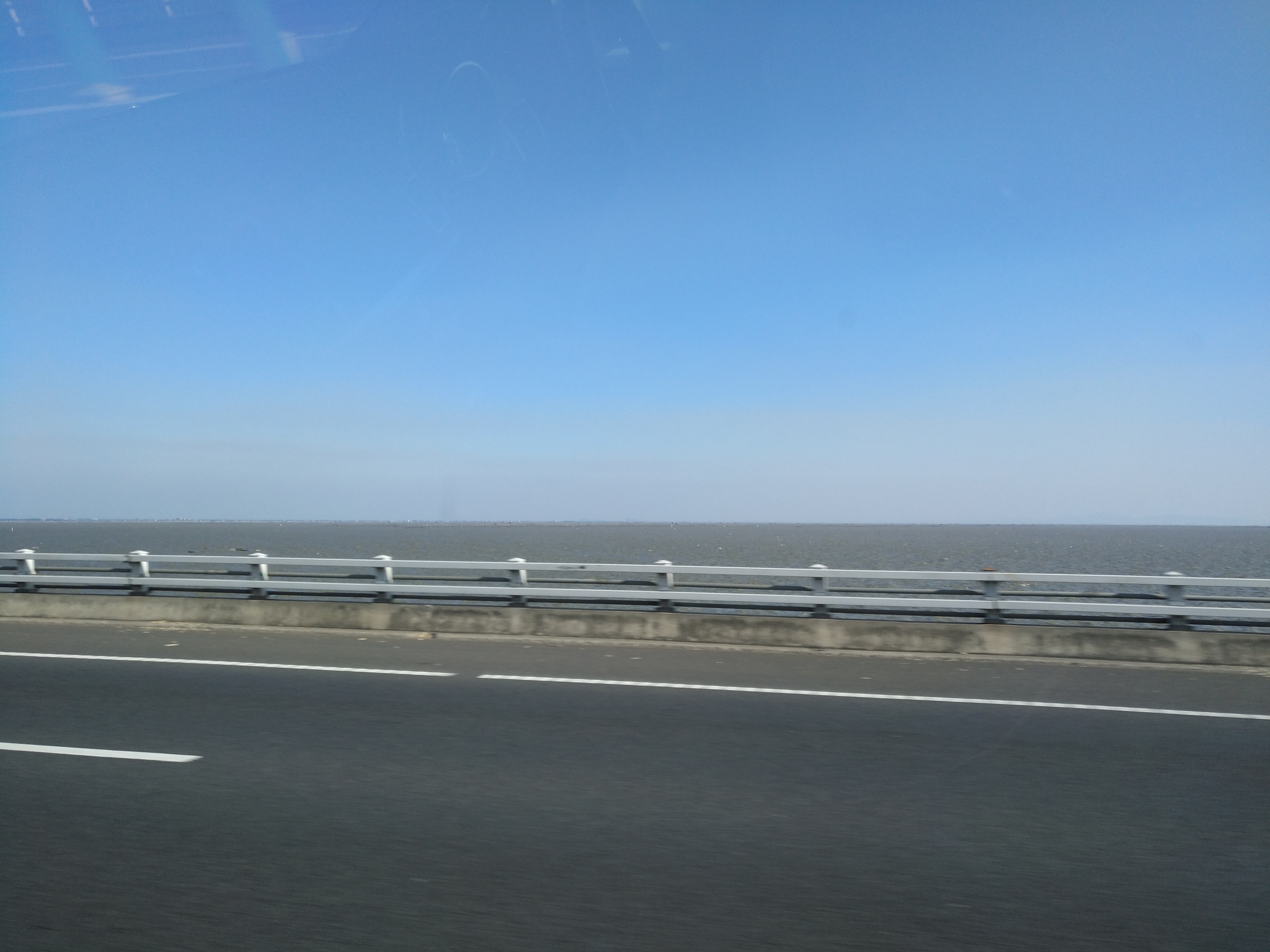
- Ge Lake, taken from S38 Changhe Expressway

- Location in Jiangsu
- Location: Yixing and Wujin District; Jiangsu
- Coordinates: 31°35′20″N 119°47′48″E
- Lake type: Fresh water lake
- Basin countries: China
- Max. length: 22.1 km (14 mi)
- Max. width: 9 km (6 mi)
- Surface area: 146.5 km^{2} (100 sq mi)
- Average depth: 1.19 m (4 ft)
- Max. depth: 1.9 m (6 ft)
- Water volume: 174×10^{6} m^{3} (6.1×10^{9} cu ft)
- Surface elevation: 3.24 m (11 ft)

Ge Lake (Chinese: 滆湖; pinyin: Gé Hú) is a freshwater lake in the south of Jiangsu Province, China, northwest of Lake Tai. The lake has a total area of about 146.5 square kilometers. The average depth is 1.19 m, the water storage capacity is about 1.74×10^{8}m^{3}.
