= Qianhuang, Jiangsu =

Qianhuang 前黄镇
- Town
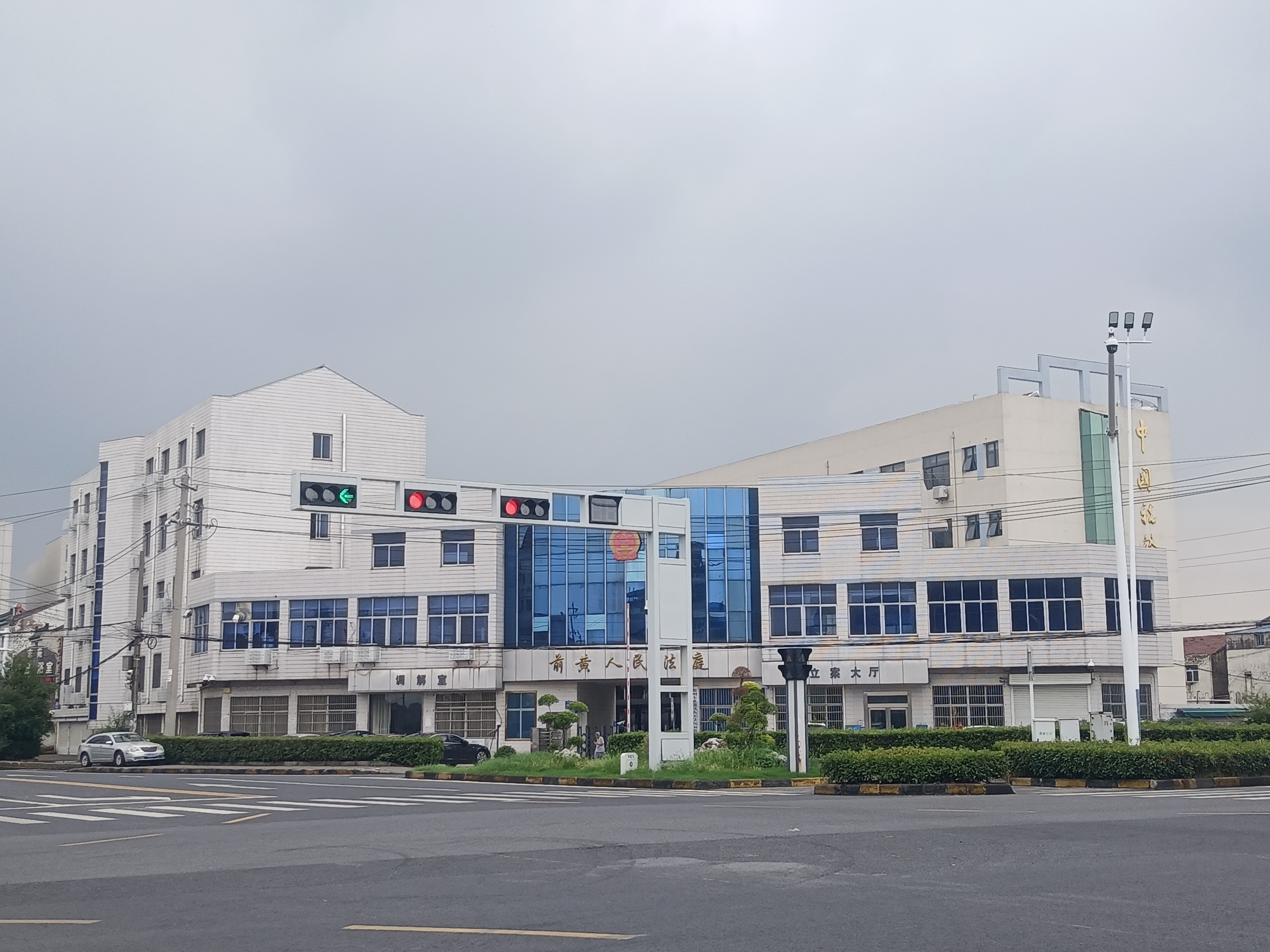

- Location in Jiangsu
- Coordinates: 31°35′48″N 119°57′28″E
- Country: People's Republic of China
- Province: Jiangsu
- Prefecture-level city: Changzhou
- District: Wujin District
- Time zone: UTC+8 (China Standard)

Qianhuang (Chinese: 前黄) is a town located south of Changzhou city, in the southern Jiangsu province of China. It is 8 kilometers away from Wujin District which administers it. As of 2018, it has 20 villages under its administration. To the east of Qianhuang is Wuxi, a national tourist resort, and it is 15 kilometers away from Yixing, a famous pottery city.

Qianhuang is the central area between Ge Lake and Lake Tai. Qianhuang has convenient transportation. The Provincial line of China runs through Qianhuang. It also has the new long-distance railway linking Jiangsu and Zhejiang Provinces, and the Wuyi highway, the main road in Changzhou.
