= Chaotian, Guangyuan =

Chaotian 朝天区
- District
- Location in Sichuan
- Coordinates: 32°38′56″N 105°53′20″E
- Country: China
- Province: Sichuan
- Prefecture-level city: Guangyuan
- District seat: Chaotian Town (朝天镇)

Area
  - Total: 1,618 km^{2} (625 sq mi)
- Elevation: 553 m (1,814 ft)
- Highest elevation: 1,998 m (6,555 ft)
- Lowest elevation: 475 m (1,558 ft)

Population (2022)
  - Total: 210,000
  - Density: 130/km^{2} (340/sq mi)
- Time zone: UTC+8 (China Standard)
- Area code: 0839
- Website: www.gyct.gov.cn

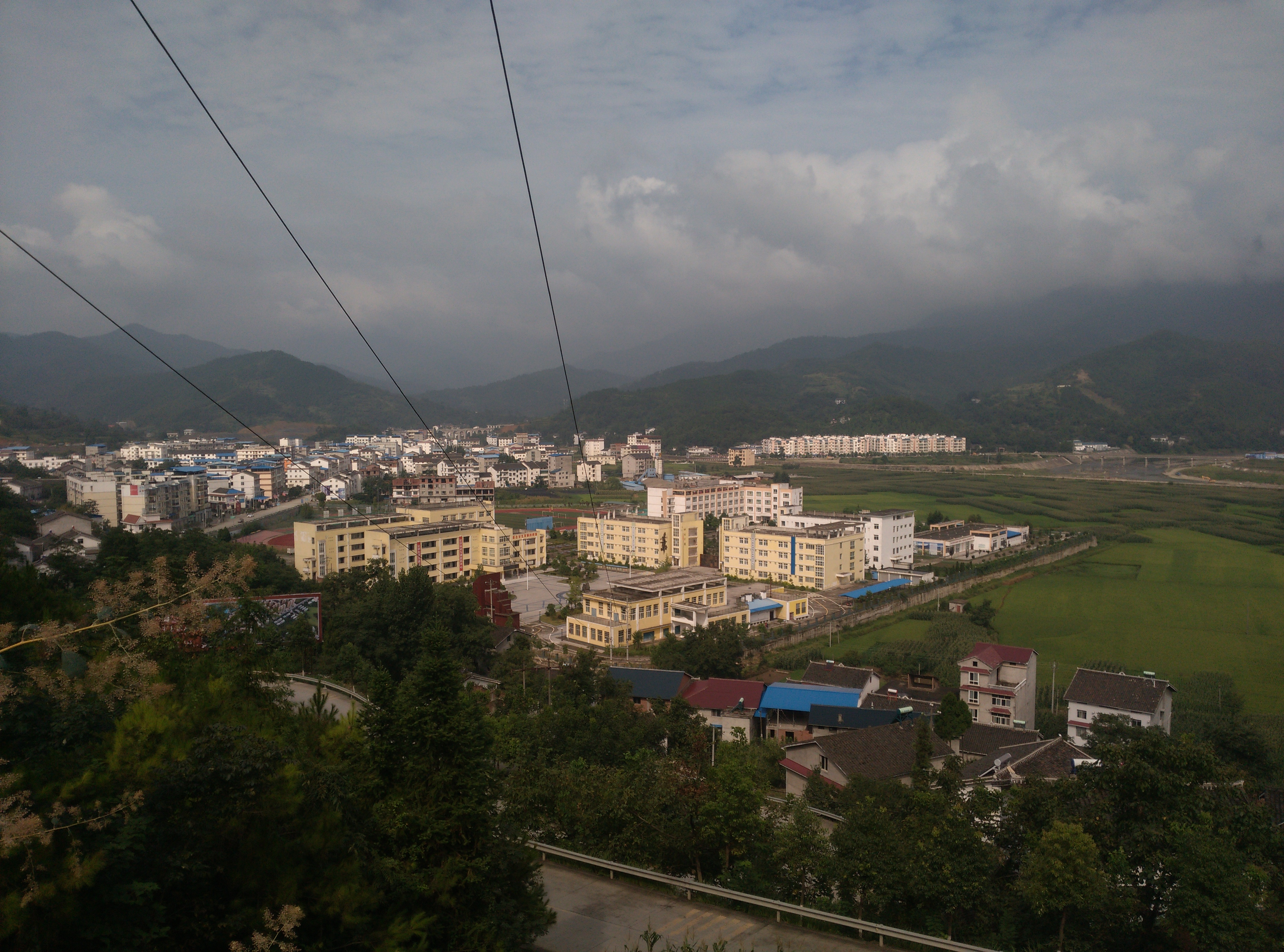

Chaotian (Chinese: 朝天; pinyin: Cháotiān) is a northern, mostly rural, county-level district of Guangyuan, Sichuan Province, China. The region was part of Shizhong District prior to its establishment as a district in 1989.

Tourist attractions in Chaotian include the Mingyue Gorge and Longmenge cave. Walnuts are cultivated widely in Chaotian.

== Administrative divisions ==
Chaotian governs over 10 towns and 2 townships.

Towns

- Chaotian 朝天镇
- Datan 大滩镇
- Yangmu 羊木镇
- Zengjia 曾家镇
- Zhongzi 中子镇
- Shahe 沙河镇
- Lianghekou 两河口镇
- Yunwushan 云雾山镇
- Shuimogou 水磨沟镇
- Lijia 李家镇

Townships

- Maliu 麻柳乡
- Linxi 临溪乡
