= Xiaying Township, Qinghai =

Zongtar Tibetan Township 下营藏族乡 ཙོང་ཐར་བོད་རིགས་ཞང་། Xiaying
- Ethnic township
- Location in Qinghai
- Coordinates: 36°23′18″N 102°8′37″E
- Country: China
- Province: Qinghai
- Prefecture-level city: Haidong
- District: Ledu

Area
  - Total: 72.35 km^{2} (27.93 sq mi)

Population (2010)
  - Total: 3,635
  - Density: 50.24/km^{2} (130.1/sq mi)
- Time zone: UTC+8 (China Standard)
- Local dialing code: 972

Zongtar Tibetan Ethnic Township or Xiaying Township (Tibetan: ཙོང་ཐར་བོད་རིགས་ཞང་།, Chinese: 下营藏族乡) is an ethnic township in Ledu District, Haidong, Qinghai, China. In 2010, Zongtar Township had a total population of 3,635: 1,881 males and 1,754 females: 692 aged under 14, 2,533 aged between 15 and 65 and 410 aged over 65.
