= Qingchuan County =

Qingchuan County 青川县
- County
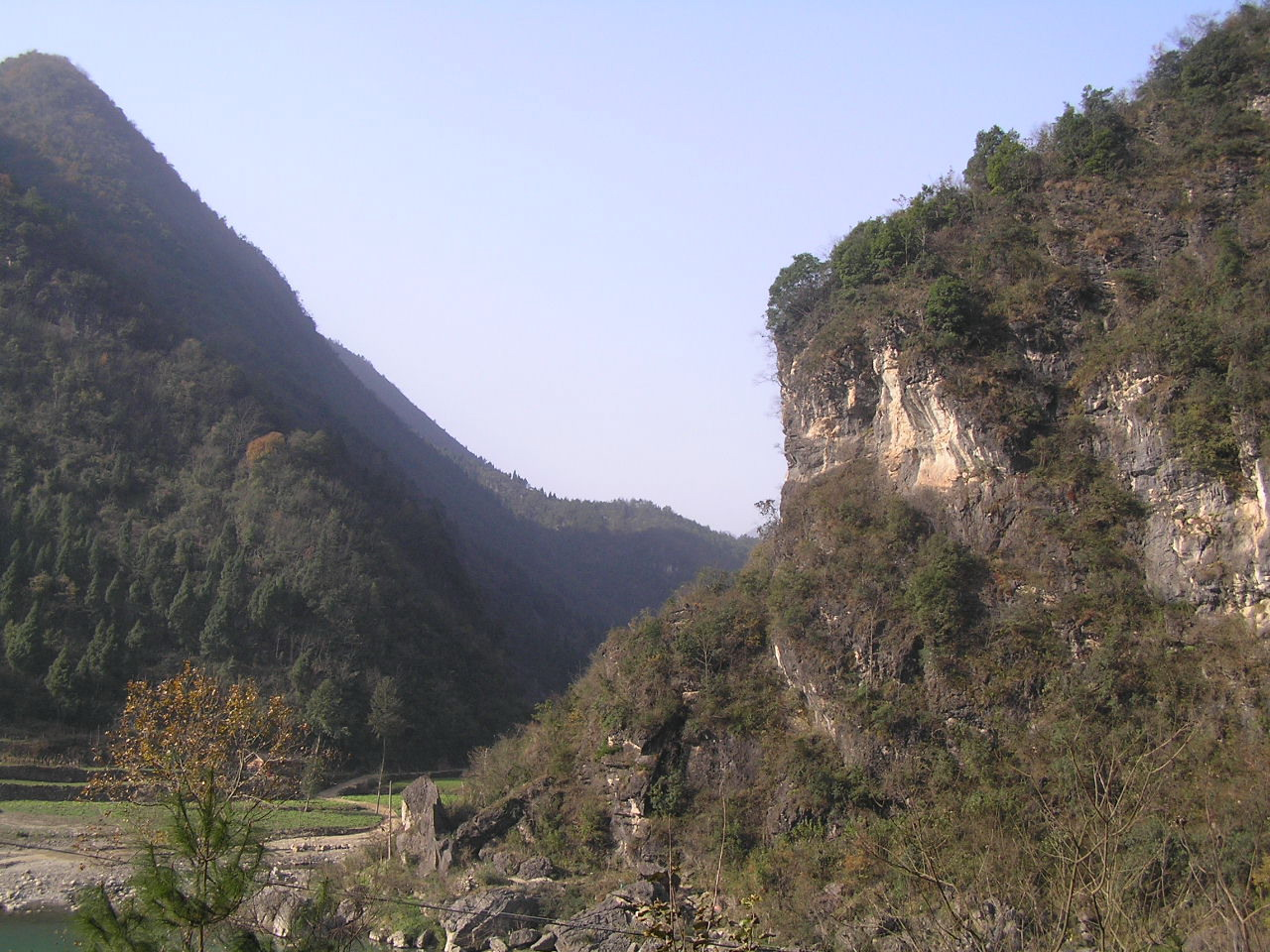

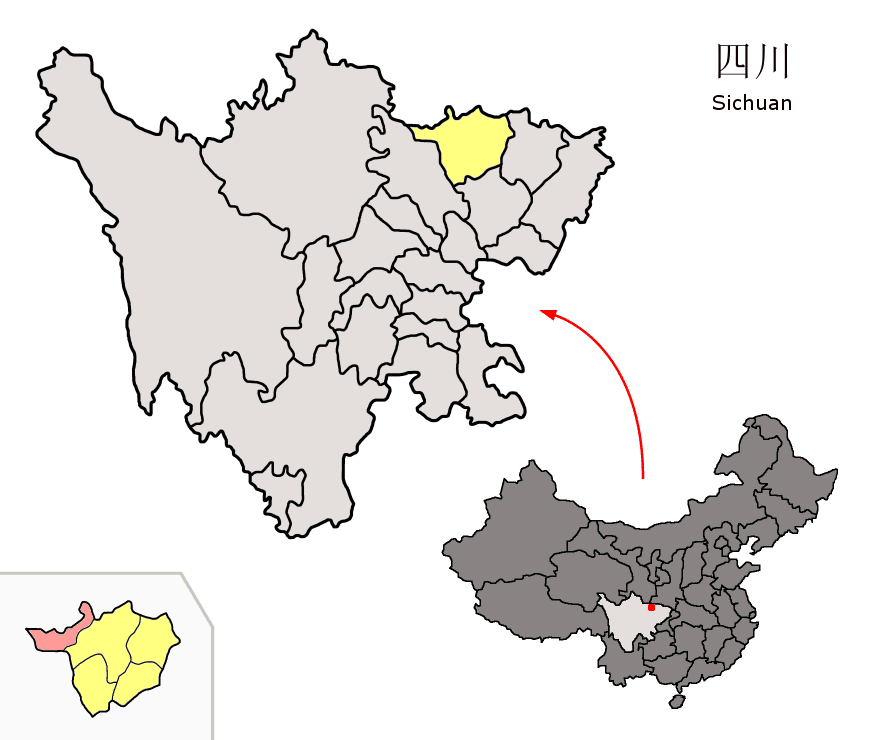
- Location of Qingchuan County (red) and Guangyuan (yellow) within Sichuan
- Coordinates: 32°34′30″N 105°14′20″E
- Country: China
- Province: Sichuan
- Prefecture-level city: Guangyuan
- County seat: Qiaozhuang (乔庄镇)

Area
  - Total: 3,269 km^{2} (1,262 sq mi)

Population (2020 census)
  - Total: 156,387
  - Density: 47.84/km^{2} (123.9/sq mi)
- Time zone: UTC+8 (China Standard)
- Postal code: 648100
- Area code: 0839
- Website: www.cnqc.gov.cn

Qingchuan County (Chinese: 青川县; pinyin: Qīngchuān Xiàn) is a county in the northeast of Sichuan province, China, bordering the provinces of Gansu to the north and Shaanxi to the northeast. It is the westernmost county-level division of the prefecture-level city of Guangyuan. It has an area of 3269 square kilometers and a population of 156,387, including Han Chinese as well as Hui people.

== Administrative divisions ==
Qingchuan has 12 towns, 6 townships, and 2 Ethnic townships:

Towns

- Qiaozhuang (乔庄镇)
- Qingxi (青溪镇)
- Fangshi (房石镇)
- Guanzhuang (关庄镇)
- Liangshui (凉水镇)
- Zhuyuan (竹园镇)
- Muyu (木鱼镇)
- Shazhou (沙州镇)
- Yaodu (姚渡镇)
- Sanguo (三锅镇)
- Jianfeng (建峰镇)
- Le'an (乐安镇)

Townships

- Chaba (茶坝乡)
- Quhe (曲河乡)
- Shiba (石坝乡)
- Qifo (七佛乡)
- Qima (骑马乡)
- Guanyindian (观音店乡)

Ethnic townships

- Dayuan Hui Ethnic Township (大院回族乡)
- Haoxi Hui Ethnic Township (蒿溪回族乡)

Other

- Tangjiahe National Nature Reserve (唐家河国家级自然保护区)

== Climate ==
Climate data for Qingchuan, elevation 782 m (2,566 ft), (1991–2020 normals, extremes 1981–present)
Month	Jan	Feb	Mar	Apr	May	Jun	Jul	Aug	Sep	Oct	Nov	Dec	Year
Record high °C (°F)	18.1 (64.6)	24.1 (75.4)	29.4 (84.9)	31.8 (89.2)	34.1 (93.4)	36.3 (97.3)	37.1 (98.8)	36.0 (96.8)	34.4 (93.9)	28.3 (82.9)	24.1 (75.4)	18.0 (64.4)	37.1 (98.8)
Mean daily maximum °C (°F)	7.9 (46.2)	10.6 (51.1)	15.6 (60.1)	21.6 (70.9)	25.3 (77.5)	27.9 (82.2)	29.3 (84.7)	28.7 (83.7)	23.5 (74.3)	18.8 (65.8)	14.1 (57.4)	9.2 (48.6)	19.4 (66.9)
Daily mean °C (°F)	3.0 (37.4)	5.6 (42.1)	9.9 (49.8)	15.0 (59.0)	18.8 (65.8)	21.9 (71.4)	23.7 (74.7)	23.1 (73.6)	19.0 (66.2)	14.4 (57.9)	9.3 (48.7)	4.2 (39.6)	14.0 (57.2)
Mean daily minimum °C (°F)	−0.5 (31.1)	2.1 (35.8)	5.7 (42.3)	10.2 (50.4)	14.0 (57.2)	17.4 (63.3)	19.9 (67.8)	19.6 (67.3)	16.2 (61.2)	11.8 (53.2)	6.2 (43.2)	0.8 (33.4)	10.3 (50.5)
Record low °C (°F)	−8.2 (17.2)	−6.6 (20.1)	−5.3 (22.5)	−0.2 (31.6)	5.2 (41.4)	9.5 (49.1)	14.0 (57.2)	12.0 (53.6)	8.0 (46.4)	−0.3 (31.5)	−4.3 (24.3)	−8.2 (17.2)	−8.2 (17.2)
Average precipitation mm (inches)	8.0 (0.31)	10.9 (0.43)	24.2 (0.95)	49.5 (1.95)	99.2 (3.91)	120.3 (4.74)	252.1 (9.93)	214.6 (8.45)	156.2 (6.15)	65.1 (2.56)	18.6 (0.73)	5.4 (0.21)	1,024.1 (40.32)
Average precipitation days (≥ 0.1 mm)	6.6	7.3	9.8	11.1	13.4	13.8	15.1	14.8	16.4	14.4	8.3	4.7	135.7
Average snowy days	4.9	2.8	0.4	0.1	0	0	0	0	0	0	0.2	1.5	9.9
Average relative humidity (%)	73	72	71	72	73	78	82	84	86	85	81	75	78
Mean monthly sunshine hours	80.6	67.6	90.5	118.6	137.3	124.0	135.0	129.4	66.4	66.2	73.8	84.3	1,173.7
Percentage possible sunshine	25	22	24	30	32	29	31	32	18	19	24	27	26
Source: China Meteorological Administration
