= Qishuyan District =

Qishuyan 戚墅堰区
- District
- Location in Jiangsu
- Coordinates: 31°44′44″N 120°02′38″E
- Country: People's Republic of China
- Province: Jiangsu
- Prefecture-level city: Changzhou

Area
  - Total: 31.58 km^{2} (12.19 sq mi)

Population (2005)
  - Total: 80,200
  - Density: 2,540/km^{2} (6,580/sq mi)
- Time zone: UTC+8 (China Standard)
- Postal code: 213011

Qishuyan District (simplified Chinese: 戚墅堰区; traditional Chinese: 戚墅堰區; pinyin: Qīshùyàn Qū) was a district of the city of Changzhou in Jiangsu, China. The local language is the Changzhou dialect of Wu Chinese. The postal code for the district is 213011. It covers an area of 31.58 square kilometers. In 2005 the total population was recorded at 80,200 people. It is also home to Tianmu Lake after which a local beer is named. On May 7, 2015, Qishuyan was merged into Wujin District.
