= Ledu, Haidong =

Ledu 乐都区
- District
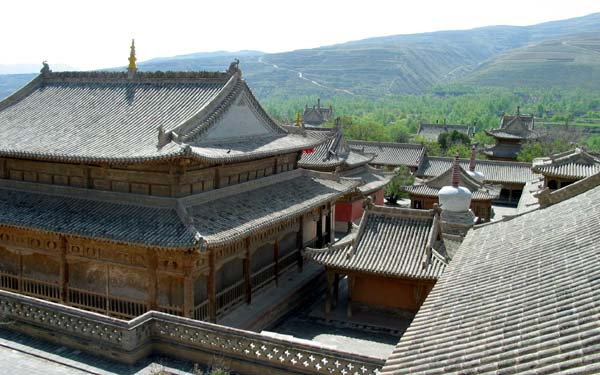
- Qutan Si Monastery

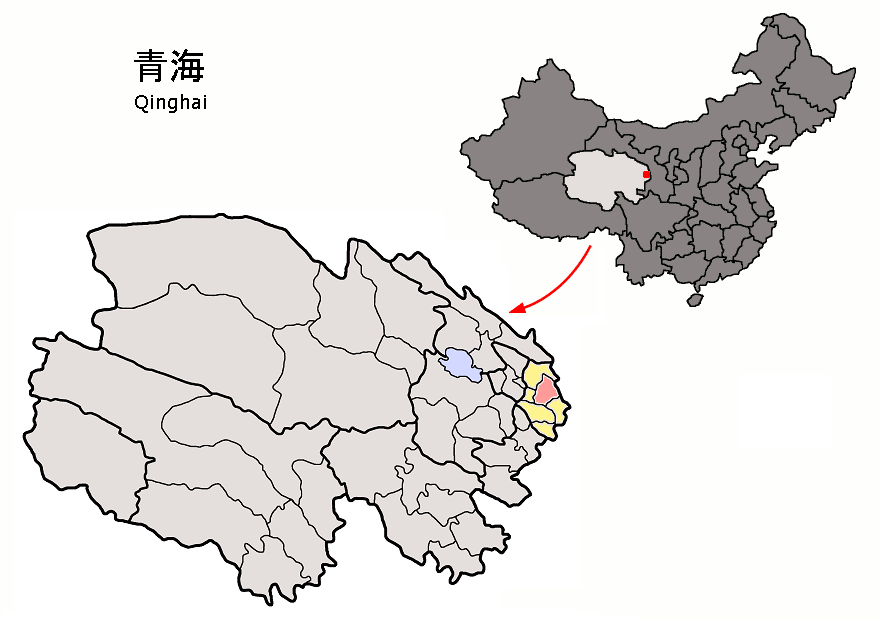
- Location of Ledu District (red) in Haidong City (yellow) and Qinghai province
- Coordinates: 36°31′N 102°25′E
- Country: China
- Province: Qinghai
- Prefecture-level city: Haidong
- Seat: Nianbo Subdistrict

Area
  - Total: 3,050 km^{2} (1,180 sq mi)

Population (2020)
  - Total: 240,949
  - Density: 79.0/km^{2} (205/sq mi)
- Time zone: UTC+8 (China Standard)
- Website: www.ledu.gov.cn

Ledu, Haidong

Chinese name
- Simplified Chinese: 乐都区
- Traditional Chinese: 樂都區
Transcriptions
Standard Mandarin
- Hanyu Pinyin: Lèdū Qū

Tibetan name
- Tibetan: གྲོ་ཚང་ཁུལ།
Transcriptions
- Wylie: gro tshang khul

Ledu District (Chinese: 乐都区; Tibetan: གྲོ་ཚང) is a district of the city of Haidong, Qinghai province, China. Nearby are Ping'an District and the city of Xining. Ledu used to be named Nianbo county before 1929. The county dates back to 1724. On 8 February 2013 Ledu was upgraded from a county into a district.

Ledu District is served by the G6 Beijing–Lhasa Expressway.

== Subdivisions ==
Ledu District is divided into 2 subdistricts, 6 towns, 9 townships, and 3 ethnic townships:

- Nianbo Subdistrict (碾伯街道)
- Ganggou Subdistrict (岗沟街道)
- Yurun Town (雨润镇)
- Shoule Town (寿乐镇)
- Gaomiao Town (高庙镇)
- Hongshui Town (洪水镇)
- Gaodian Town (高店镇)
- Qutan Town (瞿昙镇)
- Gonghe Township (共和乡)
- Zhongling Township (中岭乡)
- Lijia Township (李家乡)
- Luhua Township (芦花乡)
- Maying Township (马营乡)
- Machang Township (马厂乡)
- Putai Township (蒲台乡)
- Fengdui Township (峰堆乡)
- Chengtai Township (城台乡)
- Zongtar Tibetan Ethnic Township (下营乡, ཙོང་ཐར་བོད་རིགས་ཞང་།)
- Zhungba Tibetan Ethnic Township (中坝乡, ཀྲུང་པ་བོད་རིགས་ཞང་།)
- Dara Tu Ethnic Township (达拉乡)

== Climate ==
Climate data for Ledu, Haidong, elevation 2,021 m (6,631 ft), (1991–2020 normals, extremes 1991–present)
Month	Jan	Feb	Mar	Apr	May	Jun	Jul	Aug	Sep	Oct	Nov	Dec	Year
Record high °C (°F)	17.3 (63.1)	19.6 (67.3)	28.5 (83.3)	31.0 (87.8)	32.5 (90.5)	33.6 (92.5)	38.4 (101.1)	35.2 (95.4)	30.5 (86.9)	28.1 (82.6)	21.8 (71.2)	16.7 (62.1)	38.4 (101.1)
Mean daily maximum °C (°F)	2.7 (36.9)	6.6 (43.9)	12.2 (54.0)	18.3 (64.9)	22.0 (71.6)	25.3 (77.5)	27.1 (80.8)	25.9 (78.6)	21.0 (69.8)	15.9 (60.6)	9.9 (49.8)	4.0 (39.2)	15.9 (60.6)
Daily mean °C (°F)	−5.5 (22.1)	−1.4 (29.5)	4.4 (39.9)	10.4 (50.7)	14.4 (57.9)	18.0 (64.4)	19.9 (67.8)	18.9 (66.0)	14.4 (57.9)	8.4 (47.1)	1.8 (35.2)	−4.1 (24.6)	8.3 (46.9)
Mean daily minimum °C (°F)	−11.6 (11.1)	−7.8 (18.0)	−1.8 (28.8)	3.6 (38.5)	7.9 (46.2)	11.8 (53.2)	14.1 (57.4)	13.7 (56.7)	9.6 (49.3)	3.1 (37.6)	−3.8 (25.2)	−9.9 (14.2)	2.4 (36.4)
Record low °C (°F)	−20.9 (−5.6)	−18.1 (−0.6)	−14.1 (6.6)	−6.6 (20.1)	−0.7 (30.7)	4.0 (39.2)	5.7 (42.3)	6.1 (43.0)	0.5 (32.9)	−6.7 (19.9)	−15.1 (4.8)	−20.9 (−5.6)	−20.9 (−5.6)
Average precipitation mm (inches)	1.2 (0.05)	1.8 (0.07)	7.1 (0.28)	15.0 (0.59)	42.3 (1.67)	50.3 (1.98)	69.5 (2.74)	71.2 (2.80)	52.1 (2.05)	20.7 (0.81)	2.9 (0.11)	0.8 (0.03)	334.9 (13.18)
Average precipitation days (≥ 0.1 mm)	2.4	2.9	4.8	5.7	9.8	13.0	13.2	12.3	12.6	7.0	2.6	1.8	88.1
Average snowy days	4.1	5.0	5.7	1.9	0.2	0	0	0	0	1.1	3.8	3.2	25
Average relative humidity (%)	47	45	44	44	52	57	61	64	69	64	55	51	54
Mean monthly sunshine hours	190.5	194.9	225.8	236.8	242.7	228.7	231.7	221.3	185.6	195.3	195.7	194.2	2,543.2
Percentage possible sunshine	61	63	60	60	55	52	52	54	51	57	65	65	58
Source: China Meteorological Administration

== See also ==
- Liuwan Museum of Ancient Painted Pottery
