= Lizhou, Guangyuan =

Coordinates: 32°26′02″N 105°50′43″E

Lizhou 利州区
- District
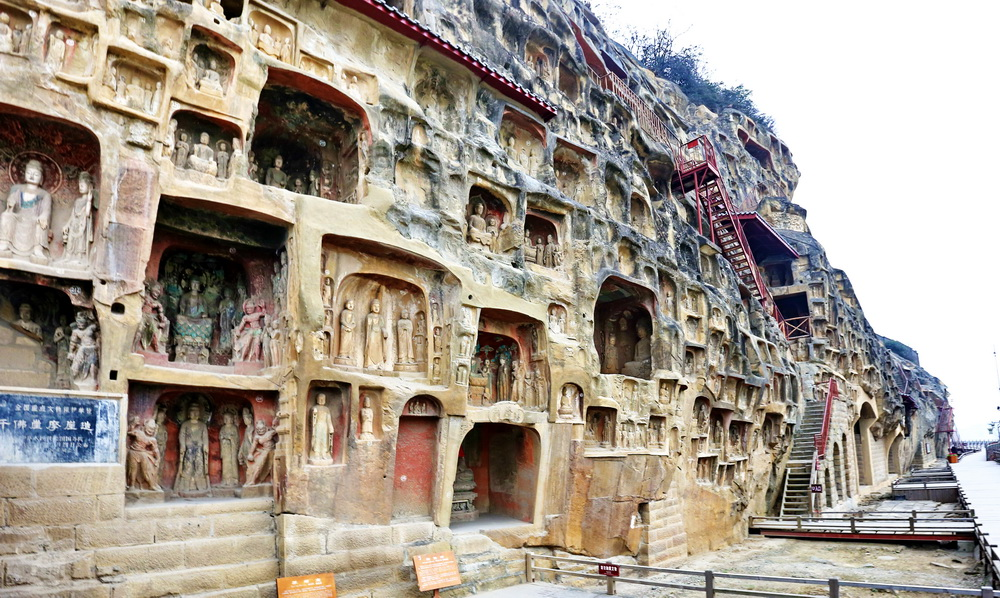

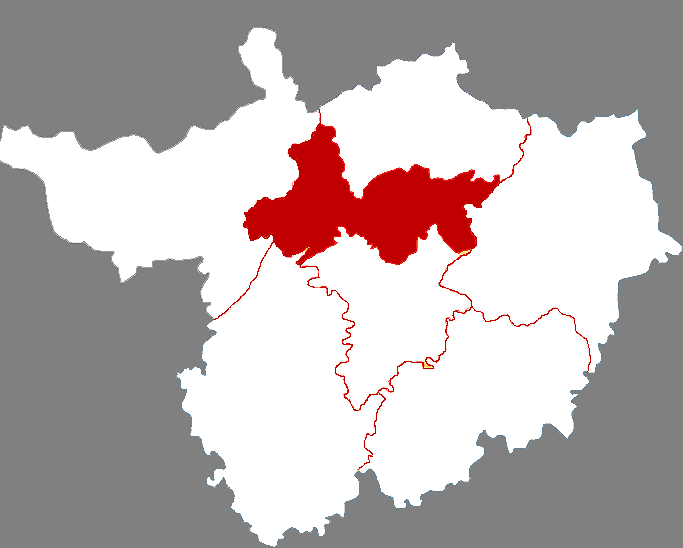
- Country: China
- Province: Sichuan
- Prefecture-level city: Guangyuan
- District seat: Dongba Subdistrict

Area
  - Total: 1,492 km^{2} (576 sq mi)

Population (2020)
  - Total: 621,978
  - Density: 416.9/km^{2} (1,080/sq mi)
- Time zone: UTC+8 (China Standard)
- Postal code: 628000
- Website: www.lzq.gov.cn

Lizhou District (Chinese: 利州区; pinyin: Lìzhōu Qū), known until 2007 as Shizhong District (市中区; Shìzhōng Qū), is a district of Guangyuan city, Sichuan Province, China. Lizhou is the former name of the city Guangyuan and encompasses the urban area of Guangyuan.

== Administrative divisions ==
Lizhou District administers 7 subdistricts, 5 towns and 3 townships:

- Dongba Subdistrict (东坝街道)
- Jialing Subdistrict (嘉陵街道)
- Hexi Subdistrict (河西街道)
- Xuefeng Subdistrict (雪峰街道)
- Nanhe Subdistrict (南河街道)
- Shangxi Subdistrict (上西街道)
- Wanyuan Subdistrict (万缘街道)
- Rongshan Town (荣山镇)
- Dashi Town (大石镇)
- Panlong Town (盘龙镇)
- Baolun Town (宝轮镇)
- Sandui Town (三堆镇)
- Baichao Township (白朝乡)
- Jindong Township (金洞乡)
- Longtan Township (龙潭乡)

== Education ==
The "micro school development alliance", which covers 14 schools in the district, was established by 14 school principals. In 2016 over 220 teachers work at those schools.
