= Lijia Township, Qinghai =

Lijia Township 李家乡
- Township
- Location in Qinghai
- Coordinates: 36°32′55″N 102°32′30″E
- Country: People's Republic of China
- Province: Qinghai
- Prefecture-level city: Haidong
- District: Ledu District
- Time zone: UTC+8 (China Standard)

Lijia Township (simplified Chinese: 李家乡; traditional Chinese: 李家鄉; pinyin: Lǐjiā Xiāng) is a township in Ledu District, Haidong, Qinghai, China. As of 2020, it administers the following 17 villages:

- Lannigou Village (烂泥沟村)
- Gangouling Village (甘沟岭村)
- Dawa Village (大洼村)
- Majuan Village (马圈村)
- Minzu Village (民族村)
- He'erhong Village (合尔红村)
- Gongcagou Village (公擦沟村)
- Ataling Village (阿塔岭村)
- Ximaying Village (西马营村)
- Dongmaying Village (东马营村)
- Danke'er Village (丹科尔村)
- Chenjiamo Village (陈家磨村)
- Gaquanwan Village (尕泉湾村)
- He'erci Village (和尔茨村)
- Jiaojiewan Village (交界湾村)
- Shanzhuang Village (山庄村)
- Shuangping Village (双坪村)
