= Hutang =

Coordinates: 31°43′45″N 119°56′35″E

Hutang Town is the government headquarters of Wujin District in Changzhou City. It is the center of Wujin District in economy, politics and culture. Hutang Town covers an area of 84 square kilometers. It has a population of 200,000, of which 128,000 residents. Hutang is known as one of "Top Towns" in Jiangsu Province.

It has even got the laurel "China Township Stars" twice. In 2002, Hutang was regarded as "Chinese Textile Town" by China Textile Industry Association
