= World Joyland =

Amusement park in Changzhou, China

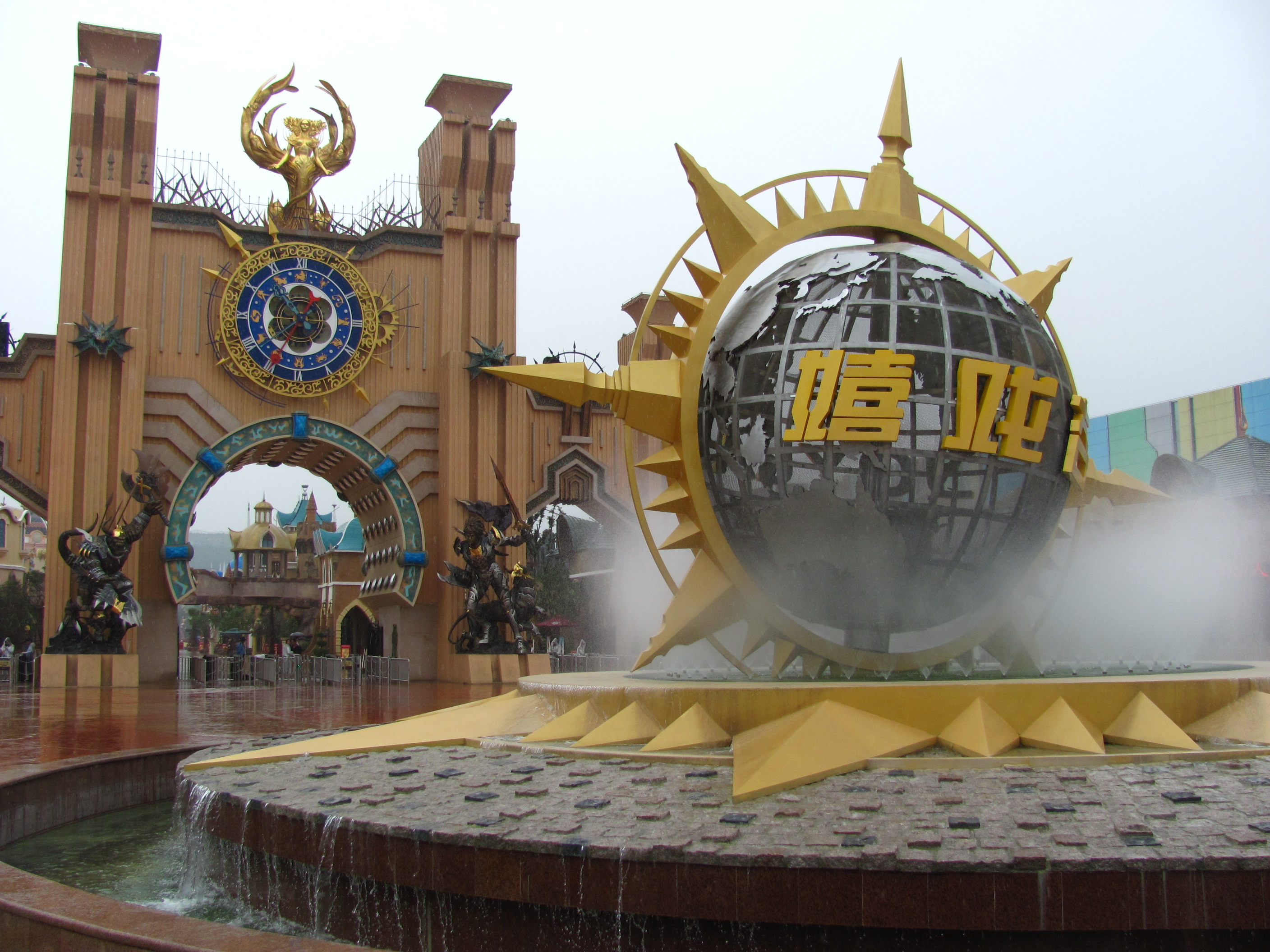
- Park entrance
- Interactive map of World Joyland
- Location: Changzhou, China
- Coordinates: 31°30′00″N 120°02′30″E
- Opened: 1 May 2011

World Joyland (Chinese: 环球动漫嬉戏谷) is a theme park located in Changzhou, in southern Jiangsu province of the People's Republic of China. The park's theme is inspired by the video game series World of Warcraft and StarCraft. It reportedly cost $48m (£30m) to build, and is not officially licensed or endorsed by Activision Blizzard.

== See also ==
- Sky Scrapper, a flying roller coaster at the park
