= Lijia, Anyue County =

Lijia 李家镇
- Town
- Location in Sichuan
- Coordinates: 29°48′2″N 105°28′34″E
- Country: People's Republic of China
- Province: Sichuan
- Prefecture-level city: Ziyang
- County: Anyue County
- Time zone: UTC+8 (China Standard)

Lijia (Chinese: 李家; pinyin: Lǐjiā) is a town in Anyue County, Sichuan province, China. As of 2020, it administers the following six residential communities and 14 villages:

- Tuanjie Community (团结社区)
- Wangjiaba Community (汪家坝社区)
- Gaowu Community (高屋社区)
- Heping Community (和平社区)
- Dongfeng Community (东风社区)
- Xianfeng Community (先锋社区)
- Daoliu Village (倒流村)
- Zhonggou Village (中沟村)
- Shuangshi Village (双石村)
- Motan Village (磨滩村)
- Gufo Village (古佛村)
- Longshi Village (龙石村)
- Guanyan Village (观岩村)
- Gongping Village (公坪村)
- Zhengfang Village (正方村)
- Jiama Village (驾马村)
- Dawu Village (大屋村)
- Sujiaqiao Village (苏家桥村)
- Longwang Village (龙王村)
- Rutang Village (儒堂村)
