= Lijia, Nanchong =

Lijia 李家镇
- Town
- Location in Sichuan
- Coordinates: 31°4′15″N 106°8′30″E
- Country: People's Republic of China
- Province: Sichuan
- Prefecture-level city: Nanchong
- District: Shunqing District
- Time zone: UTC+8 (China Standard)

Lijia (Chinese: 李家; pinyin: Lǐjiā) is a town in Shunqing District, Nanchong, Sichuan province, China. As of 2020, it administers Lijia Residential Community and the following 18 villages:

- Jinhuanjing Village (金环井村)
- Shuiguanyin Village (水观音村)
- Caobachang Village (草坝场村)
- Wulongqiao Village (五龙桥村)
- Qingping Village (青平村)
- Yeyatan Village (野鸭滩村)
- Huaguangmiao Village (华光庙村)
- Longfeng Village (龙凤村)
- Juandongmen Village (卷洞门村)
- Longshanguan Village (东山观村)
- Xinqiao Village (新桥村)
- Chongxianjing Village (崇仙境村)
- Lihua Village (李花村)
- Daoqiangxin Village (稻香新村)
- Taipingshan Village (太平山村)
- Huojianqiao Village (火箭桥村)
- Guihuahu Village (桂花湖村)
- Dayanshan Village (大堰山村)
