= Lijia, Linshui County =

Lijia 黎家镇
- Town
- Location in Sichuan
- Coordinates: 30°5′38″N 107°0′14″E
- Country: People's Republic of China
- Province: Sichuan
- Prefecture-level city: Guang'an
- County: Linshui County
- Time zone: UTC+8 (China Standard)

Lijia (Chinese: 黎家; pinyin: Líjiā) is a town in Linshui County, Sichuan province, China. As of 2020, it administers Renhe Residential Community (人和社区) and six villages:

- Yaowangding Village (药王顶村)
- Dajiesi Village (搭界寺村)
- Guanghuading Village (光华顶村)
- Doupengshi Village (斗篷石村)
- Gaofengchang Village (高峰场村)
- Jinzhuping Village (金竹坪村)
