= Lijia Township, Fujian =

Lijia Township 李家乡
- Township
- Location in Fujian Lijia Township (China)
- Coordinates: 25°49′48″N 116°47′13″E
- Country: People's Republic of China
- Province: Fujian
- Prefecture-level city: Sanming
- County: Qingliu County
- Time zone: UTC+8 (China Standard)

Lijia Township (simplified Chinese: 李家乡; traditional Chinese: 李家鄉; pinyin: Lǐjiā Xiāng) is a township in Qingliu County, Fujian, China. As of 2020, it administers the following eight villages:

- Li Village (李村)
- Hebei Village (河背村)
- Xianshui Village (鲜水村)
- Changguan Village (长灌村)
- Zaohepai Village (早禾排村)
- Wujia Village (吴家村)
- Gukeng Village (古坑村)
- Luokeng Village (罗坑村)
