= Lijia, Jiangsu =

Lijia 礼嘉镇
- Town
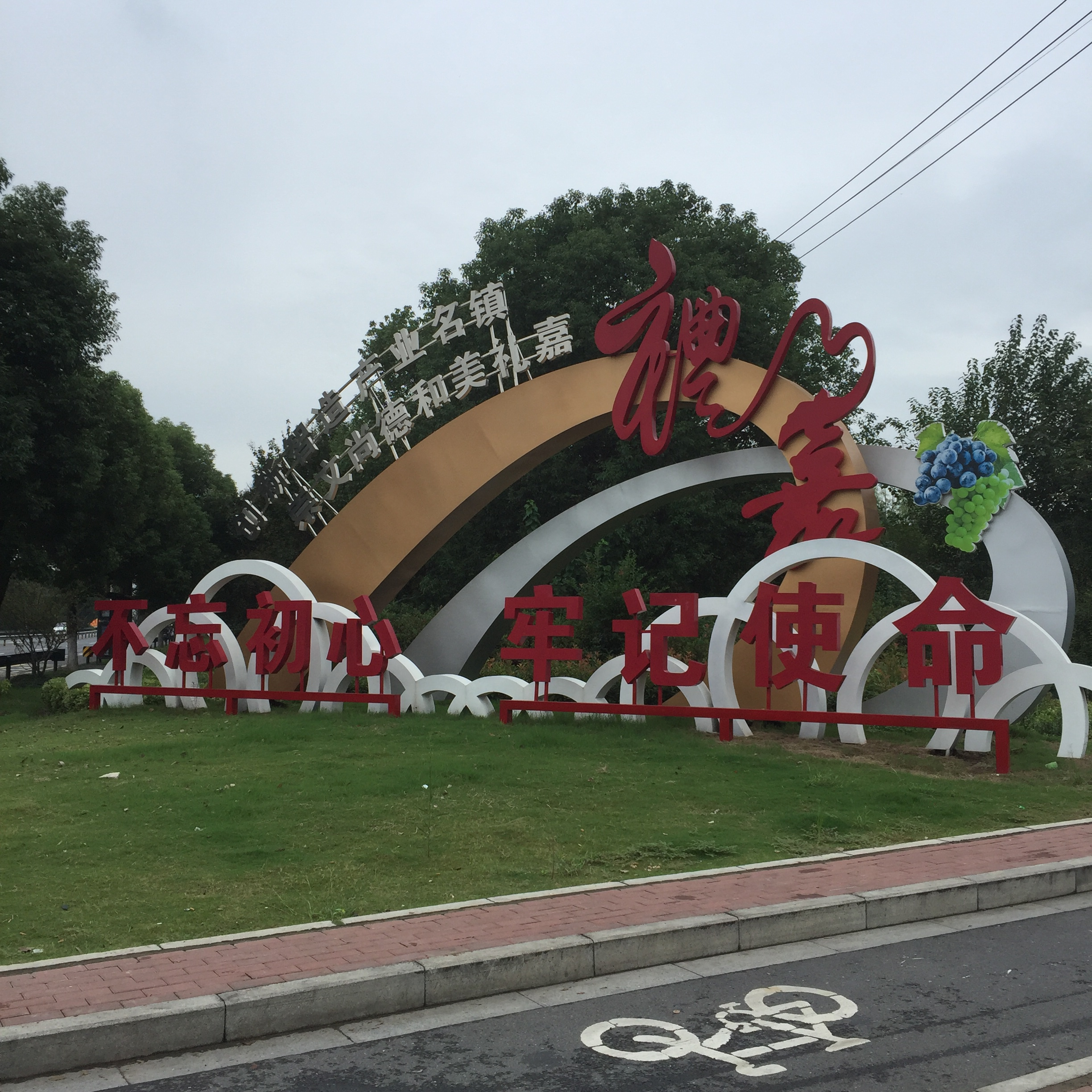
- A welcome sign in Lijia Town

- Location in Jiangsu
- Coordinates: 31°38′0″N 120°0′20″E
- Country: People's Republic of China
- Province: Jiangsu
- Prefecture-level city: Changzhou
- District: Wujin District
- Time zone: UTC+8 (China Standard)

Lijia (Chinese: 礼嘉; pinyin: Lǐjiā) is a town in Wujin District, Changzhou, Jiangsu province, China. As of 2020, it administers the following three residential communities and 14 villages:

- Lijia Community
- Banshang Community (坂上社区)
- Zhengping Community (政平社区)
- Lijia Village
- Banshang Village (坂上村)
- Zhengping Village (政平村)
- Xinchen Village (新辰村)
- Qinxiang Village (秦巷村)
- Jiandong Village (建东村)
- Luzhuang Village (陆庄村)
- Maojia Village (毛家村)
- Heshu Village (何墅村)
- Pu'an Village (蒲岸村)
- Wuyang Village (武阳村)
- Pangjiajie Village (庞家街村)
- Huadu Village (华渡村)
- Dalu Village (大路村)
