= Guangyuan =

Prefecture-level city in Sichuan, China

Guangyuan 广元市
- Prefecture-level city
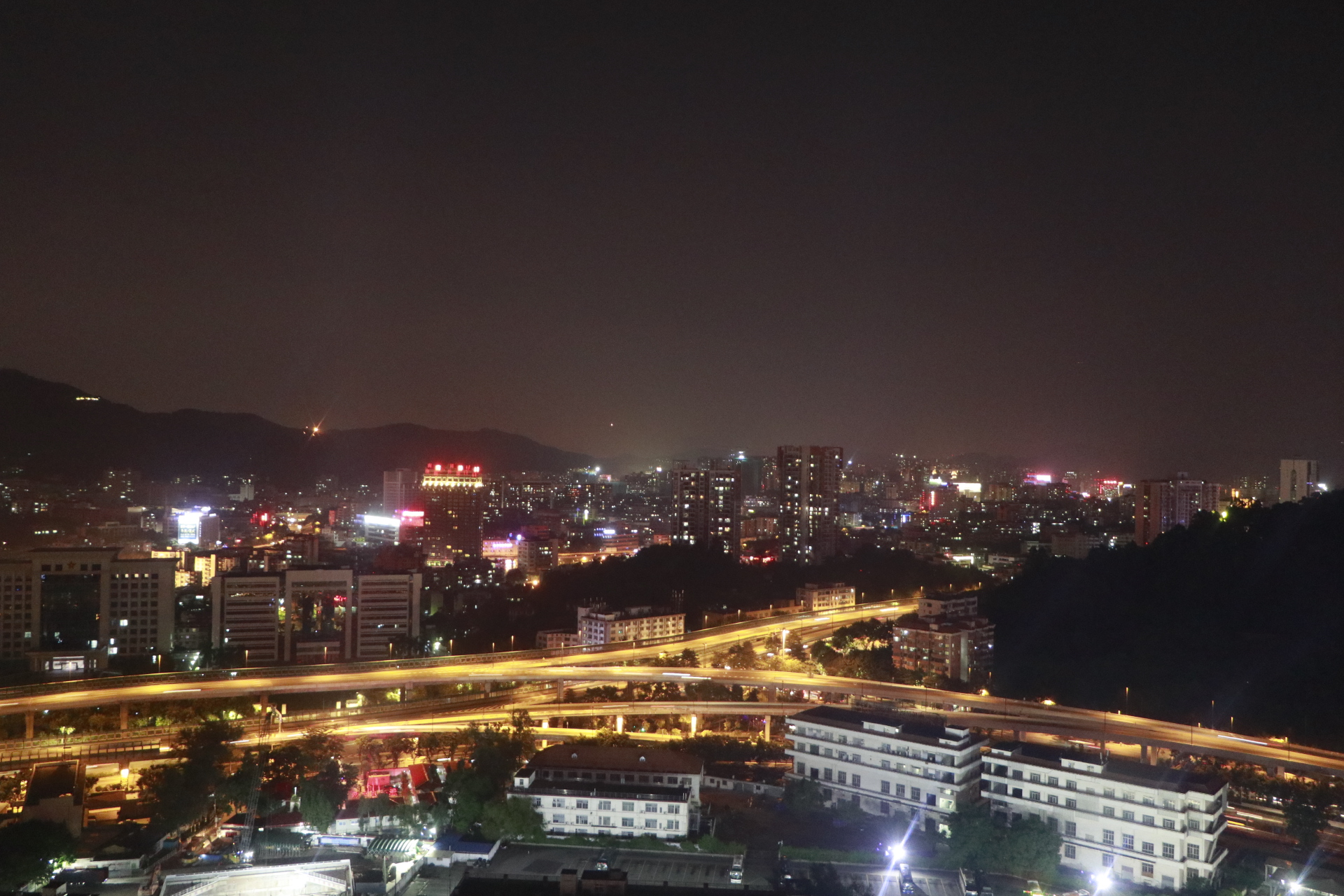

- Location of Guangyuan in Sichuan

- Location of the city center in Sichuan
- Coordinates (Guangyuan municipal government): 32°26′10″N 105°50′38″E
- Country: People's Republic of China
- Province: Sichuan
- Municipal seat: Lizhou District

Area
  - Total: 16,313.78 km^{2} (6,298.79 sq mi)

Population (2020)
  - Total: 2,305,657
  - Density: 141.3319/km^{2} (366.0479/sq mi)

GDP
  - Total: CN¥ 60.5 billion US$ 9.7 billion
  - Per capita: CN¥ 23,263; US$ 3,735
- Time zone: UTC+8 (China Standard)
- Postal code: 628017
- Area code: 0839
- ISO 3166 code: CN-SC-08
- Website: www.cngy.gov.cn

Guangyuan (simplified Chinese: 广元; traditional Chinese: 廣元; pinyin: Guǎngyuán; Wade–Giles: Kuang-yüan) is a prefecture-level city in Sichuan Province, China, bordering the provinces of Shaanxi to the northeast and Gansu to the northwest. Guangyuan City is located on the northern edge of the Sichuan Basin, on the upper reaches of the Jialing River, and is the junction of Sichuan, Shaanxi and Gansu provinces. The city has a population of 2,305,657 as of the 2020 census. By the end of 2024, the registered population of the city will be 2,893,700. Among them, the urban population is 814,800 and the rural population is 2.078,800, accounting for 28.2% and 71.8% of the total population respectively.

Located roughly between the provincial capitals Chengdu, Lanzhou, Xi'an and Chongqing municipality, it is considered the northern gateway to Sichuan. It is an ancient city, notable for its relics and tombs.

== History ==
Formerly known as Lizhou (利州, or Li prefecture), Guangyuan was the birthplace of Wu Zetian, the only woman in Chinese history to rule directly as emperor.

On 12 May 2008, a magnitude 7.9 earthquake occurred. 4,822 people were killed, 28,245 injured, and 125 missing in the city as of 7 June 2008.

== Economy ==
Guangyuan's economy is based on a diverse array of heavy industry, as well as mining and agriculture. Plant 821, a former large plutonium producing reactor, now used to process nuclear waste, is located near Guangyuan. The city is an important production center for traditional Chinese medicine.

== Administrative divisions ==
As of March 2024, Guangyuan City has jurisdiction over 3 districts and 4 counties.

Map
| Name | Hanzi | Hanyu Pinyin | Population (2010) | Area (km^{2}) | Density (/km^{2}) |
|---|---|---|---|---|---|
| Lizhou District | 利州区 | Lìzhōu Qū | 516,424 | 1,482 | 348 |
| Zhaohua District | 昭化区 | Zhāohuà Qū | 168,489 | 1,435 | 117 |
| Chaotian District | 朝天区 | Cháotiān Qū | 174,333 | 1,618 | 108 |
| Wangcang County | 旺苍县 | Wàngcāng Xiàn | 385,787 | 2,976 | 130 |
| Qingchuan County | 青川县 | Qīngchuān Xiàn | 222,253 | 3,269 | 68 |
| Jiange County | 剑阁县 | Jiàngé Xiàn | 457,656 | 3,204 | 142 |
| Cangxi County | 苍溪县 | Cāngxī Xiàn | 559,181 | 2,330 | 240 |

== Climate ==
Guangyuan has a subtropical humid monsoon climate with distinct four seasons, abundant rainfall, mild and humid weather, with an average annual rainfall of about 900 mm and an average annual temperature of 16.1 °C. It has the characteristics of large regional differences, significant three-dimensional climate, and prominent seasonal changes.

Climate data for Guangyuan, elevation 545 m (1,788 ft), (1991–2020 normals, extremes 1981–present)
| Month | Jan | Feb | Mar | Apr | May | Jun | Jul | Aug | Sep | Oct | Nov | Dec | Year |
|---|---|---|---|---|---|---|---|---|---|---|---|---|---|
| Record high °C (°F) | 19.5 (67.1) | 26.0 (78.8) | 32.8 (91.0) | 35.2 (95.4) | 36.8 (98.2) | 40.0 (104.0) | 40.9 (105.6) | 40.9 (105.6) | 36.6 (97.9) | 31.1 (88.0) | 26.3 (79.3) | 19.7 (67.5) | 40.9 (105.6) |
| Mean daily maximum °C (°F) | 9.6 (49.3) | 12.4 (54.3) | 17.4 (63.3) | 23.4 (74.1) | 27.4 (81.3) | 30.1 (86.2) | 31.5 (88.7) | 31.2 (88.2) | 26.2 (79.2) | 21.2 (70.2) | 16.2 (61.2) | 10.8 (51.4) | 21.4 (70.6) |
| Daily mean °C (°F) | 5.4 (41.7) | 8.1 (46.6) | 12.3 (54.1) | 17.6 (63.7) | 21.7 (71.1) | 24.8 (76.6) | 26.5 (79.7) | 26.0 (78.8) | 21.6 (70.9) | 16.8 (62.2) | 11.8 (53.2) | 6.8 (44.2) | 16.6 (61.9) |
| Mean daily minimum °C (°F) | 2.4 (36.3) | 5.0 (41.0) | 8.5 (47.3) | 13.3 (55.9) | 17.2 (63.0) | 20.6 (69.1) | 22.8 (73.0) | 22.3 (72.1) | 18.6 (65.5) | 14.1 (57.4) | 8.7 (47.7) | 3.9 (39.0) | 13.1 (55.6) |
| Record low °C (°F) | −4.5 (23.9) | −2.9 (26.8) | −3.2 (26.2) | 2.7 (36.9) | 8.3 (46.9) | 12.9 (55.2) | 16.0 (60.8) | 15.0 (59.0) | 11.7 (53.1) | 1.7 (35.1) | −0.8 (30.6) | −5.7 (21.7) | −5.7 (21.7) |
| Average precipitation mm (inches) | 4.7 (0.19) | 9.3 (0.37) | 17.5 (0.69) | 49.2 (1.94) | 90.5 (3.56) | 124.5 (4.90) | 247.1 (9.73) | 147.4 (5.80) | 138.0 (5.43) | 57.0 (2.24) | 19.3 (0.76) | 4.2 (0.17) | 908.7 (35.78) |
| Average precipitation days (≥ 0.1 mm) | 4.3 | 5.1 | 7.3 | 10.0 | 12.0 | 12.1 | 14.6 | 13.2 | 13.5 | 12.3 | 6.6 | 4.0 | 115 |
| Average snowy days | 2.5 | 1.0 | 0.2 | 0.1 | 0 | 0 | 0 | 0 | 0 | 0 | 0.2 | 0.8 | 4.8 |
| Average relative humidity (%) | 63 | 63 | 61 | 62 | 62 | 68 | 74 | 74 | 76 | 75 | 70 | 66 | 68 |
| Mean monthly sunshine hours | 71.4 | 68.4 | 98.5 | 132.3 | 147.7 | 133.1 | 140.2 | 155.1 | 86.7 | 79.4 | 78.0 | 76.1 | 1,266.9 |
| Percentage possible sunshine | 22 | 22 | 26 | 34 | 34 | 31 | 32 | 38 | 24 | 23 | 25 | 25 | 28 |
Source: China Meteorological Administration all-time extreme temperature

== Transport ==
Located roughly between the provincial capitals Chengdu, Chongqing, Lanzhou, Xi'an, Guangyuan is an important traffic hub in northern Sichuan. The city has a port on the Jialing River, which is the closest inland port to Northwest China, and navigable all the way the east coast.

- China National Highway 212
- G5 Beijing–Kunming Expressway
- G5012 Enguang Expressway
- G75 Lanzhou–Haikou Expressway
- Baoji–Chengdu railway (part of the main route from Chengdu to Xi'an and Beijing)
- Xi'an–Chengdu high-speed railway (completed in December 2017)
- Lanzhou–Chongqing high-speed railway It is a north–south railway trunk line starting from Lanzhou in the north and ending in Chongqing in the south, passing through cities such as Lanzhou, Dingxi, Longnan, Tongnan, Tongliang, and Chongqing. The total length of the line is about 800 kilometers.
- Guangyuan Panlong Airport Its geographical coordinates are 32°23'28"N 105°42'07"E.

== Culture ==
=== Tourist attractions ===
Guangyuan has a history of over 2,300 years. Since ancient times, it has been an important gateway to Sichuan, the former territory of the State of Ju, a strategic pass into Shu, a key town during the Three Kingdoms period, the hometown of Empress Wu Zetian, and an important part of the Sichuan–Shaanxi revolutionary base. Today, it is a popular tourist city in Sichuan Province. Guangyuan has received numerous honors, including being recognized as a Demonstration Zone for the Integration of Agriculture, Science, and Education, a National Garden City, a National Hygienic City, an Outstanding Chinese Tourist City, a New-Type Industrialization Base, and the "Hometown of Hot Springs in China." The city is home to 9 national nature reserves, 18 provincial nature reserves, 8 national cultural heritage sites, and 17 provincial cultural heritage sites, making its tourism resources highly concentrated. Its famous tourist attractions include:

Jianmen Pass Scenic Area, located on the northern edge of the Sichuan Basin, is a famous natural mountain pass in China, named for its cliffs resembling swords and walls facing each other like a gate. During the Three Kingdoms period, Zhuge Liang, chancellor of Shu, built plank roads and set up guards here, calling it "Jian'ge." The Tang poet Li Bai praised it in Shu Dao Nan with the line, "One man guards the pass, ten thousand cannot open it," which made Jianmen Pass widely renowned. It was listed as one of the first national key scenic spots in 1982, designated a National AAAA-level scenic area in 2010, and included in the national 5A-level tourist attractions in 2015.

The Thousand-Buddha Cliff statue was first carved in the late Northern Wei period and reached its peak during the Tang dynasty. It now preserves around 950 niches and more than 7,000 statues, and has been listed as a Major National Historical and Cultural Site. Centered on the Dayun Grotto, the statues are densely arranged like a honeycomb, rising up to thirteen levels, reflecting the artistic style of Tang dynasty Buddhism. The site is designated as a National 4A-level tourist attraction.

Zhaohua Ancient Town, located in Zhaohua District, Guangyuan, Sichuan Province, is a National AAAA-level tourist attraction. It preserves numerous relics from the Three Kingdoms period and is regarded as one of the better-preserved ancient towns from that era, with historical and cultural significance as well as natural landscapes.

Qingxi Ancient Town was established during the Three Kingdoms period and retains Ming dynasty city walls and buildings from the Ming and Qing dynasties. It was an important pass on the Yinping Ancient Road, with preserved wengcheng-style gates and stone-paved streets. In 2013, it was designated a National 4A-level tourist attraction, and in 2020, it was included among Sichuan's cultural tourism characteristic towns.

== Cuisine ==
Guangyuan is known for Wangcang noodles.

Guangyuan walnut shortbread is a crunchy pastry made with walnuts. It tastes sweet and fragrant.

Guangyuan-style doufunao is usually savory. It contains coriander, peanuts and chili oil, and has a unique flavor.

Steamed cold noodles, unlike cold skin noodles which are made from wheat flour, are made by mixing rice and glutinous rice to form a rice paste, which is then steamed.

Jianmenguan Tofu, a specialty of Jianmenguan, has been developed since the Three Kingdoms period and is known for its savory and delicious flavor.
