= Wujin, Changzhou =

Wujin 武进区
- District
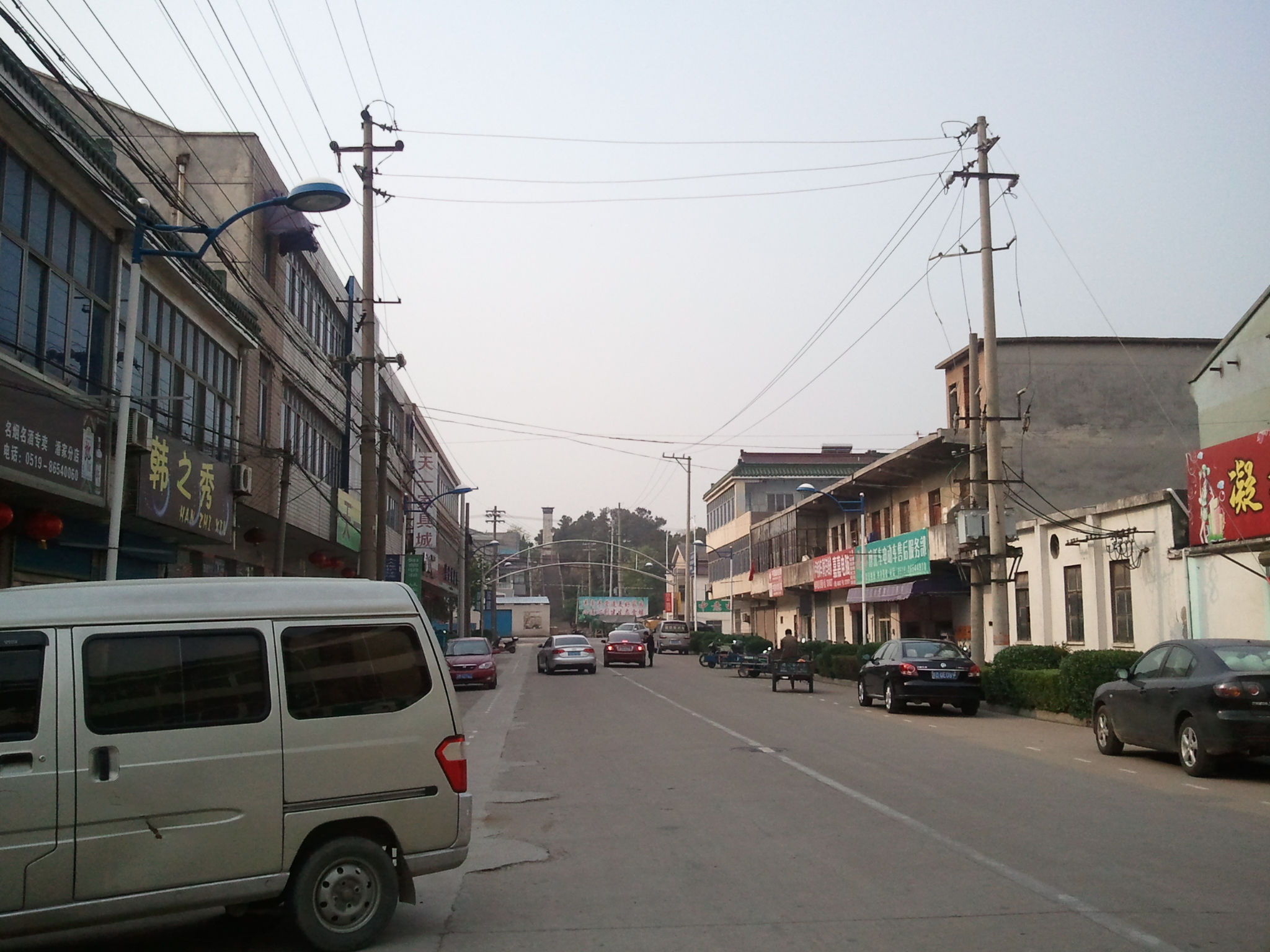
- Wujin District in April 2011

- Location in Jiangsu
- Coordinates: 31°37′03″N 119°56′12″E
- Country: People's Republic of China
- Province: Jiangsu
- Prefecture-level city: Changzhou

Area
  - District: 1,066 km^{2} (412 sq mi)

Population (2020)
  - District: 1,697,380
  - Density: 1,592/km^{2} (4,124/sq mi)
  - Urban: 1,191,844 (70%)
  - Rural: 505,536 (30%)
- Time zone: UTC+8 (China Standard)
- Postal code: 213100

Wujin District (simplified Chinese: 武进区; traditional Chinese: 武進區; pinyin: Wǔjìn Qū; Wade–Giles: Wu-chin; postal: Wutsin) is a district under the jurisdiction of Changzhou in Jiangsu province of the People's Republic of China. In 2005, Wujin was ranked as 8th in the top 100 best counties in Mainland China.

== History ==
In 2020 the total population was recorded at 1.7 million people, an increase from the 1.2m inhabitants recorded in 1999. In 2005 Wujin was ranked as 8th in the top 100 best cities and counties in mainland China. On May 7, 2015, Qishuyan District became a part of Wujin District.

== Administrative divisions ==
At present, Wujin District has 5 subdistricts and 14 towns.

5 subdistricts

- Nanxiashu (南夏墅街道)
- Xihu (西湖街道)

-Former Qishuyan District has 3 subdistricts.

- Qishuyan (戚墅堰街道)
- Dingyan (丁堰街道)
- Lucheng (潞城街道)

14 towns

- Hutang (湖塘镇)
- Niutang (牛塘镇)
- Luoyang (洛阳镇)
- Yaoguan (遥观镇)
- Henglin (横林镇)
- Xueyan (雪堰镇)
- Zhenglu (郑陆镇)
- Hengshanqiao (横山桥镇)
- Qianhuang (前黄镇)
- Lijia (礼嘉镇)
- Zouqu (邹区镇)
- Jiaze (嘉泽镇)
- Huangli (湟里镇)
- Benniu (奔牛镇)

== Dialect ==
The local language is the Changzhou dialect of Wu Chinese.

== Tourism ==
The district is most famous for the Chunqiu Yancheng, the remains of an ancient city from the Spring and Autumn period.

== Education ==
The Wycombe Abbey International School of Changzhou (formerly Oxford International College of Changzhou) is located in Wujin District, serving Chinese and foreign students for kindergarten through high school. Wujin Star Experimental school is a private school also in the district.
