= Canal 5 Creative Campus =

Tourist attraction in Changzhou, China

Canal 5 Creative Campus is located in Changzhou, Zhonglou District, Sanbao Street No.141. It founded in the end of 2008. It covers 36388 square meters and the floor area is about 32000 square meters large.

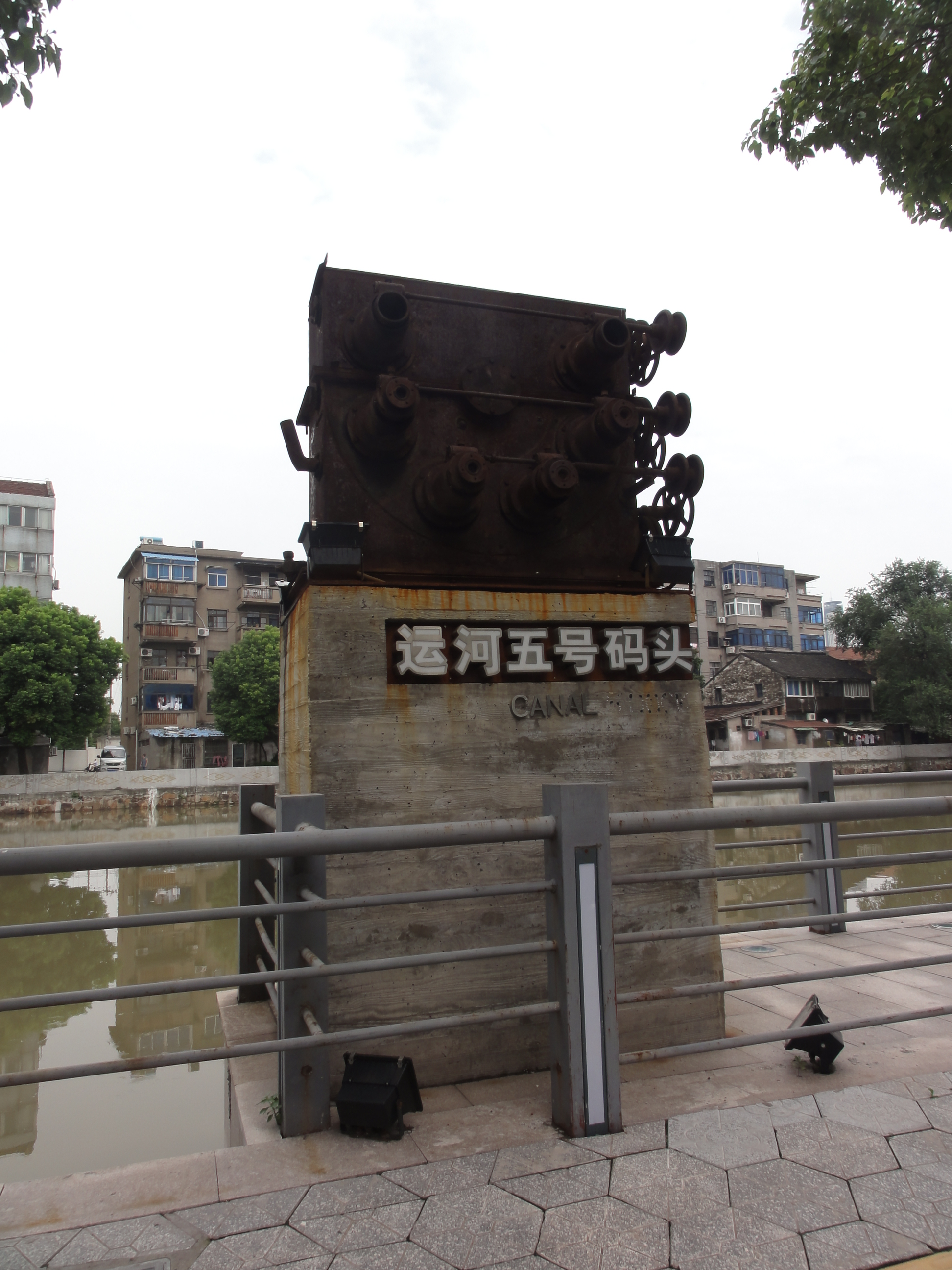
the gate of the Canal 5 Creative Campus

Sanbao Street used to be a place where merchant gathered and the market flourished especially for the wood industries. It made a number of super wood businessmen of Changzhou. It commercial status could be equal to Qingguo Lane. Canal 5 Creative Campus is a multifunctional block full of canal culture, industry remains and creative designs. It is the National AA Tourist Attraction Rating Categories and the Factory Tour Demonstration site of Changzhou.

Although the canal haven't been open to navigation for a long time, its loquacious glide still tells us the prosperity in the old time and the history once happened in Changzhou. Canal 5 Creative Campus had been included in 2010 Changzhou Tourism Culture Year.

== Origin of the name ==
- In the Chinese culture the number five and the number nine are regard as the symbol of the luck.
- The place used to be the No. 5 Woolen Mill remains. The former No. 5 Woolen Mill was one of the biggest woolen mills in Changzhou. The annual output could reach eight hundred thousand woollen blanket creating the Changzhou Wool textile industry's production records.
- In the Chinese, the pronunciation of the number five is the same as the character myself(吾). This presents the idea of the Canal 5 Creative Campus. It includes the creativity, imagination and the chances providing for the young Chinese to start their own business.

== Search ==
The main entrance of Canal 5 Creative Campus has a pier which can bring the visitors to get to the scenes such as Hongmei Park, Dongpo Park and Tianning Temple and so on.
