= Hongmei Park =

Park in Jiangsu, China

Hongmei Park (Chinese: 红梅公园) also called Red Plum Park, is a park located in the northeast of Changzhou City, in southern Jiangsu province, People's Republic of China. It is one of the largest comprehensive parks in Changzhou, covering an area of 37 hectares and includes gardens and a lake. There is a famous ancient architecture called Hongmei Pavilion and that is why it is named Hongmei.

== History and development ==
Hongmei Park was established in 1958 and was opened in 1960. The topography in this park is undulating and it is featured with rivers and lakes. In the park, there are Wenbi Tower and Hongmei Pavilion. They are all key cultural relics protection units in China. In addition, memorials such as Banshan Pavilion, Jiasha Tower, Bingmei Stone, and Wenbi Building can be visited there. Over several decades, Hongmei Park has become the largest comprehensive park in Changzhou district. Over 200,000 tourists at home and abroad come to visit this park every year.

Hongmei Pavilion was built between the Tang dynasty and Song dynasty, dating back a thousand years of history. Now the Hongmei Pavilion is the reconstruction of the Qing dynasty. The whole building is stately, imposing and unsophisticated, rare to see in other pavilions in general. Each time when spring comes after winter, red plums are in full bloom. Visitors come in a continuous stream, appreciating the plum or overlooking the snow-covered landscape. Opposite the Hongmei Pavilion is the remains of a rare ice ages, Plum Stone. Zhao Yi, a famous Changzhou poet in the Qing dynasty, praised the beauty of Hongmei Pavilion through his poem. Early leaders Qu Qiubai and Zhang Tailei used to go to Hongmei Pavilion to read books and enjoy the scenery. There is also a "Changzhou historical celebrity gallery" in Hongmei Pavilion's upstairs, displaying life stories of Changzhou heroes, such as Qu Qiubai, Zhang Tailei and Yun Daiying. In December 2007, Plum Park was awarded the title of national AAAA level scenic spots by the National scenic quality rating, following the Tianmu Lake Scenic Area, Mao Mountain Scenic Area, China Dinosaur Park, Tianning Temple and Nanshan Bamboo Park.

To meet people's further needs in public places of leisure and recreation to a greater extent and improve the quality of life of the people around, in 2005, the Municipal Government decided to extend Hongmei Park. The new Hongmei Park is designed as a public park, the typical garden in the city center. It was a great popular project during the history of building gardens in Changzhou. As of 2011, Hongmei Park includes greenlands and a 9.3 hectare garden area.

== Customs ==
From May 15 to June 1 every year, it's the traditional rose lantern festival of Changzhou Hongmei Park. Besides, Changzhou Tourism Festival is held between September and October.
