= Changzhou Songjianhu Senior High School =

Changzhou Songjianhu Senior High School 常州宋剑湖高级中学
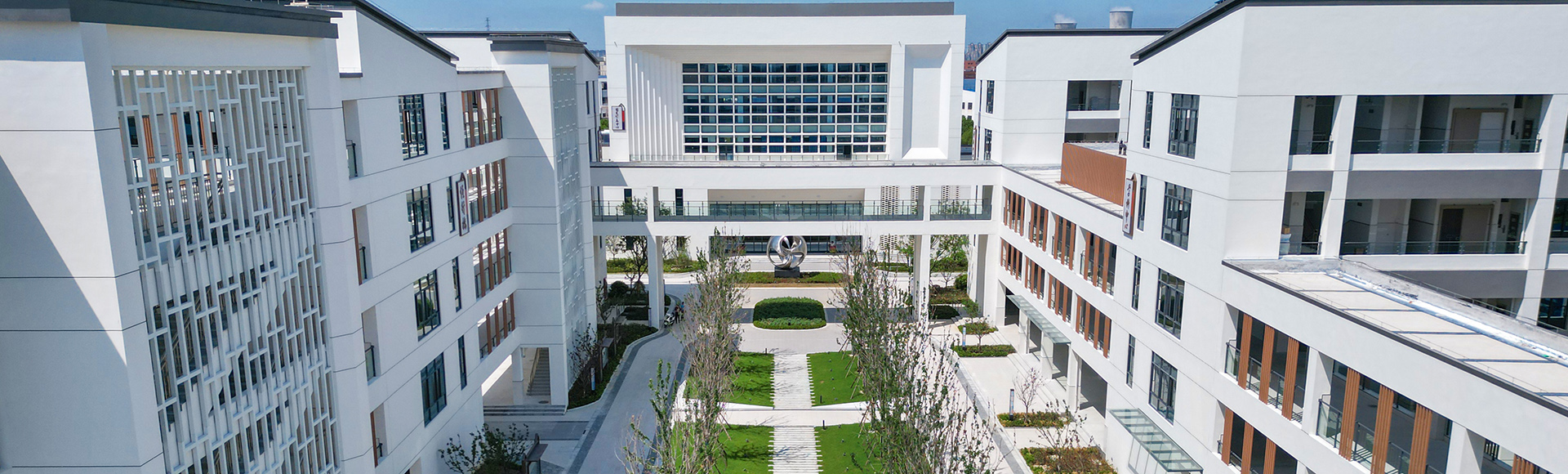

Location
- No.1, Liudao Road, Jingkai District, Changzhou, P.R. China 213100; Changzhou, Jiangsu; China
- Coordinates: 31.7119°N 120.0295°E

Information
- Type: High School
- Motto: 力行 (Strive for excellence)
- Established: September 2022
- CEEB code: 546761
- Domestic Department Principal: 刘国银 (Pinyin: Liú guóyín)
- International Department Principal: 何其新 (Pinyin: Hé qíxīn)
- Mascot: Squirrel
- Website: http://en.sjhschool.cn

Changzhou Songjianhu Senior High School (Chinese: 常州宋剑湖高级中学; pinyin: Chángzhōu sòngjiànhú gāojí zhōngxué) was founded in 4 April 2023 and officially began enrollment in the fall of 2023. With a total investment of CN¥538 million, the school was implemented as a key education initiative by the Changzhou Economic and Technological Development Zone. The school is a non-profit and adheres to the provincial four-star high school standards. As of December 2024, it is officially recognized by the Changzhou Municipal Education Bureau.

The school is located near the Songjianhu Ecological Tourism Area and consists of an assortment of classrooms, science laboratories, dormitories, a track and field, a gymnasium, and an administrative building, covering a total area of more than 67,000 square meters. Dormitories house 6 people per room and are equipped with an en suite bathroom, air conditioning, and 24-hour hot water; each floor has a shared washing machine, a public bathroom, and a full-time teacher and cleaning staff who ensure the cleanliness of living quarters. The campus' design mainly draws from a contemporary Chinese style but does not shy away from implementing more modern elements involving metal, glass, and bricks.

The school's motto is "力行" (Strive for excellence) and its mascot is the squirrel. Leaders at the school include Guoyin Liu (Chinese: 刘国银; pinyin: Liú guóyín), principal of the domestic department, and Qixin He (Chinese: 何其新; pinyin: Hé qíxīn), principal of the international department. The school's tuition was approved by the Changzhou Municipal Development and Reform Commission Changzhou Municipal Education Bureau to be 17,000 yuan per semester from the fall of 2023 to 2025.

== Founding ==
On 26 March 2023, the school held a seminar inviting esteemed education experts to provide guidance on the school's cultural development, faculty development, educational philosophy, and teaching quality. At the event, eight experts and scholars form universities like Nanjing University and Nanjing Normal University were appointed as members of the Songjianhu High School Academic Committee which will serve as a "think tank" for the school's future development.

On 19 April 2025, the school held a campus open day for students and parents which included a tour of the entire campus — the teaching buildings, laboratories, libraries, dining halls, and dormitories — and a town hall where school leaders and teachers alleviated parents' concerns about topics like admissions policy, curriculum, and student management.

== Domestic Department ==
In 2024, the school's Zhongkao (the country's national senior high school entrance exam taken by junior high students) score cutoff was about 470 for most regions in Changzhou; however, the cutoff for students for students from Jintan District was much higher at 511, indicating higher competition and/or the school's general enrollment plans in that area.

== International Department ==
While the school's majority domestic department students follow a conventional Chinese curriculum which prepares students for the Gaokao (the country's national college entrance exam taken by senior high students), its international department is particularly unique in its diverse catalog of AP, A-Level, EJU, and DSE courses that prepare students for admission to universities abroad. There are currently no restrictions regarding nationality, household status, or previous school affiliation for admittance into the international department.

Furthermore, the international department mainly employs teachers with advanced degrees from abroad, features small class sizes of 15-20 people, and is the first and only Cognia-certified school in Changzhou. In 2024, leaders from the school visited the David Game College and signed an agreement to establish a Sino-British partnership.

However, the tuition for students in the international department is considerably higher than those in the domestic department. Compared to the 17,000 yuan per semester tuition set by the domestic department, the international department's A-Level and EJU students are charged a tuition of 98,000 yuan per year with additional registration and/or class fees; DSE students are charged 138,000 yuan per year with an additional class fee of 5,000 yuan per semester.

Nonetheless, the department's scholarship program reduces this comparatively pricey tuition greatly for top students. For instance, applicants with an IELTS score of at least 6.5, a TOEFL score of at least 90, or good performance in the admission assessment (at least 85% on the main test with the completion of an additional test) are eligible for a 30% reduction in tuition, while applicants with an IELTS score of at least 7.0, a TOEFL score of at least 95, or exemplar performance in the admission assessment (at least 90% on the main test with the completion of an additional test) may have their entire tuition waived.
