= Wenbi Tower =

Coordinates: 31.77374°N 119.96957°E

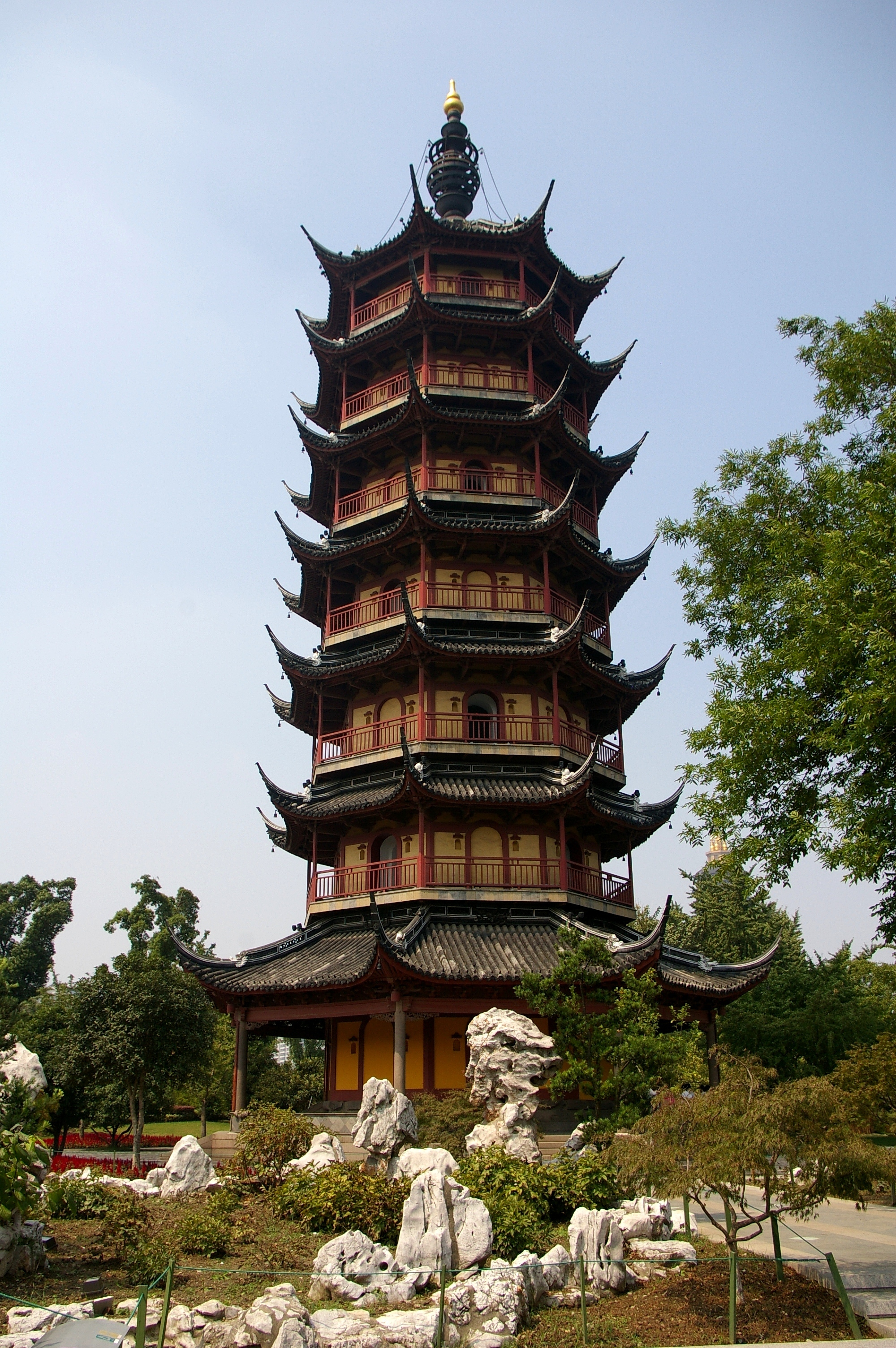
Wenbi Tower

Wenbi Tower (Chinese: 文笔塔) is a tower in Changzhou, China, located near Hongmei Park. It was built during the Southern Dynasties, Qi Gaozu, Xiao Daocheng (萧道成), Jianyuan (479－482), and first named Jianyuan Temple. Later, it was changed to Peace Tower. Because the tower looks like a pen, people changed the name into Wenbi Tower. As time went on, the temple had been deteriorated because of wars, natural disasters and the Cultural Revolution. Not until the reform and opening up did Liu Biru, a Chinese-American, subsidized restoration of the temple in 1982.

== Description ==
Wenbi Tower is 48.38 meters tall, and the bottom outside diameter is 9.58 meters. It is made up of wood and brick, which has seven floors and eight faces.
