= Zhonglou, Changzhou =

Zhonglou 钟楼区
- District
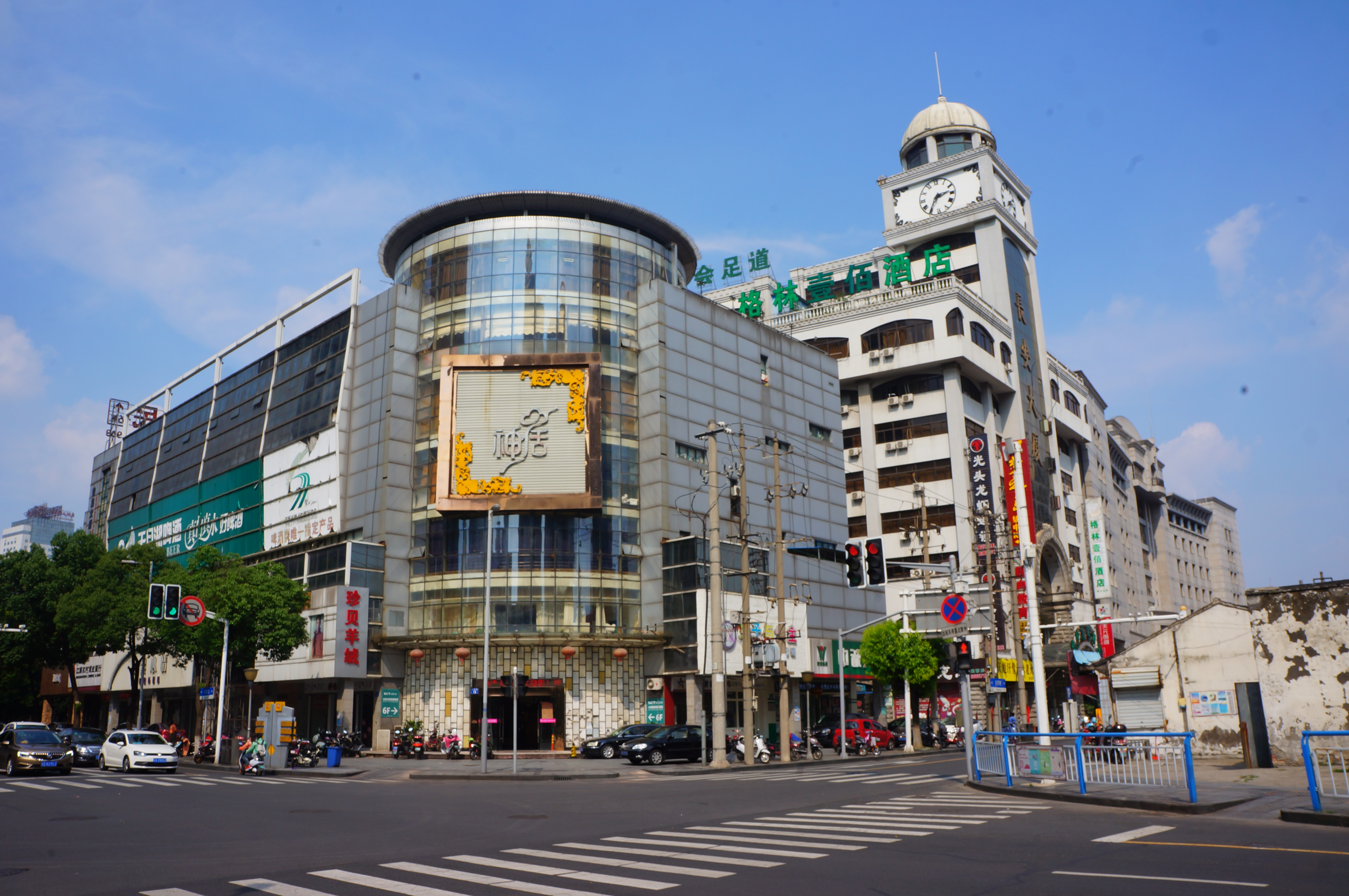
- Clock tower located near Qingguo Lane

- Location in Jiangsu
- Coordinates: 31°47′41″N 119°54′32″E
- Country: People's Republic of China
- Province: Jiangsu
- Prefecture-level city: Changzhou

Area
  - District: 133 km^{2} (51 sq mi)

Population (2020)
  - District: 658,537
  - Density: 4,950/km^{2} (12,800/sq mi)
  - Urban: 615,112
- Time zone: UTC+8 (China Standard)
- Postal code: 213000

Zhonglou District (simplified Chinese: 钟楼区; traditional Chinese: 鐘樓區; pinyin: Zhōnglóu Qū; lit. 'Clock tower') is one of five districts under the jurisdiction of Changzhou in Jiangsu province of the People's Republic of China. The local language is the Changzhou dialect of Wu Chinese. The postal code for the district is 213002. Zhonglou covers an area of 71 square kilometers. In 2020 the total population was recorded at 658,537 people.

It is also the location of the Nan Da Jie shopping mall (Chinese: 南大街; pinyin: Nán Dà Jiē; lit. 'South Avenue'), one of the unofficial centers of the city. Nan Da Jie is home to many restaurants and chain stores as well as a number of educational companies and apartment complexes.

The district takes its name from a large belfry that once stood in the area.

== Administrative divisions ==
At present, Zhonglou District has 7 subdistricts.

7 subdistricts

- Wuxing (五星街道)
- Yonghong (永红街道)
- Beigang (北港街道)
- Xilin (西林街道)
- Hehuachi (荷花池街道)
- Nandajie (南大街街道)
- Xinzha (新闸街道)
