= Dongpo Park =

Park in Changzhou, China

Su Park, also called Dongpo Park is located in the eastern of Changzhou, an area of 2.667 hectares. It is the typical garden of southern Changjiang delta combined of natural scenery and places of interest. In the Song dynasty, people of Changzhou built ”boat outfitting, Pavilion” as a souvenir in order to commemorate the boating tour of the literary giant Su Dongpo here.

== Legend ==
There's a legend says that Changzhou is a place full of elites and talents. In order not to cause the eastern drain of young talents, so they build dams on the Grand Canal to make the river around a big bend to the East.

== Su ==
Su has been eleven to Changzhou, and finally end up in Changzhou, but actually he only departed the boat here twice, once in 1073, he went from Hangzhou to Zhenjiang through Changzhou. In wild places outside Changzhou, he made a famous poem. The second time was in 1101 he returned from Hainan. The weather was hot, he drew a fantastic picture. At night, he went sightseeing around the canal. It was said at that time the bank was full of people and took the city by storm. Into the garden door, I saw white walls separating the mountain. Portal for box King, leaking window is by the King, the corridor is connected with Bamboo planting flowers and trees, have caused layers, showing a style of classical gardens. Bypass a corridor, suddenly see the light with heavily timbered, what a wonderful scenery!
