= Changzhou =

Changzhou 常州市 Changchow
- Prefecture-level city
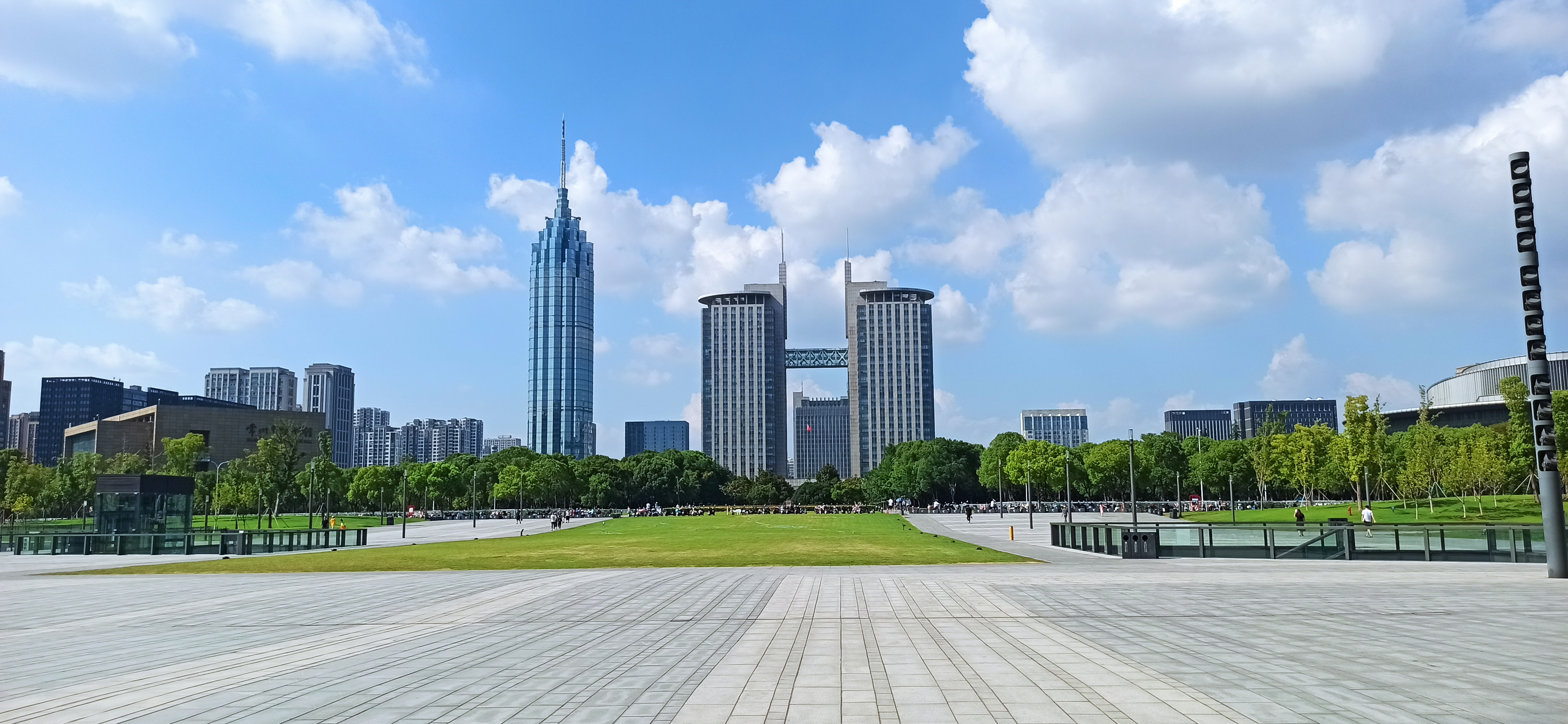
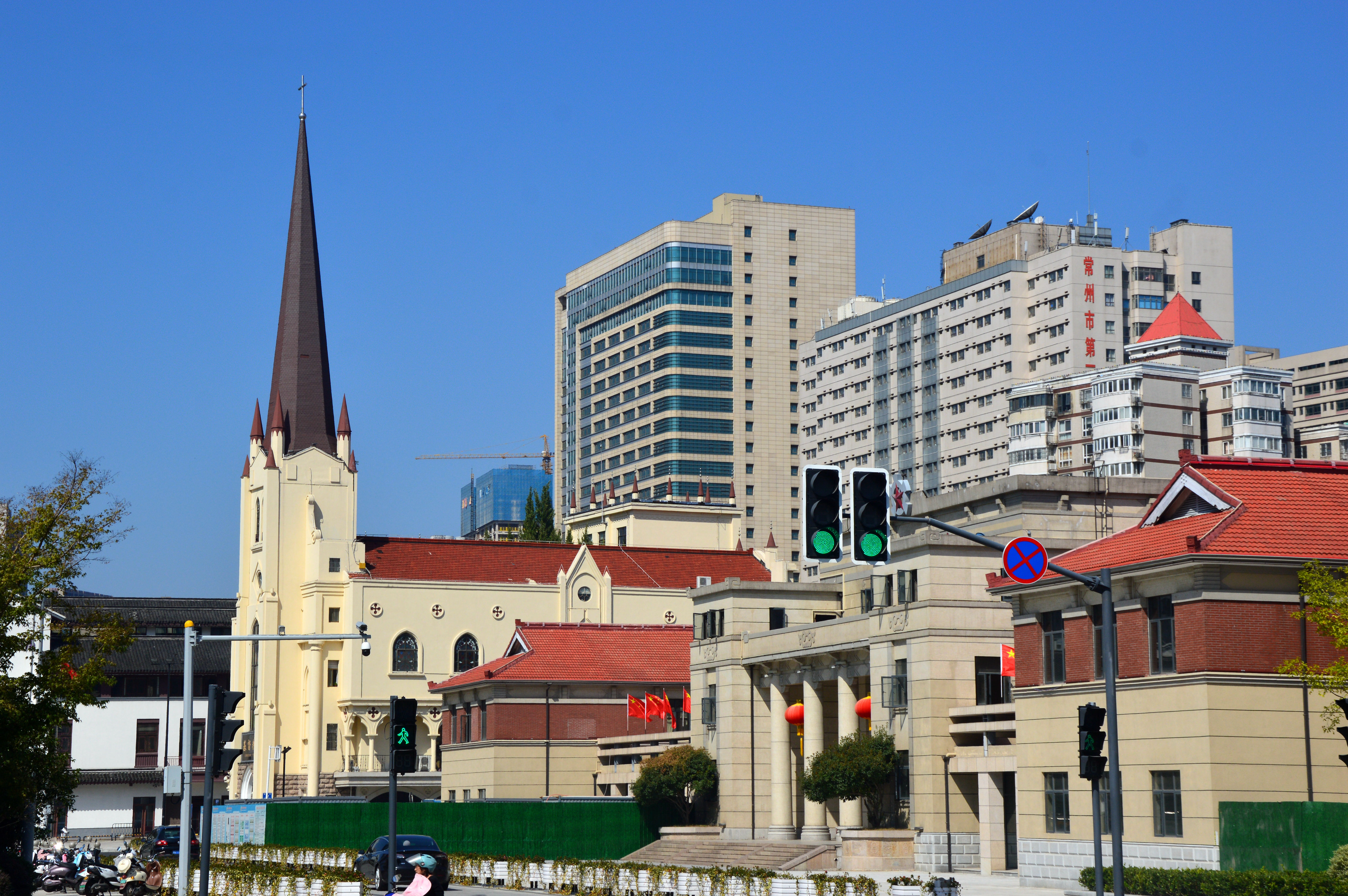
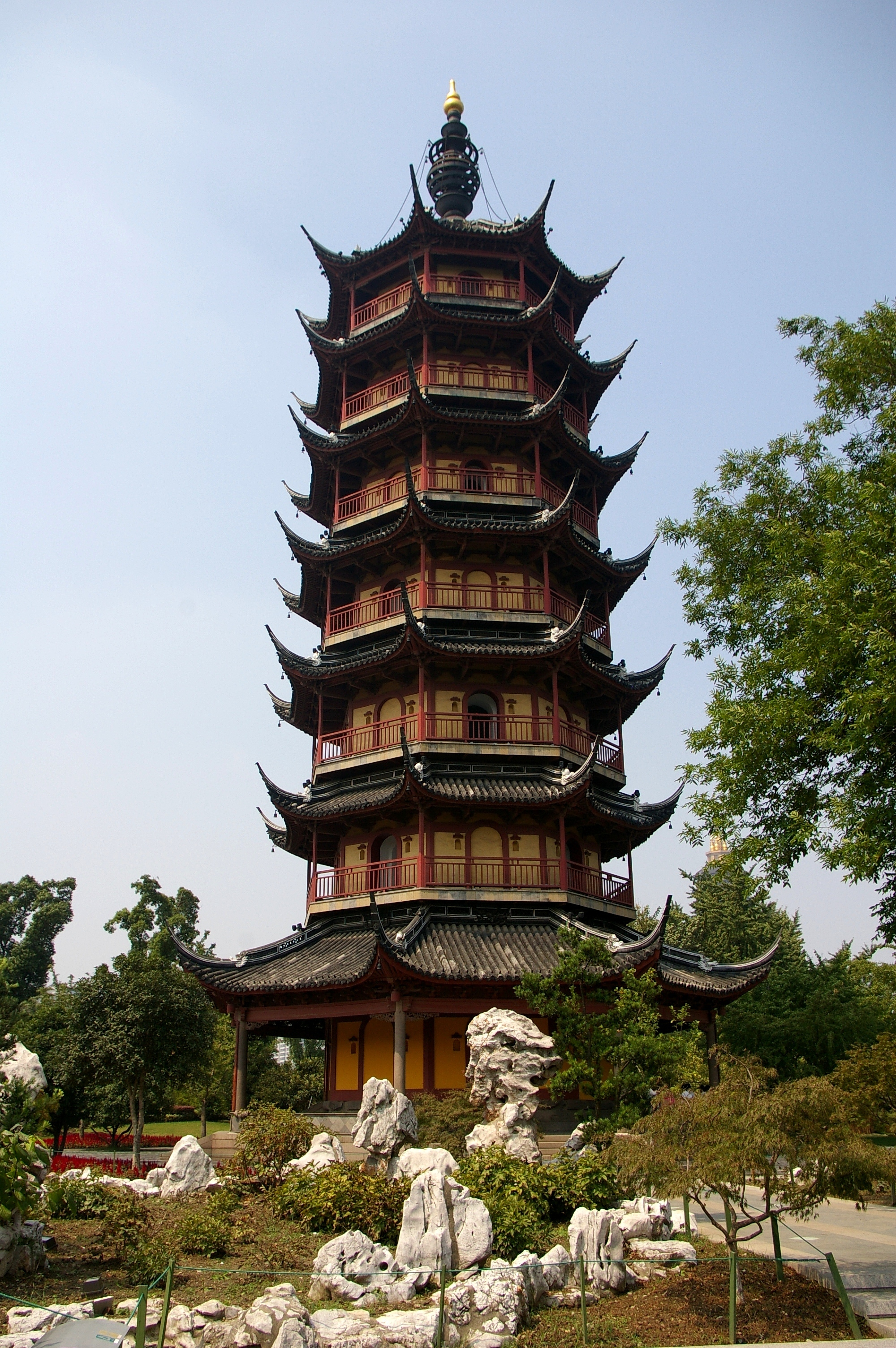
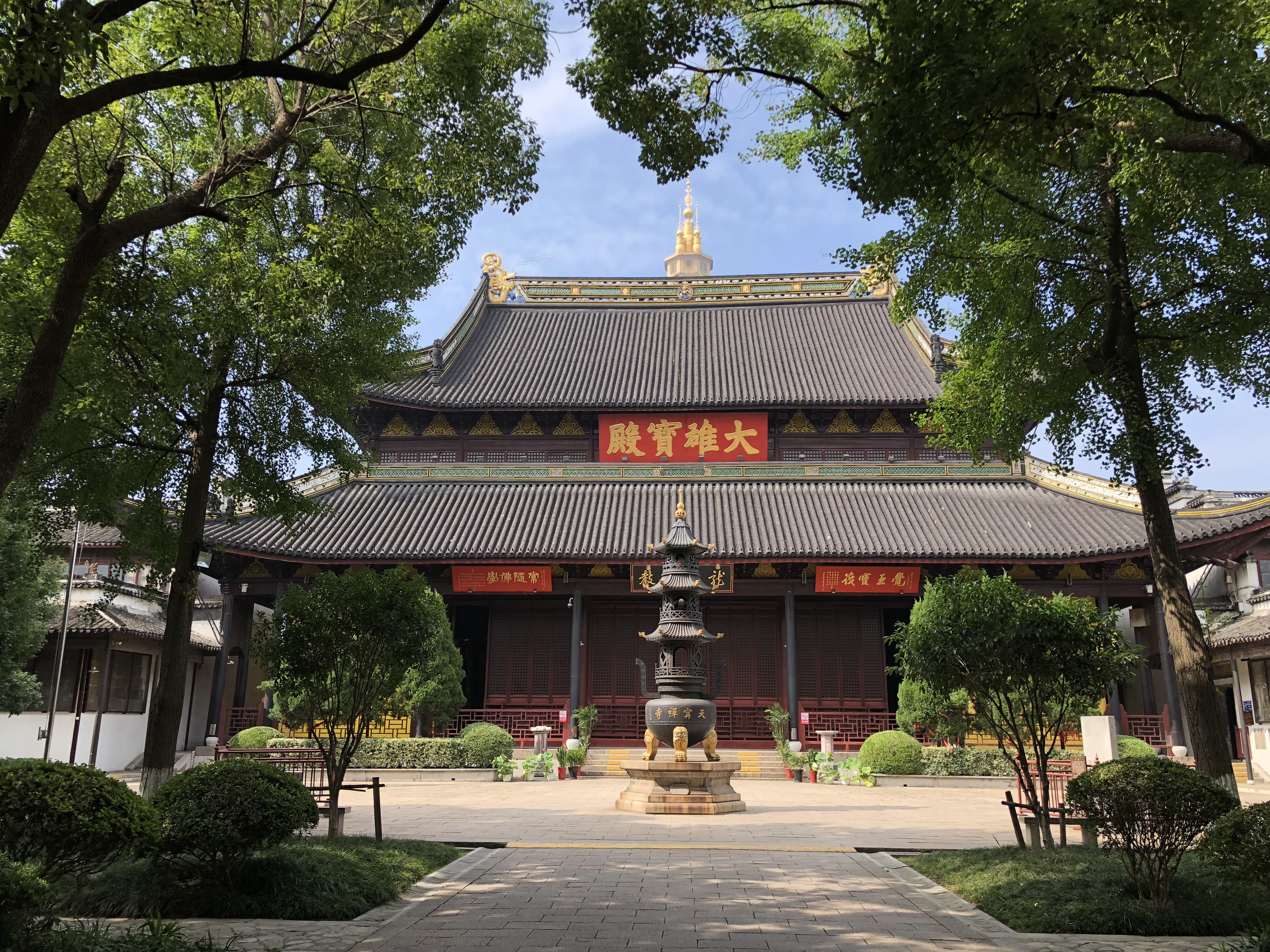
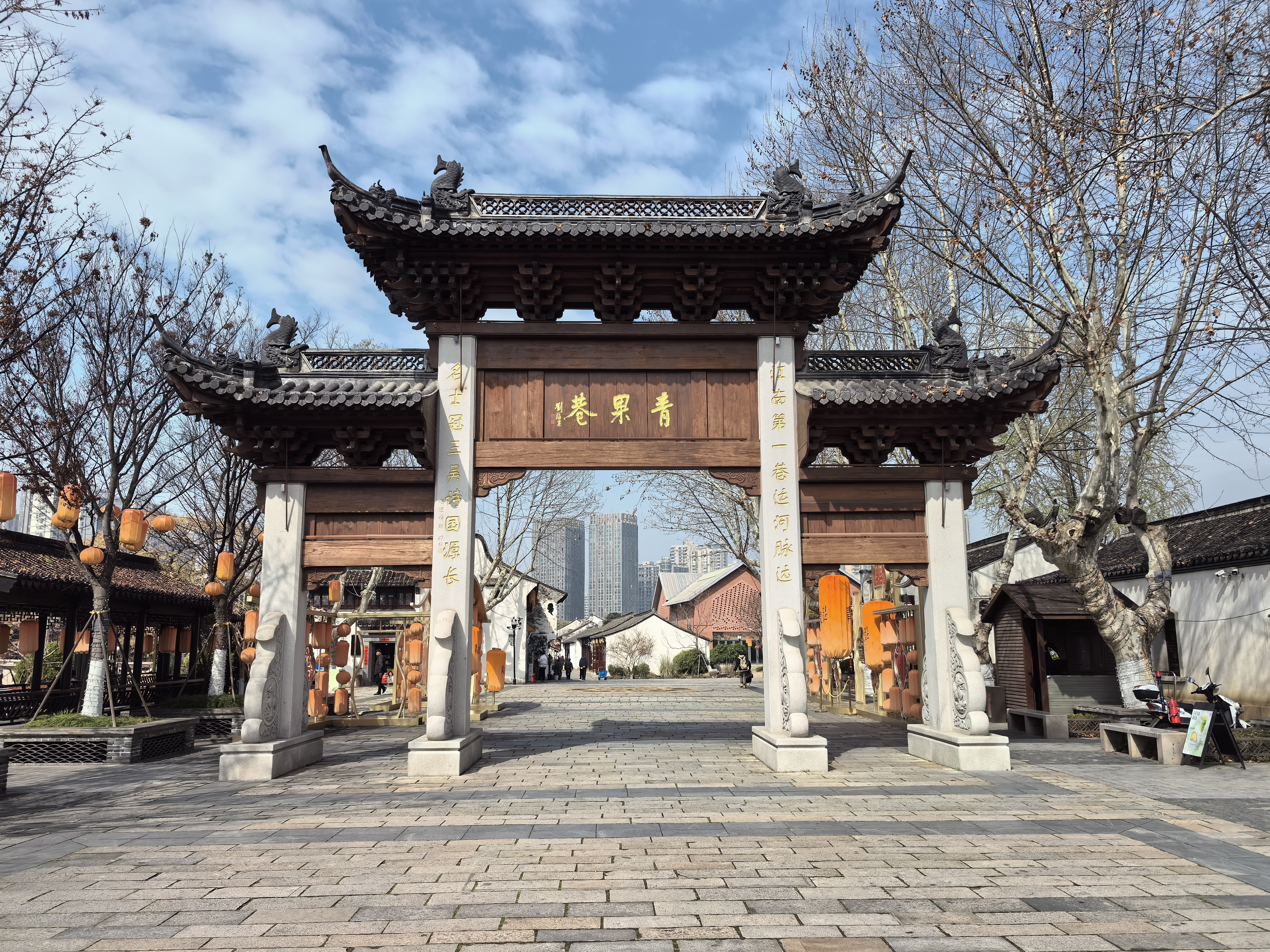
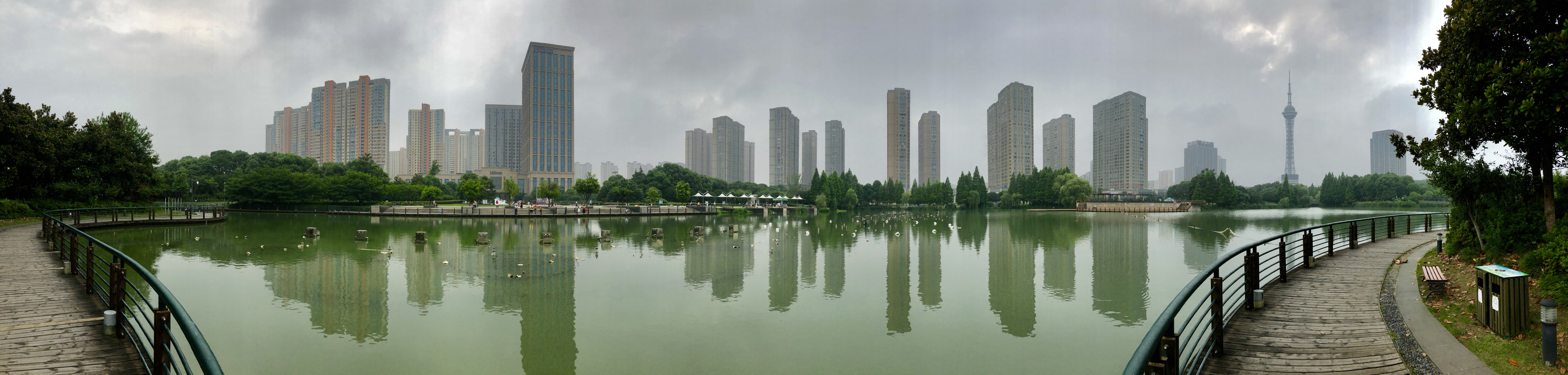
- The Changzhou Municipal Government building (right) and the Modern Media Center (left) Worker's Cultural Palace Wenbi Tower Tianning Temple Qingguo Lane Xintiandi Park
- Interactive map of Changzhou
- Location of the city center in China Changzhou (Eastern China) Changzhou (China)
- Coordinates (Changzhou municipal government): 31°48′40″N 119°58′26″E
- Country: China
- Province: Jiangsu
- Municipal seat: Xinbei District
- Divisions: 5 districts, 1 city

Government
  - Party Secretary: Li Baiping (李佰平)
  - Mayor: Zhou Wei (周伟)

Area
  - Prefecture-level city: 4,384.58 km^{2} (1,692.90 sq mi)
  - Urban: 1,872.1 km^{2} (722.8 sq mi)

Population (2020 census)
  - Prefecture-level city: 5,278,121
  - Density: 1,203.79/km^{2} (3,117.81/sq mi)
  - Urban: 3,601,079
  - Urban density: 1,923.6/km^{2} (4,982.0/sq mi)
  - Metro: 12,400,000

GDP
  - Prefecture-level city: CN¥ 705 billion US$ 106.7 billion
  - Per capita: CN¥149,275; US$22,600
- Time zone: UTC+8 (China Standard)
- Postal code: 213000, 213100 (Urban center); 213200, 213300 (Other areas)
- Area code: 0519
- ISO 3166 code: CN-JS-04
- License Plate Prefix: 苏D
- Local dialect: Wu: Changzhou dialect
- Website: changzhou.gov.cn

Changzhou is a prefecture-level city in southern Jiangsu, China. It was previously known as Yanling, Lanling, and Jinling. Located on the southern bank of the Yangtze River, Changzhou borders the provincial capital of Nanjing to the west, Zhenjiang to the northwest, Wuxi to the east, and the province of Zhejiang to the south. The population of the Changzhou Municipality was 5,278,121 at the 2020 census. The city is the birthplace of Zhou Youguang who created the pinyin romanization system.

Changzhou
- "Changzhou" in Chinese
- Chinese: 常州
Transcriptions
Standard Mandarin
- Hanyu Pinyin: Chángzhōu
- Bopomofo: ㄔㄤˊ ㄓㄡ
- Gwoyeu Romatzyh: Charngjou
- Wade–Giles: Ch'ang^{2}-chou^{1}
- Tongyong Pinyin: Cháng-jhou
- IPA: [ʈʂʰǎŋ.ʈʂóʊ]
Wu
- Romanization: Zaontsei (Changzhounese)

== History ==
Human activity in the Changzhou region can be traced back more than 6,000 years to the Neolithic Majiabang culture. The Weidun (previously known as Yudun, 圩墩) site, located in the region, is one of the northernmost major sites of that culture and contains a large cemetery whose use continued into the subsequent Songze culture.

By the Liangzhu period, the region was characterized by the Sidun (寺墩) site, a polity covering approximately 900,000 square meters. The settlement was organized around a central earthen altar, roughly 100 meters in diameter and 20 meters high, surrounded by multiple moats and distinct cemetery clusters. Notably excavations of a high-status burial at the site yielded an assemblage of 57 jade artifacts, including bi discs and cong tubes.

During the late Spring and Autumn period, the walled site of Yancheng (淹城) was constructed in the region. The site, roughly 850 meters across, is noted for its three concentric systems of walls and moats. Because clear evidence of ordinary habitation is limited, scholars have proposed various interpretations of Yancheng's function: as a ritual center, or a stronghold associated with a local chiefdom later absorbed into the Wu sphere. Ancient written accounts, by contrast, identify it as a Wu settlement and sometimes connect it with Prince Jizha (季札) of Wu.

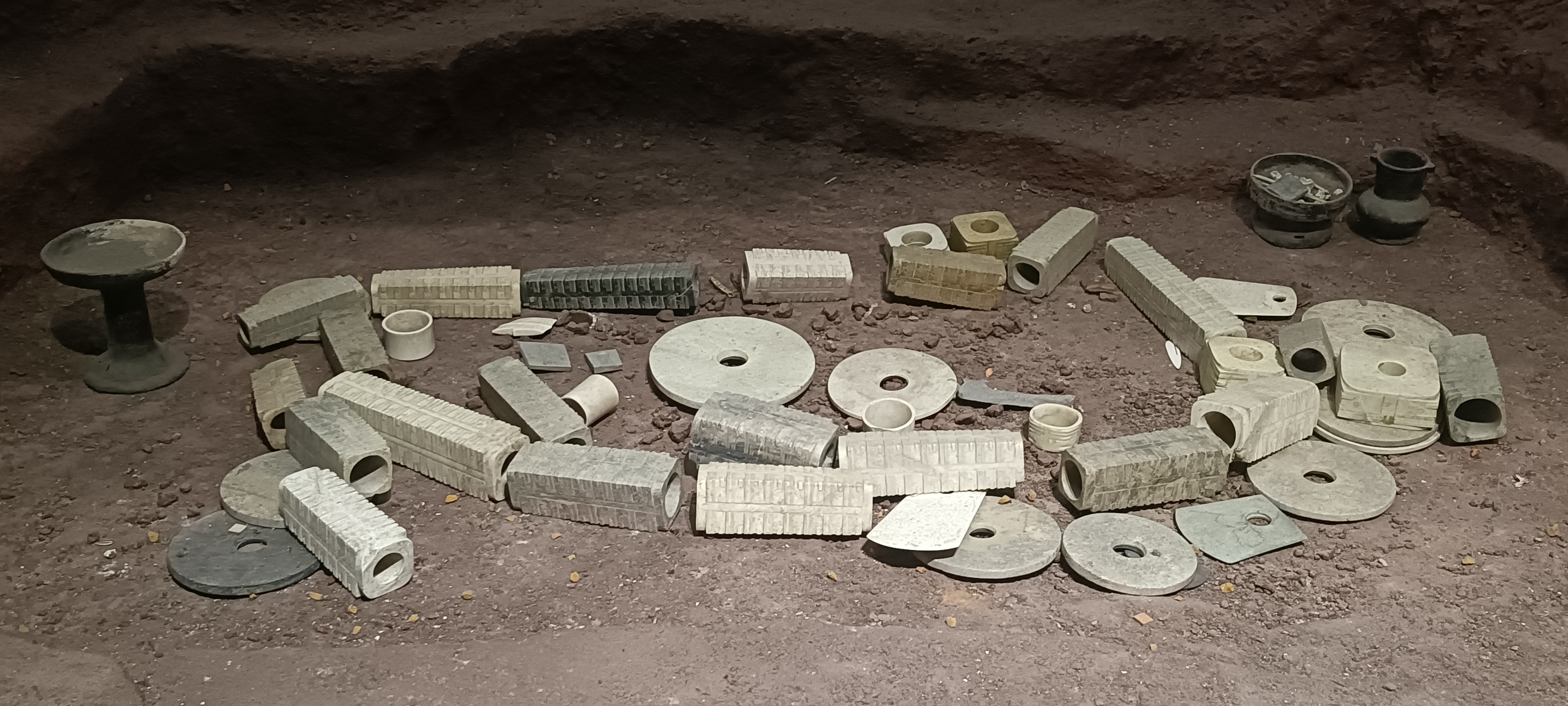
A high-status burial (Tomb No. 3) at the Liangzhu Sidun site, showing the ritual arrangement of jade bi and cong.

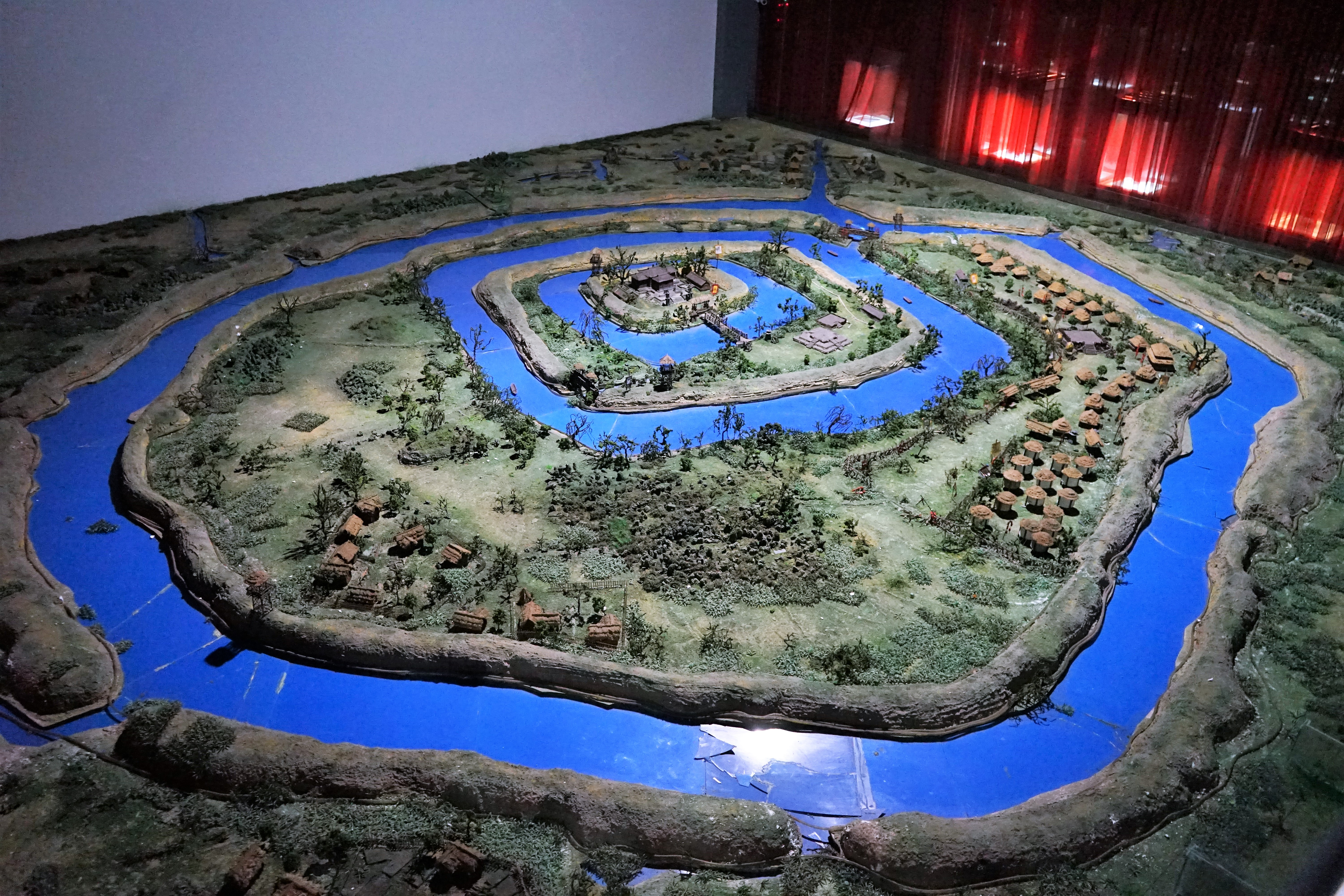
Scale model of Yancheng, illustrating the "three concentric walls and moats" layout.

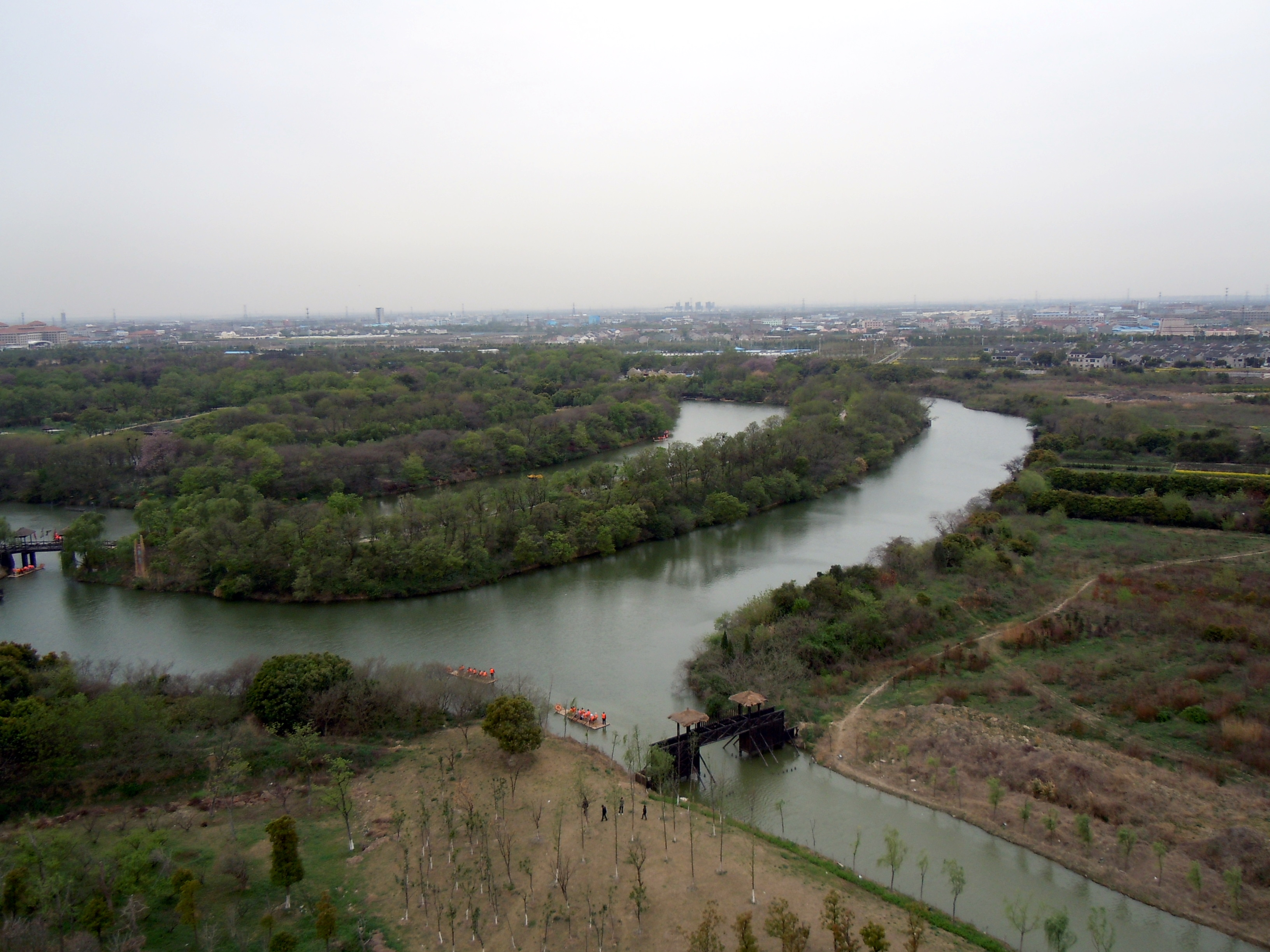
The preserved moats and earthen ramparts of the Yancheng site today.

Changzhou is traditionally associated with Prince Jizha, who reportedly settled in Yanling (延陵) —an area encompassing modern Changzhou—after declining the Wu throne. While early records focus on his self-imposed exile, later traditions treat Yanling as his formal fief. His reputation for integrity made him a central figure in the city's identity; the veneration of "Master Ji of Yanling" persisted throughout imperial China, as evidenced by numerous local temples dedicated to him.

Following the completion of the Grand Canal in 609, Changzhou prospered as a stop along its course. During the interregnum between the Sui and Tang, the city of Piling (毗陵) was the capital of Shen Faxing's short-lived Liang Kingdom (619–620).

In spring 1275, Mongol forces briefly occupied Changzhou after its surrender on 8 April, but the city reverted to Southern Song control a week later. In autumn, the Mongols launched a siege lasting about 45 days. On 5 December, commander Bayan issued an ultimatum: surrender for amnesty or face annihilation. After one day, the Mongols breached the city on 6 December and ordered a general massacre; only some 400 women and children were reportedly spared. The operation may have intimidated the Song populace and prompted other cities to surrender smoothly to avoid a similar outcome.

Changzhou served as a prefectural seat (fu) of Ming Nanzhili and the Qing provinces of Jiangnan and Jiangsu. In the 1850s and 1860s, the Taiping Rebellion held the area. One of five palaces housing the leaders of Taiping was constructed in Changzhou. Today the ruins of the "King's Palace" can be found near the People's No. 1 Hospital.

In the 1920s, Changzhou started to attract cotton mills. The cotton industry got a boost in the late 1930s when businesses began relocating outside of Shanghai due to its Japanese occupation. On January 1, 1953, Changzhou was set as a provincially administered municipality.

As approved by State Council on June 8, 1995, Wujin County was promoted to Wujin City, with the government set in Hutang Town. In 1999, as approved by the provincial government, Taixiang Town of Jiaoqu District was revoked and incorporated into Xueyan Town of Wujin City.

== Geography ==
Changzhou is located in the Yangtze Delta region, in the northwestern part of the Taihu Lake Plain. It is bordered by the Yangtze River in the north, Taihu Lake in the south, Anhui province and Nanjing in the southwest, Wuxi in the east and Zhenjiang in the west. It is equidistant from Shanghai and Nanjing, and 144 kilometres from the provincial capital Nanjing. Southwest of the Yili mountains, mountain peaks have Maoshan.

Changzhou has Tao Lake and Ge Lake. Rivers are Beijing–Hangzhou Grand Canal, Wuyi Canal, Tai Ge Canal, Jingxi, South Canal and so on. Changzhou has a dense network of waterways, and in the 1930s, when flooding broke out in the southern part of the Yangtze River, Zhou Chen went to the southern part of the Yangtze River to control the water, he greatly promoted the enclosure of lakes to create fields. The local government created 2,467 hectares (6,100 acres) of land in 20 years, making Furong Lake, Yang Lake and Linjin Lake gradually shrink to the point of disappearing.

=== Climate ===
The climate is humid subtropical Cfa, with cool winters and hot and humid summers. Changzhou has a wide range of temperature differences throughout the year.

Climate data for Changzhou, elevation 4 m (13 ft), (1991–2020 normals, extremes 1955–present)
Month	Jan	Feb	Mar	Apr	May	Jun	Jul	Aug	Sep	Oct	Nov	Dec	Year
Record high °C (°F)	21.2 (70.2)	26.7 (80.1)	33.6 (92.5)	33.6 (92.5)	37.3 (99.1)	37.8 (100.0)	40.6 (105.1)	40.3 (104.5)	38.2 (100.8)	37.7 (99.9)	29.9 (85.8)	22.8 (73.0)	40.6 (105.1)
Mean daily maximum °C (°F)	7.5 (45.5)	9.9 (49.8)	14.7 (58.5)	21.0 (69.8)	26.3 (79.3)	29.0 (84.2)	32.6 (90.7)	32.1 (89.8)	28.1 (82.6)	22.9 (73.2)	16.8 (62.2)	10.1 (50.2)	20.9 (69.7)
Daily mean °C (°F)	3.6 (38.5)	5.7 (42.3)	10.1 (50.2)	16.0 (60.8)	21.4 (70.5)	24.9 (76.8)	28.7 (83.7)	28.2 (82.8)	24.0 (75.2)	18.5 (65.3)	12.3 (54.1)	6.0 (42.8)	16.6 (61.9)
Mean daily minimum °C (°F)	0.7 (33.3)	2.5 (36.5)	6.4 (43.5)	11.8 (53.2)	17.3 (63.1)	21.6 (70.9)	25.6 (78.1)	25.3 (77.5)	20.8 (69.4)	15.0 (59.0)	8.8 (47.8)	2.8 (37.0)	13.2 (55.8)
Record low °C (°F)	−15.5 (4.1)	−11.5 (11.3)	−7.6 (18.3)	−1.3 (29.7)	5.7 (42.3)	11.5 (52.7)	17.0 (62.6)	17.8 (64.0)	10.4 (50.7)	1.6 (34.9)	−5.4 (22.3)	−11.2 (11.8)	−15.5 (4.1)
Average precipitation mm (inches)	59.7 (2.35)	57.5 (2.26)	80.6 (3.17)	86.0 (3.39)	95.8 (3.77)	206.8 (8.14)	217.4 (8.56)	178.4 (7.02)	84.0 (3.31)	59.4 (2.34)	54.1 (2.13)	38.9 (1.53)	1,218.6 (47.97)
Average precipitation days (≥ 0.1 mm)	9.8	9.4	11.1	10.4	11.2	12.7	12.9	12.8	8.5	7.7	8.2	7.7	122.4
Average snowy days	3.3	2.8	0.8	0	0	0	0	0	0	0	0.2	1.0	8.1
Average relative humidity (%)	75	73	71	69	70	77	78	79	77	74	75	72	74
Mean monthly sunshine hours	125.5	128.1	152.3	180.9	189.4	150.8	199.8	202.2	176.3	174.8	147.6	139.7	1,967.4
Percentage possible sunshine	39	41	41	46	44	35	46	50	48	50	47	45	44
Source 1: China Meteorological Administration all-time extreme temperature
Source 2: Weather China

== Administration ==
The prefecture-level city of Changzhou administers seven county-level divisions, including five districts and one county-level city.

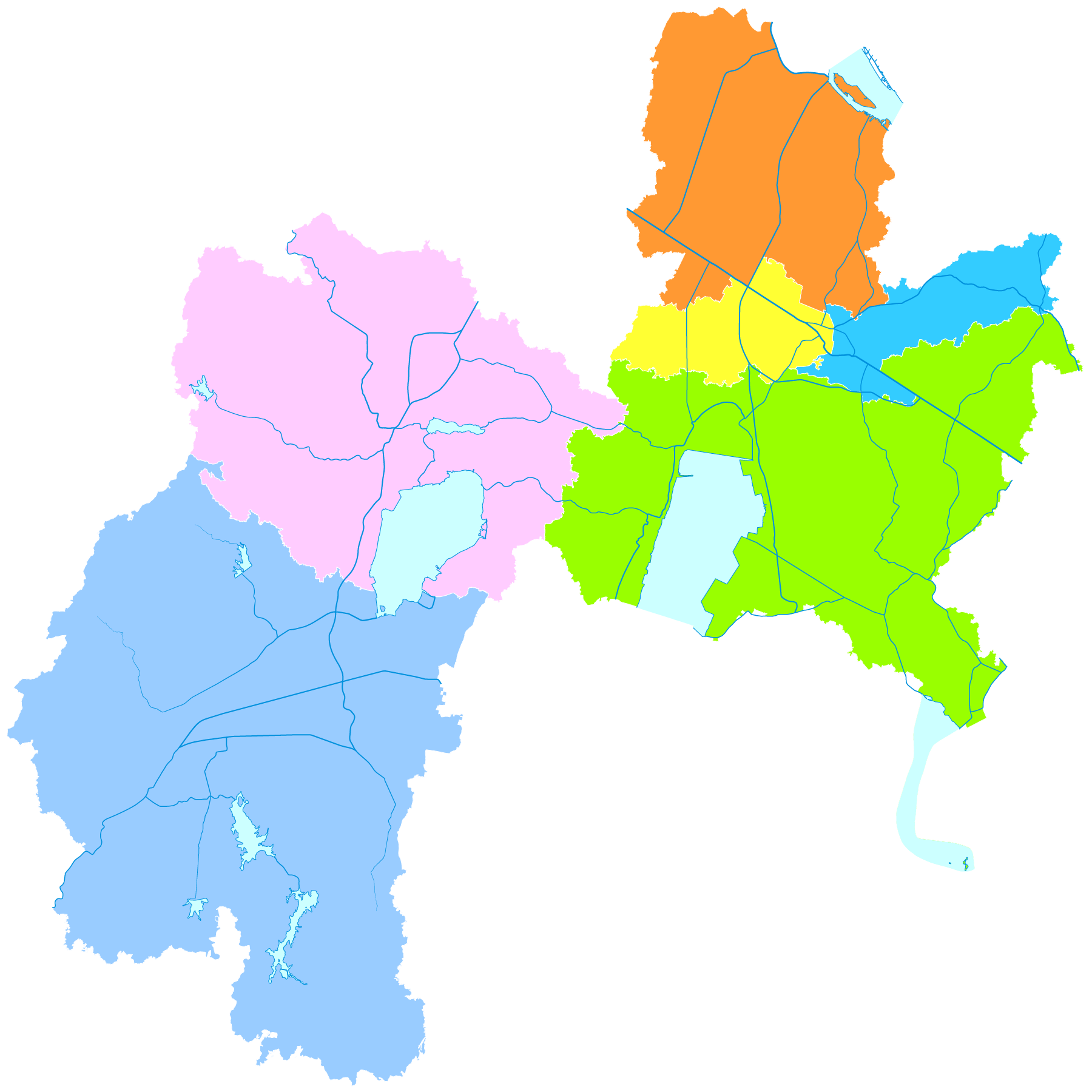

== Demographics ==
Its total population was 5,278,121 inhabitants at the 2020 census, a 1.4% annual increase since the previous census.

Population
Subdivision	Simplified Chinese	Hanyu Pinyin	Population (2020)	Area (km^{2})	Density (/km^{2})
City Proper
Tianning District	天宁区	Tiānníng Qū	668,906	154.84	3,317.50
Zhonglou District	钟楼区	Zhōnglóu Qū	658,537	132.93	3,806.03
Suburban
Xinbei District	新北区	Xīnběi Qū	883,125	508.91	1,172.72
Wujin District	武进区	Wǔjìn Qū	1,277,487	1,065.26	1,571.56
Jintan District	金坛区	Jīntán Qū	585,081	975.68	565.81
Satellite cities (County-level cities)
Liyang City	溧阳市	Lìyáng Shì	785,092	1,534.52	488.35
Total			5,278,121	4,372.15	1,050.28
Dissolved district: Qishuyan District

== Education ==
Local universities include Hohai University's Changzhou campus. Secondary schools include the Changzhou Senior High School of Jiangsu Province and the newly established Changzhou Songjianhu Senior High School.

== Transportation ==
=== Metro ===
The city's metro system, Changzhou Metro, started the operation on 21 September 2019 with the opening of Line 1. Line 2 opened on 28 June 2021.

=== Railway ===
Located just south of the Chang Jiang (Yangtze River), Changzhou station is situated on the original Beijing–Shanghai railway. Changzhou North station was completed in 2011 and is located in the north of Changzhou in the Xinbei district on the Beijing–Shanghai high-speed railway. Changzhou is also one of the main stops on the busy Shanghai–Nanjing intercity railway, with two stations located in Changzhou (Changzhou station and Qishuyan station).

=== Airport ===
Changzhou Benniu International Airport in Xinbei District is approximately 15 km (9.3 mi) from the city center.

=== Highways and expressways ===
- China National Highway 312
- Shanghai-Nanjing Expressway (part of G42 Shanghai-Chengdu Expressway)
- Yanjiang Expressway (part of G4221 Shanghai-Wuhan Expressway
- G4011 Yangzhou-Liyang Expressway
- G4012 Liyang-Ningde Expressway (Liyang only)
- G25 Changchun-Shenzhen Expressway

=== Bus rapid transport (BRT) system ===
Changzhou BRT

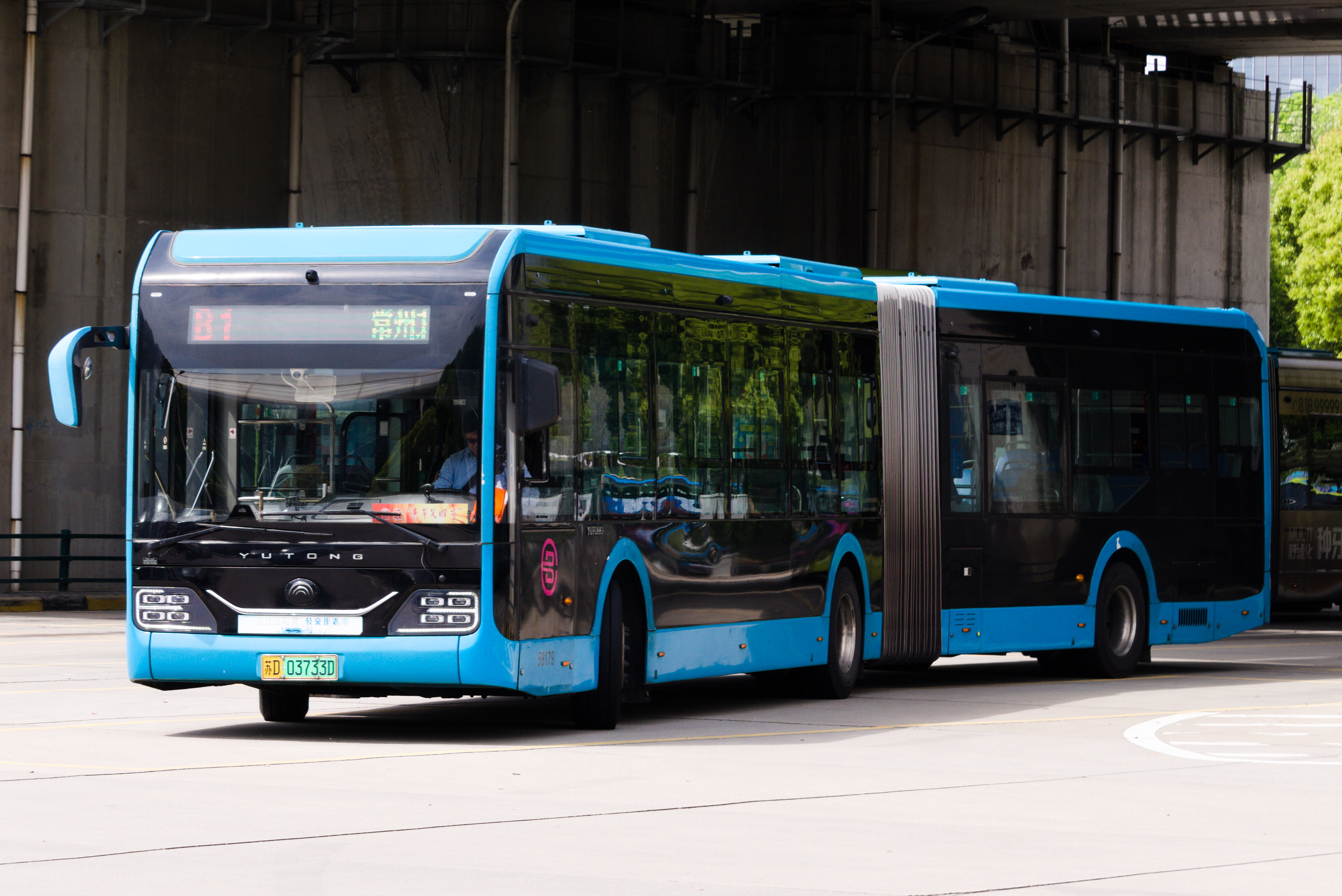
Vehicle

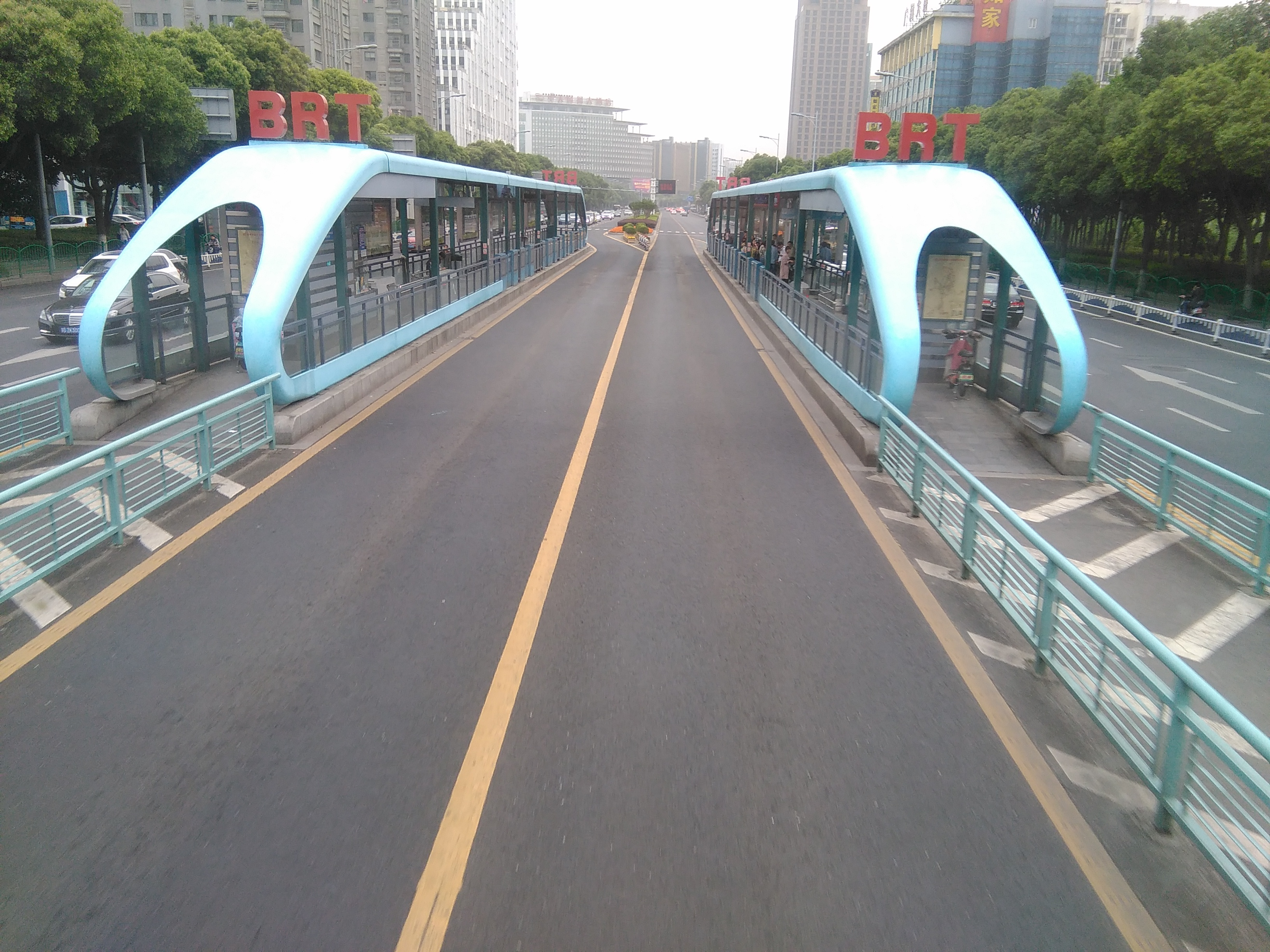
Station

Changzhou BRT is the bus rapid transit system of Changzhou which consists of 2 main lines (B1 and B2) and 8 branch lines.Use of the BRT System costs two yuan and provides access throughout Changzhou. The BRT stations and road sections have separate bus lanes or bus-only roadways, enhanced station environments (not just simple bus shelters), pre-boarding fare collection and fare verification, centralized system controls, as well as station access for disabled persons.

== Tourism ==
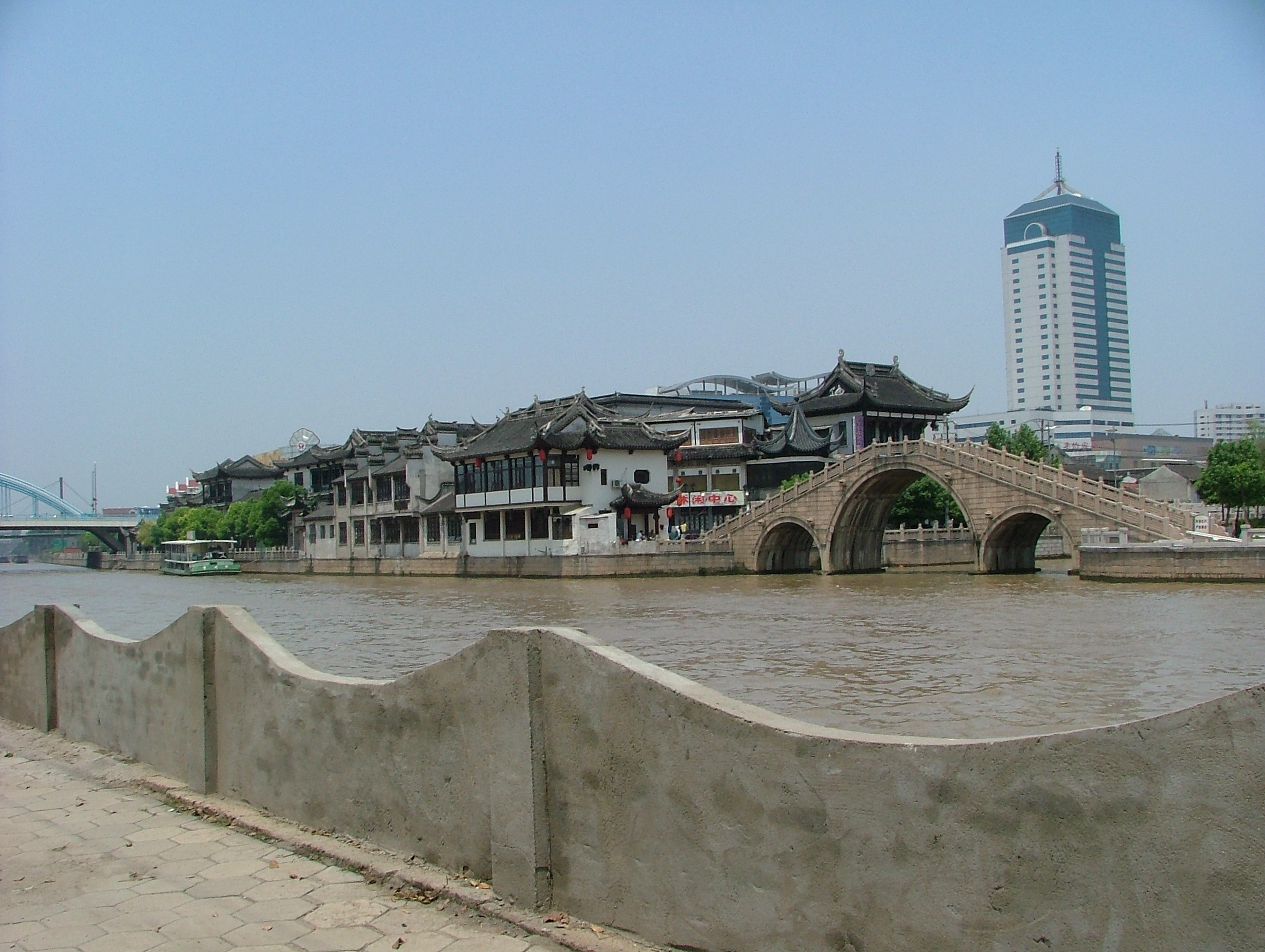
Comb Lane

=== Amusement parks ===
Changzhou is the home of the China Dinosaurs Park located in the Xinbei District of the city. The 5A rated Dinosaur Park has a collection of dinosaur bones and fossils from all over China. The park has 50 various fossils and more than 30 amusement programs including the Brontosaurus Roller Coaster and the Whirling Dinosaur Carriage. The fossils are located in a museum housed in a single building and the amusement rides are spread throughout the park which is categorized into six themed areas. Besides fossils and family oriented rides, Dinosaur Park is home to a giant panda and sea lions.

=== Tianning Temple and Hongmei Park ===
The city is also home to the Tianning Temple—one of the largest Zen Buddhist temple and monasteries in China. The city recently rebuilt the Tianning pagoda in the temple grounds, which is adjacent to Hongmei Park. The pagoda, called the Tianning Baota, was first built during the Tang dynasty (AD 618 – 907). Since that time it has been destroyed and rebuilt five times. The current reconstruction is built to the height specification of 153.79 m (504.6 ft). This makes it the tallest pagoda in China and perhaps also the world. Both the Hongmei Park and Tianning Temple are located just to the east of the city centre.

=== Other attractions ===
- The Old Museum of Wisteria
- Canal 5 Creative Campus

== Gallery ==
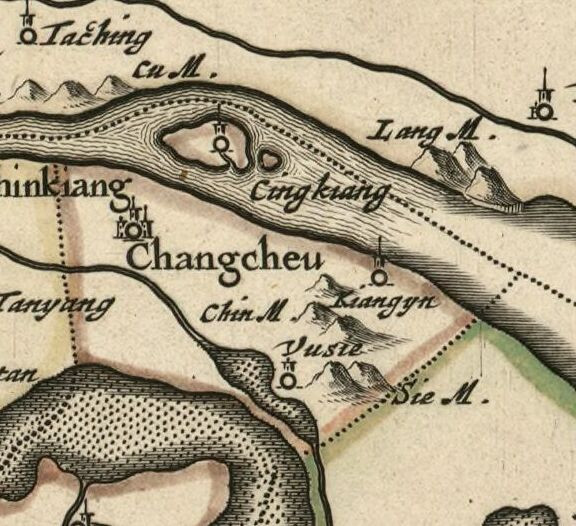
Changcheu Prefecture between the Yangtze and Lake Tai, from Martino Martini's 1655 Novus Atlas Sinensis.

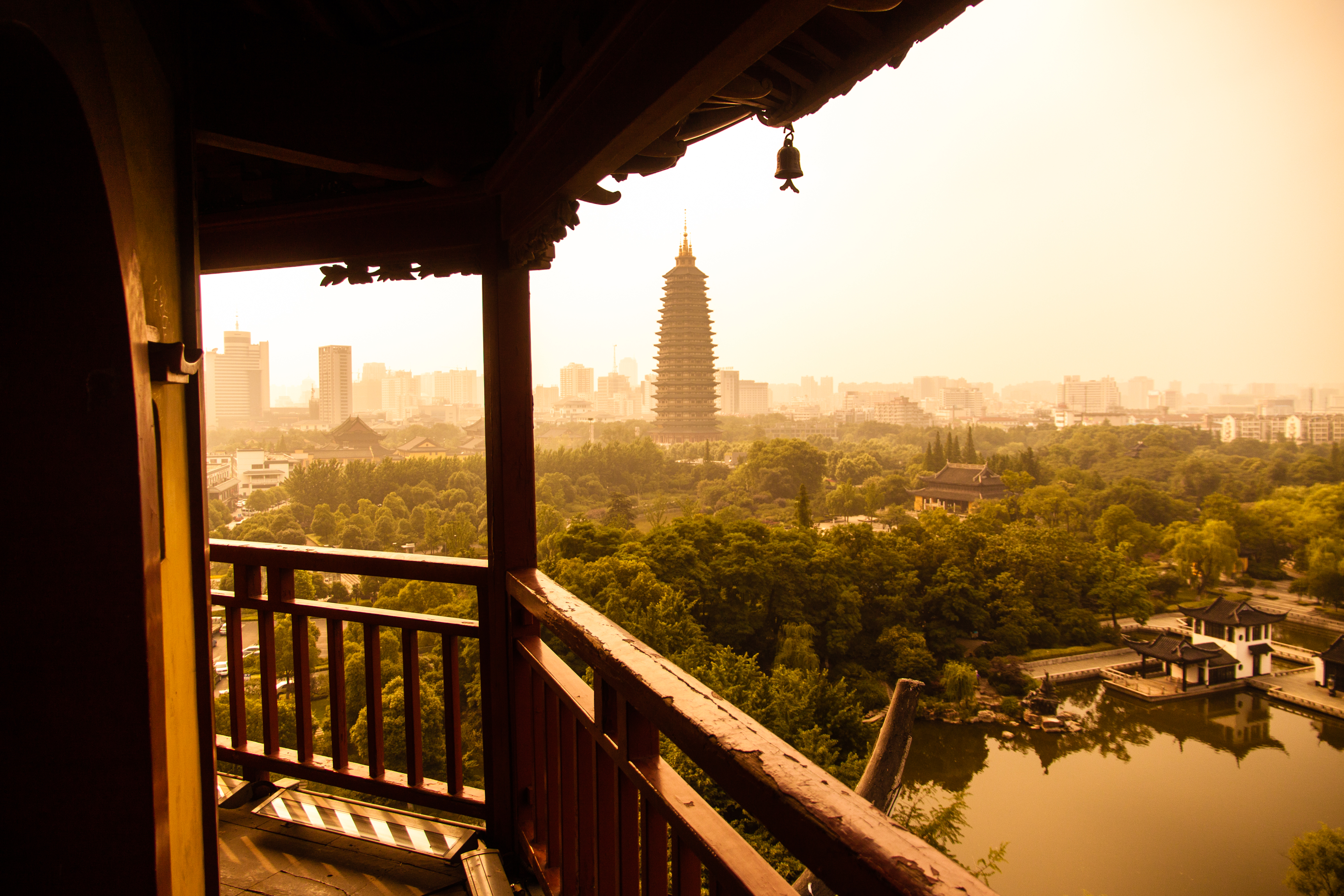
The parks and pagodas of the old city of Changzhou.

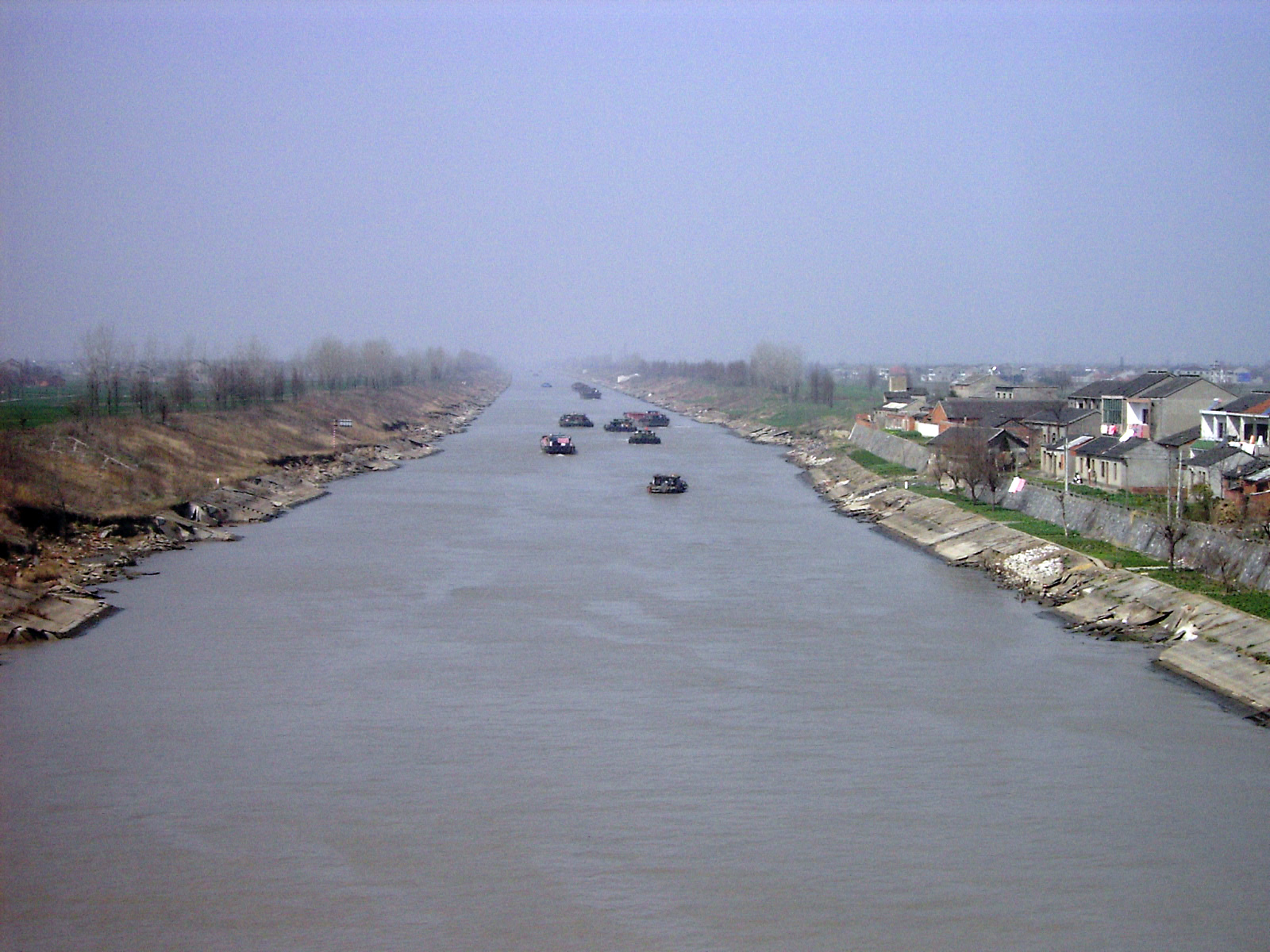
The Grand Canal at Changzhou in 2006.

== Sister cities ==
- Beau Bassin-Rose Hill, Mauritius
- Buffalo, New York, United States
- Chuncheon, South Korea
- Dar es Salaam, Tanzania
- Eskişehir, Turkey
- Essen, Germany
- Jelenia Gora, Poland
- Johor Bahru, Malaysia
- La Serena, Chile
- Lommel, Belgium
- Minden, Germany
- Namyangju, South Korea
- Netanya, Israel
- Prato, Italy
- Rockford, Illinois, United States
- Satakunta, Finland
- Solihull, England
- Stavropol, Russia
- Takatsuki, Osaka Prefecture, Japan
- Tilburg, Netherlands
- Tokorozawa, Japan
- Torrington, Connecticut, United States
- Wyndham, Australia

== Notable people ==
- Su Dongpo (Su Shi; 1036–1101), poet and essayist.
- Sheng Xuanhuai (1844–1916), late Qing dynasty bureaucrat and reformer.
- Lü Simian (1884–1957), historian and member of the Doubting Antiquity School
- Zhao Yuanren (1892–1982), linguist.
- Hong Shen (1894–1955), pioneering dramatist and filmmaker.
- Yun Daiying (1895–1931), revolutionary and pioneer of early Communist Youth activities.
- Liu Haisu (1896–1994), artist.
- Zhang Tailei (1898–1927), one of the founders of Chinese Communist Party (CCP), first Chinese ever working in Communist International.
- Qu Qiubai (1899–1935), former General Secretary of the Chinese Communist Party and prominent Marxist thinker and writer. Named "Changzhou San Jie" together with Yun Daiying and Zhang Tailei.
- Zhou Youguang (1906–2017), linguist often credited as the "father of Hanyu Pinyin"
- Hua Luogeng (1910–1985), mathematician.
- Xie Zhiliu (1910–1997), painter.
- Yuan-Cheng Fung (1919–2019), professor and author. A founder of biomechanics.
- Tang Jun, former President of Microsoft in China.
- Lu Lan (1987–), Olympic athlete and badminton player. Won the woman's championship at the 2009 BWF World Championships.
- Bai Lu (1994–), actress, model and singer.
- Yang Li, human rights activist.

== Media ==
In the film Pacific Rim, Changzhou is credited as the city the jaeger Crimson Typhoon was assembled in.

== See also ==
- List of twin towns and sister cities in China
- Chinese frigate Changzhou
