= Qingguo Lane =

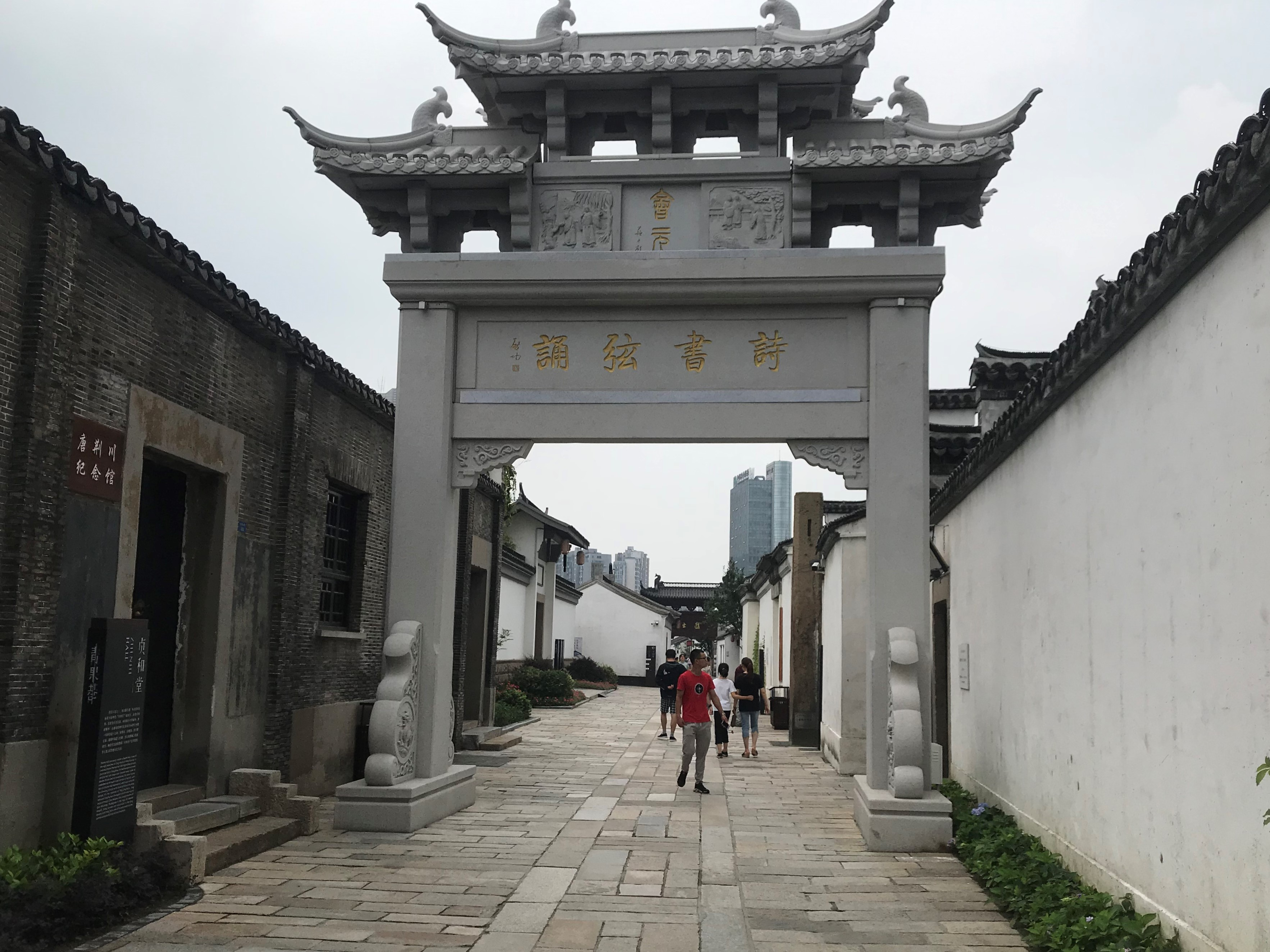
Qingguo Lane in July 2019

Qingguo Lane is located in the middle-south of Changzhou's old city, which starts from Heping Road to the South Main Street, Changzhou's famous commercial street. It is one of the oldest lanes in Changzhou, which was built in the Wanli Period of the Ming dynasty (1368-1644) in 1581.

As Qingguo Lane at that time, joined the grand canal between Beijing and Hangzhou, which is one of the longest and oldest canals in the world, many ships gathered there and made it a distribution center of fruit. There were also many fruit stores along the bank. So, Qingguo Lane also has an old name, which is Qianguo Lane. After many years the canal diversed, but the lane's name remained. In Changzhou dialect, qian and qing is difficult to distinguish in pronunciation, which made the name now.

Qingguo Lane is famous for hundreds years of residence at Bagui Hall. Many famous people once lived there including one time leader of the Chinese Communist Party Qu Qiubai, and military strategist Tang Jingchuan, who was born in Wujing, Changzhou.

Recently, Changzhou's planning bureau has put more and more emphasis on the protection of Qingguo Lane. The bureau has finished the scheme of the protection, which is respond to Qingguo Lane's historical cultural street.

Qingguo Lane is the lane of traditional opera, of calligraphy and writing, of industrialists and educators, of revolutionists and has many ancestral temples.
