= Tianning Temple (Changzhou) =

Buddhist temple in Changzhou, China

- 天宁寺
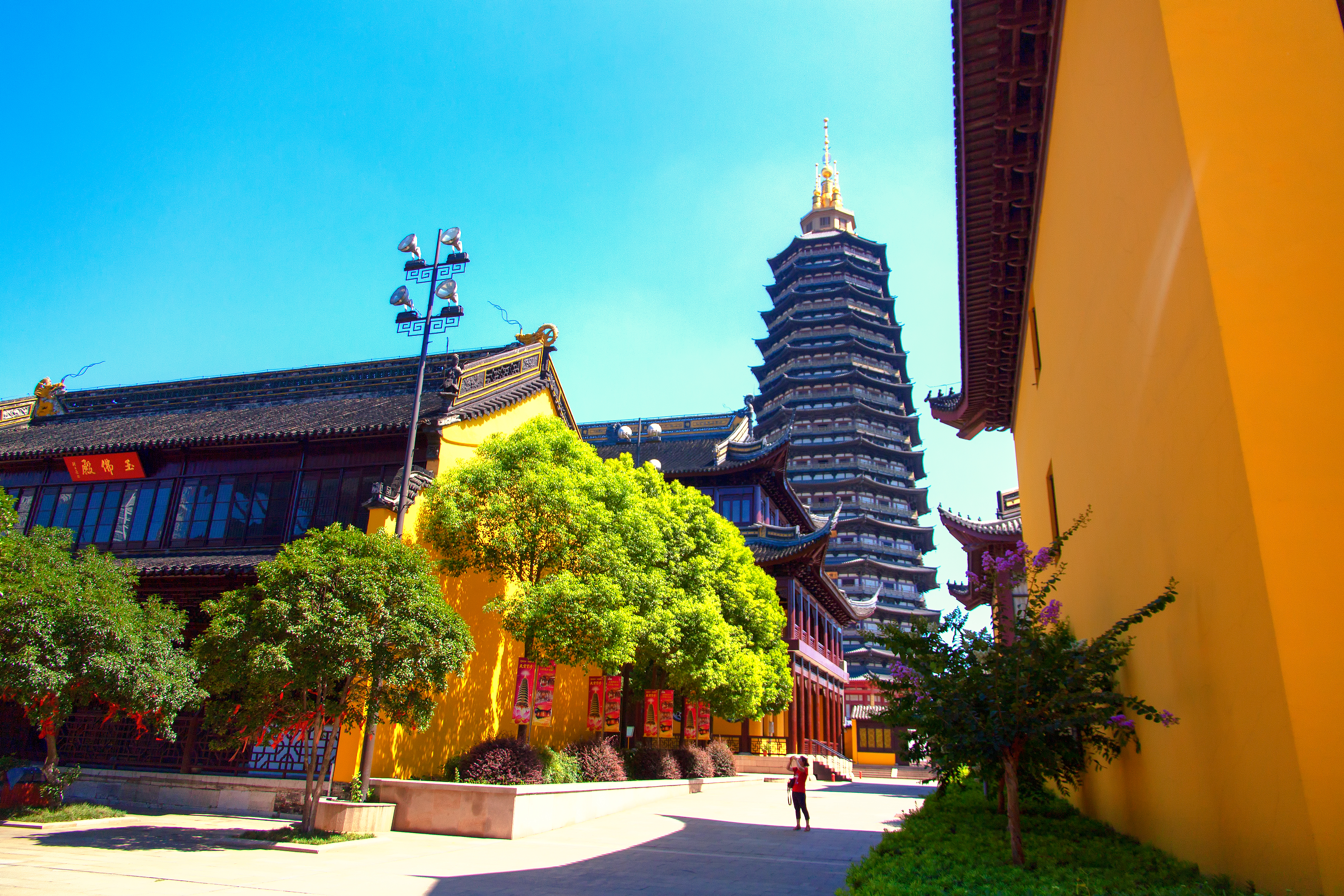
- The Tianning Temple with the Tianning Pagoda

- Location within Jiangsu

Religion
- Affiliation: Buddhism

Location
- Location: Changzhou, Jiangsu
- Country: China
- Coordinates: 31°46′37″N 119°57′55″E

Architecture
- Style: Chinese architecture
- Founder: Niutou Farong
- Established: 650–655

The Tianning Temple (simplified Chinese: 天宁寺; traditional Chinese: 天寧寺; pinyin: Tiānníng Sì; Wu: Thie^{平}nin^{去}zy^{去}) is a Buddhist temple located in Changzhou City, Jiangsu Province, China, is noted for its giant pagoda, the Tianning Pagoda (天宁宝塔/天寧宝塔). Construction began in April 2002 with the opening ceremony for the completed structure held on April 30, 2007, where a crowd of hundreds of Buddhist monks gathered for the ceremony. With 13 stories and a height of 153.79 metres (505 ft), this is now the tallest pagoda in the world, taller than China's tallest existent pre-modern Buddhist pagoda, the Liaodi Pagoda built in 1055 at a height of 84 m (275 ft). Although the existing pagoda was built by April 2007, the temple grounds and the pagoda have a history of construction and destruction for the past 1,350 years, since the time of the Tang dynasty (618–907). Building of the pagoda was proposed by the Buddhist Association of China in 2001, yet providing money donations for the temple was an international effort, as leaders of 108 Buddhist associations and temples worldwide attended the opening ceremony at the temple.

On 25 May 2006 the lower levels of the pagoda caught fire. However, no permanent damage was done.

== Structural features ==
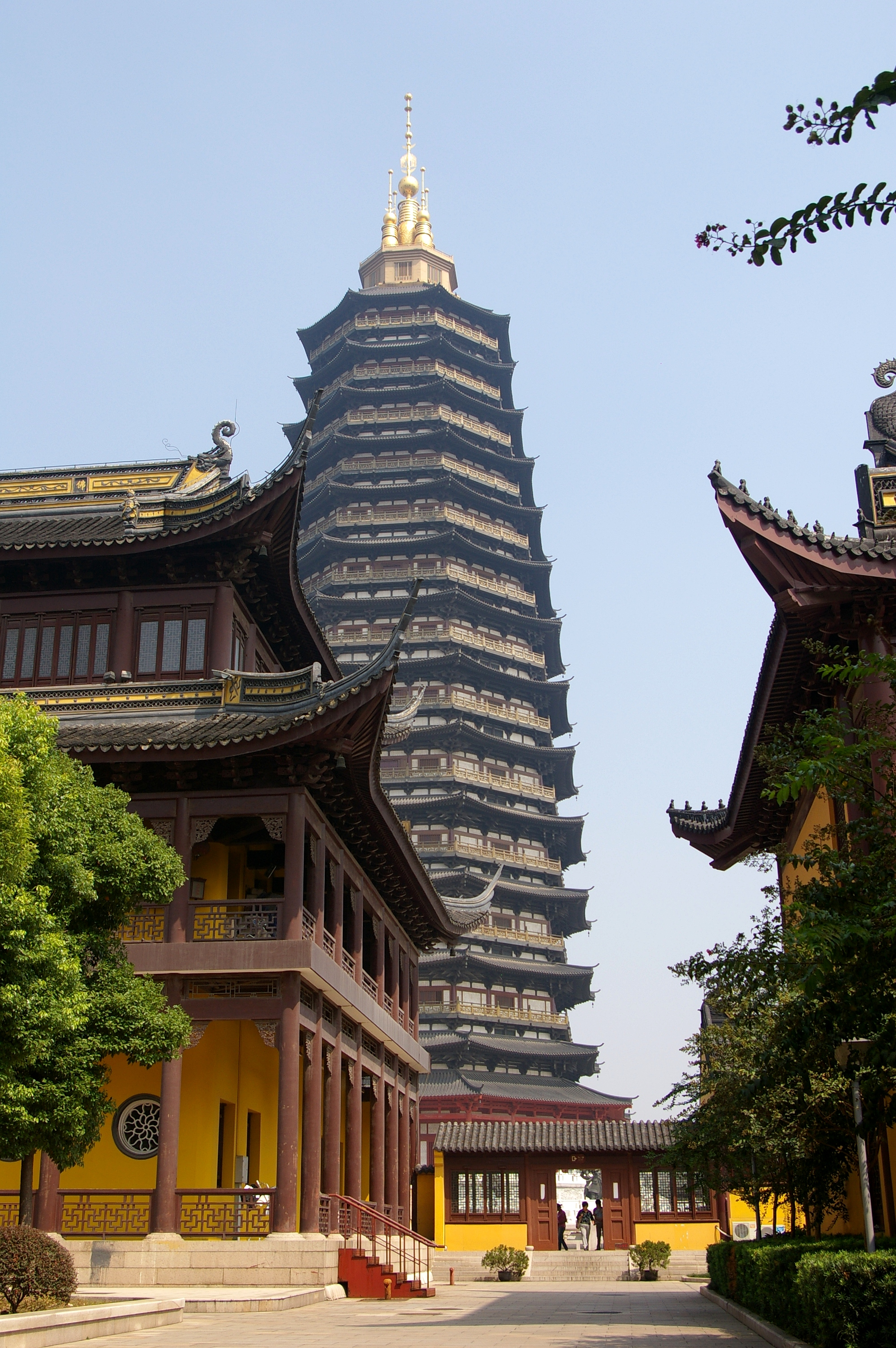
A closer view of the pagoda

The tower is supported by a 6,500 t steel structure. The grounds for the Tianning Temple Pagoda occupies a space of 27,000 m^{2} (290,625 ft^{2}). Complete with 68,038 kg (75 t) of gold and brass for the rooftops, additional bronze and jade decorations, and the use of wood imported from Myanmar and Papua New Guinea, the total cost of its construction was some 300 million yuan (US$38.5 million). The top story of the pagoda features a golden spire and a large bronze bell weighing 30,000 kg (33 t).

== Religious significance ==
On the completion of the new pagoda at Tianning Temple, the mayor of Changzhou, Wang Weicheng, explicitly correlated his city's economic development with that of religious development in China. Following the end of religious persecution after the tumultuous Cultural Revolution (1966–1976), the Chinese Communist Party has relaxed its control over religion, especially Chinese Buddhism, which has some 100 million adherents within the People's Republic of China. The deputy abbot of Tianning Temple, Kuo Hui, said that like other religions Buddhism advocates peace and harmony, with ideas that could be beneficial to Chinese society. He also stated that the pagoda was rebuilt to "inherit the fine traditions of Buddhism and to honour Buddha." The pagoda is dedicated to Chinese Chan Buddhism.

== Gallery ==
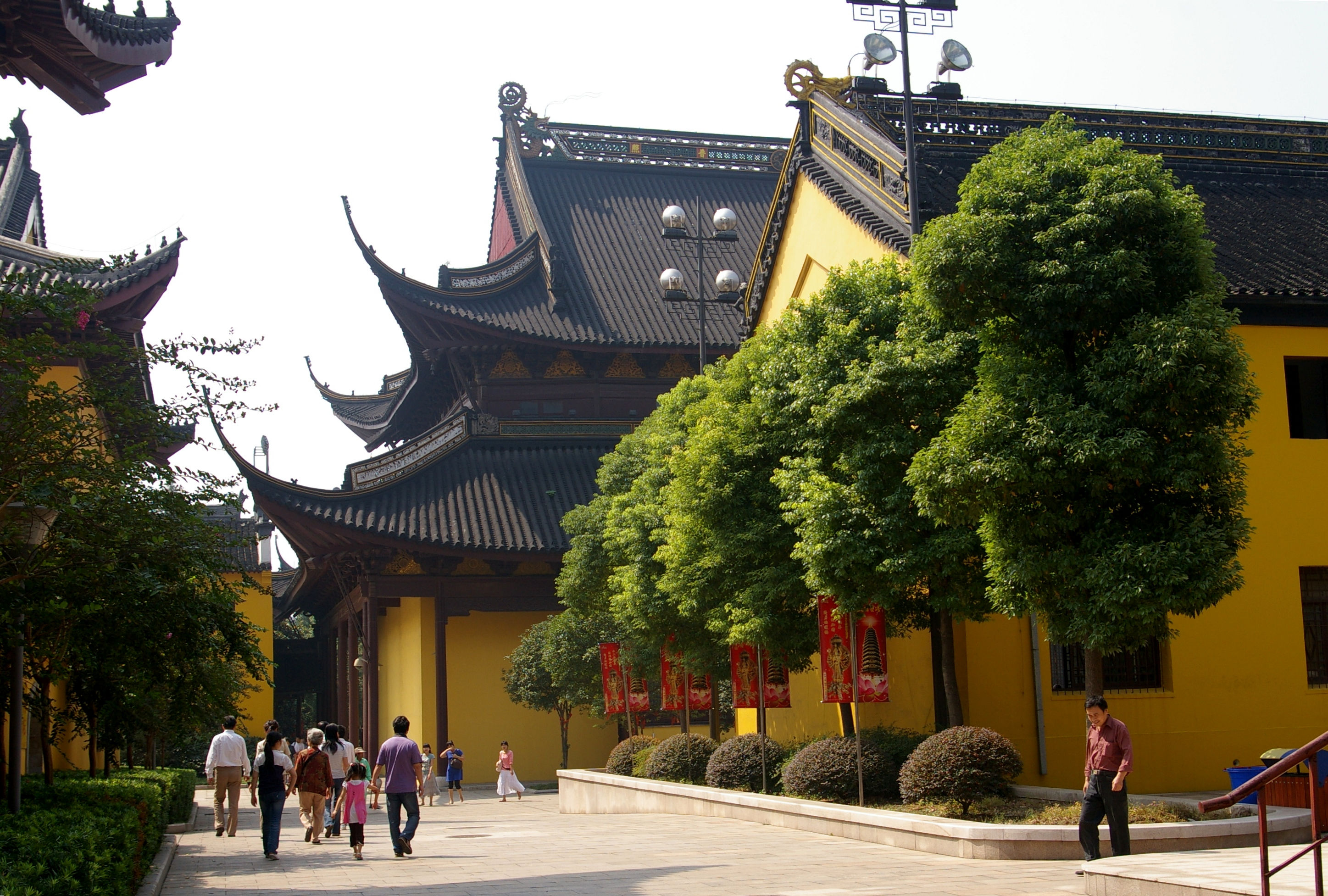

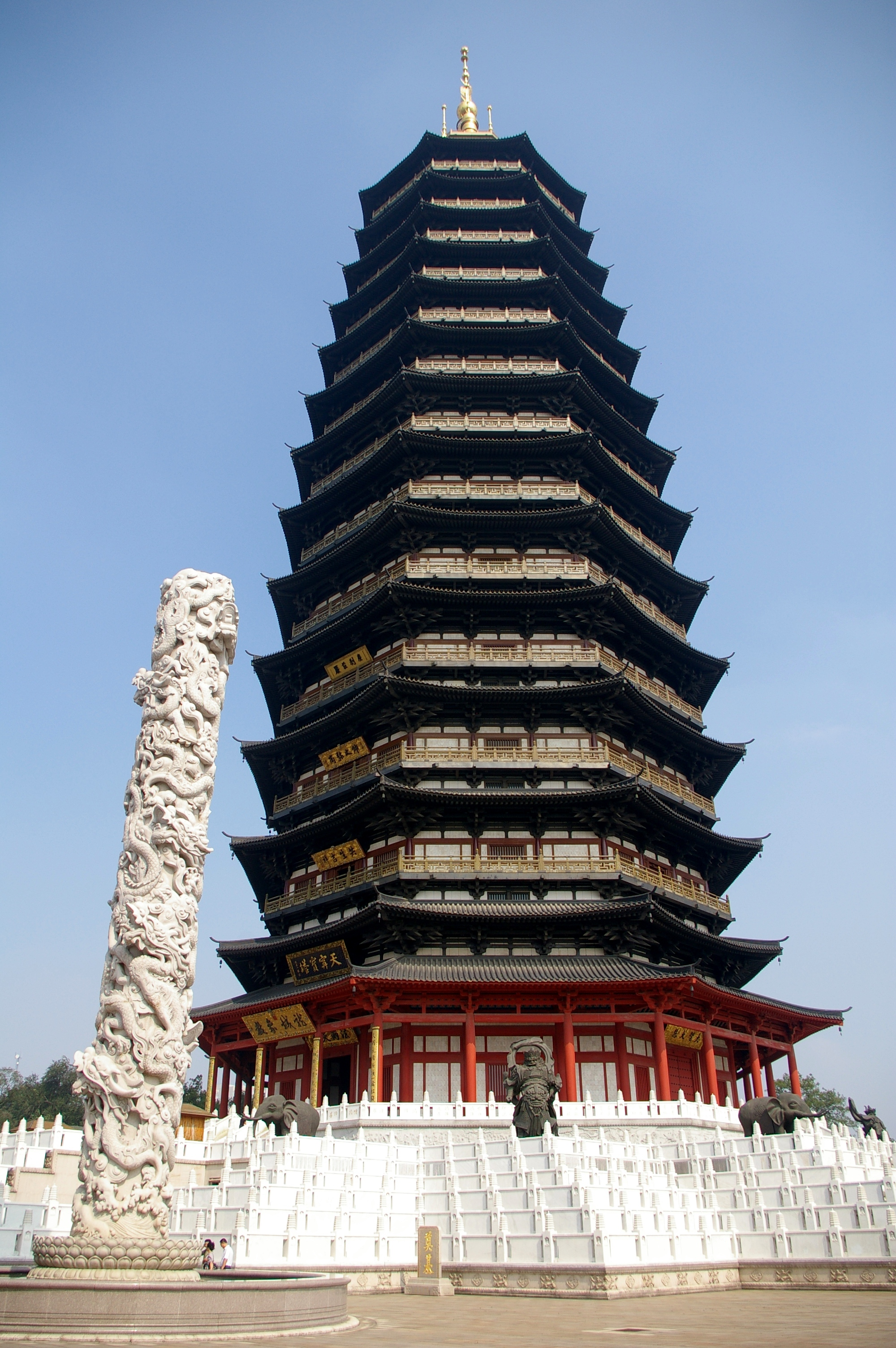

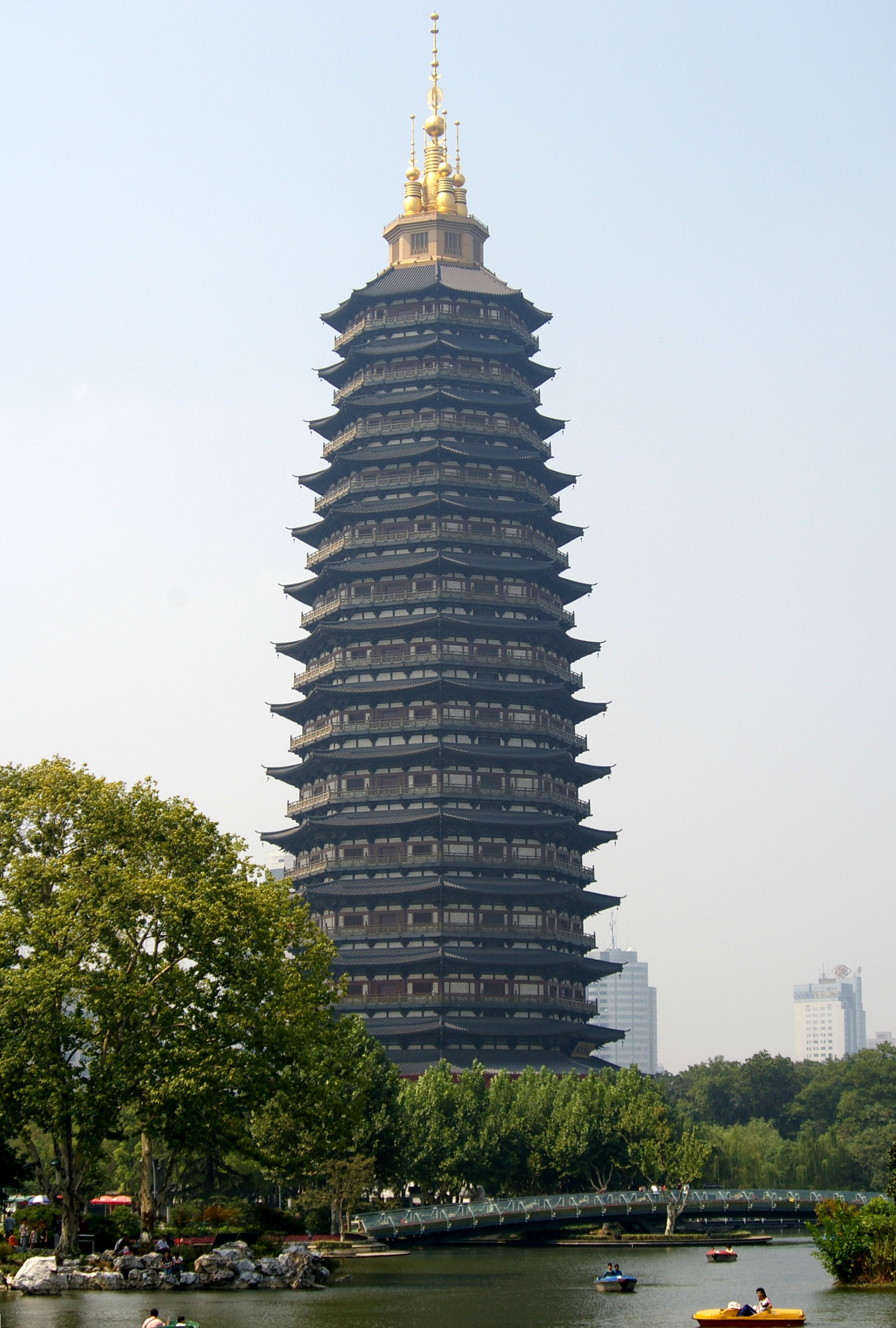

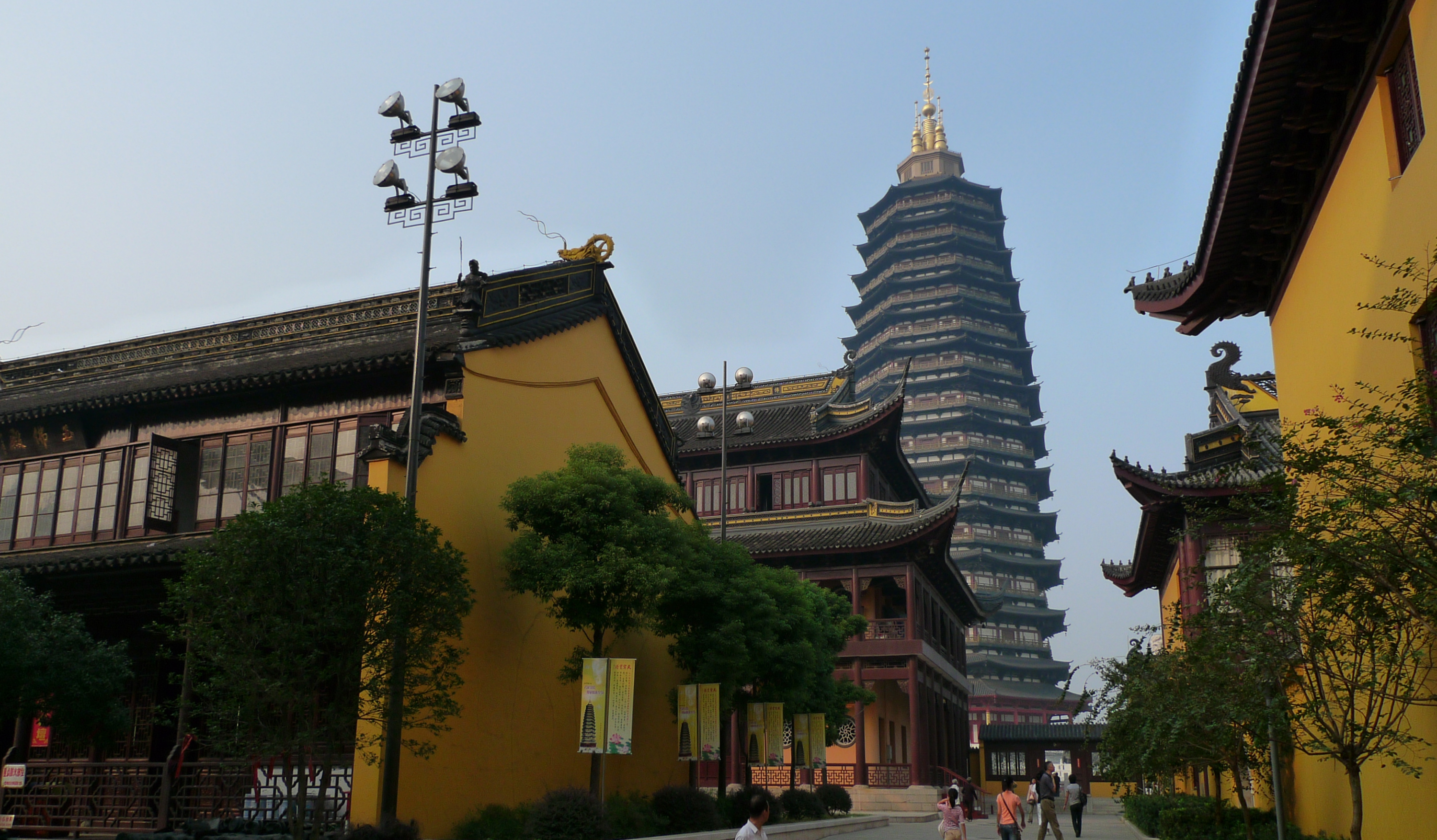

== See also ==
- Tianning Temple (Beijing)
