= Changzhou BRT =

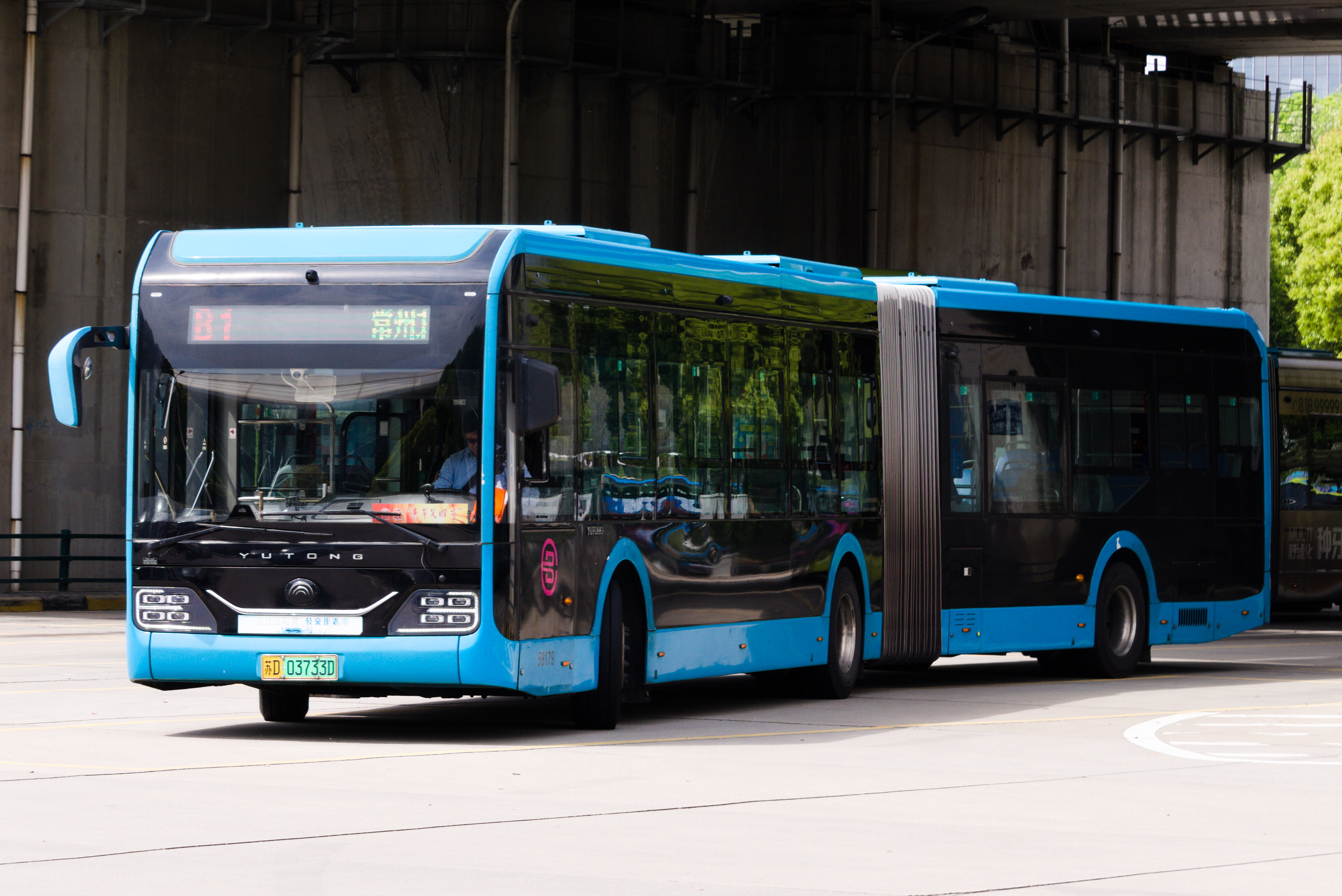
- Changzhou BRT Route B1, using an articulated bus (Yutong U18)

Overview
- Native name: 常州快速公交
- Locale: Changzhou, Jiangsu, China

Service
- Type: Bus Rapid Transit
- Operator(s): Changzhou Public Transport Group Co., Ltd. (Chinese: 常州市公共交通集团有限责任公司)

History
- Opened: 1 January 2008

Technical
- Line length: 29.5 km (18.3 mi) (B1); 18.9 km (11.7 mi) (B2)
- Num of tracks: 10 (in operation)
- Character: BRT lane, standard lane

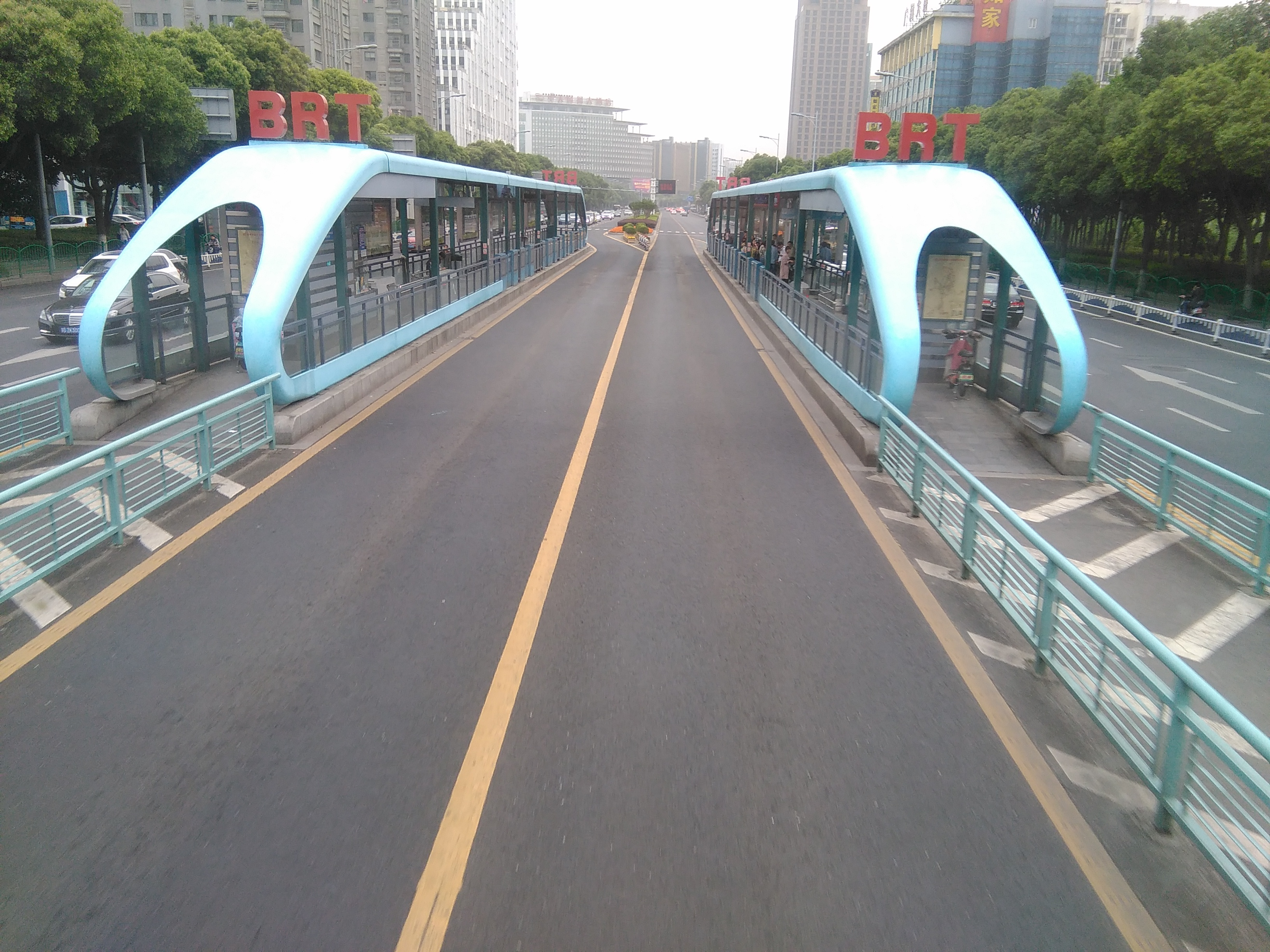
A pair of Changzhou BRT stations

Changzhou Bus Rapid Transit, also known as Changzhou BRT, is a bus rapid transit system in Changzhou, Jiangsu, China, which began operation on 1 January 2008. Currently, the BRT system consists of 2 main lines and 9 branch lines.

== Overview ==
The "Feasibility Study Report for the Changzhou BRT (Line 1) Project" (Chinese: 《常州市快速公交BRT（一号线）工程可行性研究报告》) was approved by the expert panel on 23 May 2007, and the construction of Changzhou BRT started the next day. On the first day of 2008, Changzhou BRT Line 1 started its operation. The BRT lane is set in the middle of the road, while the BRT stations are located on the both sides of the BRT lane. Passengers can enter the BRT station via zebra crossing. The bus doors open on the right.

Currently, Changzhou BRT has two main lines, B1 and B2. The length of two main lines is about 48.4 km (30.1 mi), and the branch lines is over 120 km (75 mi) in length.

== Lines ==
=== BRT Line 1 ===
Some of the current fleets of Changzhou BRT Route B1

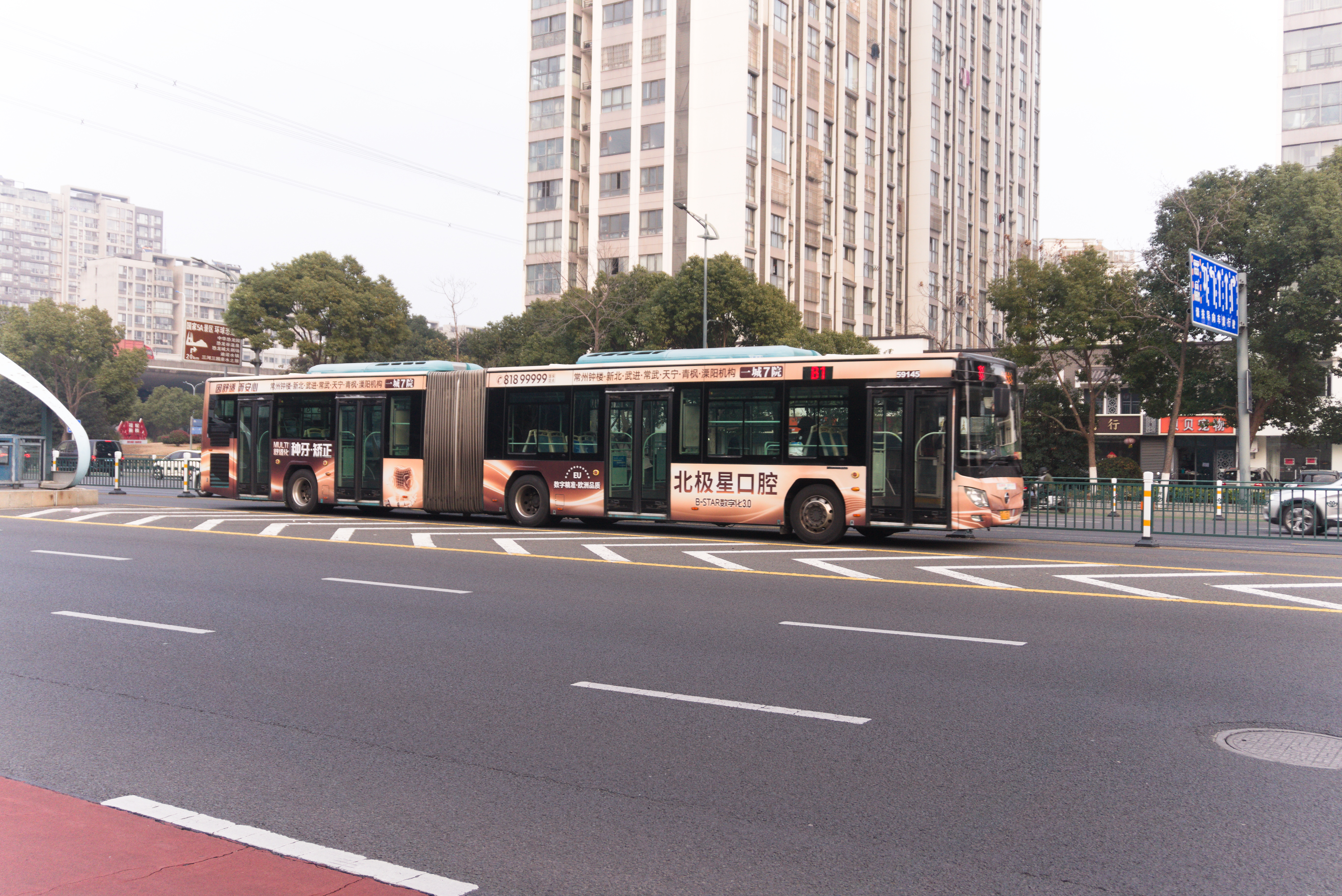
Foton articulated bus (BJ6180C8DJD)

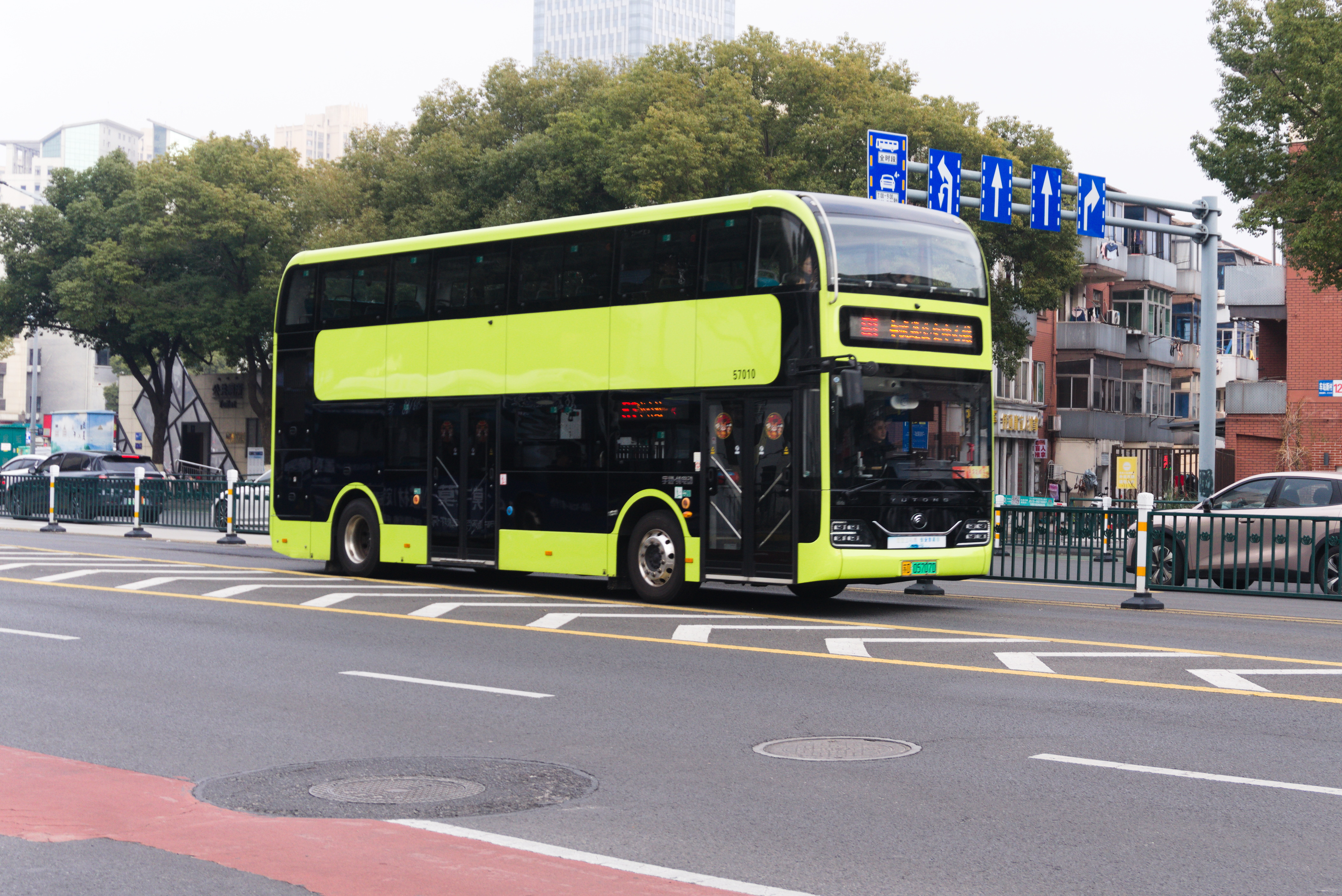
Yutong double-decker bus (E10DD)

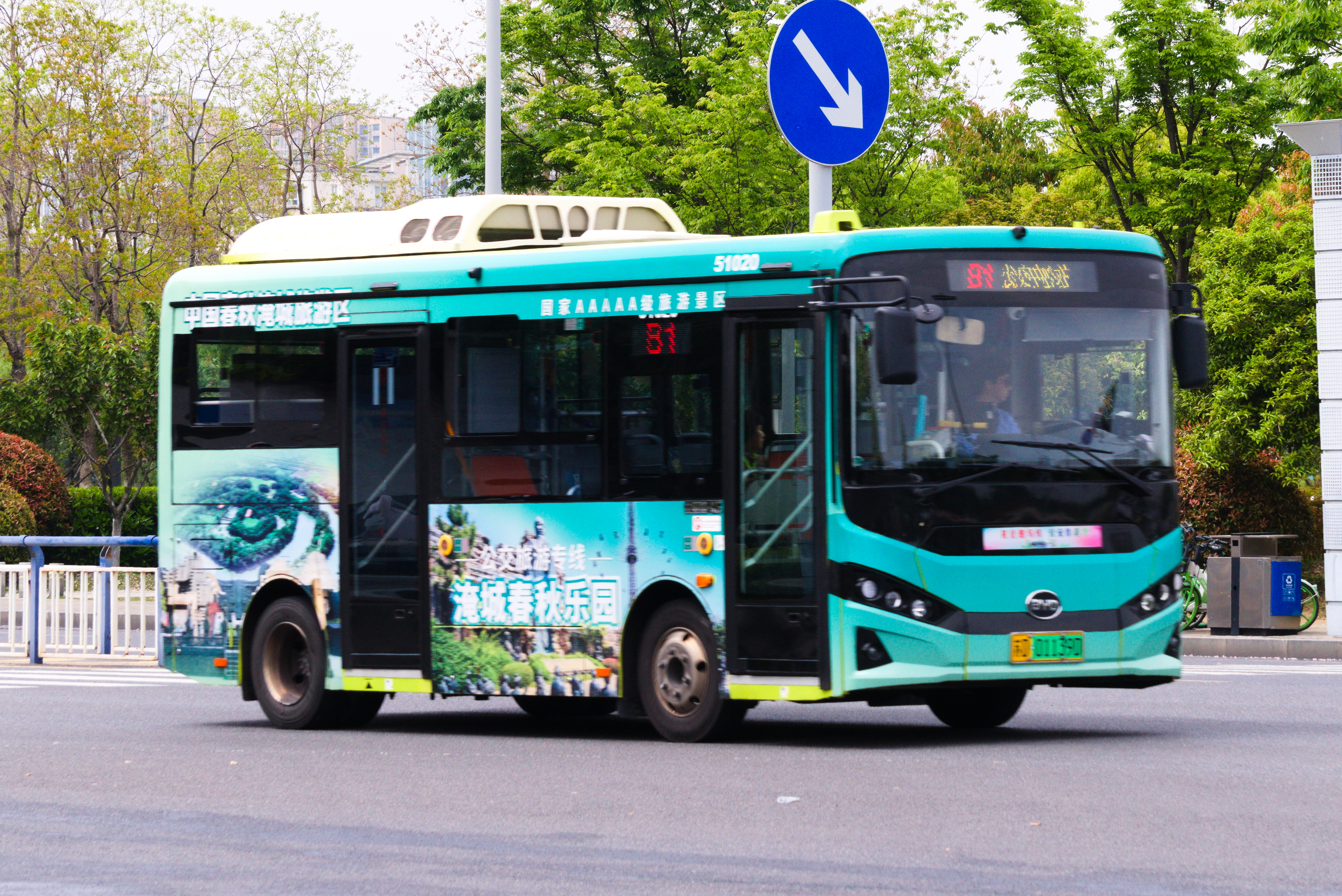
BYD ebus (K6)

Line 1 (commonly known as Route B1) is a north-south oriented route that opened on 1 January 2008. The original terminus of Route B1 was Xinbei Bus Station (Chinese: 新北公交中心站) in the north and Wujin Bus Station (Chinese: 武进公交中心站) in the south. In 2011, after the opening of Changzhou North Railway Station, the terminus in the north was extended to Changzhou North Railway Station. Route B1 passes through major roads in Changzhou like Liaohe Road, Tongjiang Road, Huaide Road, Laodong Road, and Lanling Road, and is 29.5 km (18.3 mi) in length. Route B1 is the first line in the Changzhou Bus system that uses a 18 m (59 ft) articulated bus. Besides articulated bus, current fleets of Route B1 include double-decker bus and electric-powered single-decker bus. As the main line of the Changzhou BRT system, Route B1 covers Xinbei District, Tianning District, Zhonglou District and Wujin District.

==== Line information ====
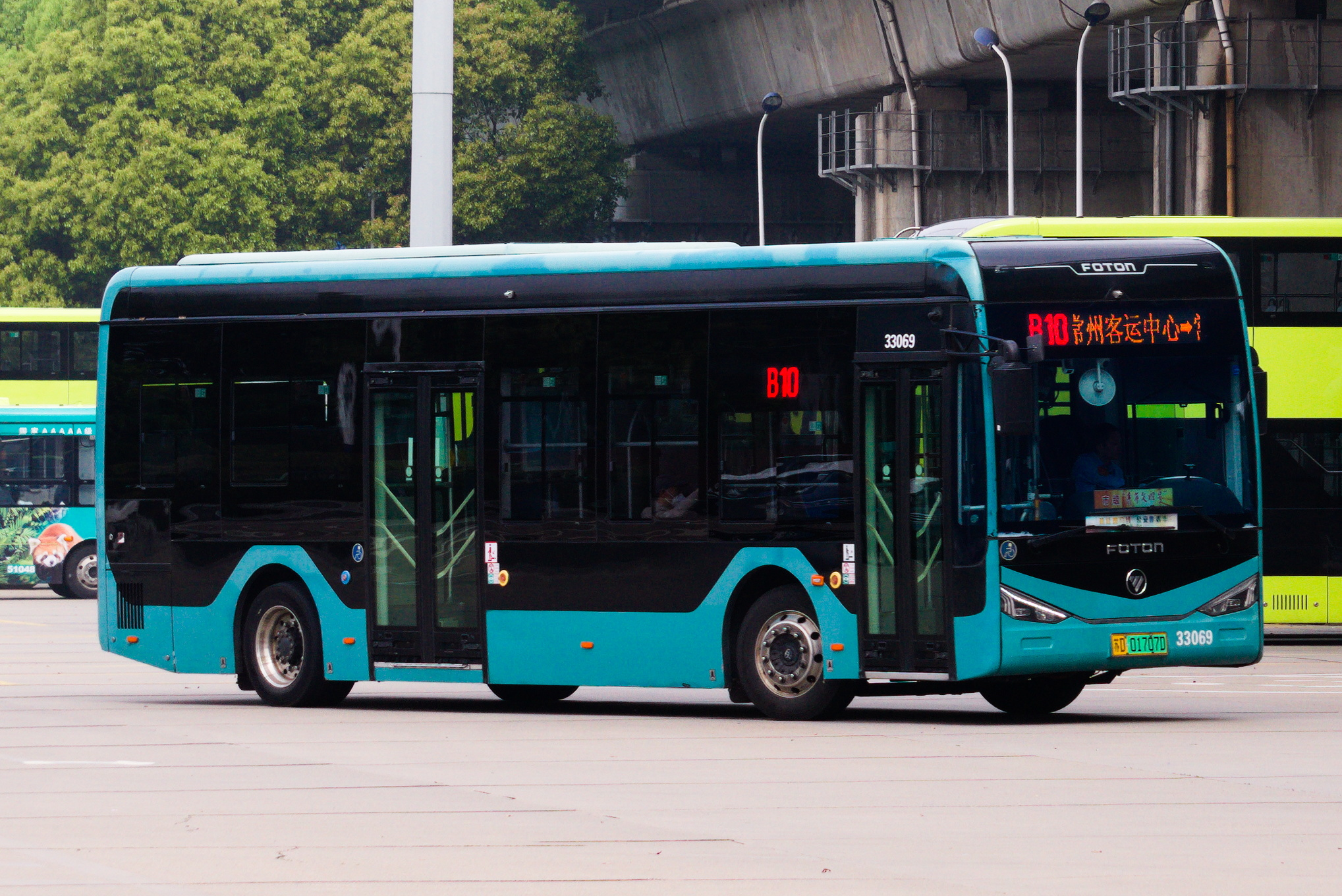
Changzhou BRT Route B10, one of the branch lines of Changzhou BRT Route B1

Currently, Line 1 has 1 main line (B1) and 6 branch lines (B10, B11, B12, B13, B15, B18). Meanwhile, some of the bus routes that doesn't belong to the Changzhou BRT system also stops at Changzhou BRT stations.

=== BRT Line 2 ===
Line 2 (commonly known as Route B2) is an east-west oriented route that opened on 1 May 2009. The original terminus of Route B2 was Xilin Bus Station (Chinese: 西林公交中心站) in the west and Qishuyan Bus Station (Chinese: 戚墅堰公交中心站) in the east. In 2013, the west terminus was extended to Xilin Bus Hub (Chinese: 西林公交枢纽), and the current east terminus is Tianing Education Town (Chinese: 天宁教育小镇). Route B2 passes through major roads in Changzhou like Huaide Road, Yanling Road, Liua Road, and Dongfang Road, and is 18.9 km (11.7 mi) in length. Due to the construction of Changzhou Metro Line 2, most BRT stations of Route B2 has been demolished, and only two of them remains.

==== Line Information ====
Currently, Line 2 has 1 main line (B2) and 2 branch lines (B22, B23). Meanwhile, some of the bus routes that doesn't belong to the Changzhou BRT system also stops at Changzhou BRT stations.

== See also ==
- Changzhou Metro
- List of bus rapid transit systems in Asia and the Pacific#China
