= Changzhou North Railway Station (metro) =

Metro station in southern Jiangsu, China

Changzhou North Railway Station 常州北站
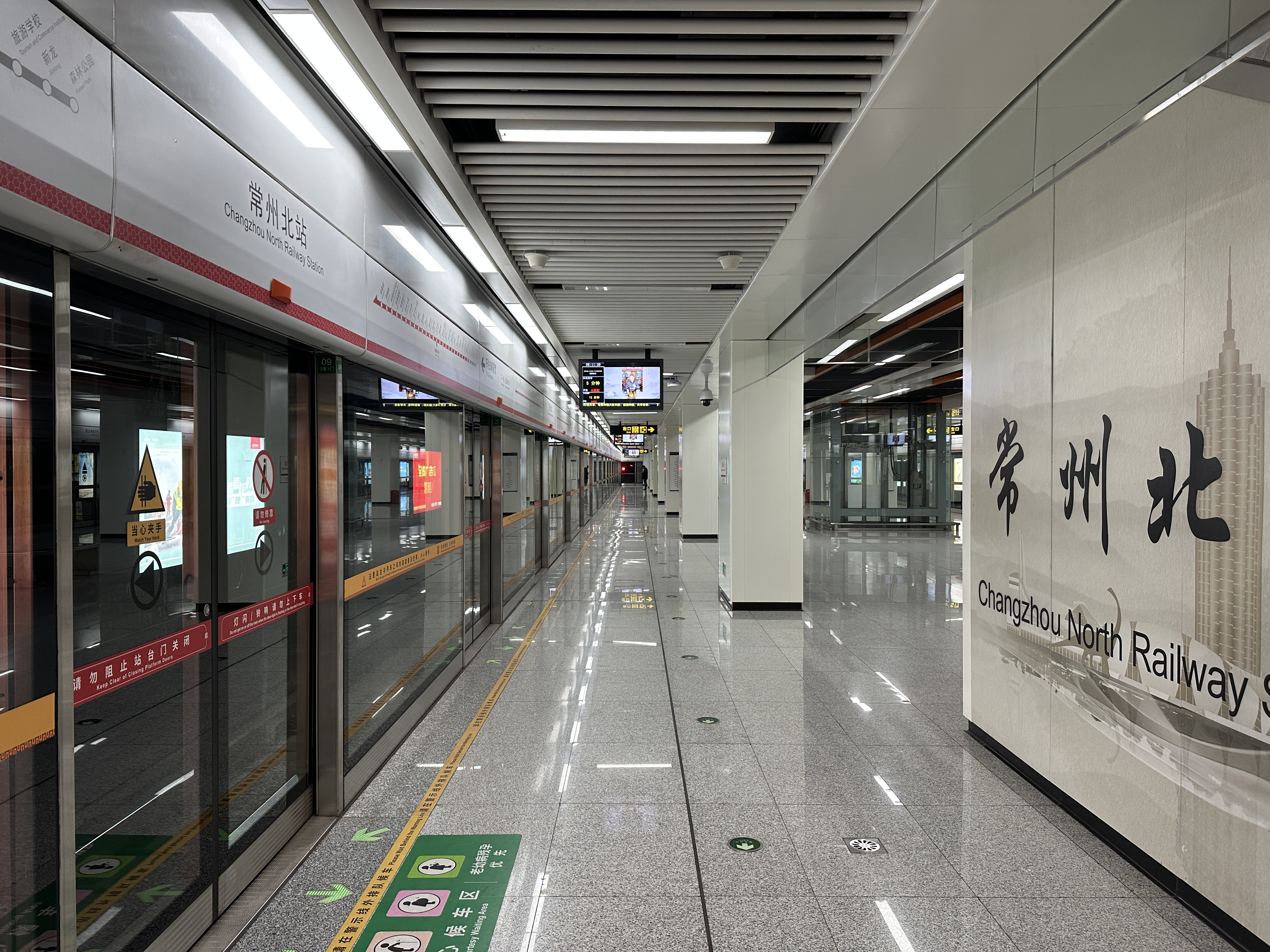

General information
- Location: Changjiang North Rd. No.8
- Coordinates: 31.8561°N 119.9507°E
- Owner: Changzhou Metro Group Co., Ltd.
- Operator: Changzhou Metro Group Co., Ltd.
- Line: Line 1 (Changzhou Metro)
- Platforms: 1 island platform
- Connections: Changzhou North Railway Station (Beijing–Shanghai high-speed railway) Changzhou BRT: B10 Changzhou Bus: 13, 26, 27, 35, 44, 44A, 59, 90, 529, T2, Airport bus

Construction
- Structure type: Underground
- Accessible: Yes

Other information
- Status: In use

History
- Opened: 21 September 2019
Location

Changzhou North Railway Station is a station on Changzhou Metro Line 1.

== Connection ==
Changzhou North Station

=== Bus ===
- Changzhou BRT: B10
- Changzhou Bus: 13, 26, 27, 35, 44, 44A, 59, 90, 529, T2, Airport bus

=== High-speed railway ===
- Changzhou North Railway Station (Beijing–Shanghai high-speed railway)
