= Changzhou Mosque =

Mosque in Changzhou, Jiangsu, China

- 常州清真寺
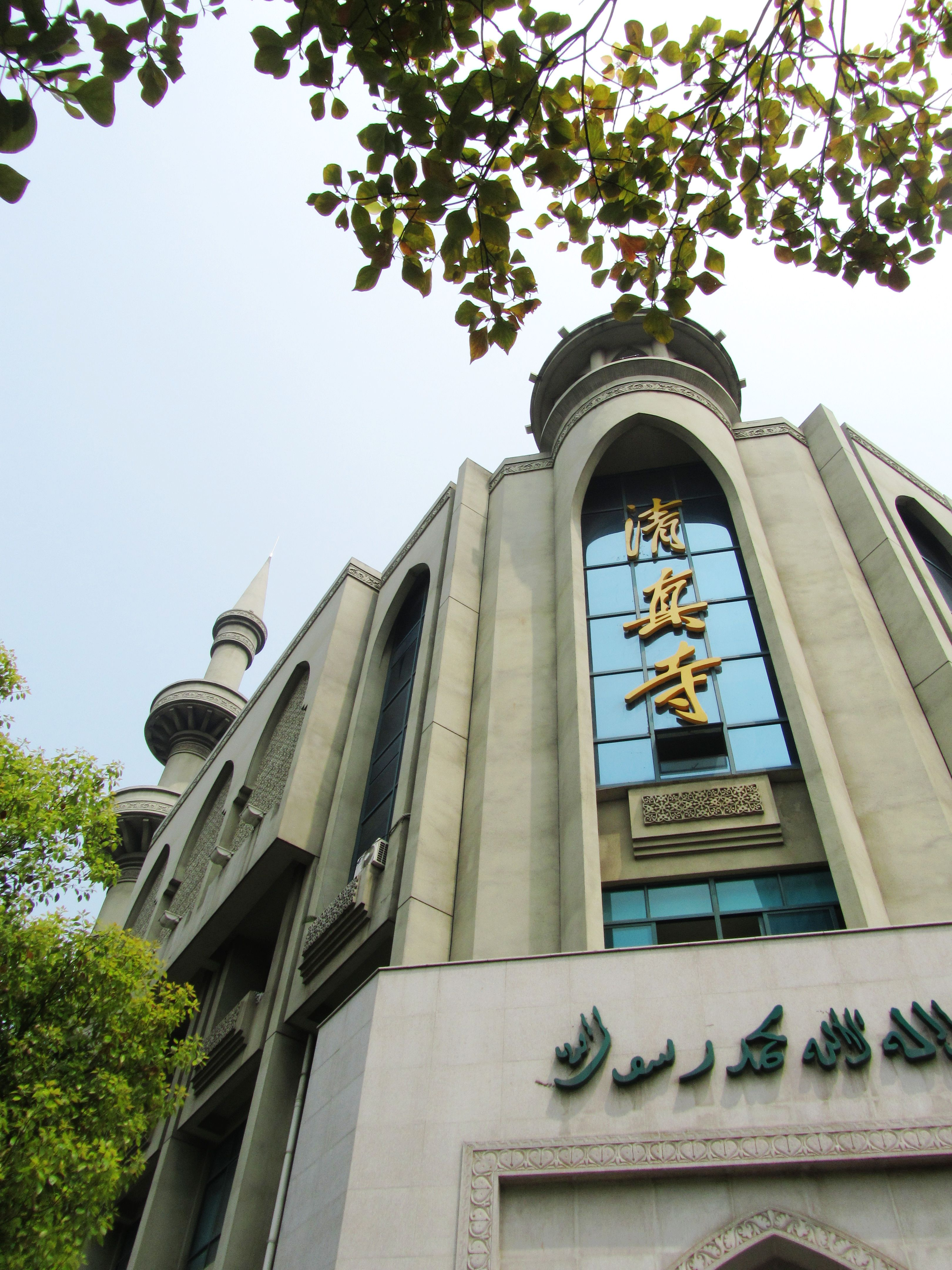

- Location of the mosques in Jiangsu

Religion
- Affiliation: Islam
- Branch/tradition: Sunni
- Ecclesiastical or organizational status: Mosque
- Status: Active

Location
- Location: Tianning, Changzhou, Jiangsu
- Country: China
- Interactive map of Changzhou Mosque
- Coordinates: 31°47′N 119°58′E

Architecture
- Type: Mosque
- Style: Islamic
- Completed: c. 1398 CE; 2006 (relocation)

Specifications
- Capacity: 800 worshipers
- Interior area: 4,800 m^{2} (52,000 sq ft)
- Dome: 1
- Dome height (outer): 36 m (118 ft)
- Minaret: 2
- Minaret height: 51 m (167 ft)
- Site area: 1,354 m^{2} (14,570 sq ft)

The Changzhou Mosque (Chinese: 常州清真寺; pinyin: Chángzhōu Qīngzhēnsì) is a mosque in Tianning District, Changzhou City, in the Jiangsu province of China.

== History ==
The mosque was completed during the Hongwu Emperor (r. 1368–1398) of the Ming dynasty. The original building was lowly shed and was repaired during the Wanli Emperor (r. 1572–1620) of the Ming dynasty and Tongzhi Emperor (r. 1861–1875) of the Qing dynasty. In 1996, it was rebuilt at its original site. Between 2003 and 2006, the mosque was relocated to the southeast corner junction of Gongyuan Road and Shuanggui Fang, due to the needs of city construction.

== Architecture ==
The mosque was completed in the Islamic architectural style and is located on a 1,354-square-metre (14,570 sq ft) site. The total floor area is 4,800 square metres (52,000 sq ft), spread over six floors, comprising a main lobby and eight floors for local part in picturesque disorder. Its arched dome is 36 metres (118 ft) high and the minarets are 51 metres (167 ft) high. The building can accommodate up to 800 worshipers.

== Transportation ==
The mosque is accessible south west of Changzhou Railway Station.

== See also ==
Changzhou Mosque
- Chinese: 常州清真寺
Transcriptions
Standard Mandarin
- Hanyu Pinyin: Chángzhōu Qīngzhēnsì

- Islam in China
- List of mosques in China
