= Line 1 (Changzhou Metro) =

Metro line in Changzhou, China

- 1
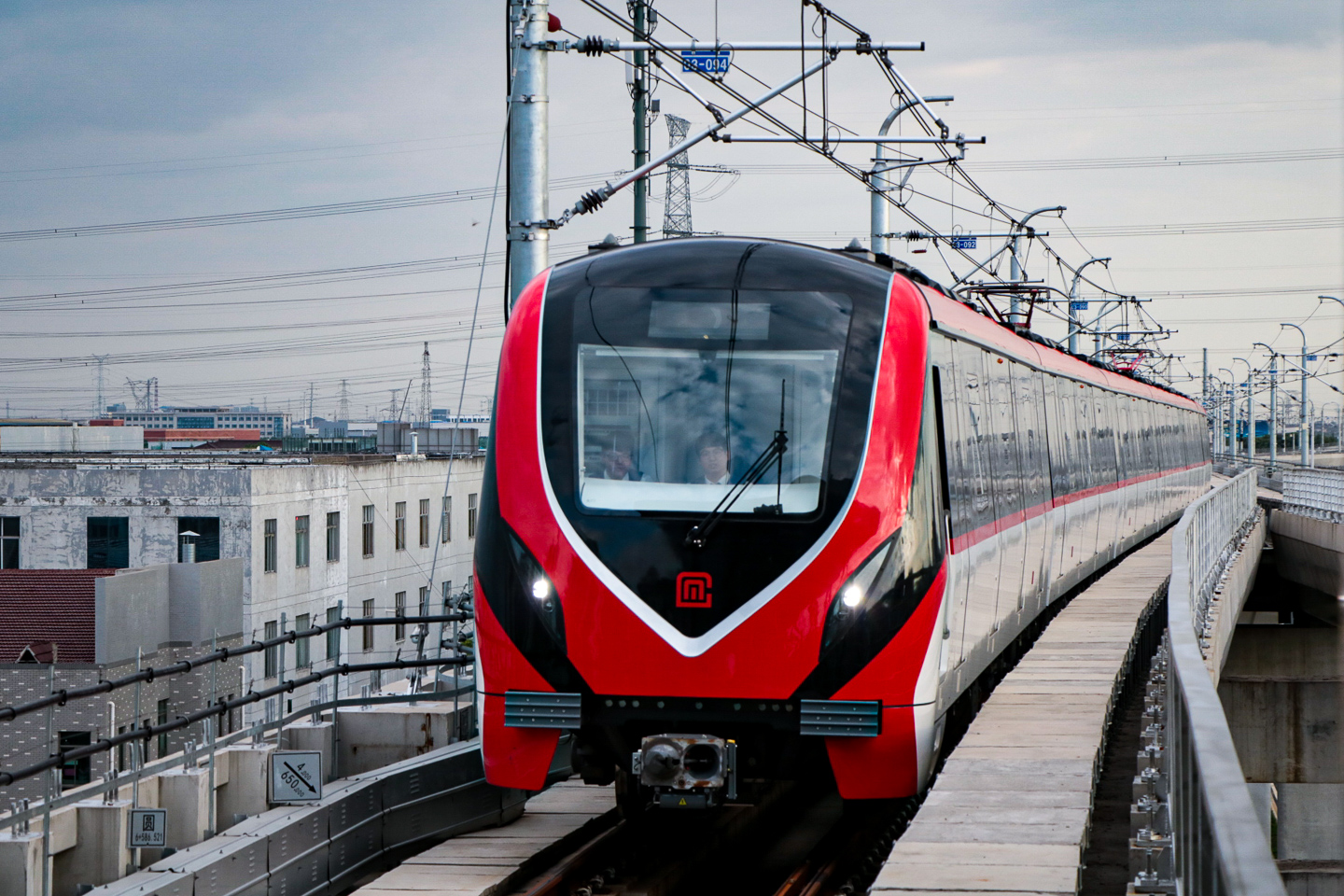
- Line 1 train

Overview
- Status: In operation
- Locale: Changzhou
- Termini: Forest Park; Nanxiashu
- Stations: 29

Service
- Type: Rapid transit
- System: Changzhou Metro

History
- Opened: 21 September 2019; 6 years ago

Technical
- Line length: 34.24 km (21.28 mi)
- Character: Underground and Elevated
- Track gauge: 1,435 mm (4 ft 8 1/2 in)
Route map

Line 1 of Changzhou Metro (Chinese: 常州地铁1号线; pinyin: Chángzhōu Dìtiě Yī Hào Xiàn) is a rapid transit line in Changzhou. It connects the two railway stations Changzhou and Changzhou North.

Construction for Line 1 began on 28 October 2014. The first phase runs from Forest Park (森林公园) in the north to Nanxiashu (南夏墅) in the south. Line 1 opened on 21 September 2019.

== Route description ==
The first phase of Line 1 starts south of Xinlong Ecological Forest in Xinbei District, runs south along Leshan Road, then turns east at Changzhou North Railway Station. It then runs east along Liaohe Road to Middle Tongjiang Road, turning to the south thereafter, passing under the Beijing-Shanghai High-Speed Railway and the Shanghai-Chengdu Expressway. It then turns south from East Huanghe Road to North Jinling Road, passing through important areas such as Hehai, Changzhou Olympic Sports Center, and Changzhou Cultural Center, before passing through East Feilong Road and Xintang Road to a station below the north square of Changzhou Railway Station. After passing under the Shanghai-Nanjing Intercity and the Beijing-Shanghai Railway, it runs south along Heping Road, where it reaches Cultural Palace Station, the interchange station with Line 2. Continuing south, it passes under the Changzhou bypass of the Beijing-Hangzhou Grand Canal, then continues south along Huayuan Street, passing under the Changzhou Science and Education Town, thereafter continuing along Fengqi Road, crossing Wujin Railway Station on the Shanghai-Nanjing Riverside High-Speed Railway. After passing under the railway and the Shanghai-Wujin Expressway, the line emerges above ground and continues south on an elevated viaduct, ending at the intersection of Fengqi Road and Longfan Road.

== Operation ==
Line 1 is designed for a speed of 80 km/h. The rolling stock consists of B-type cars with 6 cars per train. The trains are powered by DC 1500V overhead catenary. The line control center is located near Chashan station.

== Opening timeline ==
| Segment | Commencement | Length | Station(s) | Name |
|---|---|---|---|---|
| Forest Park — Nanxiashu | 21 September 2019 | 34.24 km (21.28 mi) | 29 | Phase 1 |

== Stations ==

| Station name | | Connections | Distance km | Location |
| English | Chinese | Connections | Distance km | Location |
|---|---|---|---|---|
| Forest Park | 森林公园 | | | Xinbei |
| Xinlong | 新龙 | | | Xinbei |
| Tourism and Commerce Institute | 旅游学校 | | | Xinbei |
| Xinqiao | 新桥 | | | Xinbei |
| Changzhou North Railway Station | 常州北站 | ESH; Changzhou BRT | | Xinbei |
| Beijiao High School | 北郊中学 | Changzhou BRT | | Xinbei |
| Foreign Language School | 外国语学校 | Changzhou BRT | | Xinbei |
| Global Harbor | 环球港 | Changzhou BRT | | Xinbei |
| Xinqu Park | 新区公园 | | | Xinbei |
| Hehai | 河海 | | | Xinbei |
| Olympic Sports Center | 奥体中心 | | | Xinbei |
| Citizens' Square | 市民广场 | | | Tianning / Xinbei |
| Cuizhu | 翠竹 | | | Tianning |
| Changzhou Railway Station | 常州火车站 | CZH | | Tianning |
| Boai Lu | 博爱路 | | | Tianning |
| Cultural Palace | 文化宫 | 2 Changzhou BRT | | Tianning |
| Tongjiqiao | 同济桥 | | | Tianning |
| Qingliang Temple | 清凉寺 | | | Tianning |
| Chashan | 茶山 | | | Tianning |
| Juhu Lu | 聚湖路 | | | Wujin |
| Hutang | 湖塘 | | | Wujin |
| Xintiandi Park | 新天地公园 | | | Wujin |
| Changhong Lu | 长虹路 | | | Wujin |
| Yanzheng Dadao | 延政大道 | | | Wujin |
| Kejiaocheng Bei | 科教城北 | | | Wujin |
| Kejiaocheng Nan | 科教城南 | Changzhou BRT | | Wujin |
| Wujin Yanjiang Railway Station | 武进沿江城际 | | | Wujin |
| Yanghu Lu | 阳湖路 | | | Wujin |
| Nanxiashu | 南夏墅 | | | Wujin |
