= Xinfang Bridge =

Xinfang Bridge 新坊桥
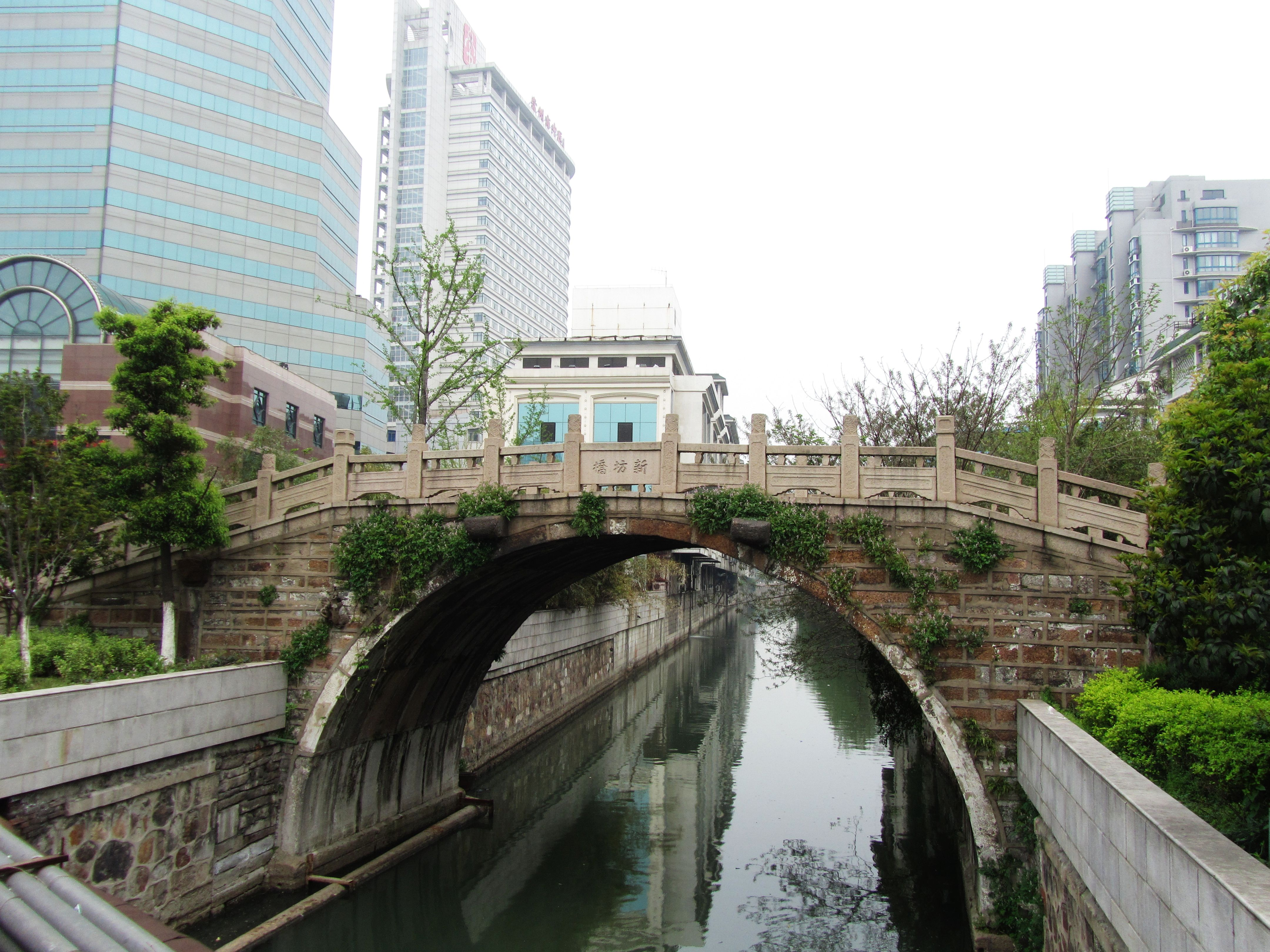
- Xinfang Bridge in April 2012
- Coordinates: 31°46′26″N 119°57′30″E
- Carries: Pedestrians and bicycles
- Crosses: Shi River
- Locale: Tianning District of Changzhou, Jiangsu, China

Characteristics
- Design: Arch bridge
- Material: Stone
- Total length: 35.2 metres (115 ft)
- Width: 5.3 metres (17 ft)
- Height: 8.6 metres (28 ft)

History
- Construction end: 535
- Rebuilt: 1986

The Xinfang Bridge (simplified Chinese: 新坊桥; traditional Chinese: 新坊橋; pinyin: Xīnfǎng Qiáo) is a historic stone arch bridge over the Shi River in Tianning District of Changzhou, Jiangsu, China. The bridge measures 35.2 metres (115 ft) long, 5.3 metres (17 ft) wide, and approximately 8.6 metres (28 ft) high.

== History ==
The original bridge dates back to 535, during the Liang dynasty (502–557), and underwent three renovations, respectively in the Huangqing period of the Yuan dynasty (1271–1368), in the 11th year of the Hongzhi period of the Ming dynasty (1368–1644), and in 1986. In December 2011, it has been authorized as a provincial-level cultural heritage site by the Government of Jiangsu.
