= Nanxiashu station =

Metro station in Changzhou, China

Nanxiashu 南夏墅
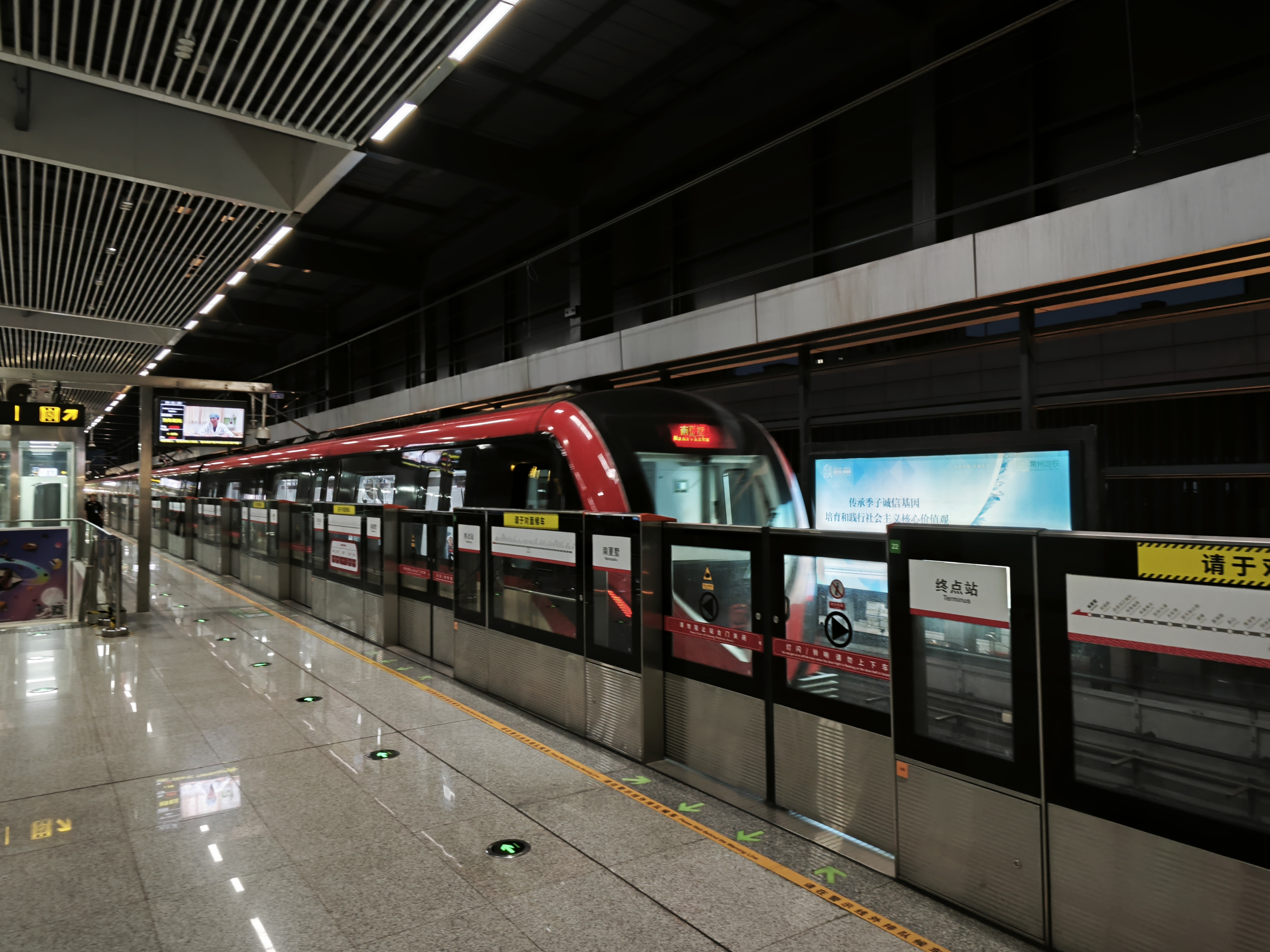

General information
- Location: Wujin District, Changzhou, Jiangsu; China
- Coordinates: 31.6342°N 119.9473°E
- Operated by: Changzhou Metro
- Line(s): Line 1

Construction
- Structure type: Elevated

History
- Opened: 21 September 2019

Services
Preceding station	Changzhou Metro	Following station
Yanghu Lu towards Forest Park	Line 1	Terminus
Location

Nanxiashu station is a station of Line 1 of the Changzhou Metro, and the southern terminus of the line. It takes about 1 hour to the northern terminus Forest Park station. It started operations on 21 September 2019. 4 exits are available.
