= Changzhou International School =

School in Changzhou, Jiangsu, China

Coordinates: 31.869200°N 119.979689°E

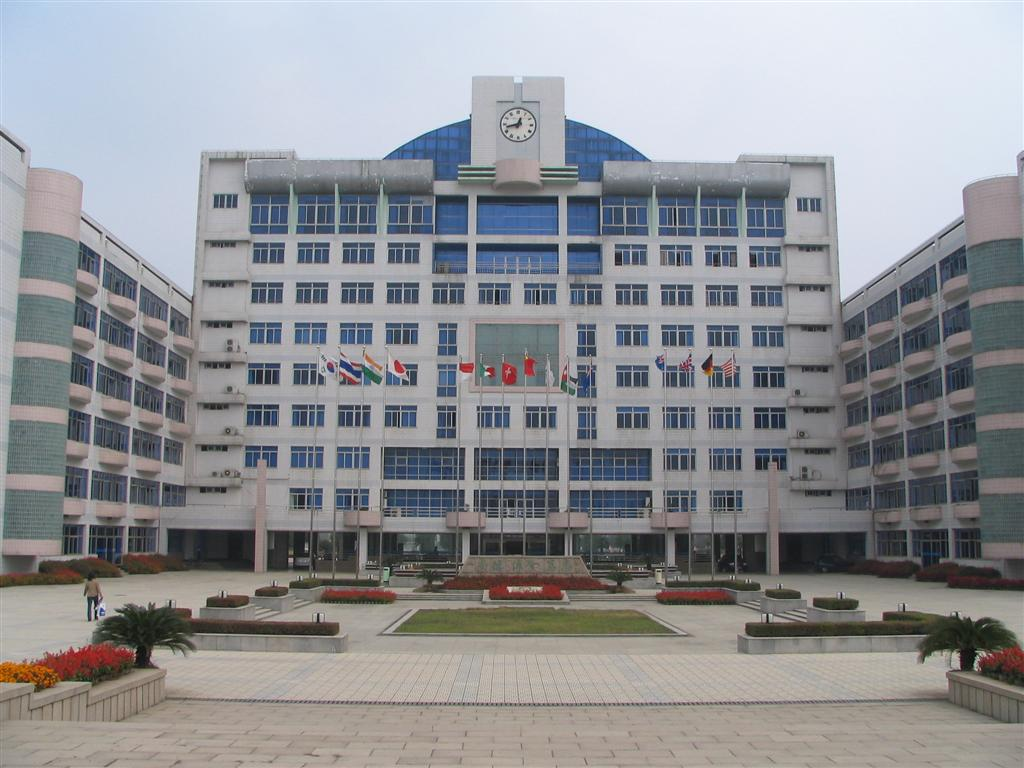
Changzhou International School

Changzhou International School was a key provincial school in the Xinbei district of Changzhou, Jiangsu, People's Republic of China. It had around 1,000 enrolled students from China and abroad.

== History ==
Changzhou International School was founded in 1997 as a pilot middle school by the Changzhou Xin Bei government and the Changzhou education bureau. The school was founded with a 190 Million RMB initial investment.

== Geography ==
The school sat on 12.6 hectares in Changzhou's Xin Bei district, approximately 10 km north of Changzhou city centre.
