= Changzhou railway station =

Railway station in Changzhou, China

Changzhou 常州
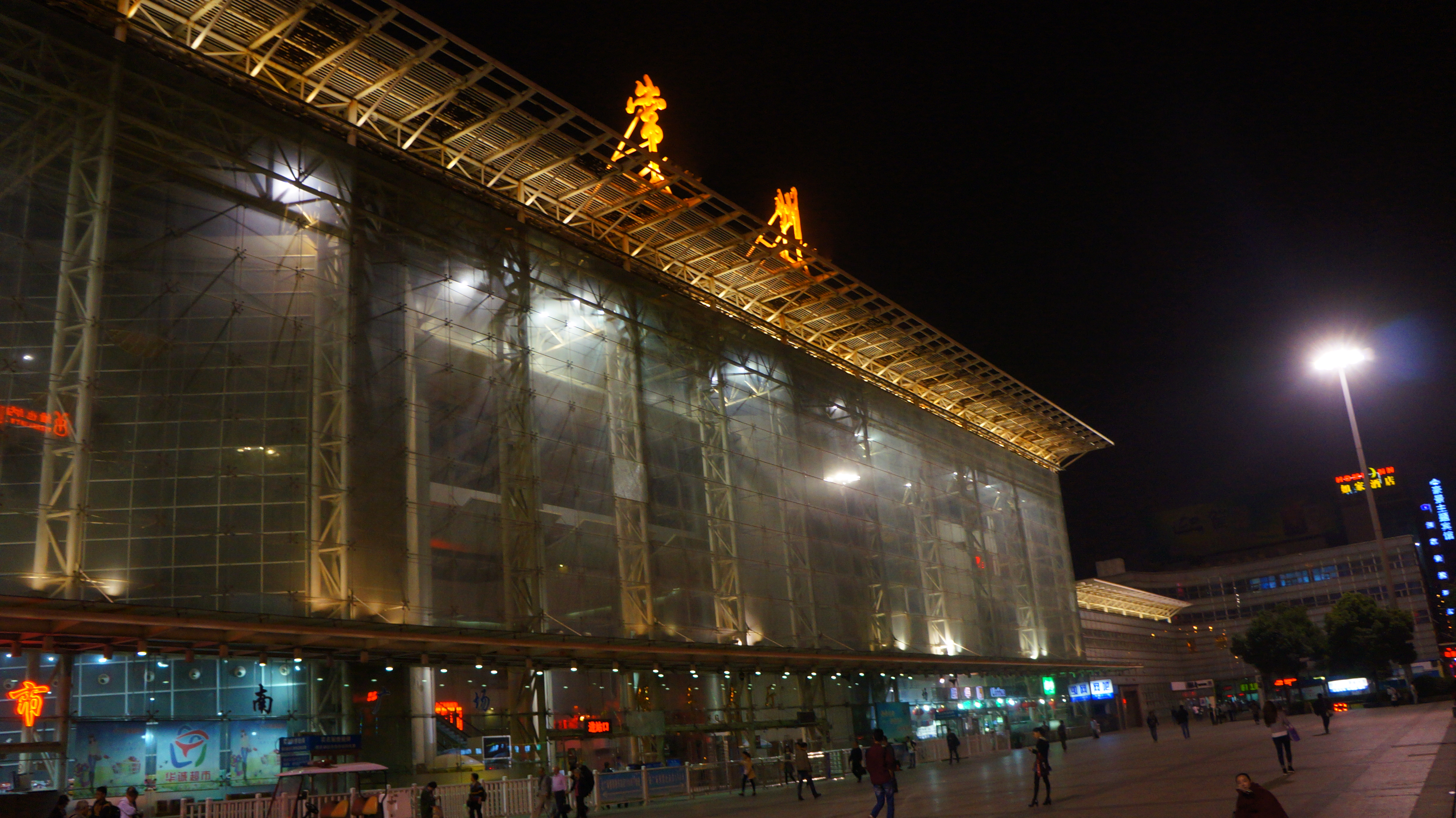
- Southern Facade of Changzhou railway station

General information
- Location: Tianning District, Changzhou, Jiangsu; China
- Coordinates: 31.78667°N 119.96694°E
- Operated by: Shanghai Railway Bureau, China Railway Corporation
- Lines: Jinghu railway, Shanghai-Nanjing Intercity Railway
- Platforms: 3
- Connections: 1

Other information
- Station code: 30452 (TMIS code); CZH (telegram code)

History
- Opened: 1908
Location

Changzhou railway station (Chinese: 常州站; pinyin: Chángzhōu zhàn) is a railway station on the Jinghu railway and Shanghai-Nanjing Intercity Railway. The station is located in Changzhou, Jiangsu, China. Roughly 350 trains stop there daily. The station is connected to Line 1 of the Changzhou Metro.

== History ==
The station opened in 1908. The northern section of the station opened in 2010 with the opening of Shanghai-Nanjing Intercity High-Speed Railway.

== Structure ==
The station is divided into two sections: the southern section and northern section. The southern section (mainly for non high-speed trains) contains six lines and three platforms and the waiting room is to the south of the yard; The northern section (for most high-speed trains) contains seven lines and three platforms and the waiting room is north of the yard.

Preceding station	China Railway High-speed	Following station
Qishuyan towards Shanghai or Shanghai Hongqiao	Shanghai–Nanjing intercity railway Part of the Huhanrong Passenger Dedicated Line	Danyang towards Nanjing
Preceding station	China Railway	Following station
Xinzhazhen towards Beijing	Beijing–Shanghai railway	Qishuyan towards Shanghai
