= Line 2 (Changzhou Metro) =

Metro line in Changzhou, China

- 2
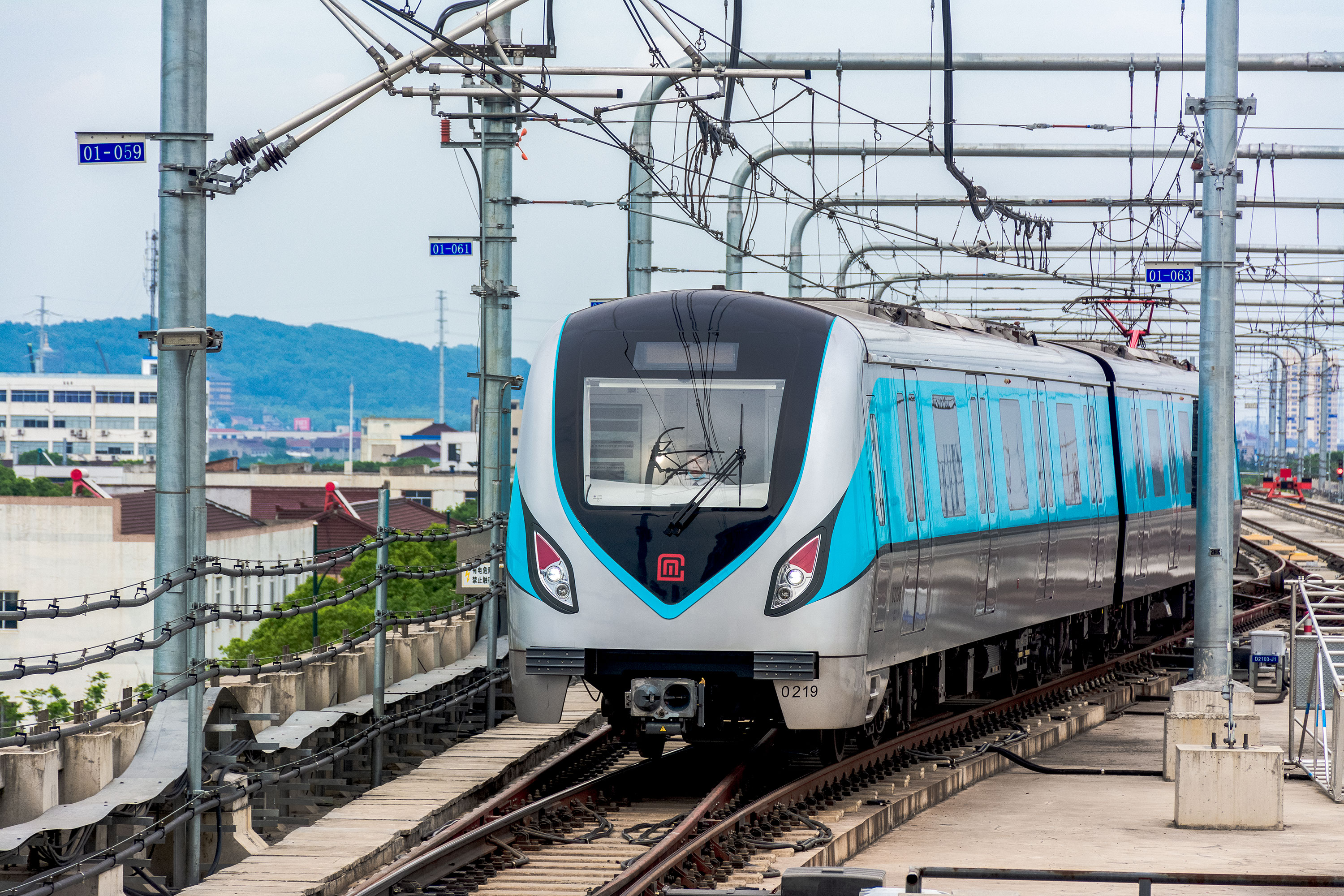
- Line 2 train

Overview
- Status: In operation
- Locale: Changzhou
- Termini: Qingfeng Park; Wuyi Lu
- Stations: 15

Service
- Type: Rapid transit
- System: Changzhou Metro

History
- Opened: 28 June 2021; 3 years ago

Technical
- Line length: 19.79 km (12.30 mi)
- Character: Underground and Elevated
- Track gauge: 1,435 mm (4 ft 8 1/2 in)
Route map

Line 2 of Changzhou Metro (Chinese: 常州地铁2号线) is a rapid transit line in Changzhou.

Construction for Line 2 began on 13 February 2017. The first phase runs from Qingfeng Park (青枫公园站) in the west to Wuyi Lu (五一路站) in the east. Line 2 opened on 28 June 2021.

== Route ==
It follows Xinggang Road from Qingfeng Park to Wuxing. It then continues under Qinye Road until Qinye, then turns onto Laodong West Road, approaching Huaide. At Nandajie, the line veers under Yanling West Road, interchanging with Line 1 at Cultural Palace, turning onto Feilong East Road at Hongmei Park. At Sanjiaochang, it again turns onto Dongfang Avenue, where it continues until Wuyi Lu.

It is in Zhonglou District from Qingfeng Park to Nandajie. It is in Tianning District from Cultural Palace to Ziyun. It is in Wujin District from Qingyang Road to Wuyi Lu.

== Opening timeline ==
Segment	Commencement	Length	Station(s)	Name
Qingfeng Park — Wuyi Lu	28 June 2021	19.79 km (12.30 mi)	15	Phase 1

== Stations ==

Station name		Connections	Distance km	Location
English	Chinese	Connections	Distance km	Location
Qingfeng Park	青枫公园			Zhonglou
Haitang Lu	海棠路			Zhonglou
Wuxing	五星			Zhonglou
Qinye	勤业			Zhonglou
Huaide	怀德			Zhonglou
Nandajie	南大街			Zhonglou
Cultural Palace	文化宫	1		Tianning
Hongmei Park	红梅公园			Tianning
Wujiaochang	五角场			Tianning
Sanjiaochang	三角场			Tianning
Ziyun	紫云			Tianning
Qingyang Lu	青洋路			Wujin
Dingyan	丁堰			Wujin
Lucheng	潞城			Wujin
Wuyi Lu	五一路			Wujin
