= Chongfa Temple =

Buddhist temple in Changzhou, Jiangsu, China

- 崇法寺
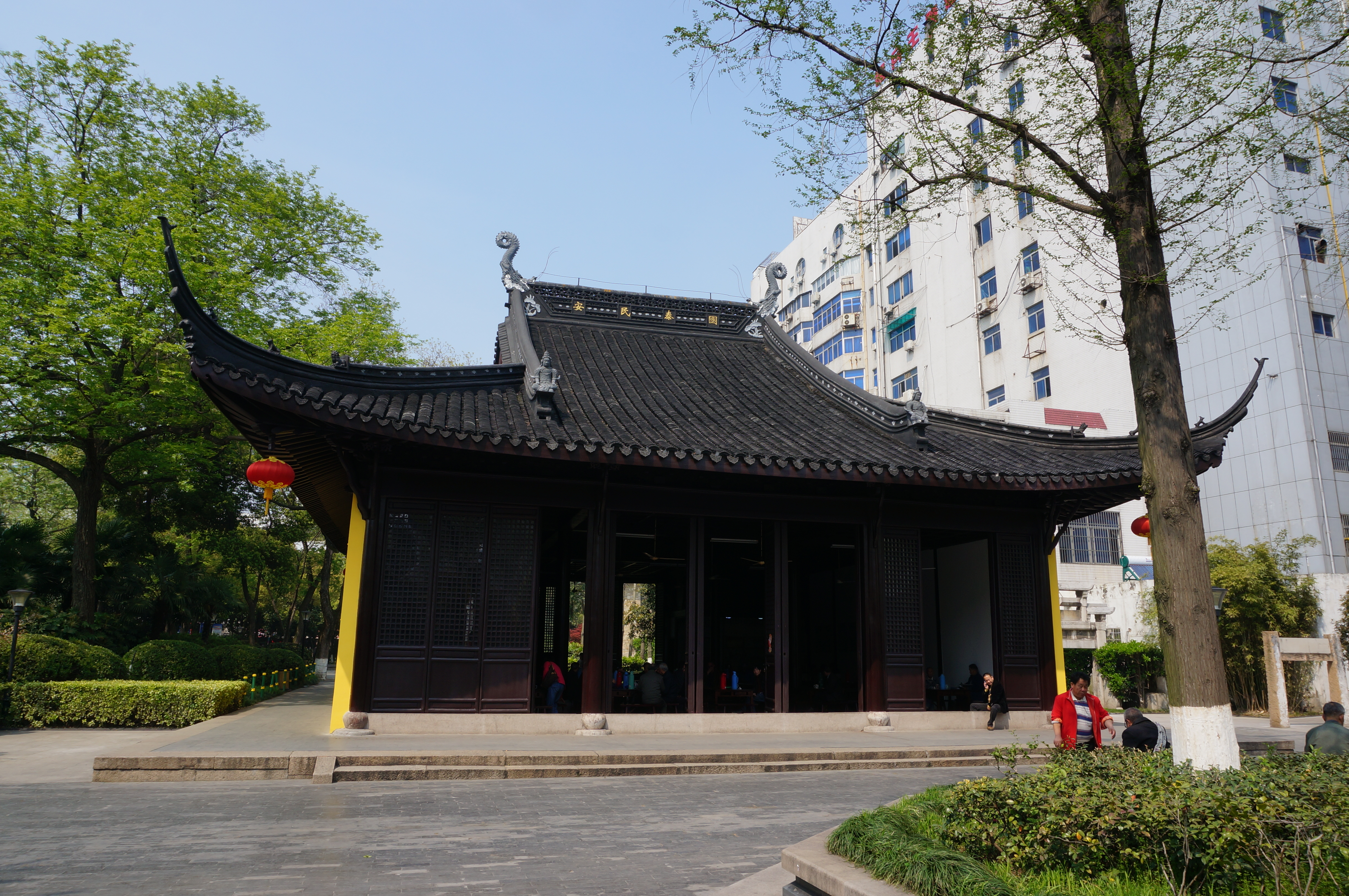
- The Mahavira Hall of Chongfa Temple.

- Location within Jiangsu

Religion
- Affiliation: Buddhism
- Sect: Chan Buddhism

Location
- Location: Renmin Park, Tianning District, Changzhou, Jiangsu
- Country: China
- Interactive map of Chongfa Temple
- Coordinates: 31°46′56″N 119°57′51″E

Architecture
- Style: Chinese architecture
- Founder: Chen Gaoren
- Established: Sui dynasty (581–619)
- Completed: Guangxu period (1875–1908; reconstruction)

Chongfa Temple (Chinese: 崇法寺; pinyin: Chongfa Sì) is a former Buddhist temple located within the Renmin Park, in Tianning District of Changzhou, Jiangsu, China.

== History ==
The temple traces its origins to a vegetable garden, founded by Chen Gaoren (陈杲仁) in the Sui dynasty (581–619) and would later become a Buddhist temple. In the Baoda period (943–957) of the Southern Tang dynasty (937–976), it was known as "Dasheng Temple" (大圣院; 'Temple of Great Sage'). It was renamed "Sengqie Temple" (僧伽院; 'Temple of Monks') at the dawn of Northern Song dynasty. In 1125, Huizong Emperor honored the name "Chongfa Chan Temple" (崇法禅寺). In the reign of Hongwu Emperor (1368–1398) of the Ming dynasty (1368–1644), its name was changed to "Chongfa Buddhist Temple" (崇法教寺). Because the southeast corner of the temple had a bell tower, it was also more commonly known as "Bell Tower Temple". The temple was devastated by the Taiping Rebellion during the ruling of Xianfeng Emperor (1850–1861) in late Qing dynasty (1644–1911), and was restored and rebuilt in Guangxu period (1875–1908).

After the establishment of the Communist State, the wing-room was demolished, only the Mahavira Hall survived. In December 1987, it was designated as a "Municipality Protected Historic Site" by Changzhou government.

== Architecture ==
The Mahavira Hall is three rooms wide with single-eave gable and hip roof. A stone inscription named "On the Reconstruction of Bell Tower in Chongfa Temple" (崇法寺重建钟楼碑记) which was made in 1827 are embedded in the west wall. Now it is used as a teahouse.
