= Da Niang Dumpling =

Chinese fast food restaurant chain

Da Niang Dumplings Holdings Limited
- Simplified Chinese: 大娘水饺餐饮集团股份有限公司
- Traditional Chinese: 大娘水餃餐飲集團股份有限公司
Transcriptions
Standard Mandarin
- Hanyu Pinyin: Dàniáng Shuǐjiǎo Cānyǐn Jítuán Gǔfènyǒuxiàngōngsī

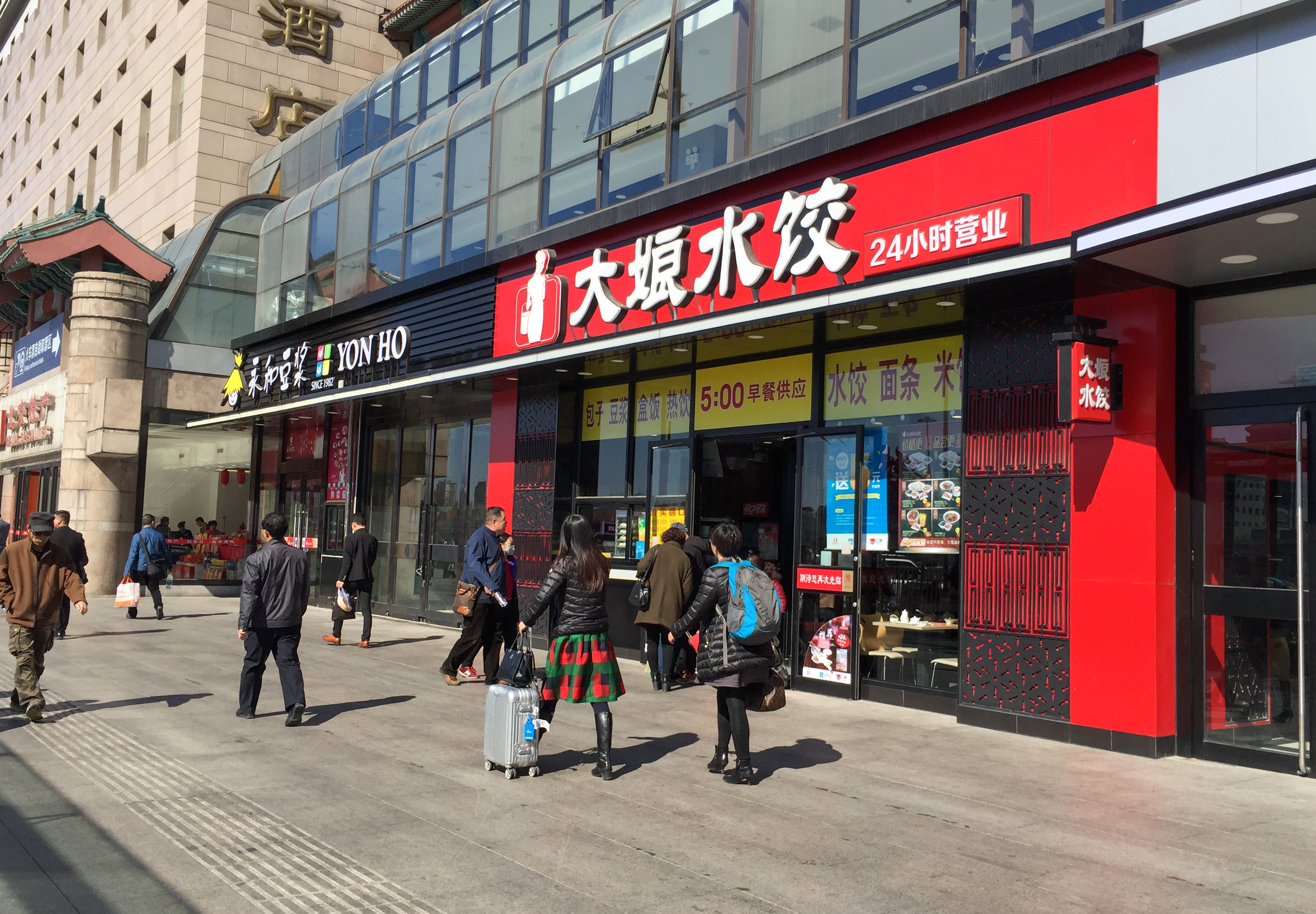
Da Niang restaurant at Beijing West railway station

Da Niang Dumplings Holdings Limited or Jiangsu DaNiang Dumpling Co., Ltd, doing business as Da Niang Dumpling (DND; simplified Chinese: 大娘水饺; traditional Chinese: 大娘水餃; pinyin: Dàniáng Shuǐjiǎo), is a Chinese fast food restaurant chain headquartered in Tianning District, Changzhou, Jiangsu. It is the largest dumpling store chain in Mainland China. The logo states "Wu Da Niang" simplified Chinese: 吴大娘; traditional Chinese: 吳大娘; pinyin: Wú Dàniáng).

== History ==
The company was founded in April 1996.

In 2012 there were 424 restaurants. By 2013 the number grew to 514. At the end of 2013 the company had a total of over 440 locations in 90 Mainland Chinese cities. In 2013 the company had over 1.5 billion renminbi (US$244 million) in sales.

CVC Capital Partners bought the company from its founder in December 2013. In 2014 the company was ranked No. 9 in China Daily's " Top 10 fast-food chains in China".
