= Zhongxin Bridge =

Zhongxin Bridge 中新桥
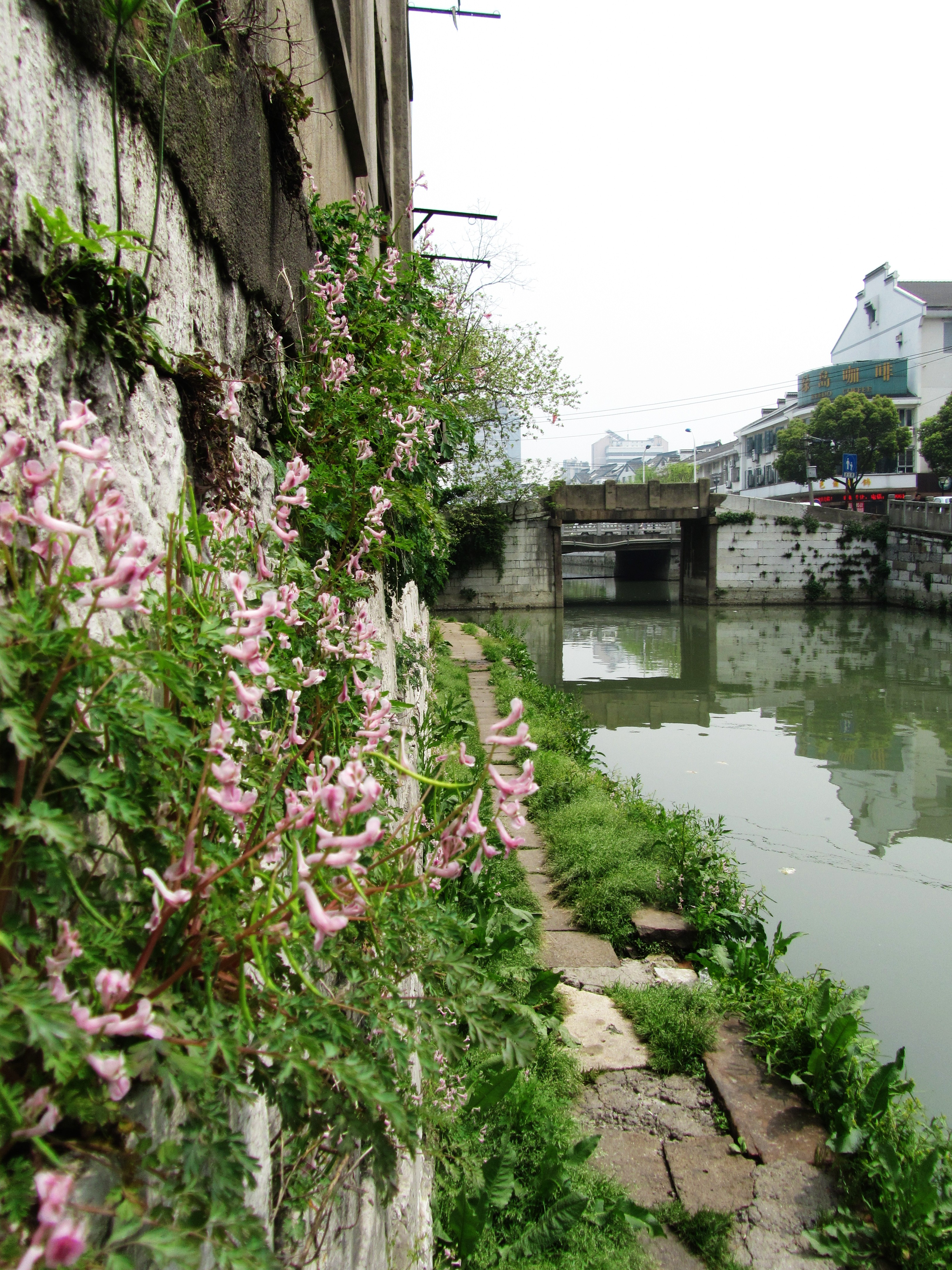
- Zhongxin Bridge in April 2012
- Coordinates: 31°46′40″N 119°57′48″E
- Carries: Pedestrians
- Crosses: South Market River
- Locale: Tianning District of Changzhou, Jiangsu, China

Characteristics
- Design: Arch bridge
- Material: Stone
- Total length: 22 metres (72 ft)
- Width: 3.8 metres (12 ft)

History
- Construction end: 1918

The Zhongxin Bridge (simplified Chinese: 中新桥; traditional Chinese: 中新橋; pinyin: Zhōngxīn Qiáo) is a historic stone arch bridge over the South Market River in Tianning District of Changzhou, Jiangsu, China. The bridge is 22 metres (72 ft) long and 3.8 metres (12 ft) wide.

== History ==
Zhongxin Bridge was built in 1918, at the dawn of the Republic of China. On 26 February 2008, it was classified as a municipal cultural relic preservation organ by the Government of Changzhou.

== Gallery ==
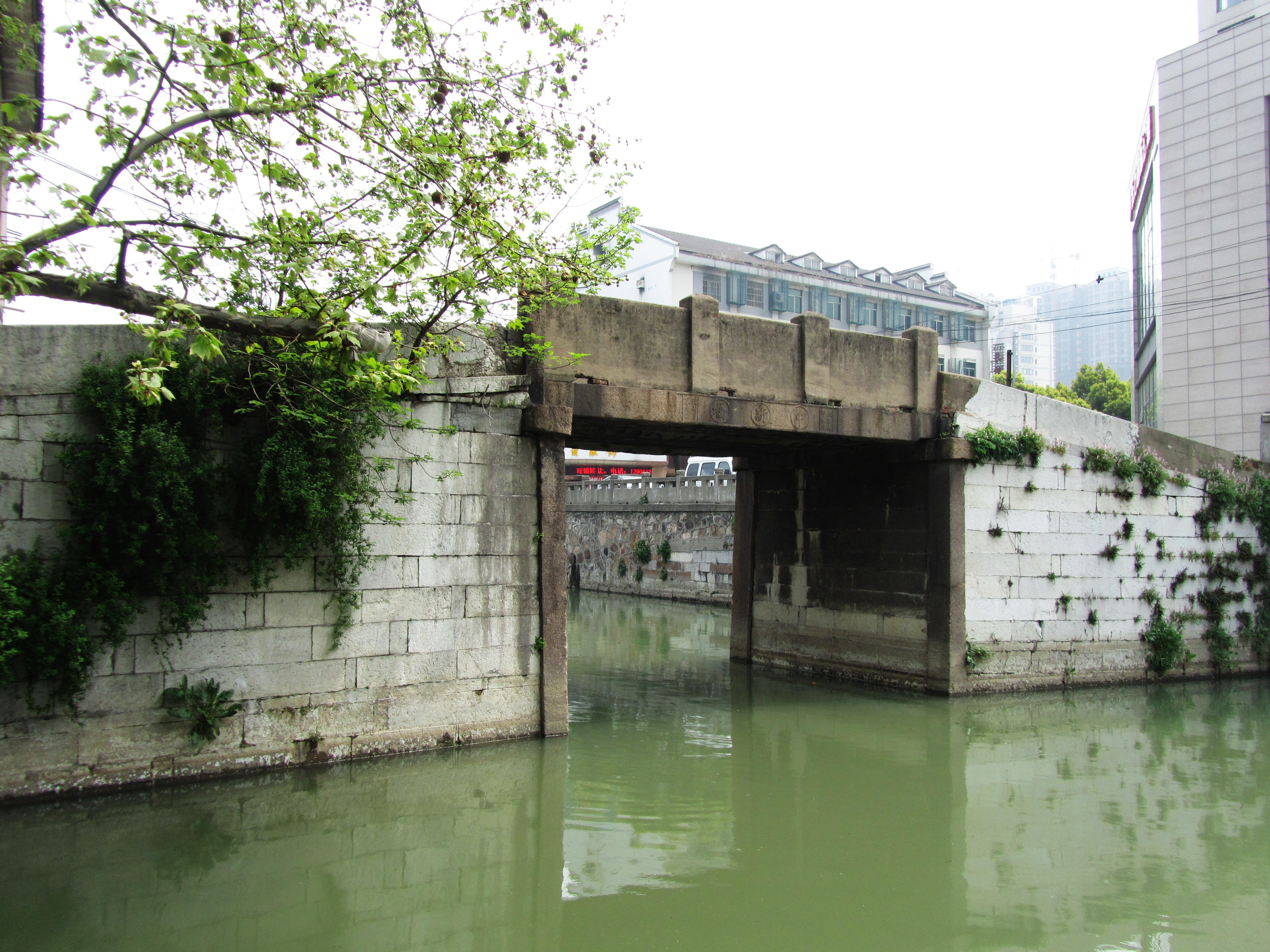
Zhongxin Bridge in April 2012

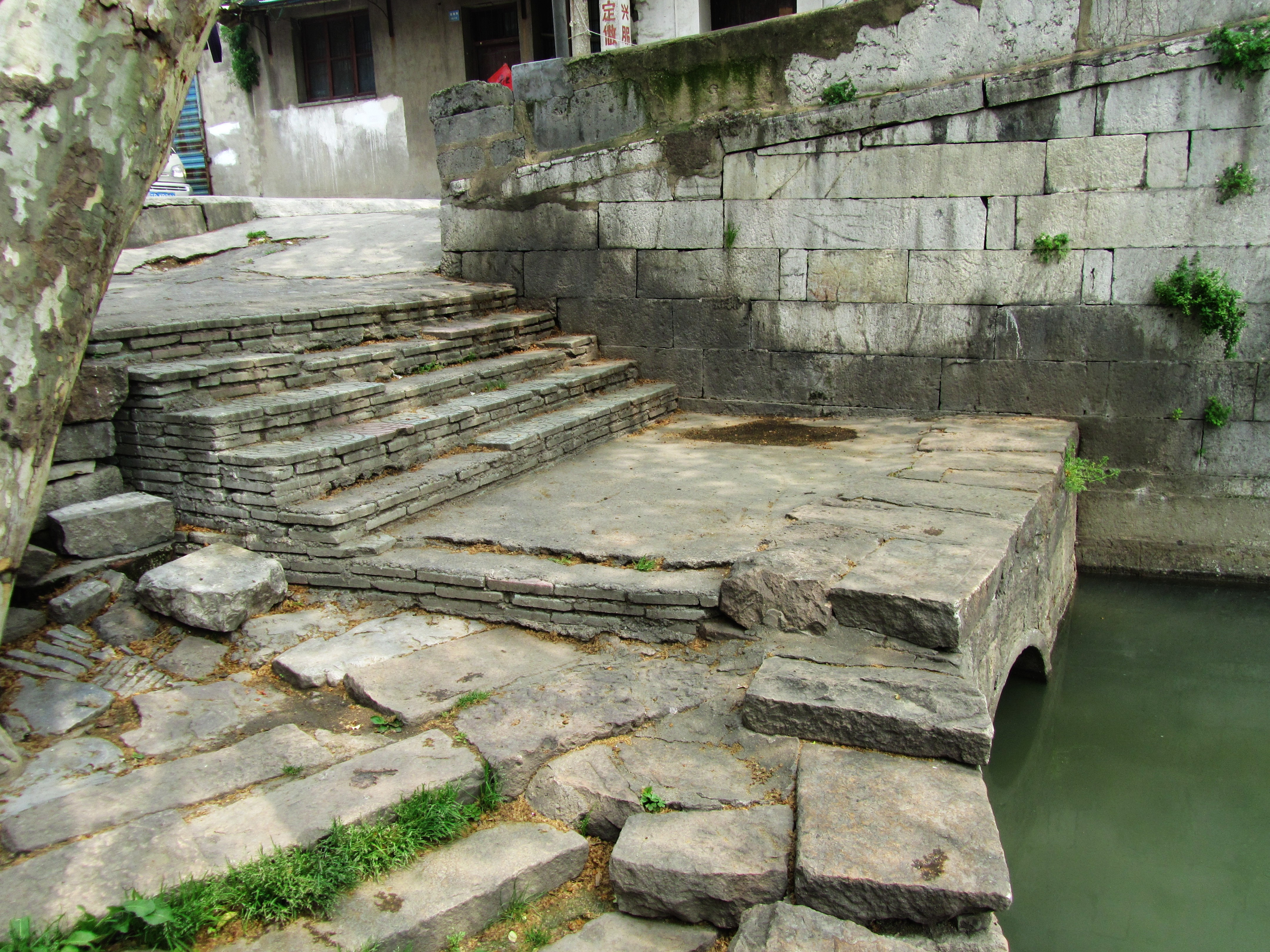
Zhongxin Bridge in April 2012

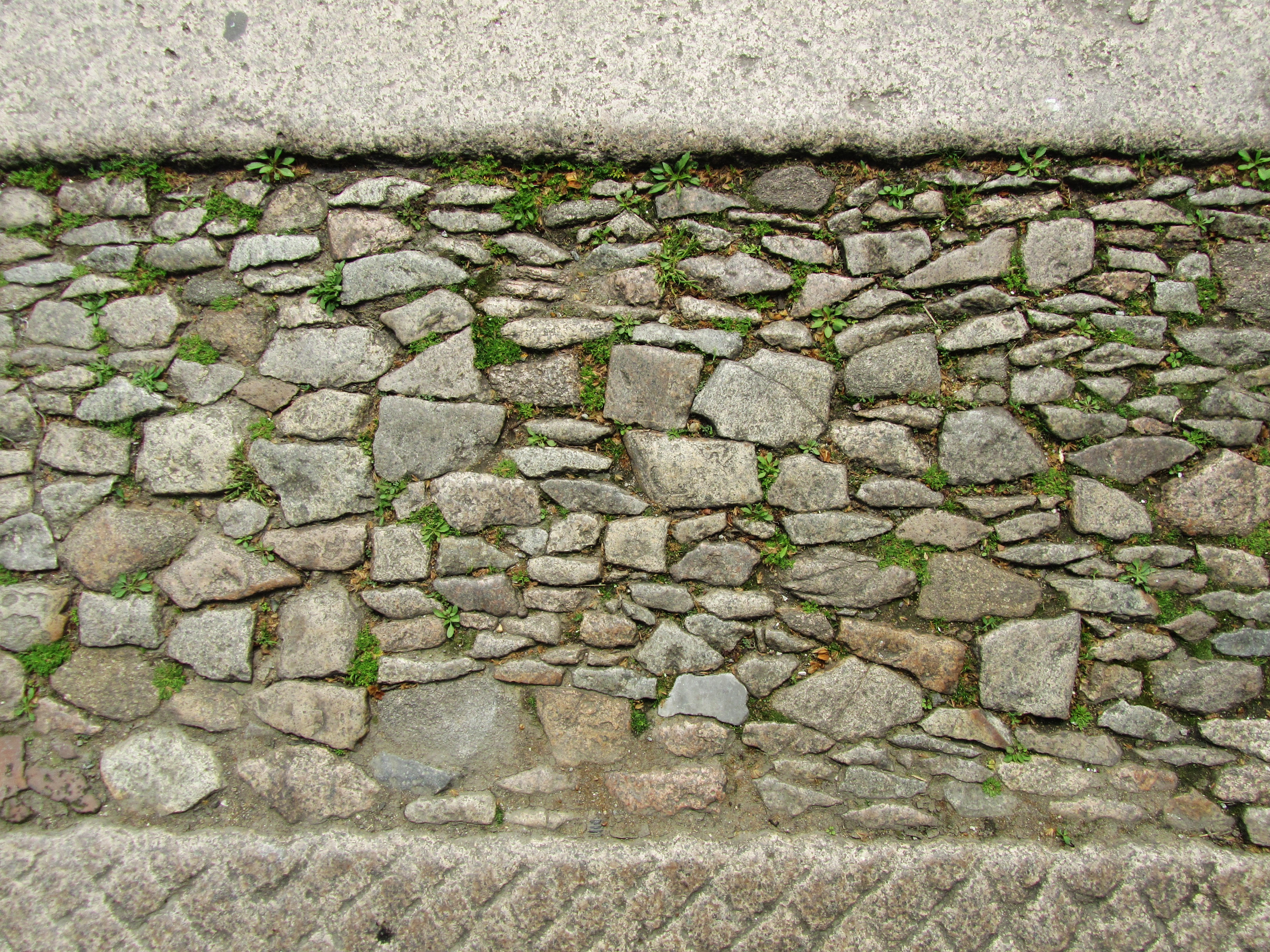
Zhongxin Bridge in April 2012
