= Changzhou Trina International School =

- CZTIS Crest

Location
- 66 Hengshan Road; Changzhou, Jiangsu, 213022; China

Information
- School type: Private-Government Cooperation, elementary school and high school
- Founded: 2012
- Principal: Alfred Liu Wang
- Grades: JK-12
- Language: English
- Website: www.cztis.com

Changzhou Trina International School (CZTIS) is a Pre-School/K-12 educational institution located in the Xinbei District of Changzhou, Jiangsu, China.

The school, which opened in 2012, is a joint venture commissioned by the Changzhou Government's Department of Education and partially funded by Trina Solar, hence the addition of Trina to the name.

As of the 2015–2016 academic year, CZTIS offers an IGCSE program and is accredited by Cambridge International Examinations.
