= Changzhou Metro =

Metro system in Changzhou, China

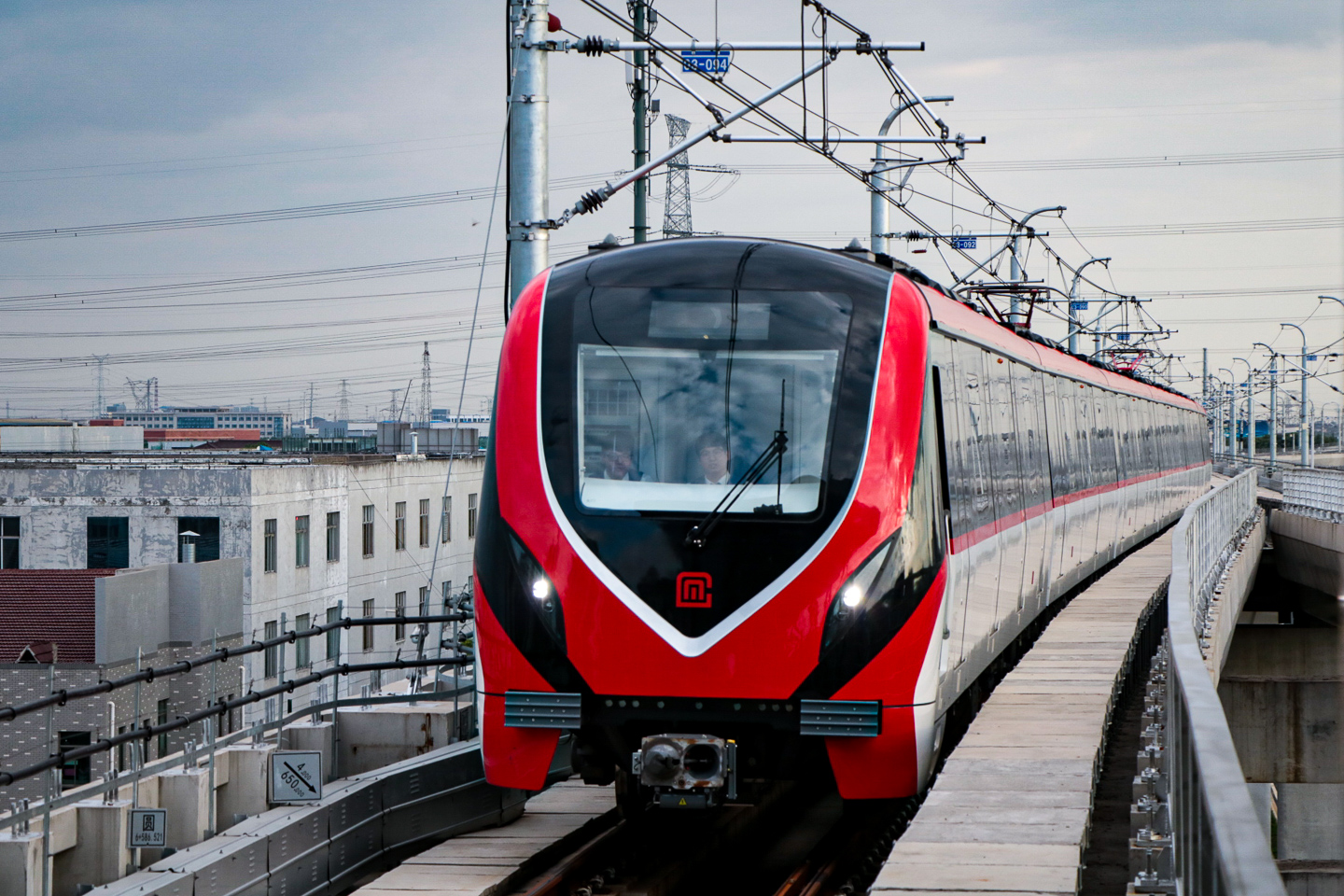

Overview
- Native name: 常州轨道交通
- Locale: Changzhou, Jiangsu, China
- Transit type: Rapid transit
- Number of lines: 2
- Number of stations: 43
- Daily ridership: 0.198 million (2024 avg.) 0.413 million (record)
- Annual ridership: 72.109 million (2024)
- Website: www.czmetro.net.cn

Operation
- Began operation: 21 September 2019; 7 years ago

Technical
- System length: 54.03 km (33.57 mi)
- Track gauge: 1,435 mm (4 ft 8 1/2 in) standard gauge
System map

The Changzhou Metro is a rapid transit system in Changzhou, Jiangsu province, China.

The system started operation on 21 September 2019, with the opening of its first line, Line 1, becoming the 35th city in China with a subway in mainland China. The Changzhou Metro currently has Line 1 and Line 2 in operation, while Line 5 and Line 6 are under construction.

Announcements are made in Mandarin and English.

== Lines in operation ==
| Line | Terminals (District) | | Commencement | Length km | Stations |
|---|---|---|---|---|---|
| 1 | Forest Park (Xinbei) | Nanxiashu (Wujin) | 21 September 2019 | 34.24 | 29 |
| 2 | Qingfeng Park (Zhonglou) | Wuyi Lu (Wujin) | 28 June 2021 | 19.79 | 15 |
| Total | | | | 54.03 | 43 |

=== Line 1 ===
Line 1 started operation on 21 September 2019. Construction for Line 1 began on 28 October 2014. The first phase runs from Forest Park (森林公园) in the north to Nanxiashu (南夏墅) in the south. It is 34.24 kilometres (21.28 mi) in length with 29 stations, including 27 underground and 2 elevated. The line will be extended North for 3.5 km and South for 3.2 km.

In its first year of operation, the highest passenger flow in a single day was 243,000 on October 2 and total ridership in 2019 was 10.3 million.

=== Line 2 ===
Construction for Line 2 began on 13 February 2017. It is 19.79 kilometres (12.30 mi) in length with 15 stations, from Qingfeng Park to Wuyi Lu. It was opened on 28 June 2021.

== Future expansion ==
=== Short term plan ===
| Line | Construction start | Estimated opening | Section | Stations | Length | References |
|---|---|---|---|---|---|---|
| 1 (North ext.) | | | Forest Park - Chunjiang | 2 | 3.5 | |
| 1 (South ext.) | | | Nanxiashu - Changzhou South railway station | 2 | 3.2 | |
| 2 (West ext.) | | | Hexi - Qingfeng Park | 7 | 8.6 | |
| 2 (East ext.) | | | Wuyi Lu - Qishuyan railway station | 4 | 5.0 | |
| 5 | October 2023 | 2028 | Lanyuewan - Dongqing | 25 | 30.9 | |
| 6 | October 2024 | 2029 | Wujin Yanjiang railway station - Jianye Lu | 21 | 28.9 | |

Construction of a two-station pilot section for Line 5 at the Lanyuewan terminal commenced in October 2023. The full-scale construction of Line 5 is scheduled to begin in 2024, with an anticipated completion date set for 2028.

=== Long term plan ===
According to the "Changzhou Urban Rail Transit Construction Plan (2011～2018)", the urban rail transit network of Changzhou City is planned to consist of 6 lines by 2050.

| Line | Construction start | Estimate opening | Section | Stations | Length | References |
|---|---|---|---|---|---|---|
| 3 | | | Changzhou North railway station - Lijia | | | |
| 4 | | | Photovoltaics Industry Part - Jianhu Parking | | | |

== Fares ==
The Changzhou Metro system operates with a base fare of 2 yuan, covering the initial 5 kilometers, and subsequent price increments at intervals of 5, 7 and 9 kilometers, with each step adding 1 yuan to the fare. Specifically, fares are structured as follows: 2 yuan for journeys up to 5 kilometers, 3 yuan for trips spanning 5-10 kilometers, 4 yuan for distances of 10-15 kilometers, 5 yuan for 15-22 kilometers, 6 yuan for 22-29 kilometers, and a progressive increase of 1 yuan for every additional 9 kilometers beyond 29 kilometers.

== Trains ==
Trains for the first phase were manufactured by CRRC Nanjing Puzhen. Changzhou Rail Transit Line 1 operates Type B cars, with each train consisting of 6 cars - 4 motor cars and 2 trailer cars. The first phase of the project involved the procurement of 36 trainsets. A 6-car set spans approximately 120 meters (393 ft 8 in) in length and is 2.9 meters (9 ft 6 in) wide, capable of reaching a maximum operating speed of 80 km/h (50 mph). Each car features 4 pairs of 1.3 meters (4 ft 3 in) wide doors on both sides, accommodating up to 2062 passengers. The trains are constructed using lightweight aluminum alloy material, designed for a service life of 30 years.
