= Changzhou North railway station =

Railway station in Changzhou, China

Changzhoubei 常州北
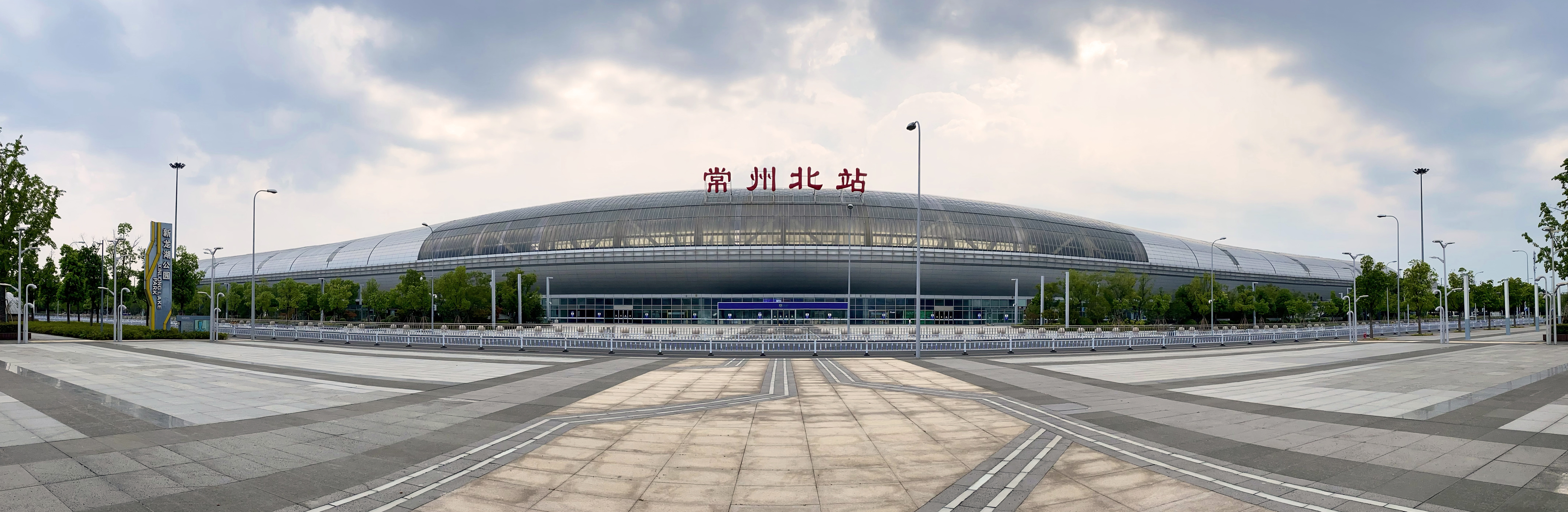
- Changzhou North Railway Station

General information
- Other names: Changzhou North
- Location: Xinbei District, Changzhou, Jiangsu; China
- Coordinates: 31.856291°N 119.949996°E
- Operated by: Shanghai Railway Bureau; China Railway Corporation
- Line: Jinghu High-Speed Railway
- Connections: 1

History
- Opened: July 1, 2010
Location

The Changzhou North railway station (Chinese: 常州北站) is a high-speed railway station in Changzhou, Jiangsu, China. It serves the Beijing–Shanghai high-speed railway.

== Station information ==
Changzhou North railway station has 2 platforms and a total of 6 tracks. The station building features an oval cylindrical design.

The fish-like shape of the station building symbolizes the connotations of Changzhou, known as the "Land of Fish and Rice". The main building of the station covers an area of nearly 13,000 square meters.

== Expansion Plan ==
In 2024, an expansion of the station is being planned. In the southern square of the station, a newly constructed 6,600 square meter covered walkway and a north-south transfer corridor allow passengers to enter and exit the station without exposure to wind and rain. The covered walkway will also connect to the underground parking garage, enabling passengers to reach the garage directly via escalators.

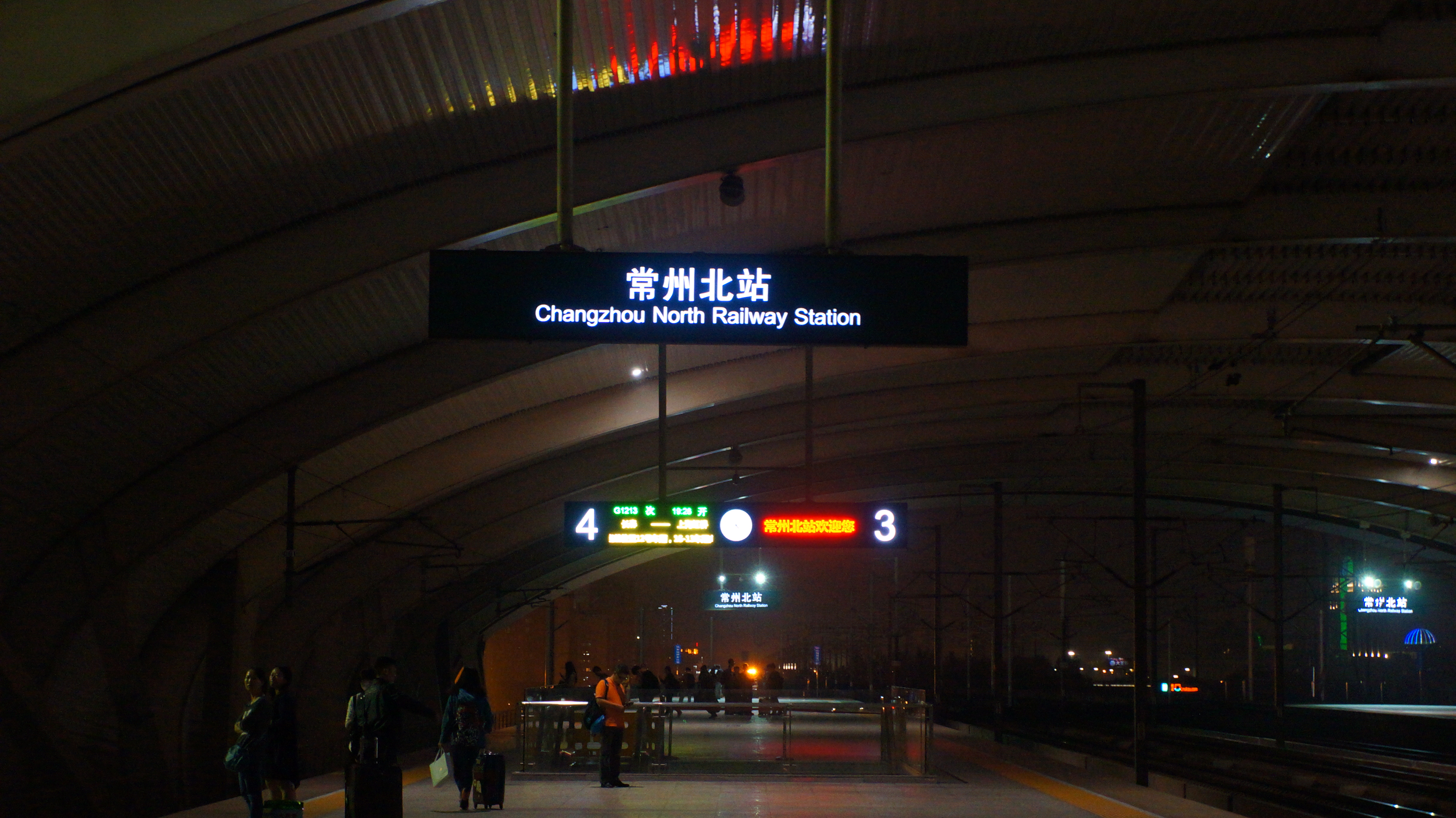
Platform 3,4 of Changzhoubei Railway Station

== See also ==
- Changzhou railway station

Preceding station	China Railway High-speed	Following station
Danyang North towards Beijing South or Tianjin West	Beijing–Shanghai high-speed railway Part of the Shanghai–Wuhan–Chengdu passenger-dedicated railway	Wuxi East towards Shanghai Hongqiao
