= Xinbei, Changzhou =

Xinbei 新北区
- type = District
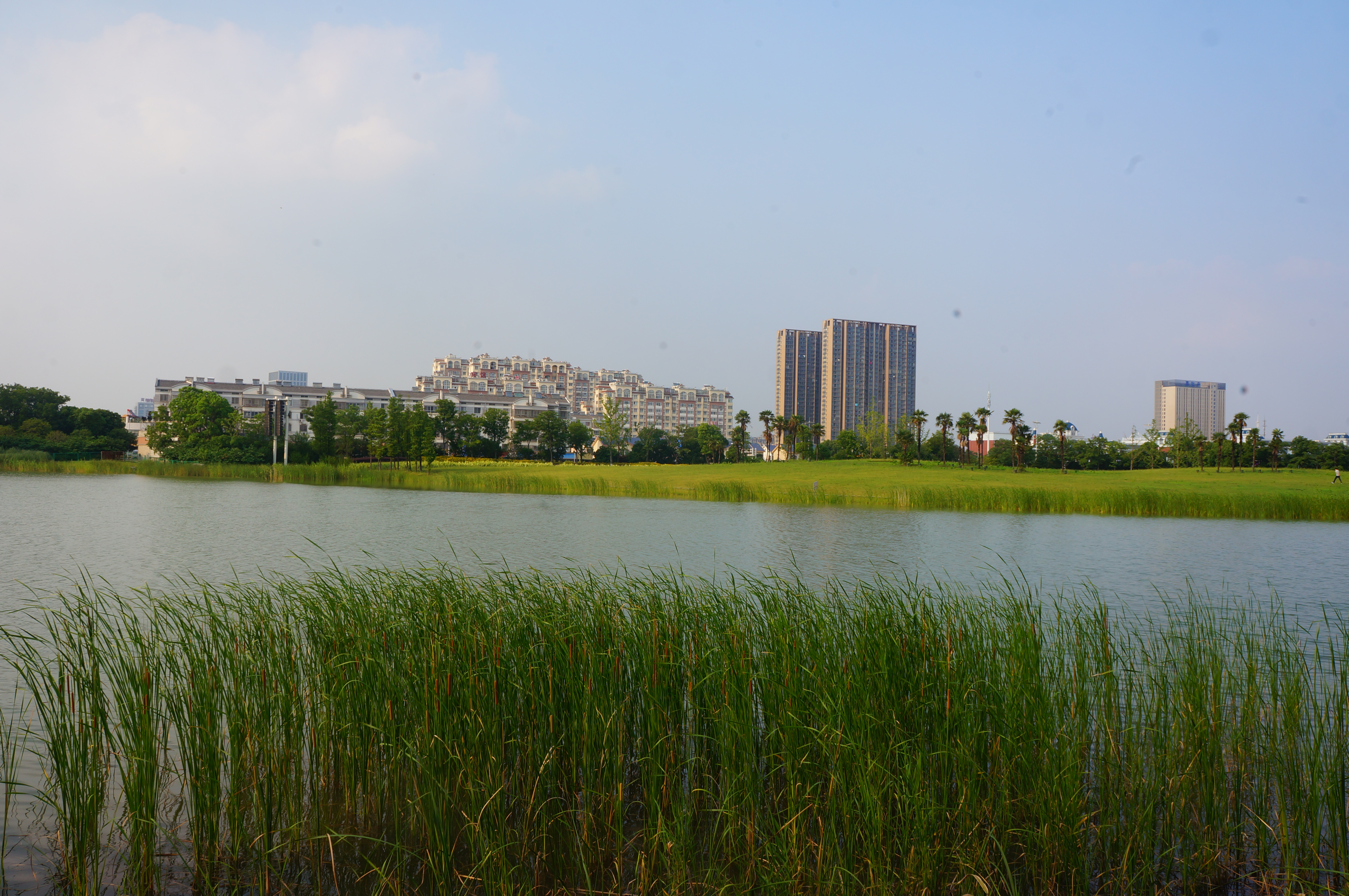

- Location in Jiangsu
- Coordinates: 31°55′43″N 119°53′42″E
- Country: China
- Province: Jiangsu
- Prefecture-level city: Changzhou

Area
  - Total: 439.16 km^{2} (169.56 sq mi)

Population (2020)
  - Total: 883,125
  - Density: 2,010.9/km^{2} (5,208.3/sq mi)
- Time zone: UTC+8 (China Standard)
- Postal code: 213001

Xinbei District (simplified Chinese: 新北区; traditional Chinese: 新北區; pinyin: Xīnběi Qū; lit. 'new north'), alternatively called the New District or the High-tech Development Zone (simplified Chinese: 国家高新区; traditional Chinese: 國家高新區; pinyin: Guójiā Gāoxīn Qū; lit. 'National high-tech district'), is one of five districts under the jurisdiction of Changzhou in Jiangsu province of China. The local language is the Changzhou dialect of Wu Chinese. It covers an area of 425 km^{2} (164 sq mi) in the northern part of Changzhou's administrative area. In 2005 the total population was recorded at 480,000 people. The postal code for the district is 213161.

The district was established in August 1992 by the regional government as a high-tech manufacturing area. Businesses in the region also receive some preferential policies granted by the local government.

It is also home to 7,636 domestic and overseas companies, 18 of which are on Fortune Global 500 list. As a result, a number of foreign styled restaurants and bars have been able to establish themselves, catering mostly to the expatriate community.

Xinbei is also home to the Changzhou campus of Hohai University, Changzhou Trina International School, and the Changzhou International School.

The theme park, China Dinosaur Park which was built in 2000 is also located in Xinbei District. It is ranked number 11 in Asian theme parks. The Changzhou municipal government was also moved to Xinbei. As well as many important high schools such as Beijiao High School. Xinbei one of the most developed districts in Changzhou city.

== Administrative divisions ==
At present, Xinbei District has 3 subdistricts and 6 towns.

3 subdistricts

- Hehai (河海街道)
- Sanjing (三井街道)
- Longhutang (龙虎塘街道)

6 towns

- Chunjiang (春江镇)
- Menghe (孟河镇)
- Xinqiao (新桥镇)
- Xuejia (薛家镇)
- Luoxi (罗溪镇)
- Xixiashu (西夏墅镇)

== See also ==
- Zhongguancun
