= Tianning, Changzhou =

Tianning 天宁区
- District
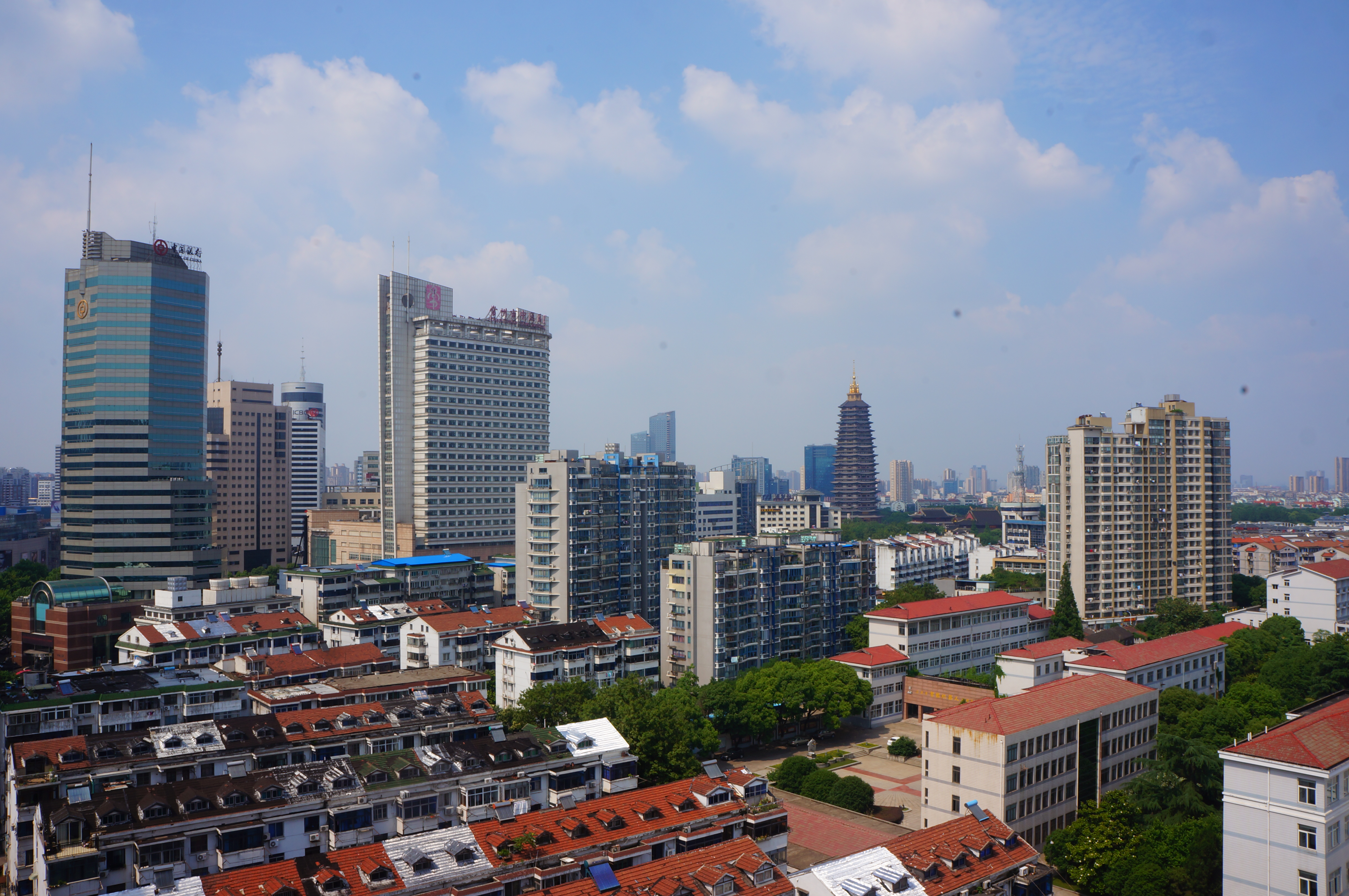
- Tianning District in June 2017

- Location in Jiangsu
- Coordinates: 31°47′34″N 119°59′57″E
- Country: People's Republic of China
- Province: Jiangsu
- Prefecture-level city: Changzhou

Area
  - District: 153.93 km^{2} (59.43 sq mi)

Population (2020)
  - District: 668,906
  - Density: 4,345.5/km^{2} (11,255/sq mi)
  - Urban: 609,730 (91%)
  - Rural: 59,176 (9%)
- Time zone: UTC+8 (China Standard)
- Postal code: 213000

Tianning District (simplified Chinese: 天宁区; traditional Chinese: 天寧區; pinyin: Tiānníng Qū; lit. 'heaven tranquility') is one of five districts under the jurisdiction of Changzhou in Jiangsu province of the People's Republic of China. The local language is the Changzhou dialect of Wu Chinese. The postal code for the district is 213003.

The Tianning District covers an area of 68 square kilometers. In 2020 the total population was recorded at 668,906 people.

The area is most famous for the Tianning Temple for which the district is named. The temple is home to the tallest pagoda in the world. The pagoda forms the most notable landmark in the downtown area.

Tianning District is also home to Hongmei Park (红梅公园; 紅梅公園), which borders the temple grounds to the north. The park is reported to attract 200 million tourists each year. It is also home to Red Plum Pavilion, a structure originally built 1000 years ago, as well as the Yizhou Pavilion, built to commemorate the poet Su Dongpo, who died in Changzhou.

== Administrative divisions ==
At present, Tianning District has 6 subdistricts and 1 other.

6 subdistricts

- Lanling (兰陵街道)
- Chashan (茶山街道)
- Diaozhuang (雕庄街道)
- Hongmei (红梅街道)
- Qinglong (青龙街道)
- Tianning (天宁街道)

1 Other

- Tianning Economic Development Zone (天宁经济开发区)

== Economy ==
Da Niang Dumpling has its corporate headquarters in the district.

== Tourist attractions ==
The district houses many ancient bridges, such as Xinfang Bridge and Zhongxin Bridge.

Chongfa Temple is a former Buddhist temple located within the Renmin Park and now is a teahouse.
