= Hengduan Mountains =

Mountain range in southwest China

- Daxue Mountains, including Mount Gongga, the tallest summit in the Hengduan Mountains

Highest point
- Peak: Mount Gongga
- Elevation: 7,556 m (24,790 ft)

Geography
- Countries: China and Burma
- Range coordinates: 27°30′N 99°00′E

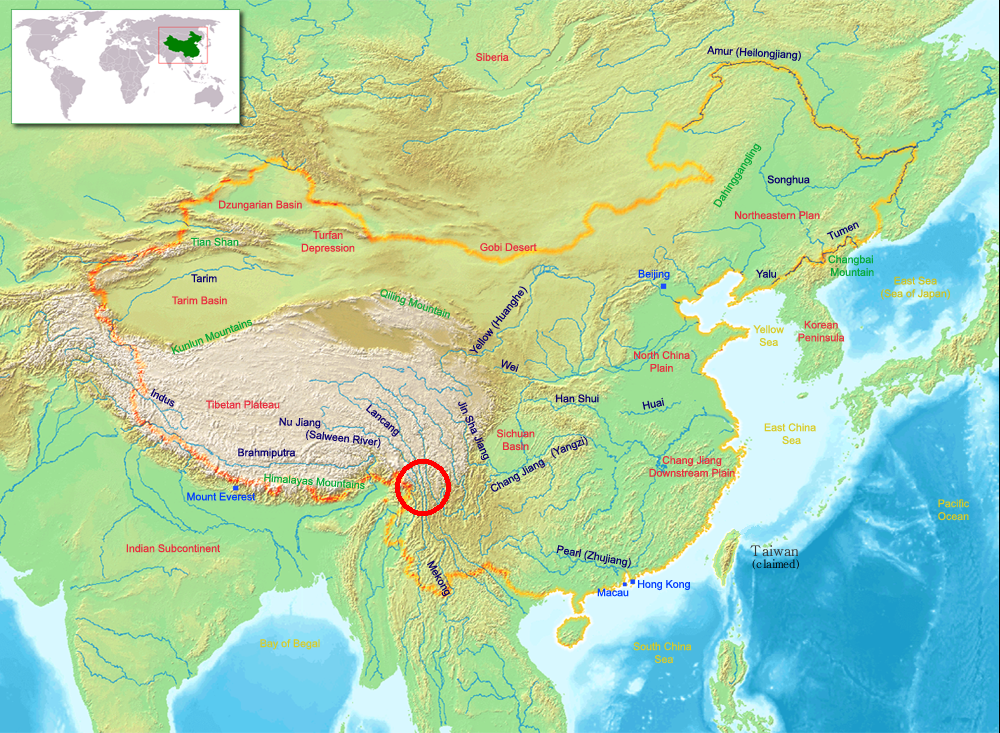
Three Parallel Rivers region - heart of Hengduan Shan - relative to South, Southeast and East Asia.

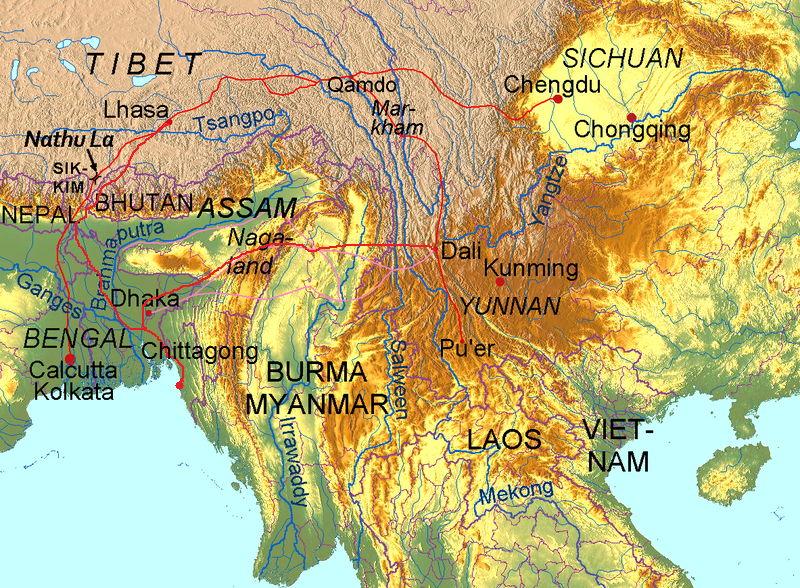
Larger scale political / relief map of area (Hengduan Shan / Three Gorges region top centre).

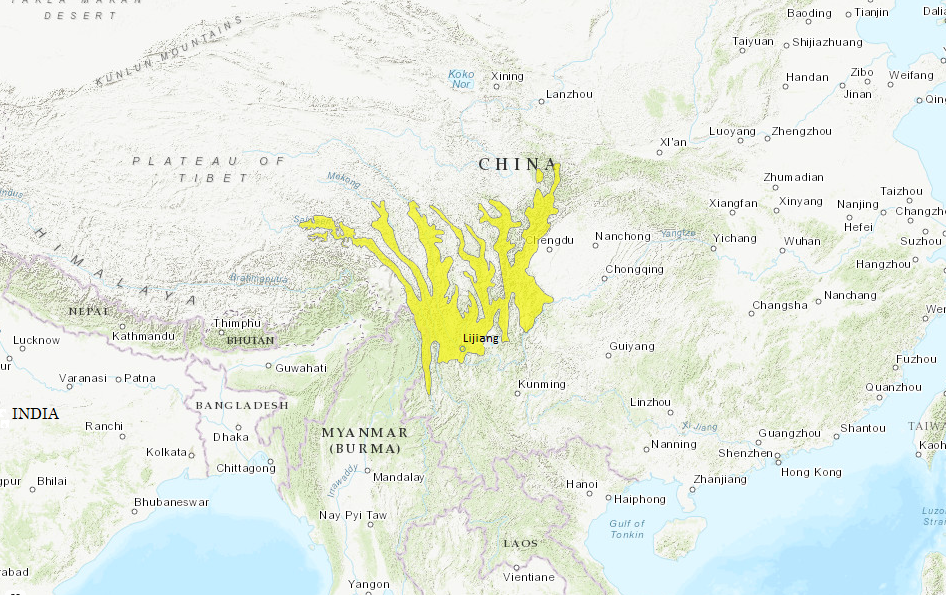
Map of East Asia, showing location of Hengduan Mountains (with particular reference to their coniferous forests) and their only major settlement Lijiang, Yunnan Province.

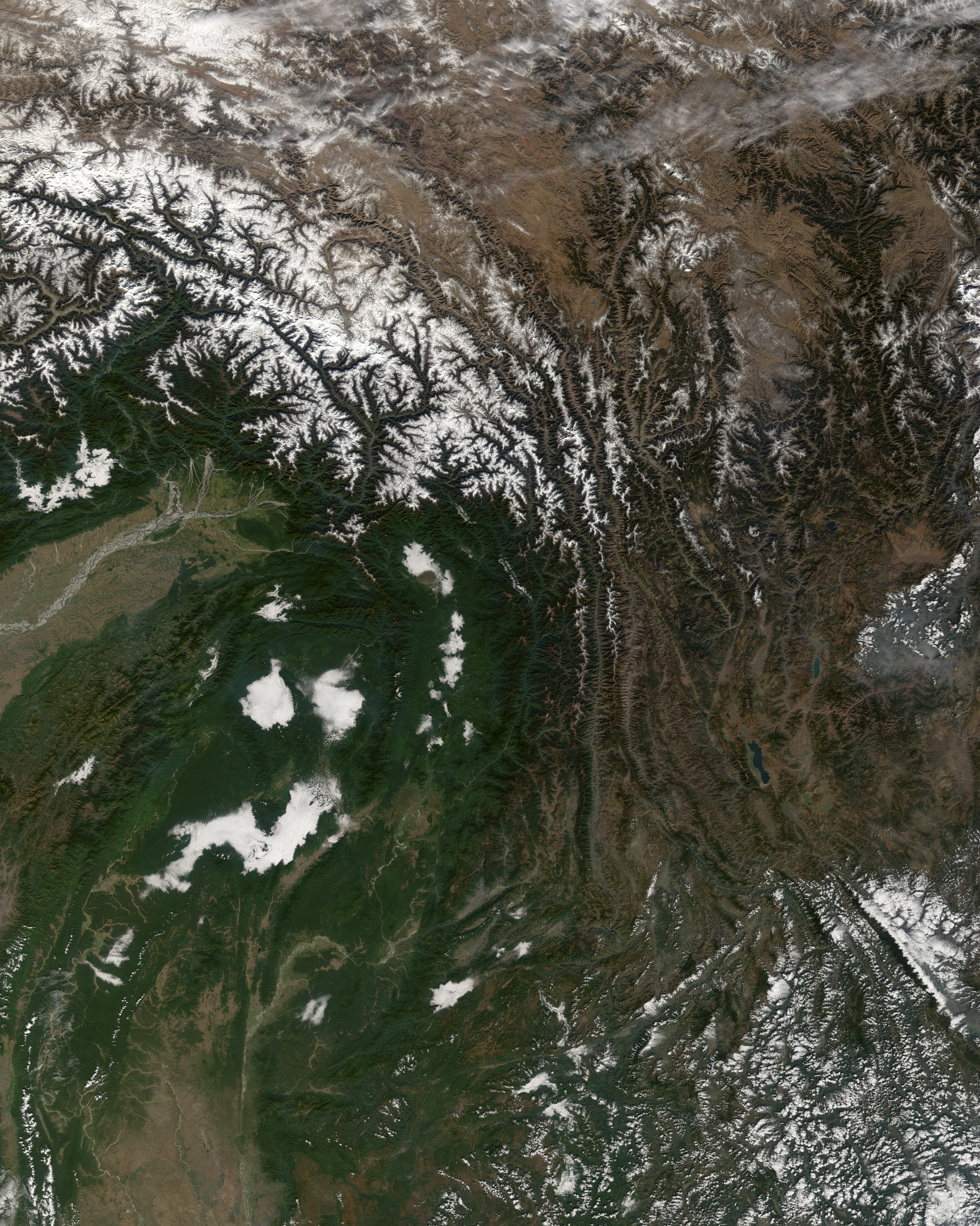
Satellite view of the Hengduan Mountains

The Hengduan Mountains (simplified Chinese: 横断山脉; traditional Chinese: 橫斷山脈; pinyin: Héngduàn Shānmài) are a group of mountain ranges in southwest China that connect the southeast portions of the Tibetan Plateau with the Yunnan–Guizhou Plateau. The Hengduan Mountains are primarily large north-south mountain ranges that effectively separate lowlands in northern Myanmar from the lowlands of the Sichuan Basin. These ranges are characterized by significant vertical relief originating from the Indian subcontinent's collision with the Eurasian Plate, and further carved out by the major rivers draining the eastern Tibetan Plateau. These rivers, the Yangtze, Mekong, and Salween, are recognized today as the Three Parallel Rivers UNESCO World Heritage Site.

The Hengduan Mountains cover much of western present-day Sichuan province as well as the northwestern portions of Yunnan, the easternmost section of the Tibet Autonomous Region, and touching upon parts of southern Qinghai. Additionally, some parts of eastern Kachin State in neighbouring Myanmar are considered part of the Hengduan group. The Hengduan Mountains are approximately 900 kilometres (560 mi) long, stretching from 33°N to 25°N. Depending on extent of the definition, the Hengduan Mountains are also approximately 400 kilometres (250 mi) wide under the narrowest definition, ranging from 98°E to 102°E. The area covered by these ranges roughly corresponds with the Tibetan region known as Kham.

The Hengduan Mountains subalpine conifer forests is a palaearctic ecoregion in the Temperate coniferous forests biome that covers portions of the mountains.

== Geography ==
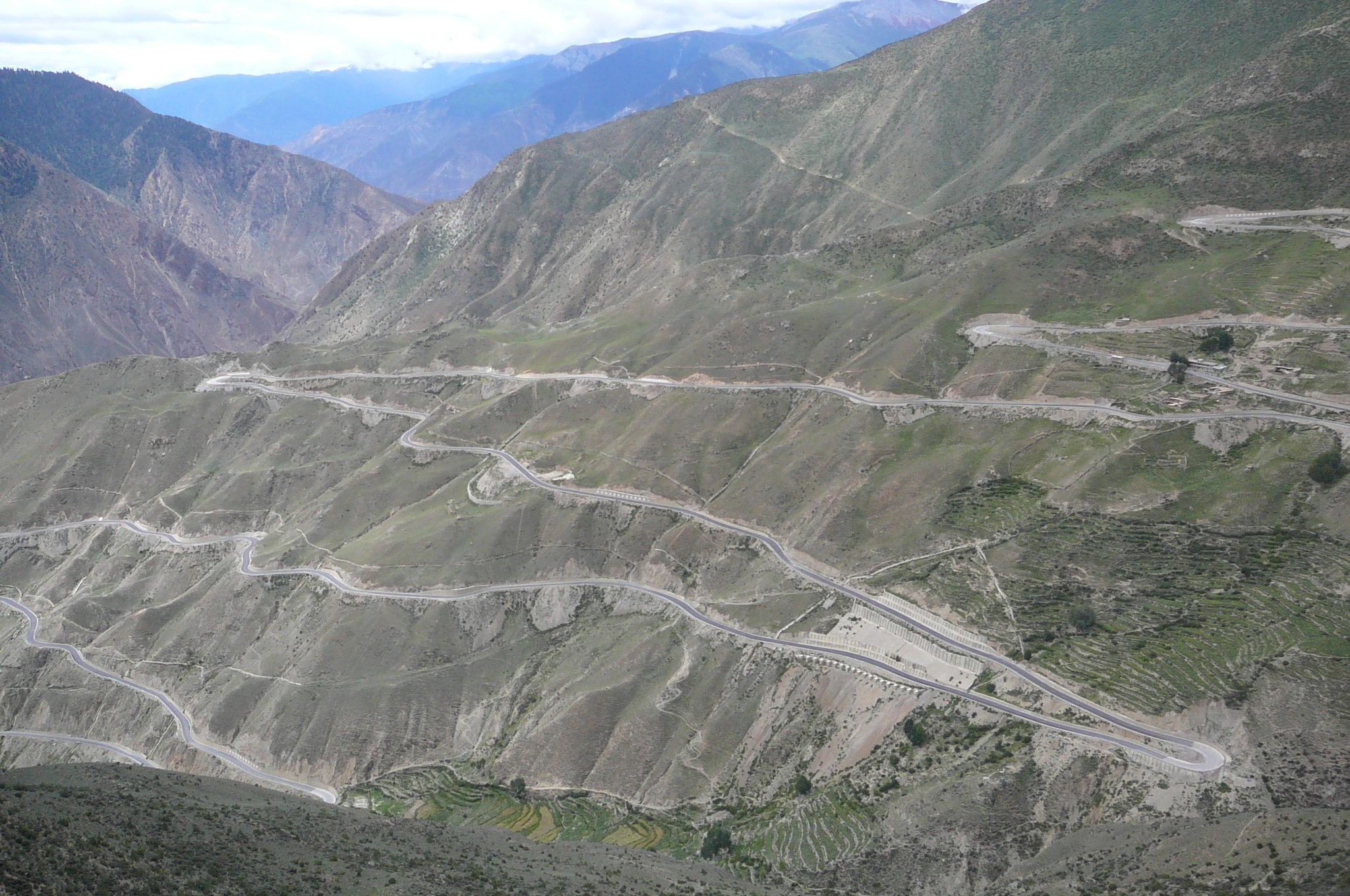
A bird's-eye view of the "Nujiang 72 turns" in Tibet.

The Hengduan Mountain system consists of many component mountain ranges, most of which run roughly north to south. These mountain ranges, in turn, can be further divided into various subranges. The component ranges of the Hengduan are separated by deep river valleys that channel the waters of many of Southeast Asia's great rivers. The core of the Hengduan Mountains can be divided into four major component ranges, described below.

- The westernmost primary range of the Hengduan runs north-south between the Salween (Nu) and Mekong (Lancang) Rivers. The northern half of this range, found in the Tibet Autonomous Region, is called the Taniantaweng Mountains while the southern half, in Yunnan, is called the Nu Mountains. A major subrange along this system is the Meili Snow Mountains and their highest peak, Kawagebo.
- Moving eastward, the next major subsection of the Hengduan Mountains is the range running between the Mekong (Lancang) and Yangtze (Jinsha) Rivers. The northernmost parts of this range are called the Mangkam Mountains, the middle section is known as the Ninchin Mountains, and the southern end is called the Yun Range. The Yulong Mountains are a subrange of this system and the highest peak here is Jade Dragon Snow Mountain's Shanzidou. Eastern Himalaya, part of larger Himalaya mountains, is Hengduan Mountain's immediate neighbor to its west.
- The third primary component of the Hengduan ranges is the section running between the Yangtze (Jinsha) and Yalong Rivers. This section is known for almost its entire length as the Shaluli Mountains except for the northernmost subrange that is called the Chola Mountains. The highest point of this entire section is the Ge'nyen Massif.
- The easternmost of the Hengduan core ranges is the Daxue Mountains between the Yalong River and Dadu River. This range is dominated by Mount Gongga, the highest peak in the entire Hengduan group as well as the highest peak east of the Himalayas.
- In addition to the four core systems, described above, some adjacent ranges are also sometimes included as part of the Hengduan group. To the west, the Gaoligong Mountains form an additional barrier along the Salween's western edge, but are more accurately described as an extension of the Baxoila Ling range connecting with the eastern Nyenchen Tanglha Mountains across central Tibet. To the east, the Qionglai Mountains and the Min Mountains are sometimes included as part of the Hengduan Mountains as these two ranges form the eastern edges of the Tibetan Plateau.

== Ecosystems ==
The Hengduan Mountains support a range of habitats, from subtropical to temperate to montane biomes. The mountains are largely covered by subalpine coniferous forests. Elevations range from 1,300 to 6,000 metres (4,300 to 19,700 ft). The dense, pristine forests, the relative isolation, and the fact that most of the area remained free from glaciation during the ice ages provides a very complex habitat with a high degree of biological diversity.

The ecoregions that coincide with the Hengduan Mountains are:

- The Southeast Tibet shrub and meadows in the higher elevation and northern parts of the Hengduan
- The Hengduan Mountains subalpine conifer forests in northern Yunnan and western Sichuan parts of the central Hengduan
- The Nujiang Langcang Gorge alpine conifer and mixed forests along the westernmost ranges of the Hengduan
- The Qionglai-Minshan conifer forests in the east parts of the Hengduan along the edge of the Sichuan Basin
- The Yunnan Plateau subtropical evergreen forests at the southern parts of the Hengduan where the mountains transition to the Yungui Plateau
- The Northern Indochina subtropical forests in the Nu Mountains, a southwestern component range of the Hengduan in Yunnan

Additionally, the lowest elevation portions of the Jinsha (Yangtze) River and Nu (Salween) River valleys in the southern Hengduan ranges are classified by the Chinese government as a tropical savanna environment.

The easternmost ranges of the Hengduan are home to the rare and endangered giant panda. Other species native to the mountains are the Chinese yew (Taxus chinensis) and various other rare plants, deer, and primates.

== Gallery ==
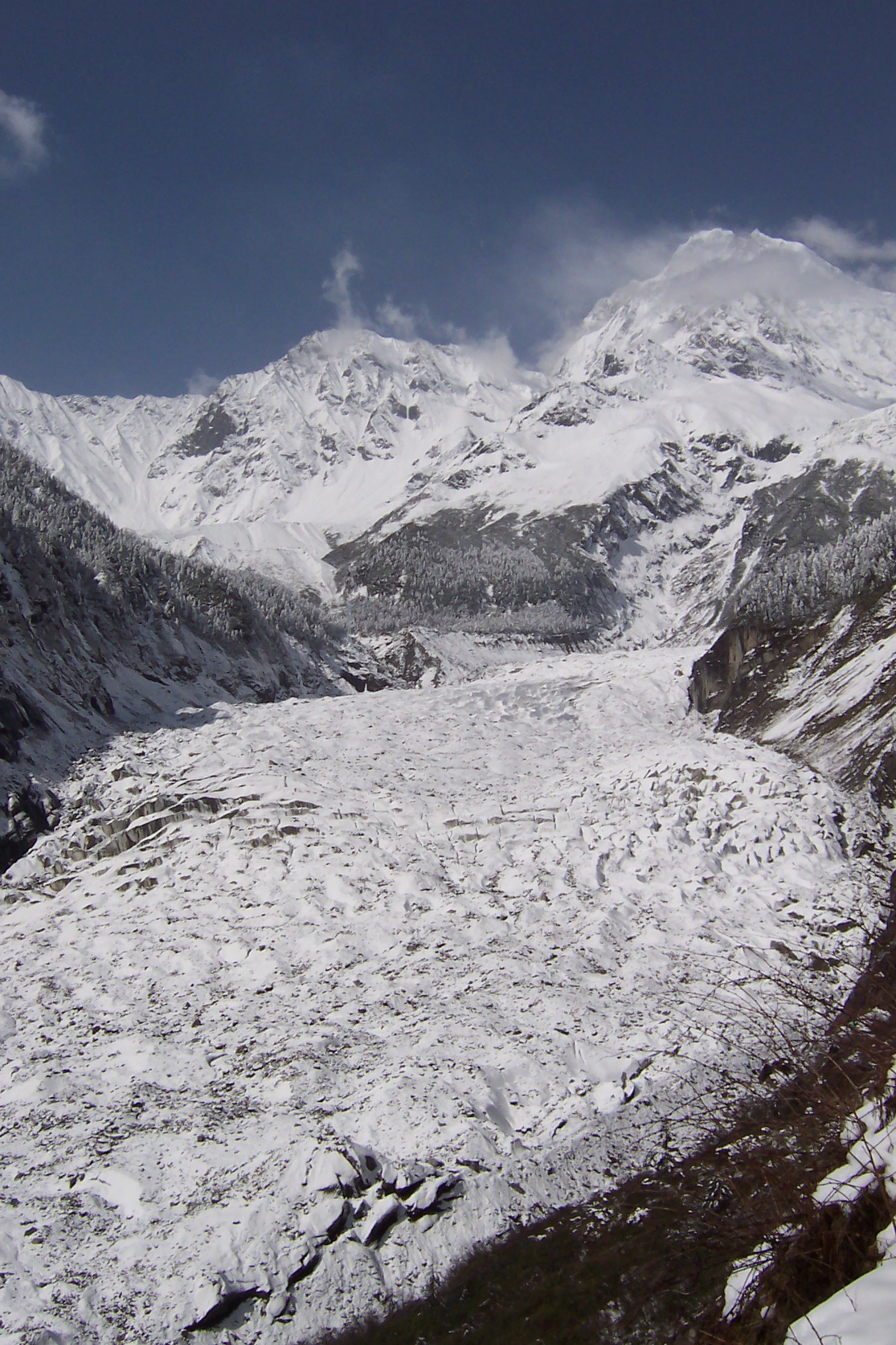
Hailuogou glacier, slopes of Mount Gongga (Minya Konka), Sichuan province.

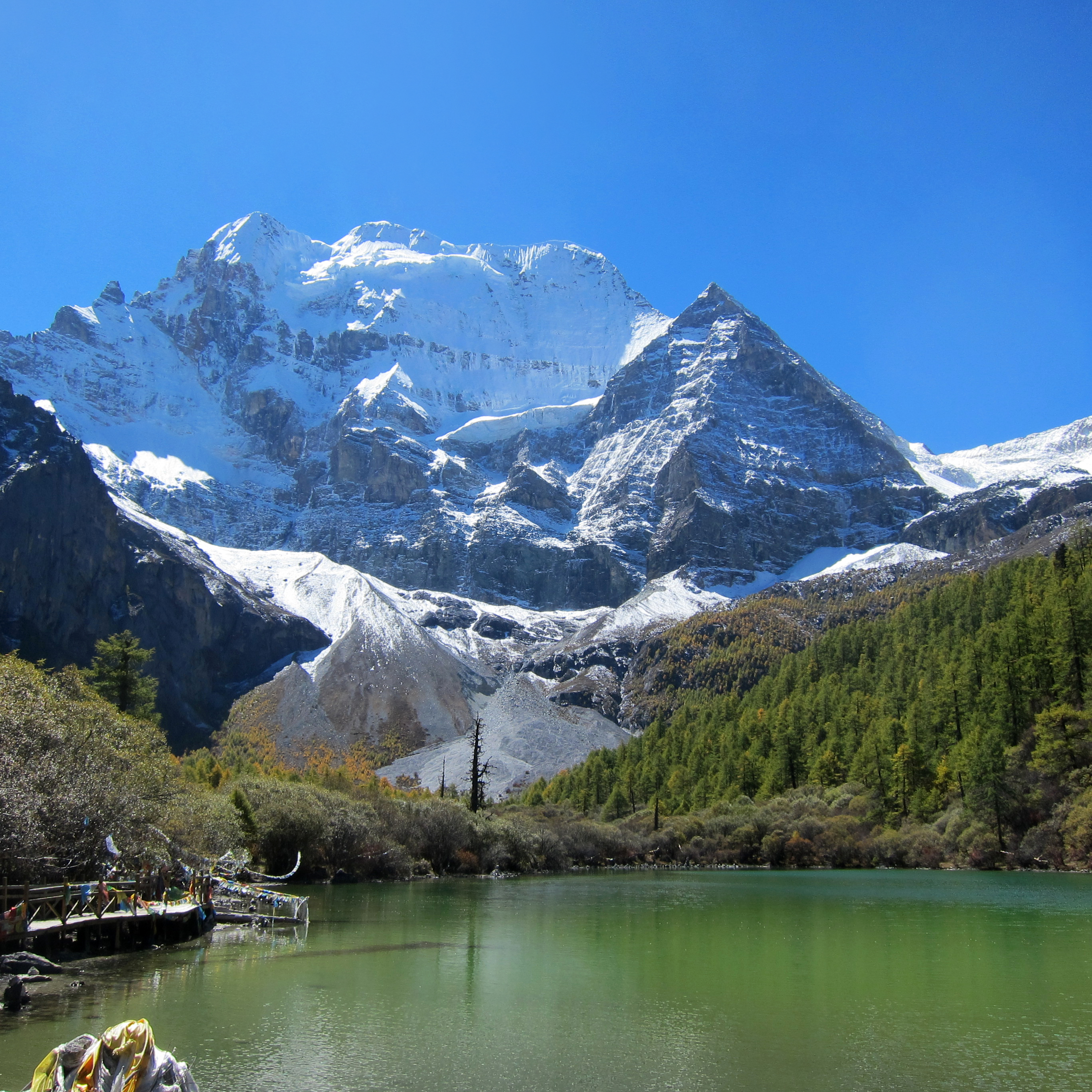
Mount Chenrezig, seen from Yading Xin river, southwest Sichuan. Highest peak of Yading range.

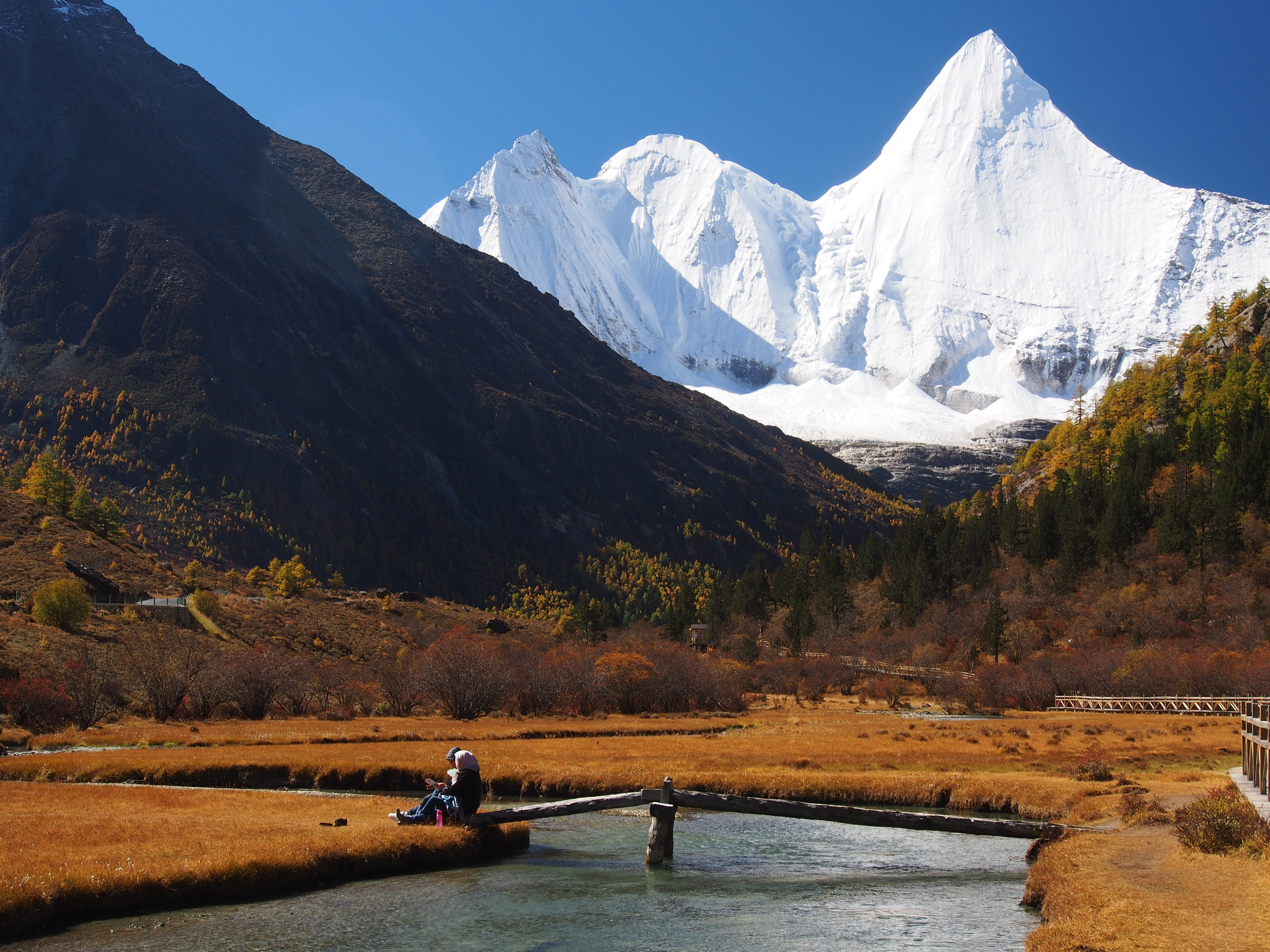
Mount Jampelyang, Yading range, southwest Sichuan.

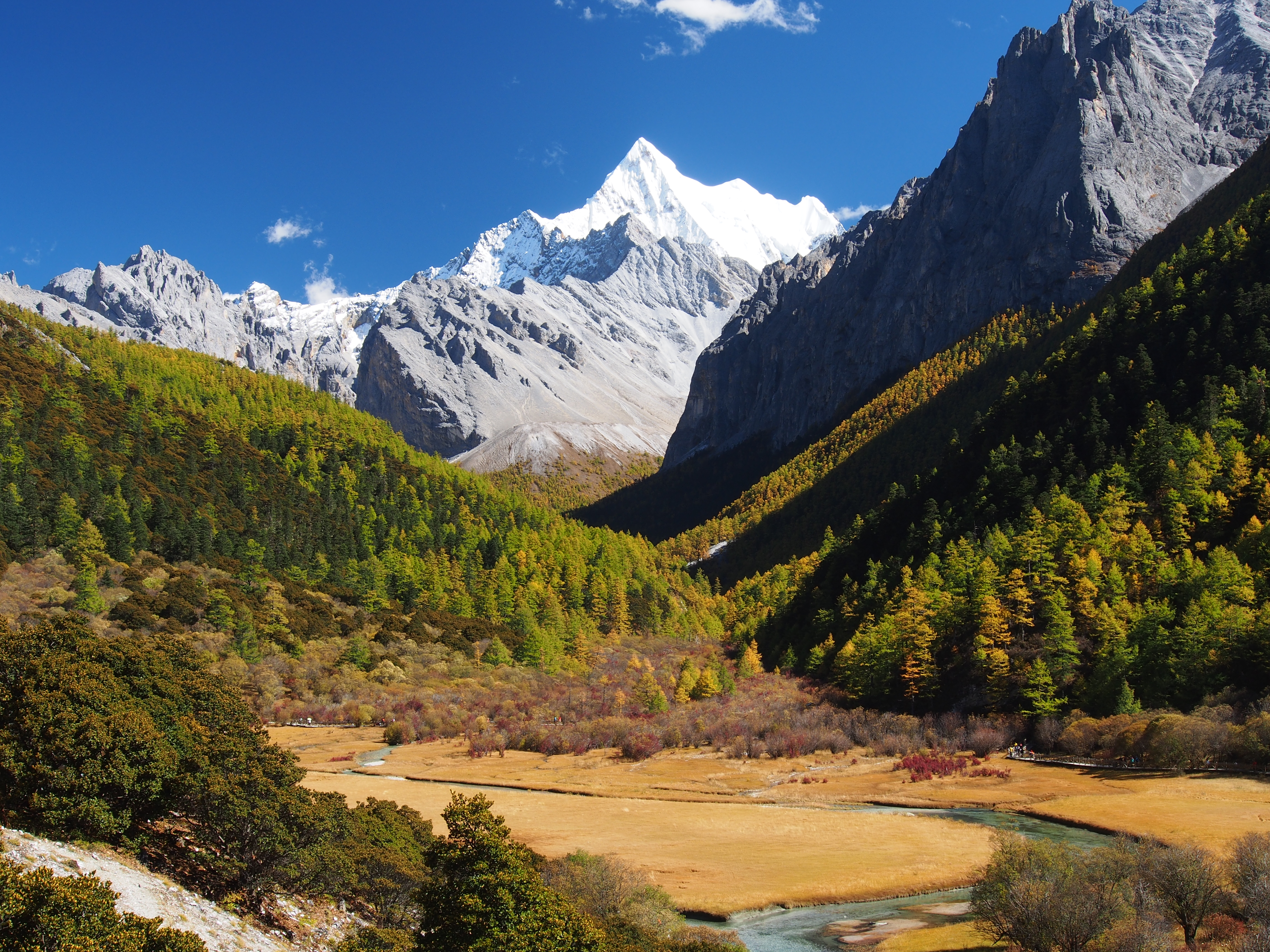
Chonggu grassland and conifer-clad foothills of Mount Chanadorje, snow-clad in background. Yading range.

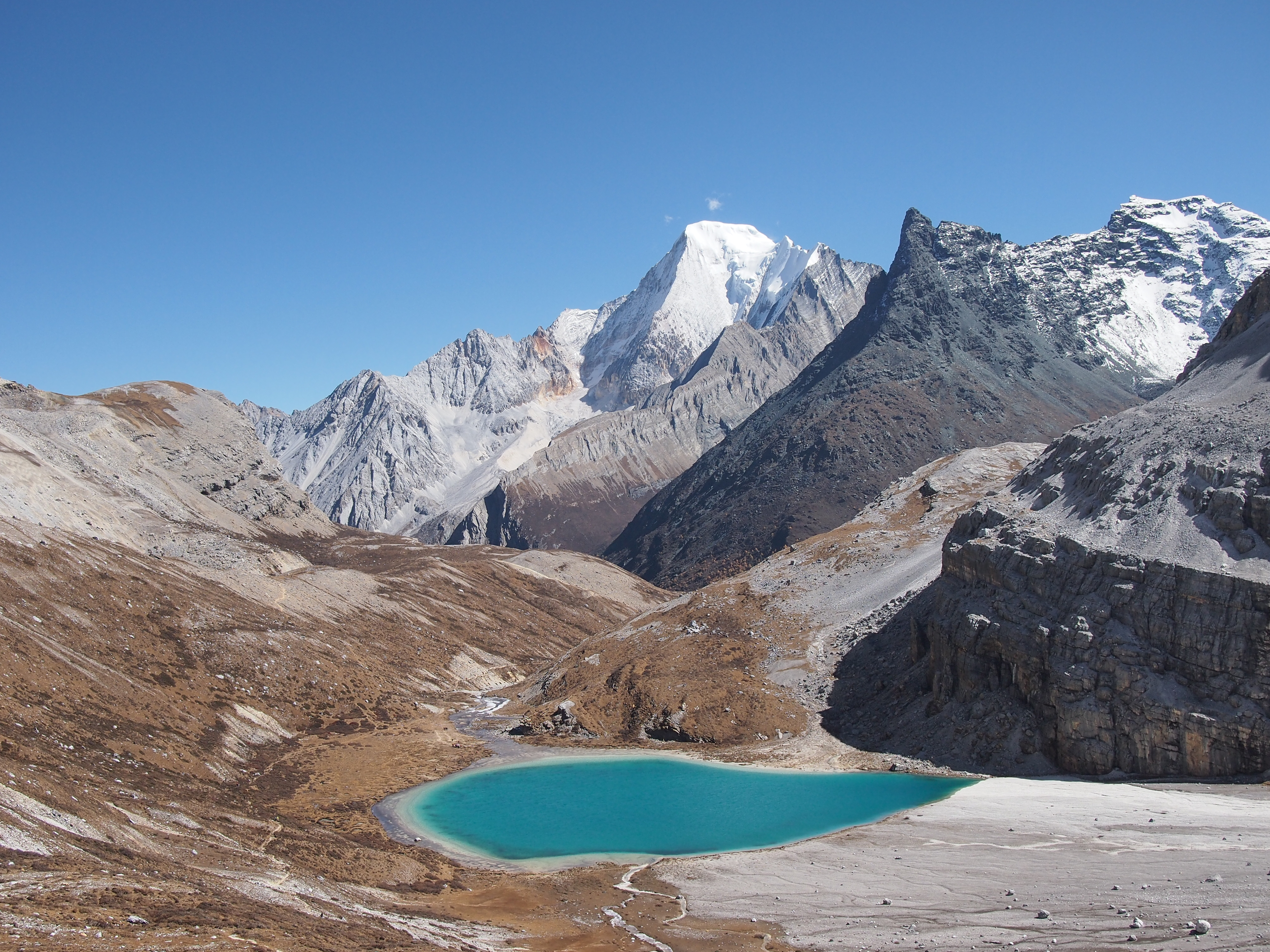
Lake at foot of Mount Chanadorje, Yading range, southwestern Sichuan.

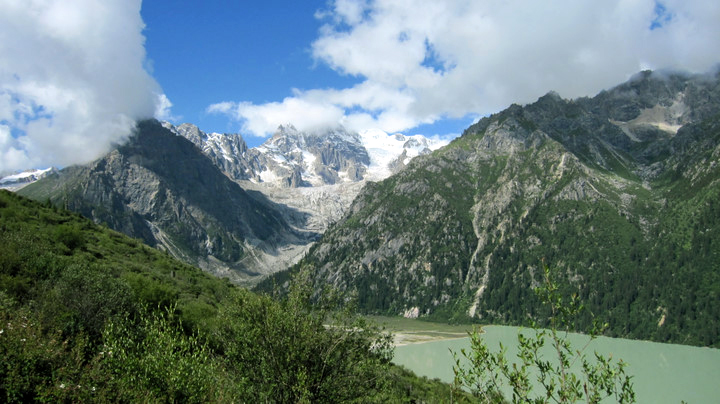
Wooded slopes of Chola Mountains, Sichuan province.

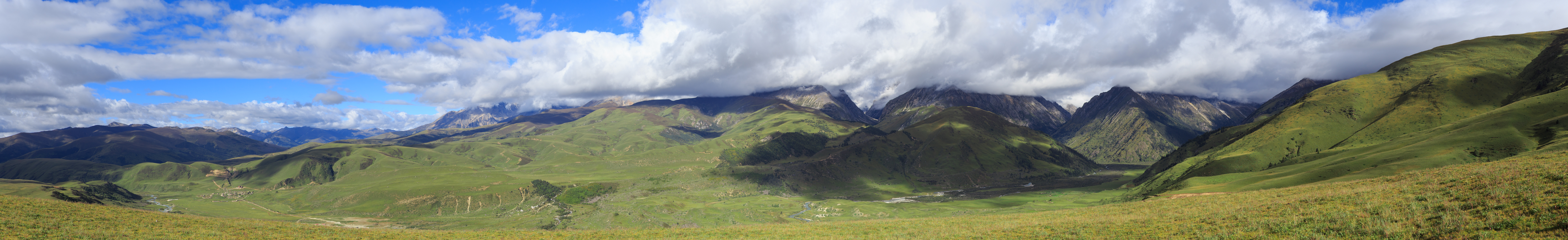
Panorama of Ge'nyen massif, Sichuan province.

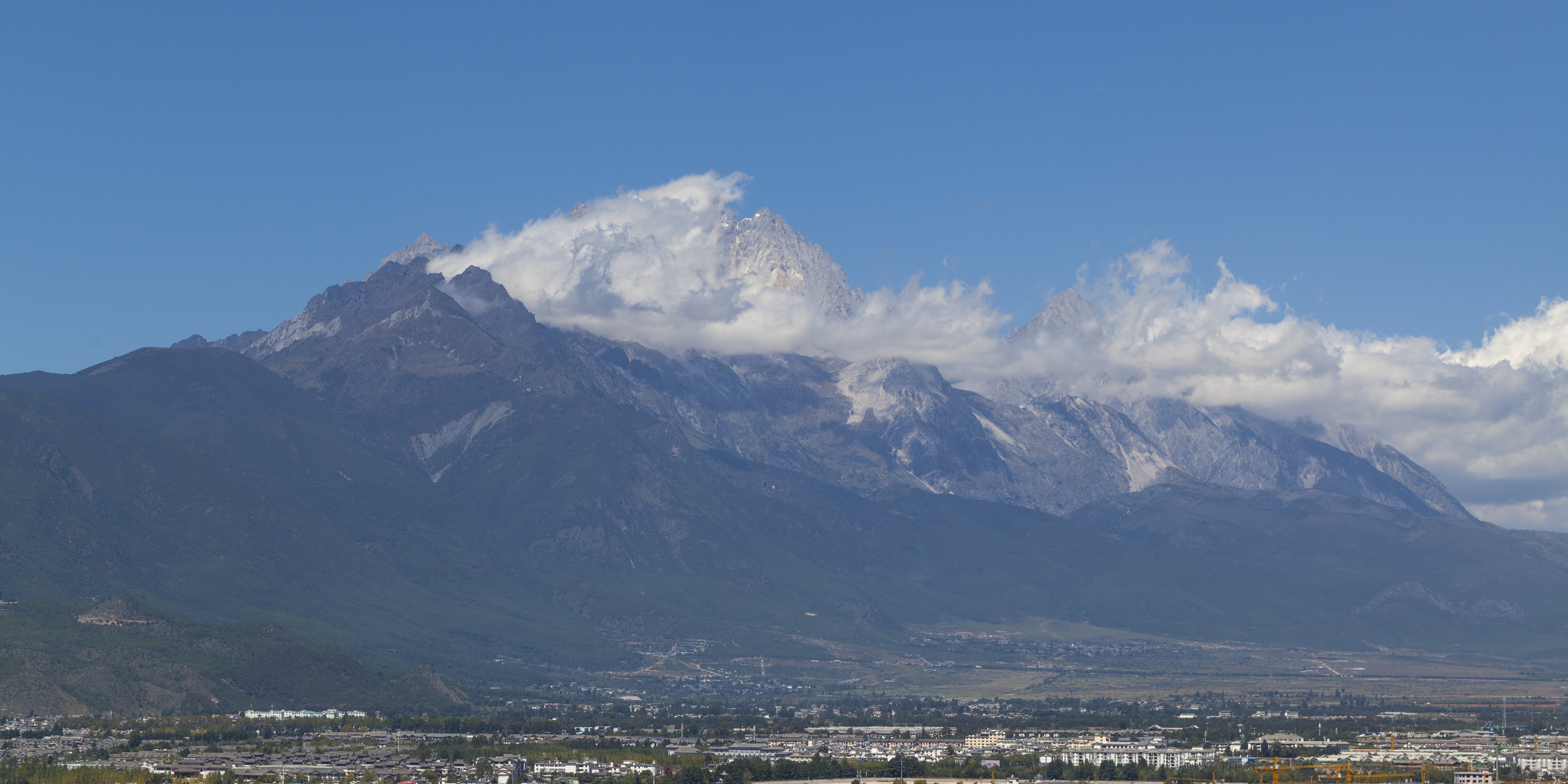
Lijiang, Yunnan province, (only city within Hengduan Shan) dwarfed by Jade Dragon Snow Mountain.

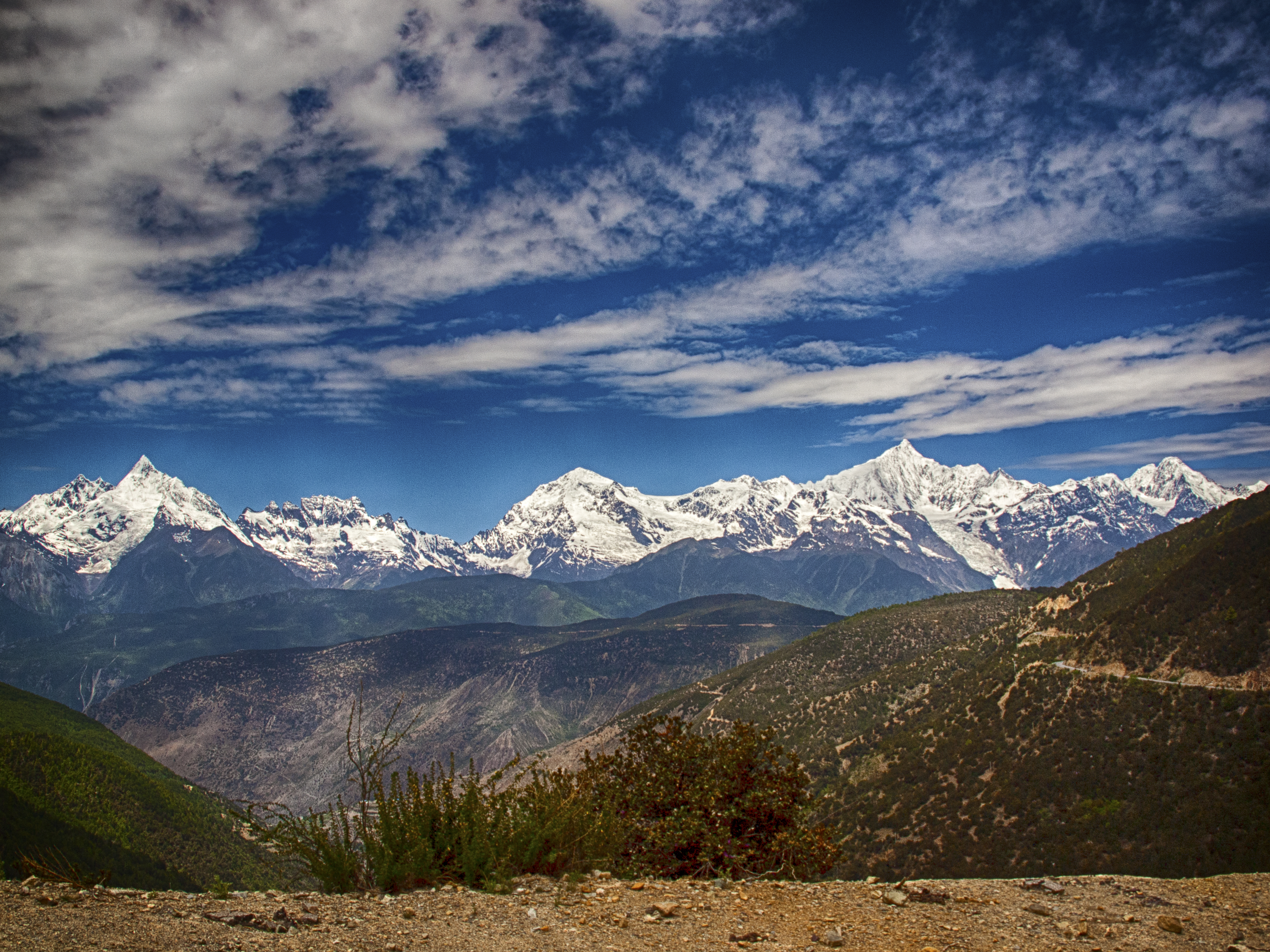
Meili range, border of Dêqên County, Yunnan with Tibet.

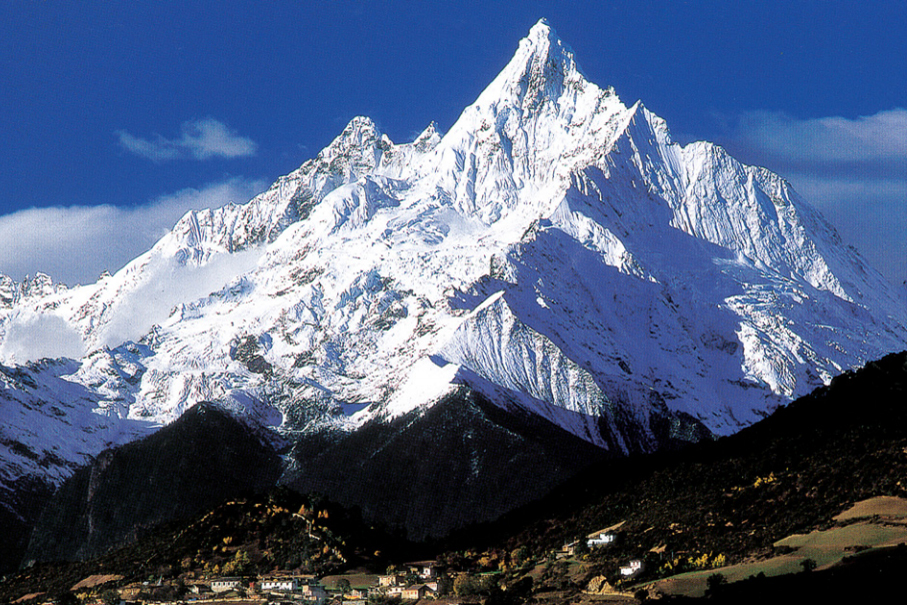
Kawagarbo, highest peak of Meili range, Yunnan/Tibet border.

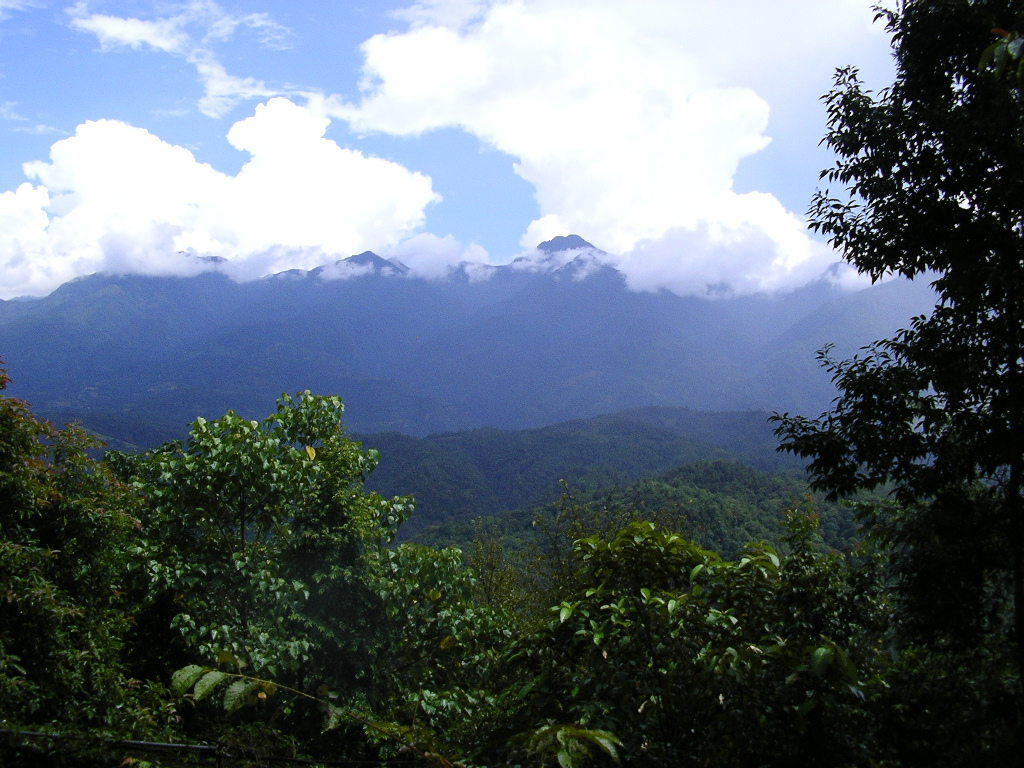
Gaoligong range, border of western Yunnan and Myanmar (Burma).

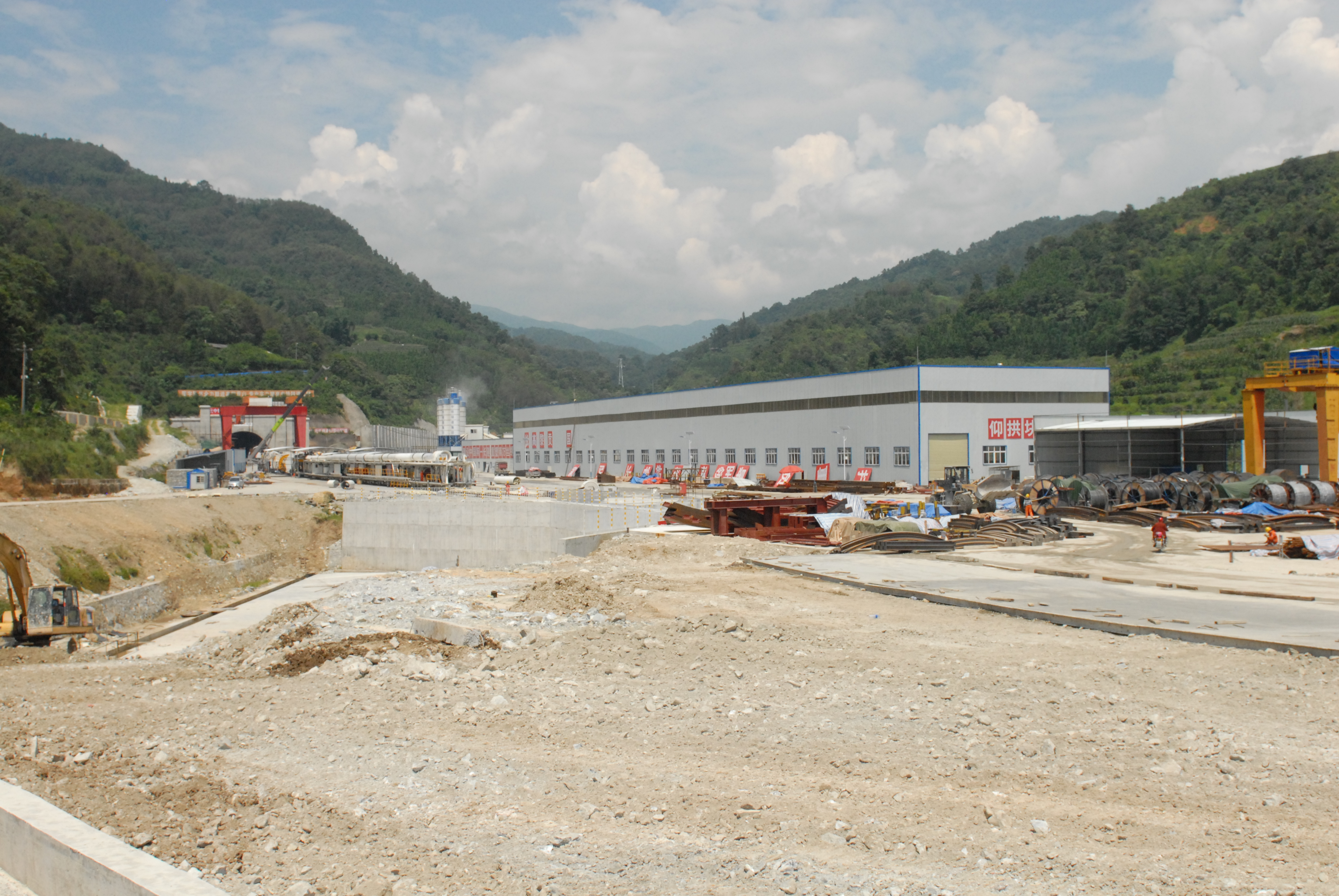
Gaoligong railway tunnel, Yunnan / Myanmar.

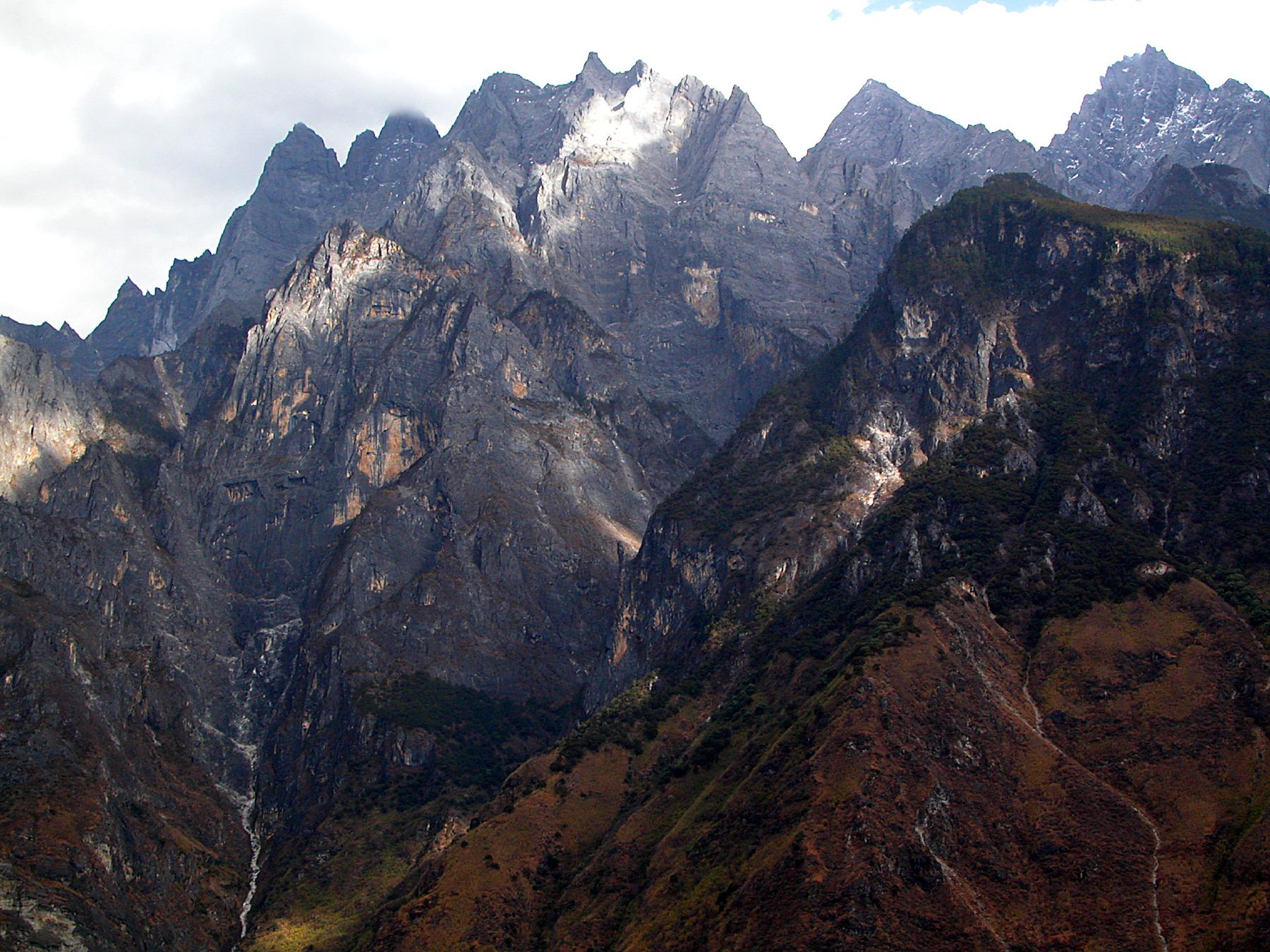
Jagged peaks rising from Yangtze River gorge Yunnan province.

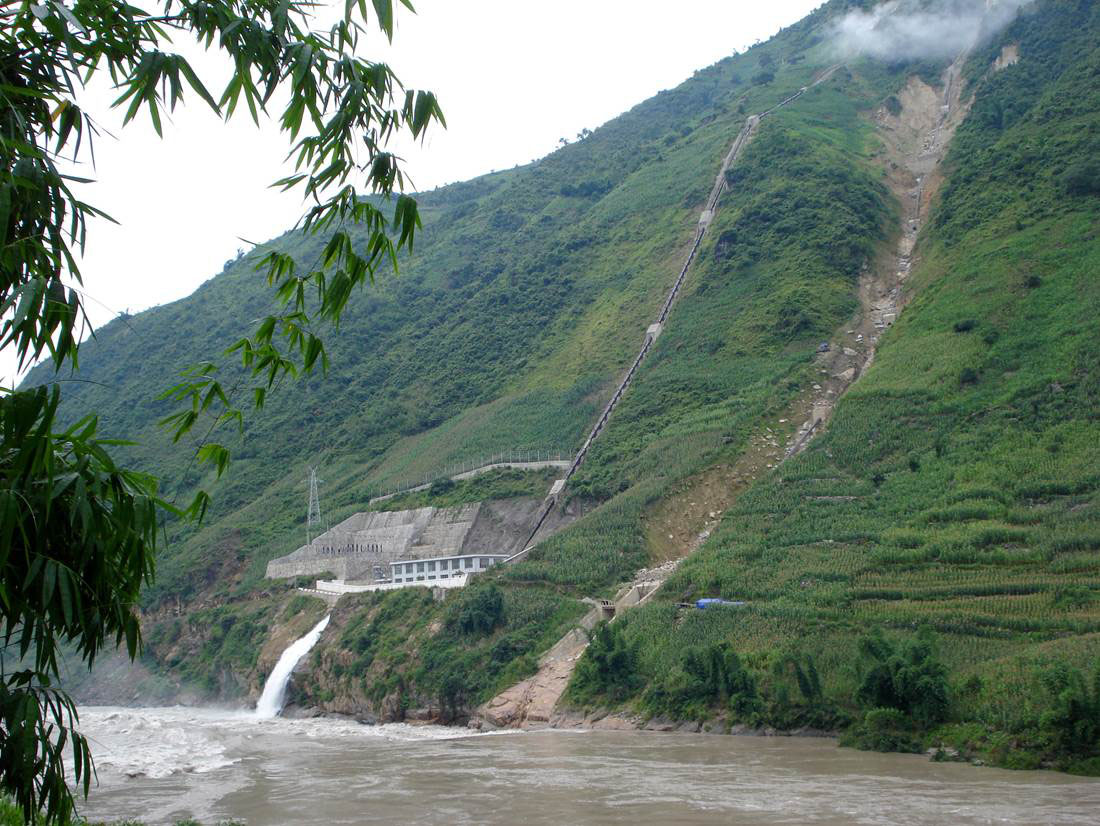
Trial hydroelectric installation, Salween River gorge, Yunnan province.

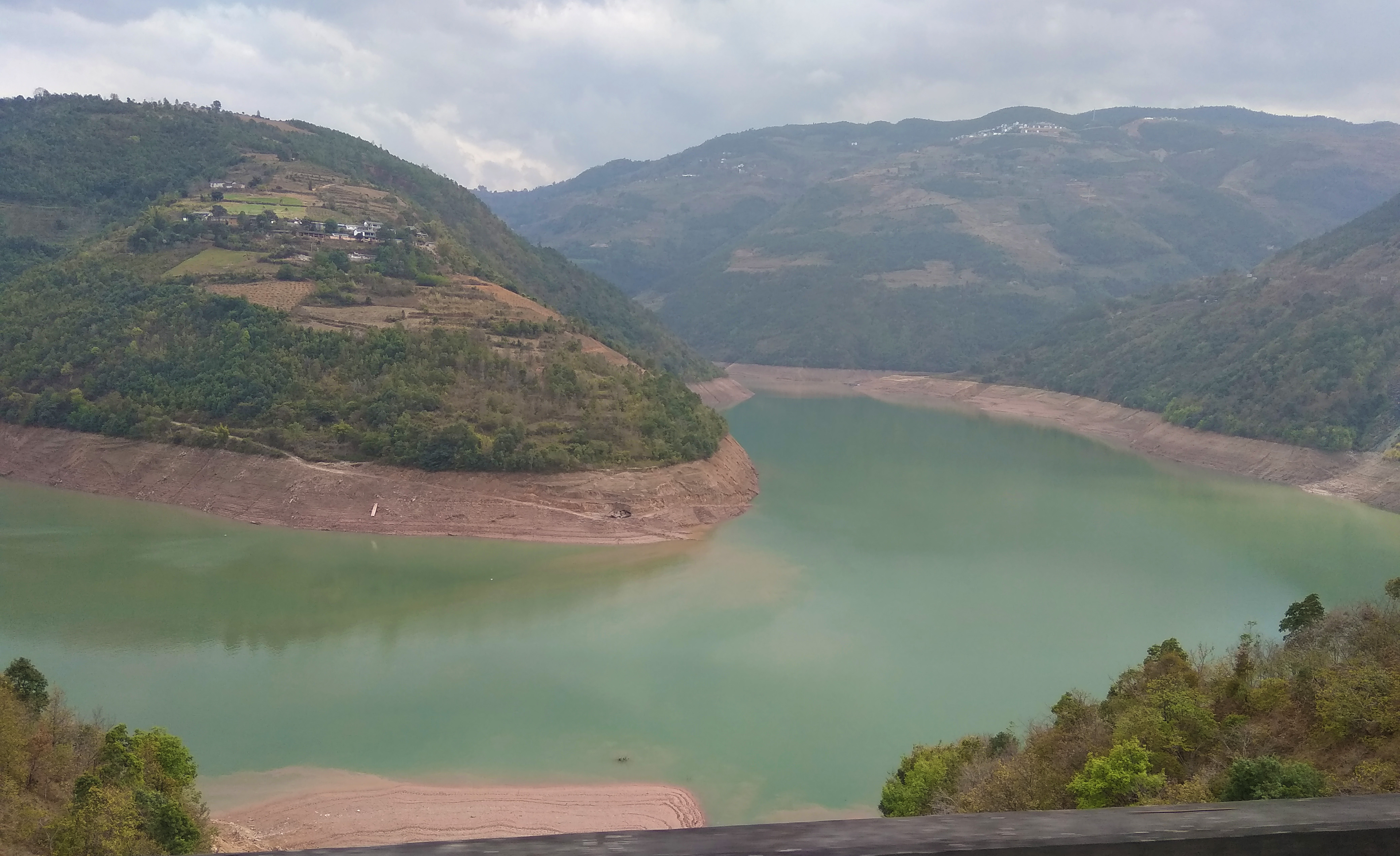
Valley of the Lancang (upper Mekong) River, Baoshan, Yunnan.

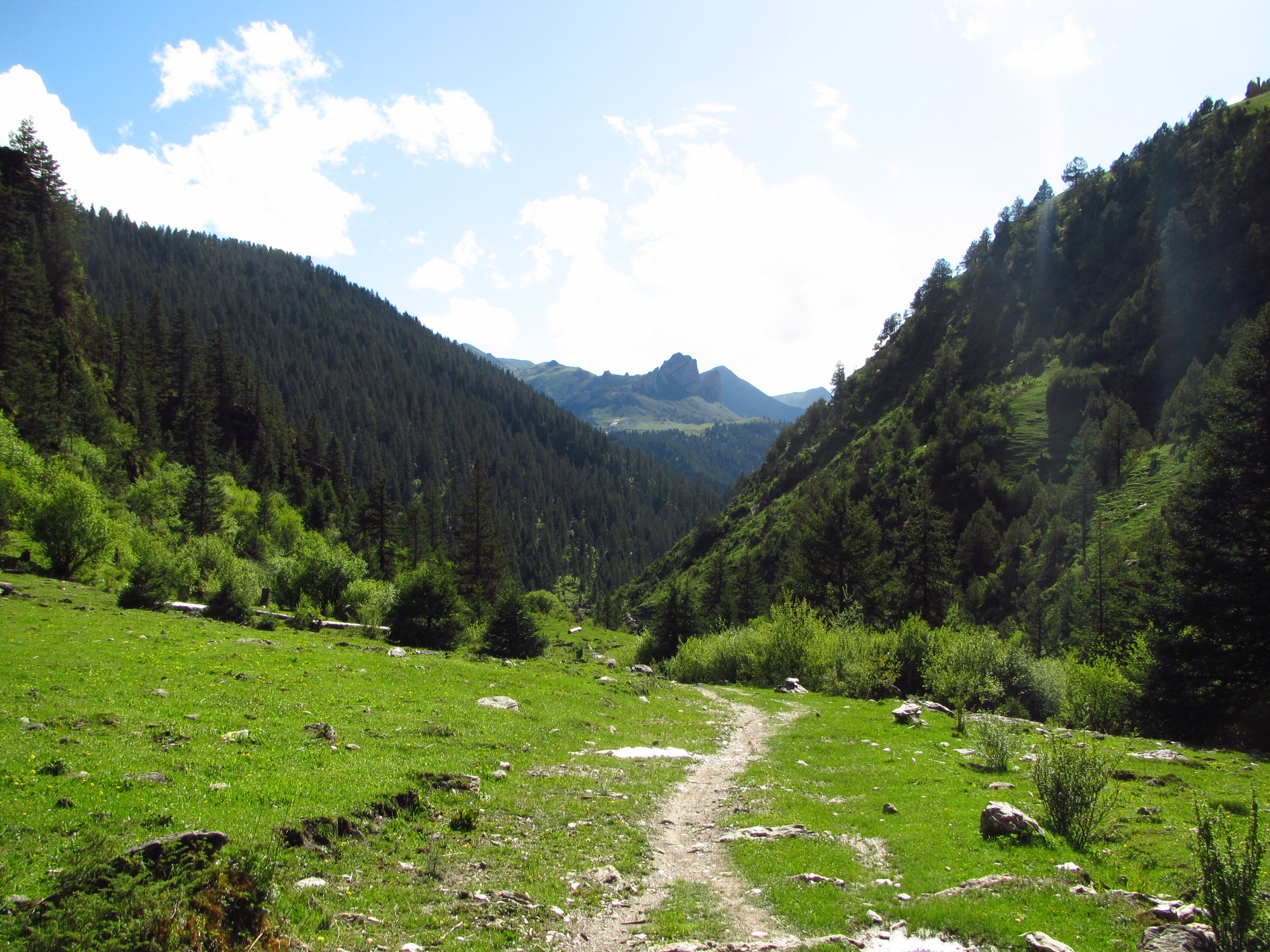
Hengduan conifer forests, Dêgê County, northwest of Sichuan province.

== See also ==
- Global 200
- The Hump
