= Baiya =

Baiya may refer to:

- Baiya Town (柏垭镇), a town in Langzhong, Sichuan, China
- Baiya Township, Dêgê County (白垭乡), a township in Dêgê County, Sichuan, China
- Baiya Township, Jiange County (柏垭乡), a township in Jiange County, Sichuan, China
- "Baiya", a 2012 song by Delphic

== See also ==
- Baiyashi (白牙市), a town in Dong'an County, Hunan, China
