= Babang Township, Sichuan =

Babang 八邦乡
- Township
- Palpung
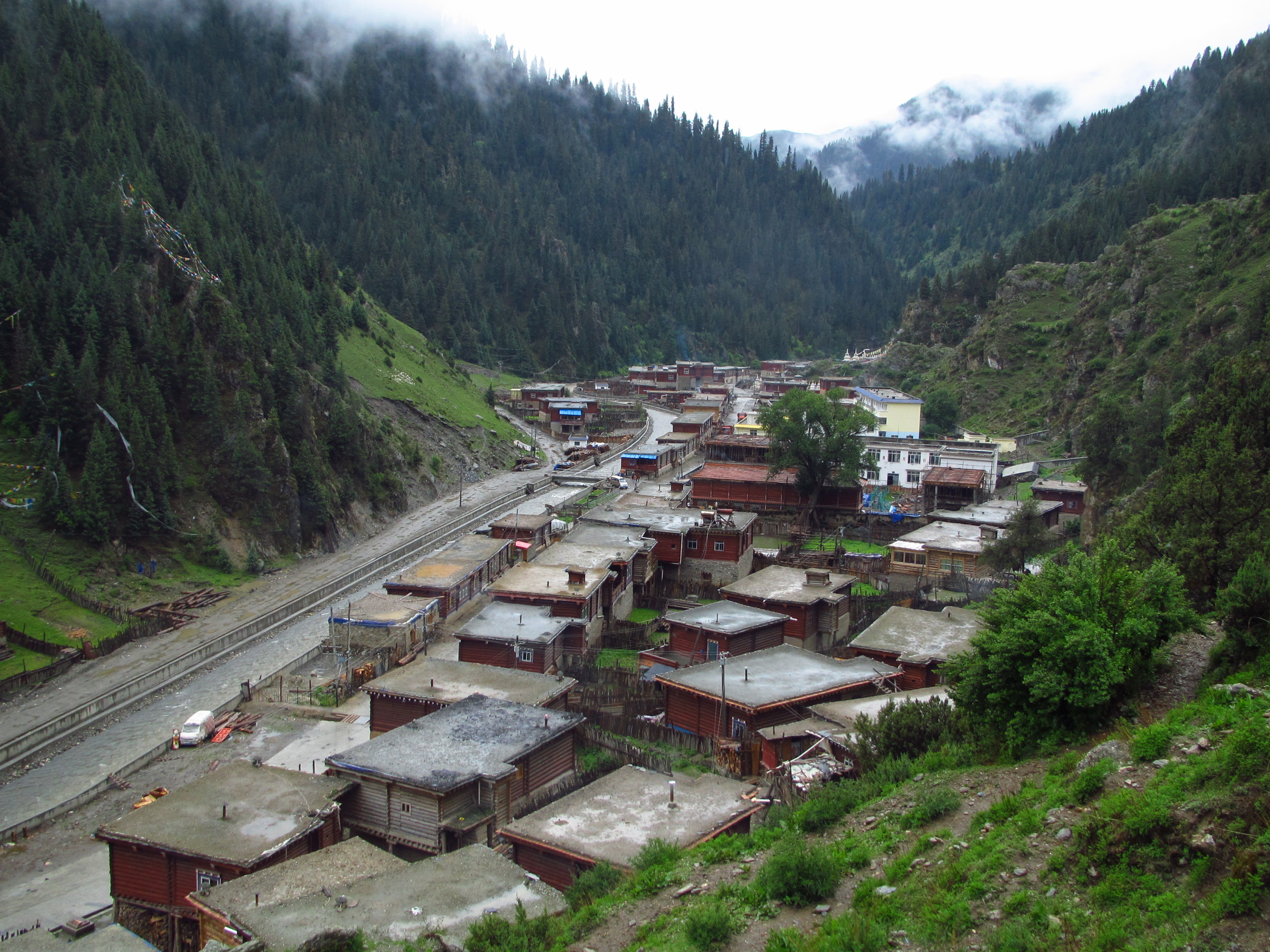
- View of traditional log homes along the Pal Chu (river) in Babang Township

- Location within Sichuan Location within China
- Coordinates: 31°38′36″N 98°47′49″E
- Country: China
- Province: Sichuan
- Prefecture: Garzê Tibetan Autonomous Prefecture
- County: Dêgê County

Area
  - Total: 555.2 km^{2} (214.4 sq mi)
- Elevation: 3,720 m (12,200 ft)

Population (2010)
  - Total: 2,638
- Time zone: UTC+8 (CST)

Babang (Tibetan: Palpung; Chinese: 八邦乡; pinyin: Bābāng Xiāng) is a rural Tibetan township in Dêgê County, Garzê Prefecture, Sichuan, China. The township is primarily concentrated around the Pal Chu (Chinese: 白曲; pinyin: Bái Qū) river in the western reaches of the Chola Mountains on the east side of the Jinsha River. The township contains significant remaining tracts of the Hengduan conifer forests.

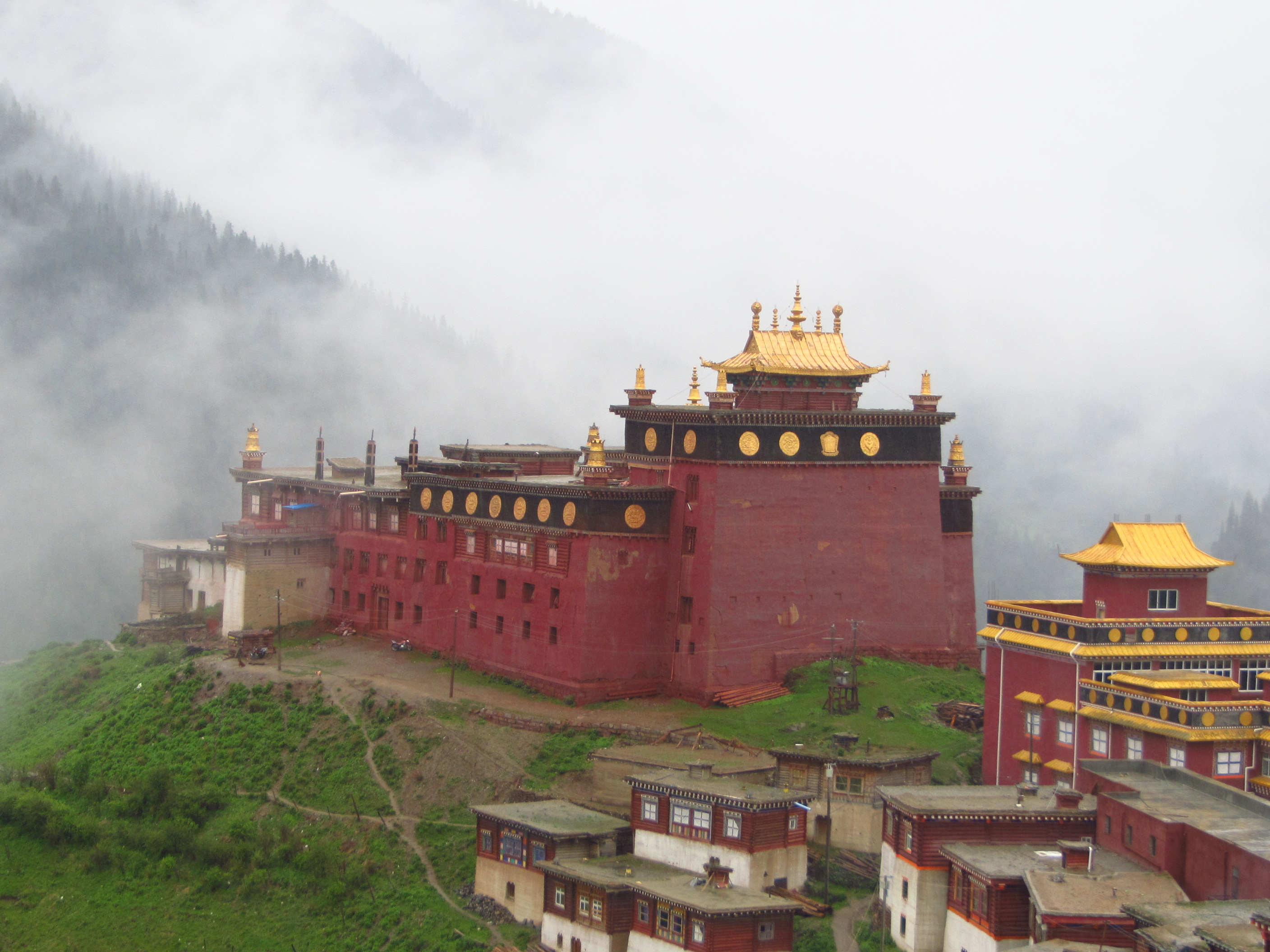
Palpung Monastery

Babang is known for the 18th-century Palpung Monastery located on a ridge approximately 160 m (520 ft) above the centre of the township.

== See also ==
- List of township-level divisions of Sichuan
