= Yihun Lhatso =

- 新路海
- Xinlu Hai (Chinese)
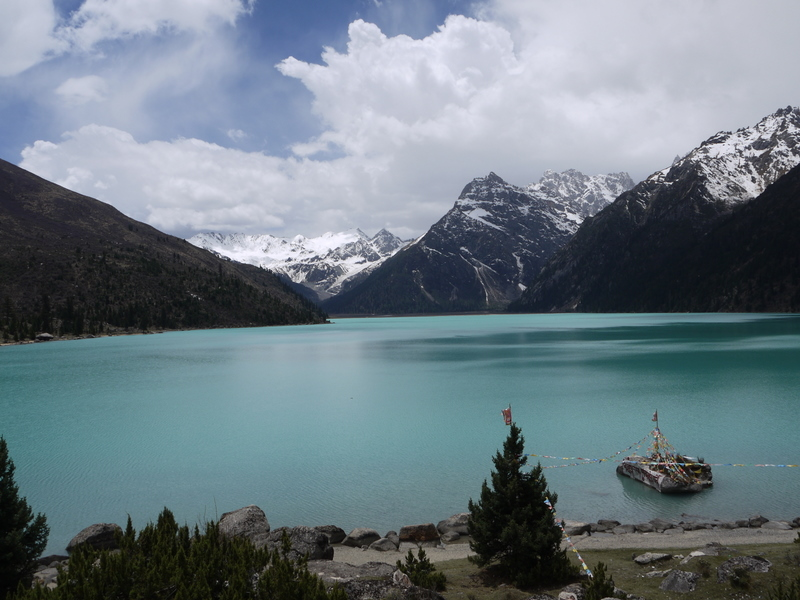
- View from north end of the lake

- Location within Sichuan
- Location: Manigango, Dege County, Garze Prefecture, Sichuan, China
- Coordinates: 31°50′50″N 99°06′48″E
- Type: Glacial lake
- Primary outflows: Tro Chu
- Surface elevation: 4,020 m (13,190 ft)

Yihun Lhatso (Chinese: 新路海; pinyin: Xīnlù HǎiTibetan: ཡིད་ལྟུང་ལྟུ་མཚོ), also transliterated from Tibetan as Yilung Latsho, is a glacial lake in the Tibetan area of western Sichuan Province, China.

== Geography ==
Yihun Lhatso rests in a valley on the north side of the Chola Mountains at the foot of Rongme Ngatra. It is found 10km south of the town of Manigango in Dege County, Garze Prefecture. The lake occupies a u-shaped valley and is contained by the former terminal moraine of a glacier originating from Rongme Ngatra that has now receded to 4,100 m (13,500 ft) above sea level. The lake is drained by the Tro Chu (Chinese: 朝曲; pinyin: Zhāo Qū), a tributary of the Yalong River which eventually joins with the Yangtze. The lake is passed by Highway 317 on its way over Cho La mountain pass.

== Culture ==
As part of the historic Kham region in Tibet, Yihun Lhatso has long been known to the Tibetan people. It is considered a sacred lake in Tibetan Buddhism and a kora route circles the lake. The lake and adjacent streams are known for the hundreds of boulders that have been carved into mani stones. Today, it is a common tourist stop for hiking and the entire Yihun Lhatso area charges an admission fee.
