= Cho La (Sichuan) =

Mountain pass in Sichuan, China

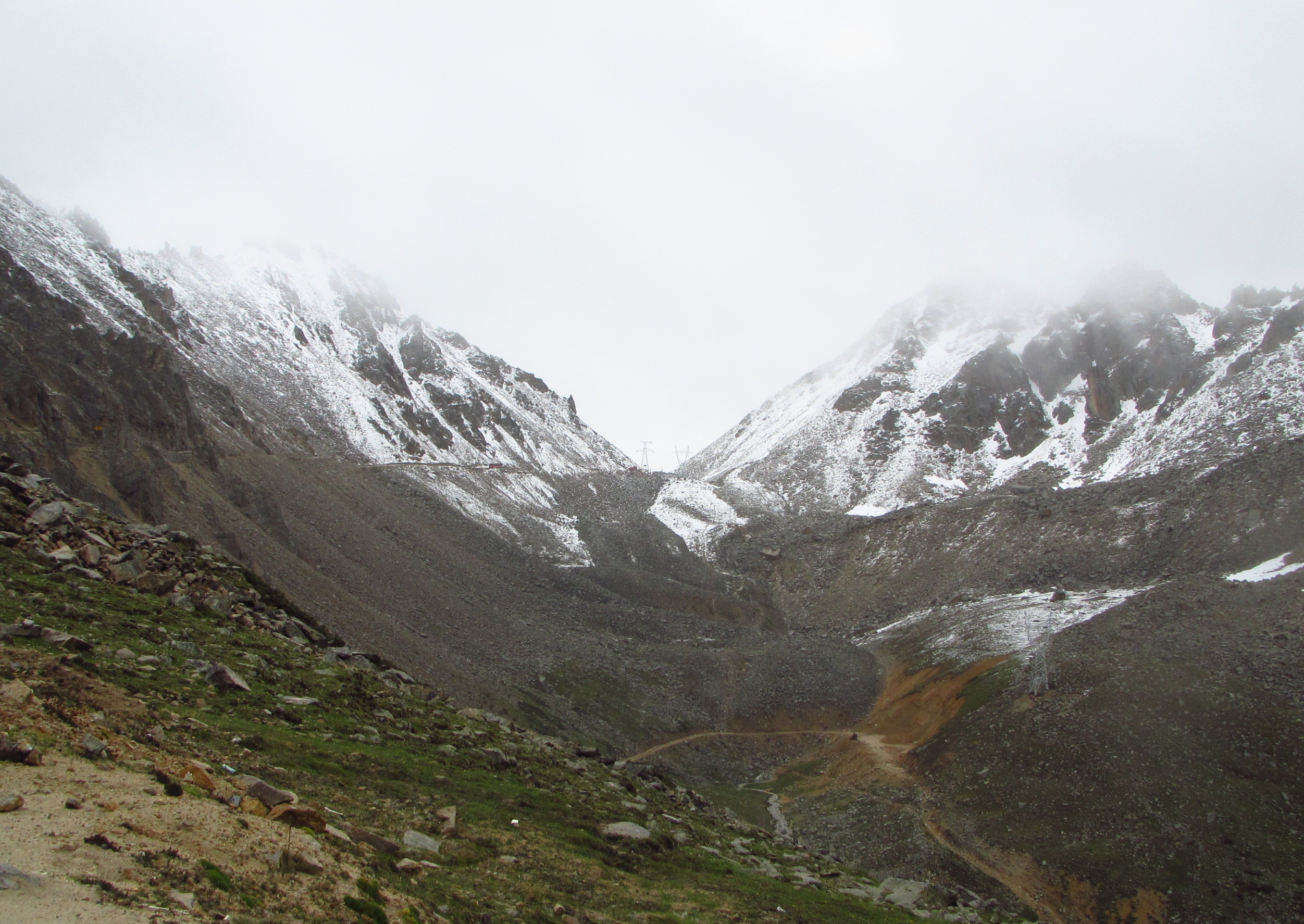
- View from the west

- Location within China
- Elevation: 4,916 metres (16,129 ft)
- Traversed by: G317

Third Approach
- Location: Sichuan near border with Tibet in China
- Range: Chola Mountains
- Coordinates: 31°26′55″N 98°55′26″E

Cho La, also transliterated as Tro La, is a mountain pass across the Chola Mountains in Dege County, Garze Prefecture, Sichuan, China. In Mandarin Chinese, it is known as Qu'er Pass (Chinese: 雀儿山口; pinyin: Què'ér Shānkǒu). The pass reaches a height of 4,916 metres (16,129 ft) and may be snow covered year-round. The pass is an important link between the town of Derge and the rest of Sichuan Province. Historically, it was part of a trade route between Tibet and China through the Kingdom of Derge in Kham. The western flank of the pass is drained by the Zhil Chu (Chinese: 色曲; pinyin: Sè Qū) and the eastern flank is drained by the Tro Chu (Chinese: 朝曲; pinyin: Zhāo Qū). Yihun Lhatso, a glacial-fed lake, is located to the east of the pass.

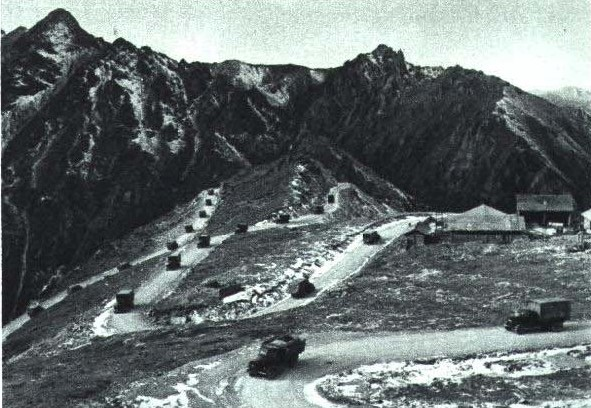
Photo of the road leading to Cho La from 1965

A tunnel constructed under the Chola Mountains now bypasses the mountain pass and is the world's highest vehicular tunnel. Construction of the tunnel was completed in 2016.
