= Rongme Ngatra =

Mountain in Dêgê County, Sichuan, China

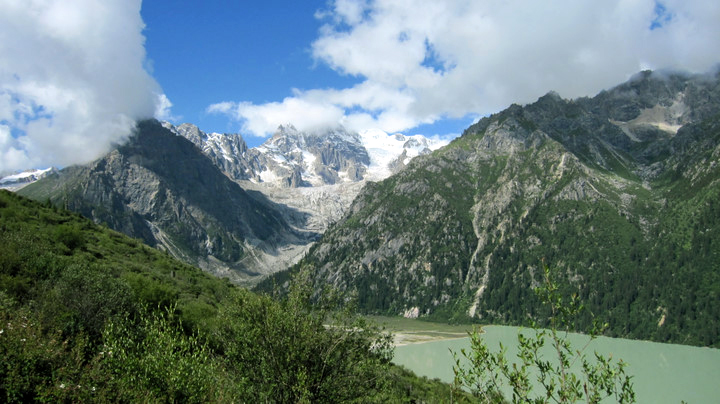
- Rongme Ngatra above Yihun Lhatso

Highest point
- Elevation: 6,168 m (20,236 ft)
- Prominence: 1,703 m (5,587 ft)
- Coordinates: 31°47′09″N 99°04′22″E

Geography
- Location within Sichuan Location within China
- Location: Dege County, Garze Prefecture, Sichuan, China
- Parent range: Chola Mountains

Climbing
- First ascent: 1988

Rongme Ngatra is the highest peak of the Chola Mountains in the Kham region of western Sichuan, China. The peak's name in Mandarin Chinese is Que Er Shan (Chinese: 雀儿山; pinyin: Què'ér Shān) also the same name as the entire range, which has led to some translations of the mountain peak to Chola Mountain. At 6,168 metres (20,236 ft), the mountain is the highest peak in the Chola Mountains, as well as the second highest in the greater Shaluli Mountains after Ge'nyen. The mountain peak is flanked by glaciers to the north and east. The north glacier terminates at 4,100 metres (13,500 ft) above sea level, just above the nearby lake Yihun Lhatso. Rongme Ngatra can be accessed from the town of Manigango in Dege County, Garze Prefecture.

== See also ==
- List of ultras of Tibet, East Asia and neighbouring areas
