= Axus (disambiguation) =

Axus may refer to:

- Axos or Axus, Oaxus or Oaxos, Waxus or Waxos, a city and polis (city-state) of ancient Crete
- Benjamin Axus (born 1994), French judoka

== See also ==
- Axu Town, a town in the Garzê Tibetan Autonomous Prefecture of Sichuan, China
- Axis (disambiguation)
