= Axu =

Axu or AXU may refer to:

- Akseli Kokkonen, also known as Axu Kokkonen (born 1984), Norwegian ski jumper
- Axu Town, a town in the Garzê Tibetan Autonomous Prefecture of Sichuan, China
- AXU, IATA sign for Axum Airport also known as Emperor Yohannes IV Airport, an airport serving Axum, a city in the northern Tigray Region of Ethiopia
