= Chola Mountains =

Mountain range in Sichuan Province, China

Chola Mountainsཁྲོ་ལ་རི་བོ།
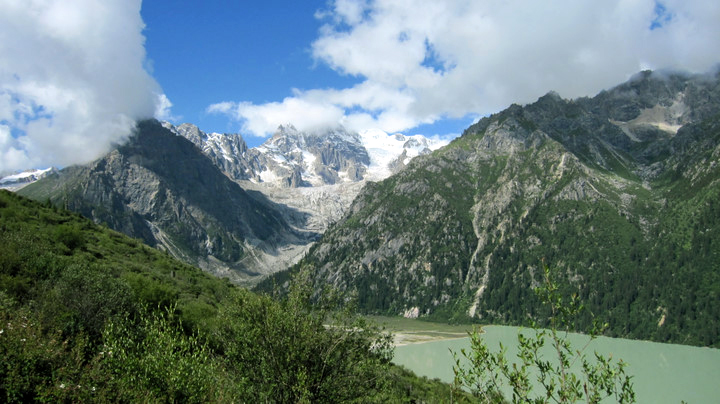
- Rongme Ngatra above Yihun Lhatso

Highest point
- Peak: Rongme Ngatra
- Elevation: 6,168 m (20,236 ft)
- Coordinates: 31°47′09″N 99°04′22″E

Naming
- Native name: 雀儿山; Què'ér Shān

Geography
- Country: China
- Prefecture / Province: Garze, Sichuan
- Parent range: Shaluli Mountains

The Chola Mountains, also romanized as the Trola Mountains, are a northern subrange of the Shaluli Mountains in western Sichuan Province, China. The mountains were once at the centre of the Kingdom of Derge and many remnant Tibetan Buddhist monasteries can be found in the mountain range's valleys.

== Etymology ==
The Chinese transliteration of the Chola Mountains is Que Er Shan (simplified Chinese: 雀儿山; traditional Chinese: 雀兒山; pinyin: Què'ér Shān). The Chola Mountains are named after the primary pass crossing the range, Cho La or Tro La. Cho La in Tibetan means Lake Pass. However, others claim, Chola is just another name for snow mountain, given by local Tibetans. Due to the Chinese transliteration of the mountains into Què'ér and its common usage on official maps, the mountain range is sometimes mistakenly translated into "Sparrow Mountains" or "Bird Mountains".

== Geology ==
Located in the eastern Tibetan Plateau, the Chola Mountains are a result of uplift caused during the Indian subcontinent's collision with the Eurasian Plate. The Chola Mountains lie on the northeastern edge of a semi-independent tectonic block as part of the greater Eurasian Plate. The mountains range's abrupt northeastern edge is formed by the Ganzi segment of the Xianshuihe Fault where two blocks of the tectonic plate are experiencing strike-slip movement under stress.

== Geography ==
The Chola Mountains run in a northwest to southeast direction with the ridgeline nearest to the range's northeastern edge. The highest peak, Rongme Ngatra, is 6,168 metres (20,236 ft) above sea level. Other significant peaks include Dophu Ngatra (6,119m) and Zhiltrön (5,988m). All three peaks have glaciers on their northern faces and the entire range possesses almost twelve glaciers in total with some descending as low as 4,100 metres (13,500 ft). The Chola Mountains form part of the drainage divide between the Upper Yangtze (Jinsha) and Yalong River watersheds. Major tributaries to the southwest include the Zhil Chu (Chinese: 色曲; pinyin: Sè Qū), Pal Chu (Chinese: 白曲; pinyin: Bái Qū), and Me Chu (Chinese: 麦曲; pinyin: Mài Qū), while the northeastern flanks possess the Tro Chu (Chinese: 朝曲; pinyin: Zhāo Qū). Numerous glacial-fed lakes have formed along the northeastern edge of the Chola Mountains, with Yihun Lhatso in the Tro Chu valley being the most notable.

On the southwestern slopes and at lower elevations, the Chola Mountains are covered by sections of the Hengduan Mountains subalpine conifer forests. To the north and east, the Tibetan Plateau consists of montane grasslands and shrublands including the Southeast Tibet shrub and meadows ecoregion.

== Human activity ==
The Chola Mountain's southwestern hills and valleys were historically at the heartland of the Derge Kingdom in the Kham region of Tibet. The kingdom's capital was Derge, located in the Zhil Chu valley of the Chola foothills. Cho La (Cho Pass) was an important link across the mountains, connecting Derge and central Tibet with the Garze and Sichuan basin regions. The Chola foothills possessed hundreds of monasteries until Chinese annexation in the 20th century. Many of these monasteries were associated with fringe branches of Tibetan Buddhism including Nyingma, Sakya, Kagyu, and the Rimé movement. Today, major monasteries in the Chola Mountains' foothills and valleys include the Palpung Monastery, Gongchen Monastery, Dzongsar Monastery, and Dzogchen Monastery.

Administratively, today the Chola Mountains are primarily within Dege County, Garze Prefecture, in Sichuan. A small portion of the mountains in the south pass into neighbouring Baiyu County. Derge remains as the primary urban centre in the mountain range, although the Pal Chu and Me Chu valleys also contain concentrations of villages. National Highway G-317, also known as the Northern Sichuan-Tibet Highway, crosses the range at 4,916 metres (16,129 ft) above sea level via Cho La between Manigango and Derge. In 2016, the Chinese government completed construction of a new 7 km (4.3 mi) long tunnel bypassing the mountain pass and is the highest vehicular tunnel in the world.
