= Hengduan Mountains subalpine conifer forests =

Ecoregion in the Hengduan Mountains

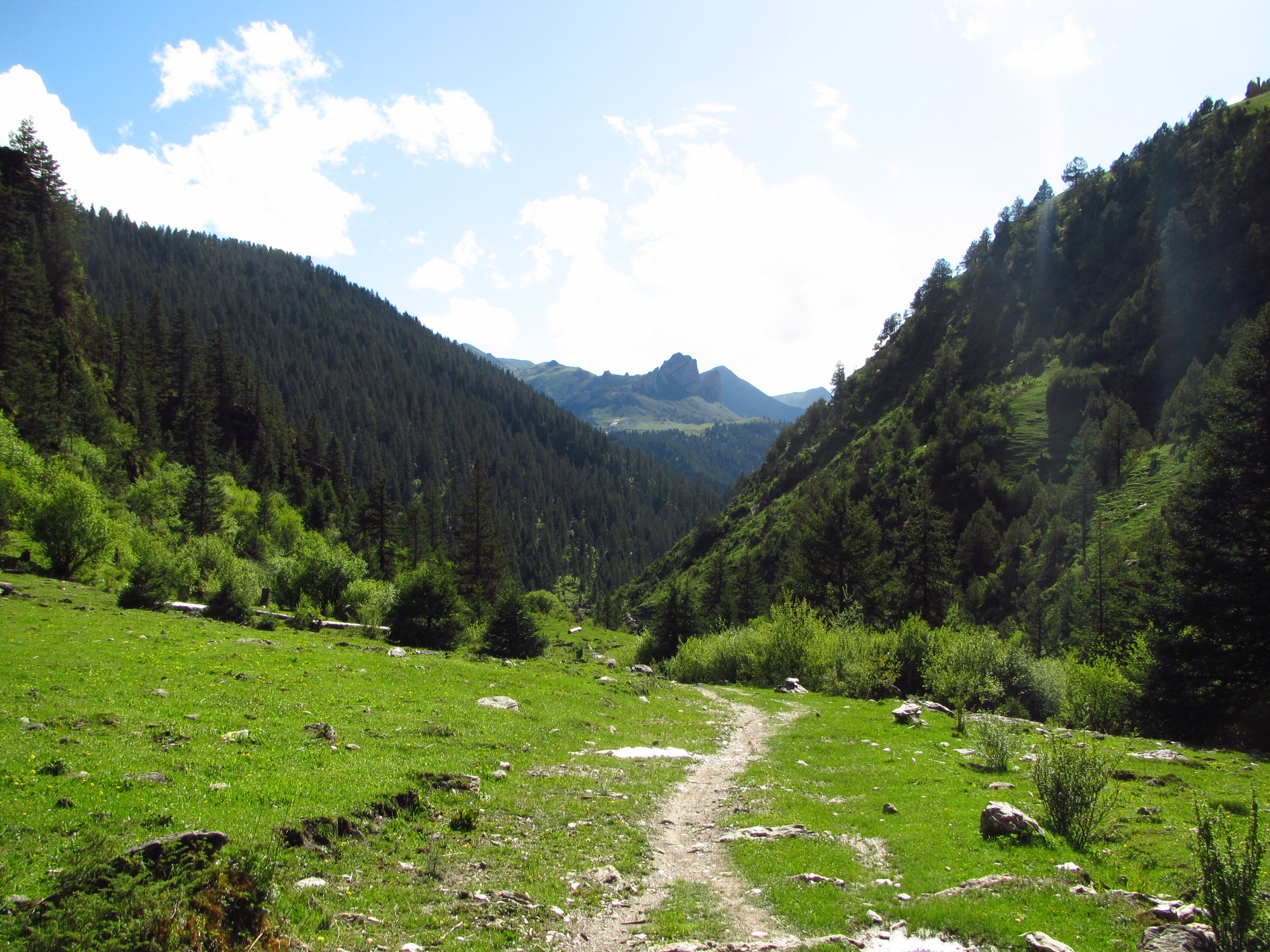
- Conifer forests at the treeline in the Chola Mountain foothills in Dêgê County

- Location of ecoregion

Ecology
- Realm: Palearctic
- Biome: Temperate coniferous forests

Geography
- Country: China

The Hengduan Mountains subalpine conifer forests are a temperate forest in the Hengduan Mountains of southwestern China. The forests extend within the Jinsha (upper Yangtze) and Yalong River valleys from approximately 32°N to 27°N. In addition, a portion of the Anning River valley and Mianmian Mountains near Lugu Lake support the subalpine conifer forests. This region covers northern Yunnan Province, western Sichuan Province, and the extreme eastern edge of the Tibet Autonomous Region.

The Hengduan Mountains subalpine conifer forests are one zone in a range of montane ecosystems that transition between tropical and temperate ecoregions along the southeastern fringe of the Tibetan Plateau. The Hengduan forests reach elevations higher than 4,000 m (13,000 ft) and extend to the treeline, beyond which are montane grasslands and shrublands classified as the Southeast Tibet shrub and meadows. The Hengduan conifer forests are separated into two arms by the Shaluli Mountains.

Environmental groups have recognized this ecoregion as being threatened by "a growing human population and the resulting demand for non-timber forests and wildlife products for medicinal and other uses".
