= Manigango =

Manigango 马尼干戈
- Township
- Location within Sichuan
- Coordinates: 31°55′47″N 99°12′23″E
- Country: China
- Province: Sichuan
- Prefecture: Garzê
- County: Dêgê

Population (2010)
  - Total: 2,988

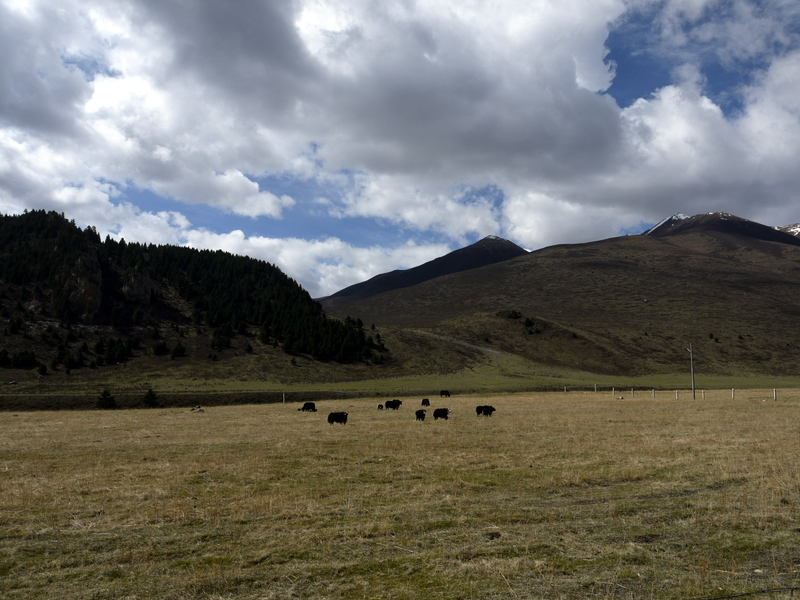
Manigango countryside

Manigango (Chinese: 马尼干戈; pinyin: Mǎnígāngē) is a small township in Dege County, Garze Prefecture, Sichuan, China. The town is located on the Tro Chu (Chinese: 朝曲; pinyin: Zhāo Qū) river on the east side of the Chola Mountains. The area is part of the historical region of Kham in Tibet. Today, Manigango is mainly known for Yihun Lhatso, a glacial lake 10km south of the town. The town is connected via China National Highway 317 with Derge to the west and Ganzi to the east.
