= Enan Township, Sichuan =

Enan Township 俄南乡
- Township
- Enanxiang
- Location in Sichuan
- Coordinates: 32°14′59″N 98°22′48″E
- Country: People's Republic of China
- Province: Sichuan
- Autonomous prefecture: Garzê Tibetan Autonomous Prefecture
- County: Dêgê County

Area
  - Total: 293.7 km^{2} (113.4 sq mi)

Population (2010)
  - Total: 1,456
  - Density: 4.957/km^{2} (12.84/sq mi)
- Time zone: UTC+8 (China Standard)

Enan (Chinese: 俄南乡) is a township in Dêgê County, Garzê Tibetan Autonomous Prefecture, Sichuan, China. In 2010, Enan Township had a total population of 1,456: 694 males and 762 females: 385 aged under 14, 981 aged between 15 and 65, and 90 aged over 65.
