= Baiya Township, Jiange County =

Baiya Township 柏垭乡
- Township
- Location within Sichuan
- Coordinates: 31.9815°N 105.6023°E
- Country: China
- Province: Sichuan
- Prefecture-level city: Guangyuan
- County: Jiange County
- Merged into Muma: May 12, 2020

Area
  - Total: 35.77 km^{2} (13.81 sq mi)

Population (2018)
  - Total: 6,660
  - Density: 186/km^{2} (482/sq mi)

Baiya Township (simplified Chinese: 柏垭乡; traditional Chinese: 柏埡鄉; pinyin: Bǎiyā Xiāng) was a former township in Jiange County, Guangyuan, Sichuan, China. The township spanned an area of 35.77 square kilometres (13.81 mi^{2}), and had a hukou population of 6,660 in 2018.

== History ==
On May 12, 2020, the Sichuan provincial government announced that Baiya Township would be abolished, and merged into the town of Muma.

== Administrative divisions ==
In 2019, Baiya Township administered the following eight administrative villages:

- Yunding Village (Chinese: 云顶村)
- Liuqing Village (Chinese: 柳青村)
- Xinmiao Village (Chinese: 新庙村)
- Jingquan Village (Chinese: 井泉村)
- Hongliang Village (Chinese: 红梁村)
- Gongtong Village (Chinese: 共同村)
- Qingping Village (Chinese: 青坪村)
- Chengshan Village (Chinese: 程山村)

== Demographics ==
As of 2018, Baiya Township had a population of 6,660, significantly higher than the 4,341 recorded in the 2010 Chinese Census. The latter figure represents a sizeable decline from the population of 6,967 recorded in the 2000 Chinese Census. This decline is likely due to, in part, the effects of the 2008 Sichuan Earthquake, which seriously affected Jiange County, as well as rural flight common throughout China.

== See also ==
- List of township-level divisions of Sichuan
