= Baiya Township, Dêgê County =

Baiya
- Township

Tibetan transcription(s)

Chinese transcription(s)
  - Traditional: 白埡
  - Simplified: 白垭
  - Pinyin: Báiyā
- Location in Sichuan
- Coordinates: 31.53604°N 98.6977°E
- Country: China
- Province: Sichuan
- Prefecture: Garzê Tibetan Autonomous Prefecture
- County: Dêgê County

Area
  - Total: 201.0 km^{2} (77.6 sq mi)

Population (2010)
  - Total: 1,744
  - Density: 8.677/km^{2} (22.47/sq mi)
- Time zone: UTC+8 (CST)

Baiya Township (白垭乡) is a township in Dêgê County, Garzê Tibetan Autonomous Prefecture, Sichuan, China. Baiya Township contains seven villages: Lengcha, Linxue, Achi, Nizu, Rihuo, Wose, and Cha'an.

== See also ==
- List of township-level divisions of Sichuan
