= Taniantaweng Mountains =

Mountain range in the Tibet Autonomous Region of China

Taniantaweng Shan

Highest point
- Elevation: 4,046 m (13,274 ft)
- Coordinates: 31°20′00″N 98°00′00″E

Geography
- Country: China
- Region(s): Tibet, Qinghai

Taniantaweng Shan is a mountain range in the Tibet Autonomous Region of China, near the border with Qinghai. Its elevation is 4,046 m (13,274 ft). It lies approximately 690 km (430 mi) from Lhasa and approximately 1,914 km (1,189 mi) from Beijing.
