= Dzongsar Monastery =

Buddhist monastery in Sichuan, China

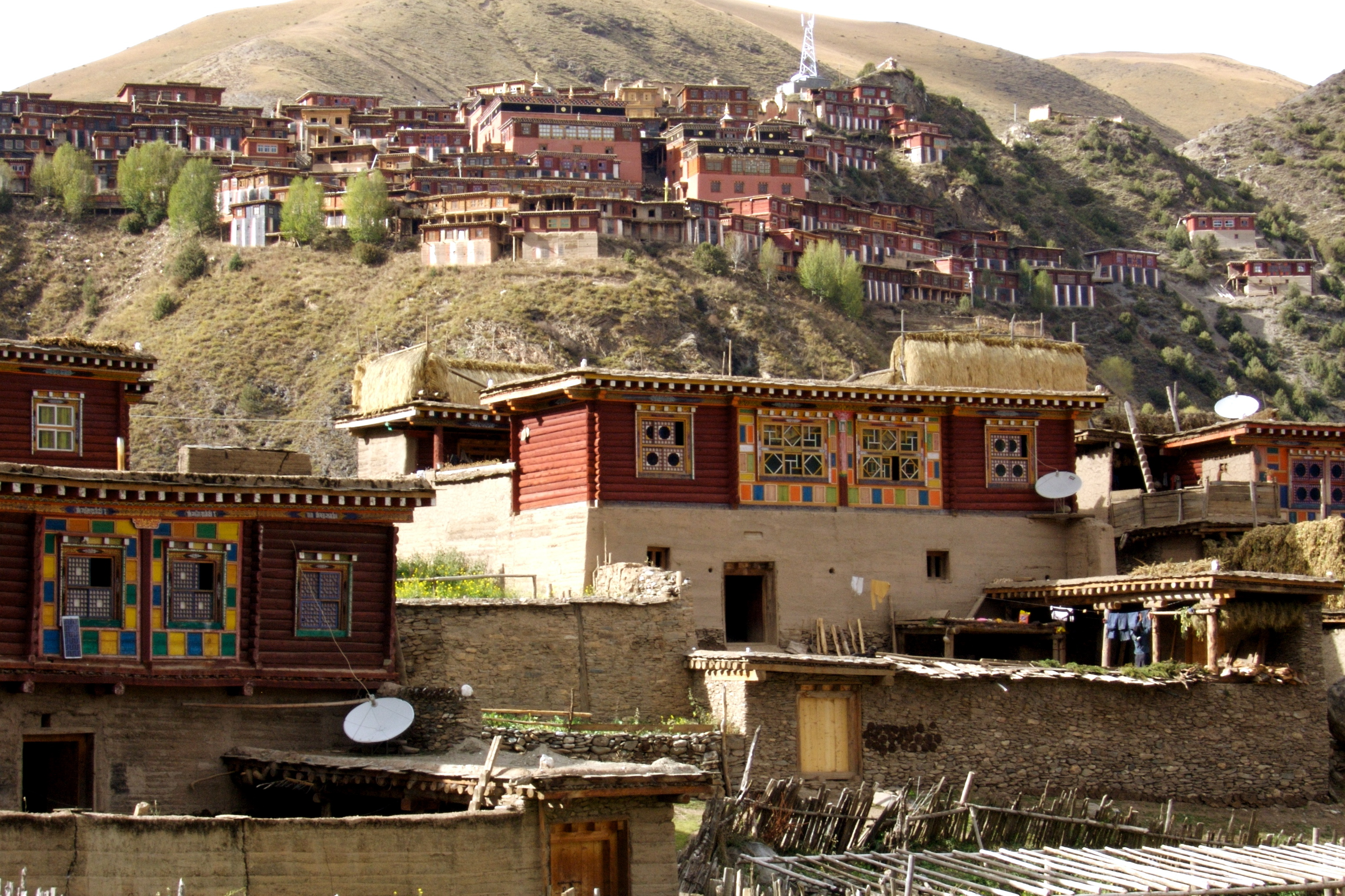
- Dzongsar Monastery

- Location within Sichuan

Religion
- Affiliation: Tibetan Buddhism
- Sect: Sakya and Rimé
- Leadership: Dzongsar Jamyang Khyentse Rinpoche

Location
- Location: Mehnshek, Dêgê County, Garzê Tibetan Autonomous Prefecture, Sichuan, China
- Country: China
- Interactive map of Dzongsar Monastery
- Coordinates: 31°38′35″N 98°57′46″E

Architecture
- Completed: 746, refounded 1275

Dzongsar Monastery (Tibetan: རྫོང་གསར་དགོན།, Wylie: rdzong gsar dgon) is a Buddhist monastery in Dêgê County in the Garzê Tibetan Autonomous Prefecture of Sichuan, China, southeast of the town of Derge and east of Palpung Monastery. Historically it lay in the Kham region of Tibet. It was founded in 746, destroyed in 1958, and rebuilt in 1983.

The monastery belongs to the Sakya school of Tibetan Buddhism and was the main seat of Jamyang Khyentse Wangpo and Jamyang Khyentse Chökyi Lodrö. However it is noted for its eclecticism of the Rimé movement and its openness to most of the teaching sects of Tibetan Buddhism.

== History ==
=== Old monastery ===
Dzongsar Gonpa was founded in 746 AD by a Bönpo Lama. Originally there was just a very small temple at this site, called Jowo-Lha-Chig-Kar-Chig and the Bönpo shrine remained until 1958. The original Bönpo Gonpa was transformed into a Nyingma and a Kadampa temple at some stage. In 1275 it was founded as a Sakya monastery by Drogön Chögyal Phagpa on his return from China.

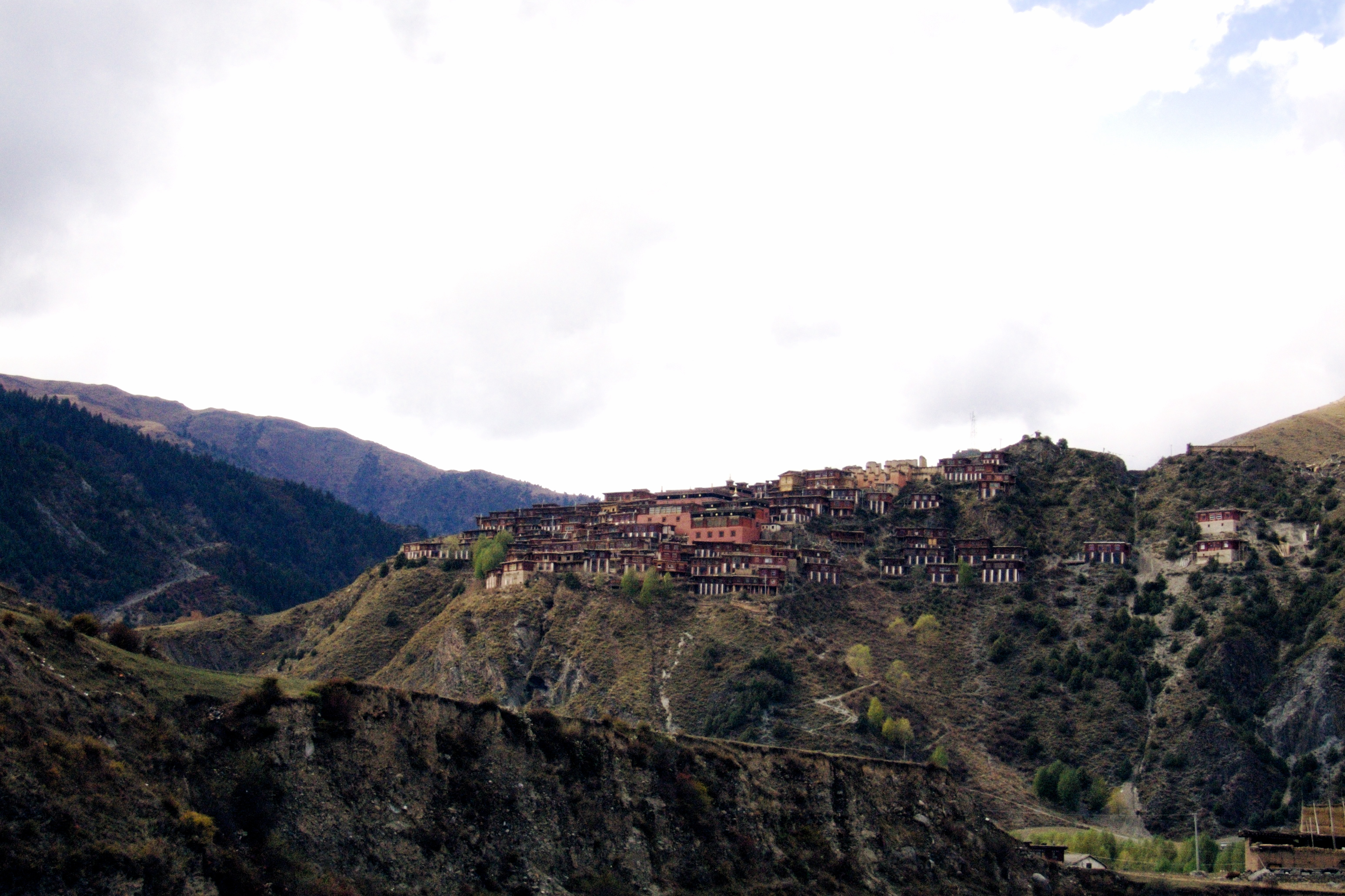
The hilltop hosting the monastery complex

Before 1958, Dzongsar had between 300 and 500 permanent resident monks, but frequently had many more people who camped around the monastery in tents to meet with the lamas. All the temples were destroyed in 1958, but rebuilding began in 1983 under the guidance of Dr. Lodrö Puntsok.

The monastery had twenty three temples, large and small, and many important sacred rooms. It contained hermitages such as Khamshe Shekdra, Karmo Taktsang retreat centre, Gargu Shangchub Rihtrek retreat centre, Zamnang Pema Shelpuk, Zingkhok Trawo retreat centre, Tsedrak Drulphuk, Gyalgen Chungtak, Munong Dorjee Drakal, Tsa-chu-juk Chenresig Lhakang, Honda Thongthong Gyalpo, and others. Dzongsar had a unique collection of Rimé scriptures and teachings, gathered by the proponents of the Rime movement, Jamgon Kongtrul, Chogyur Lingpa and Khyentse Wangpo. Although Dzongsar was a Sakya monastery by principle it was known to be flexible in its teachings and made it possible to study eight sects of Buddhism.

=== New monastery ===
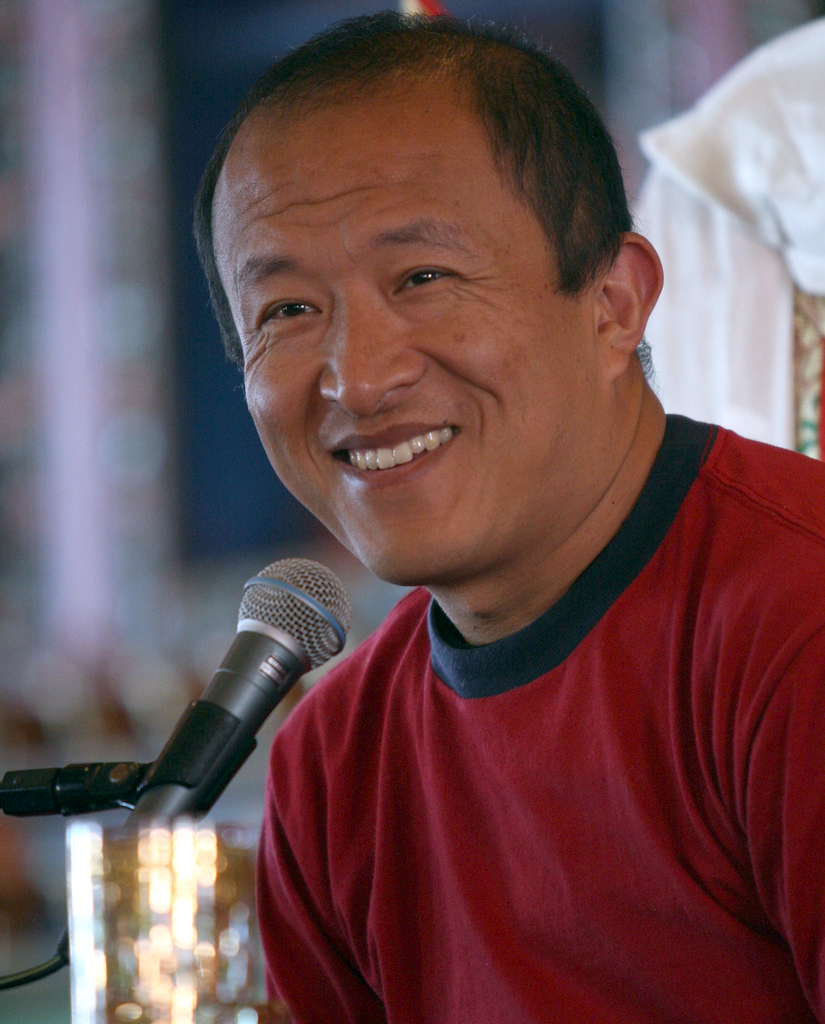
The living Khyentse Rinpoche, Dzongsar Jamyang Khyentse Rinpoche

New building next to the Shedra, April 2010.

In 1983 the temples and institutions of the monastery were rebuilt but not in its full glory. It now only has six large and small temples. However, 180 monk's residences have been rebuilt and today the main temples cover 48,200 square meters. Today there are more than 200 monks residing at Dzongsar. Dzongsar also runs a school teaching Tibetan traditions, and has an enrollment of about 60 children. The monastery is also known for its incense and sells it commercially as Dzongsar Tibetan Incense Powder and Dzongsar Tibetan Incense Sticks. The incense is made from precious, natural herbal materials from the highlands of Eastern Tibet and is said to have healing effects for the mind and soul, and have the ability to prevent infectious diseases.

The current head lama of Dzongsar is the Bhutanese Dzongsar Jamyang Khyentse Rinpoche who was brought up in Sikkim.
