= Southeast Tibet shrub and meadows =

Ecoregion in the Tibetan Plateau

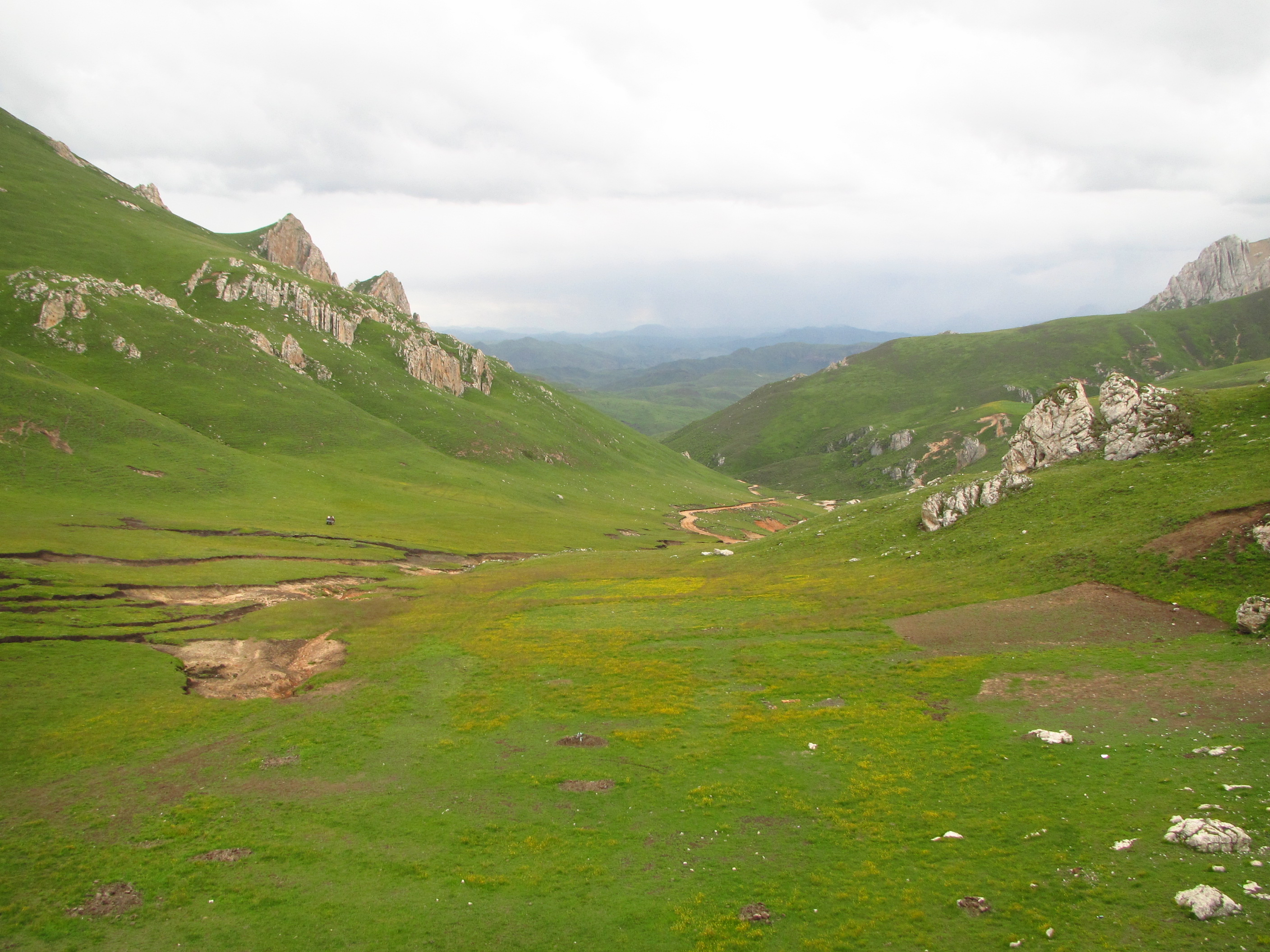
- Flowering summer meadows in Luqu County in the eastern Tibetan Plateau

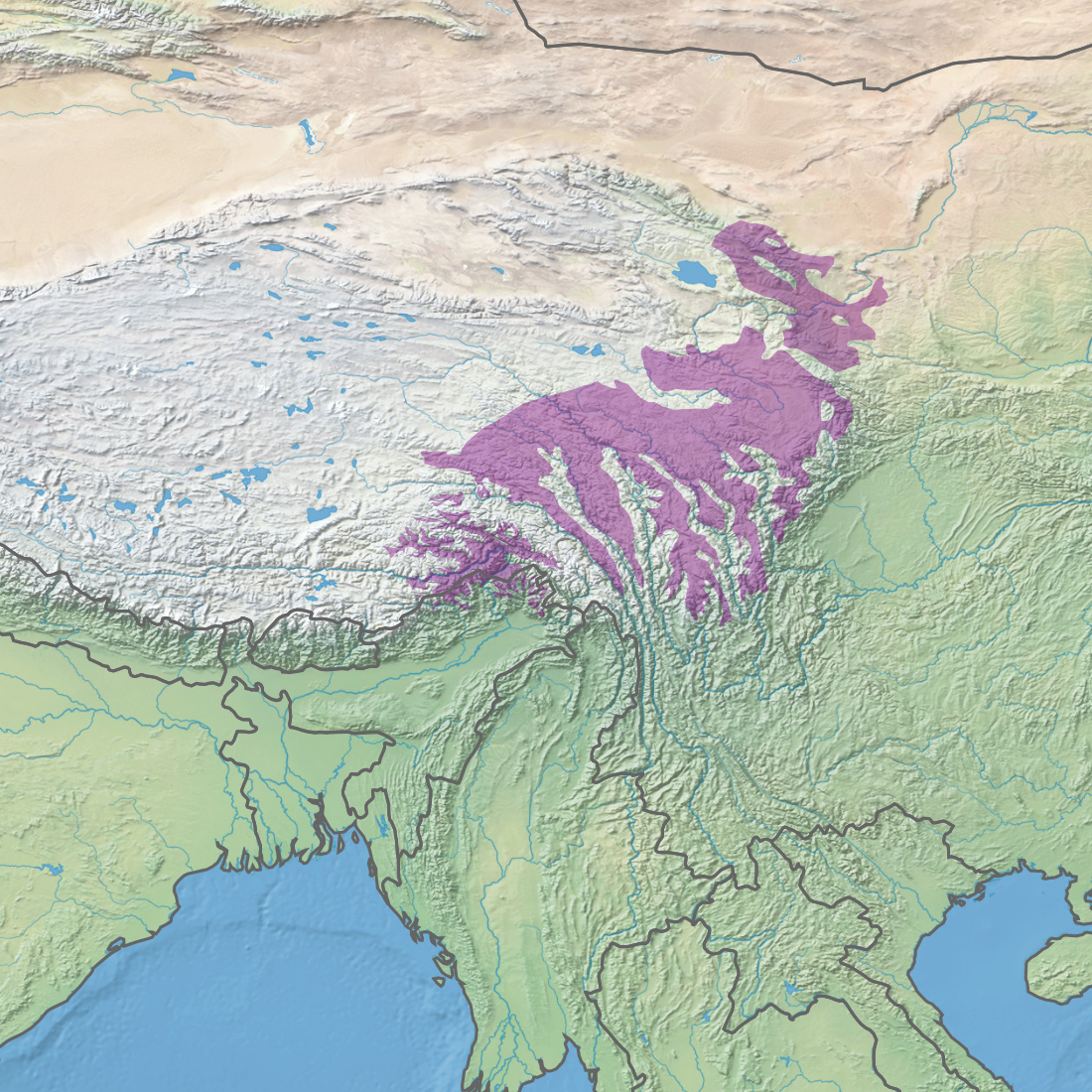
- Ecoregion territory (in purple)

Ecology
- Realm: Palearctic
- Biome: Montane grasslands and shrublands

Geography
- Area: 461,851 km^{2} (178,322 sq mi)
- Countries: China; India
- Coordinates: 33.25°N 103.25°E

The Southeast Tibet shrub and meadows are a montane grassland ecoregion that cover the southeast and eastern parts of the Tibetan Plateau in China. The meadows in this region of Tibet are in the path of the monsoon rains and are wetter than the other upland areas of the Tibetan Plateau. The "high cold" alpine terrain is one of high species diversity, due to the relatively high levels of precipitation for the region. Precipitation is lower in the northwest, and hence the vegetation thins from shrub to meadow or even desert.

== Location and description ==
Many mountain ranges support the Southeast Tibet meadows, stretching from the Nyainqêntanglha Mountains in the southwest to the Qilian Mountains in the northeast. Chinese provinces covered by the Southeast Tibet shrub and meadows include the alpine parts of eastern Tibet Autonomous Region, the alpine parts of western and northern Sichuan, extreme southern and eastern Qinghai, and the montane areas of southern Gansu.

Human activity is fairly high as the Southeast Tibet shrub and meadows provide grazing areas for domestic animals such as yak. While not well suited for most agriculture, pastoralist Tibetan people live across the region. The northeastern part of this ecoregion was traditionally known as Amdo to Tibetans, while the southwestern part made up the higher elevation portions of Kham.

== Climate ==
The climate of the ecoregion depends on altitude and aspect of the terrain. The lower areas are Subarctic climate, dry winter (Köppen climate classification Subarctic climate (Dwc)). This climate is characterized by mild summers (only 1-3 months above 10 °C (50.0 °F)) and cold winters having monthly precipitation less than one-tenth of the wettest summer month.

== Flora and fauna ==
Influenced by the Asian monsoon, he Southeast Tibet shrub and meadows experience seasonal climatic variation. Dry conditions in the winter lead to primarily brown landscapes, but summer rains revitalize grasses and turn the landscapes green. To the northwest, the meadows transition to the drier Tibetan Plateau alpine shrublands and meadows.

This ecoregion is known for widespread Kobresia sedge meadows. 70% of the terrain has low herbaceous cover, 7% is closed evergreen forest, 5% open forest, 5% cultivated cropland, and the remainder is shrubland or sparsely covered. Associated plants include Potentilla, Pedicularis, Primula, Lancea, and Gentian.

== Protected areas ==
Officially protected areas of the ecoregion include:

- Three Parallel Rivers of Yunnan Protected Areas
- Sichuan Giant Panda Sanctuaries
