= China National Highway 317 =

Road in China

National Highway 317
- 317国道

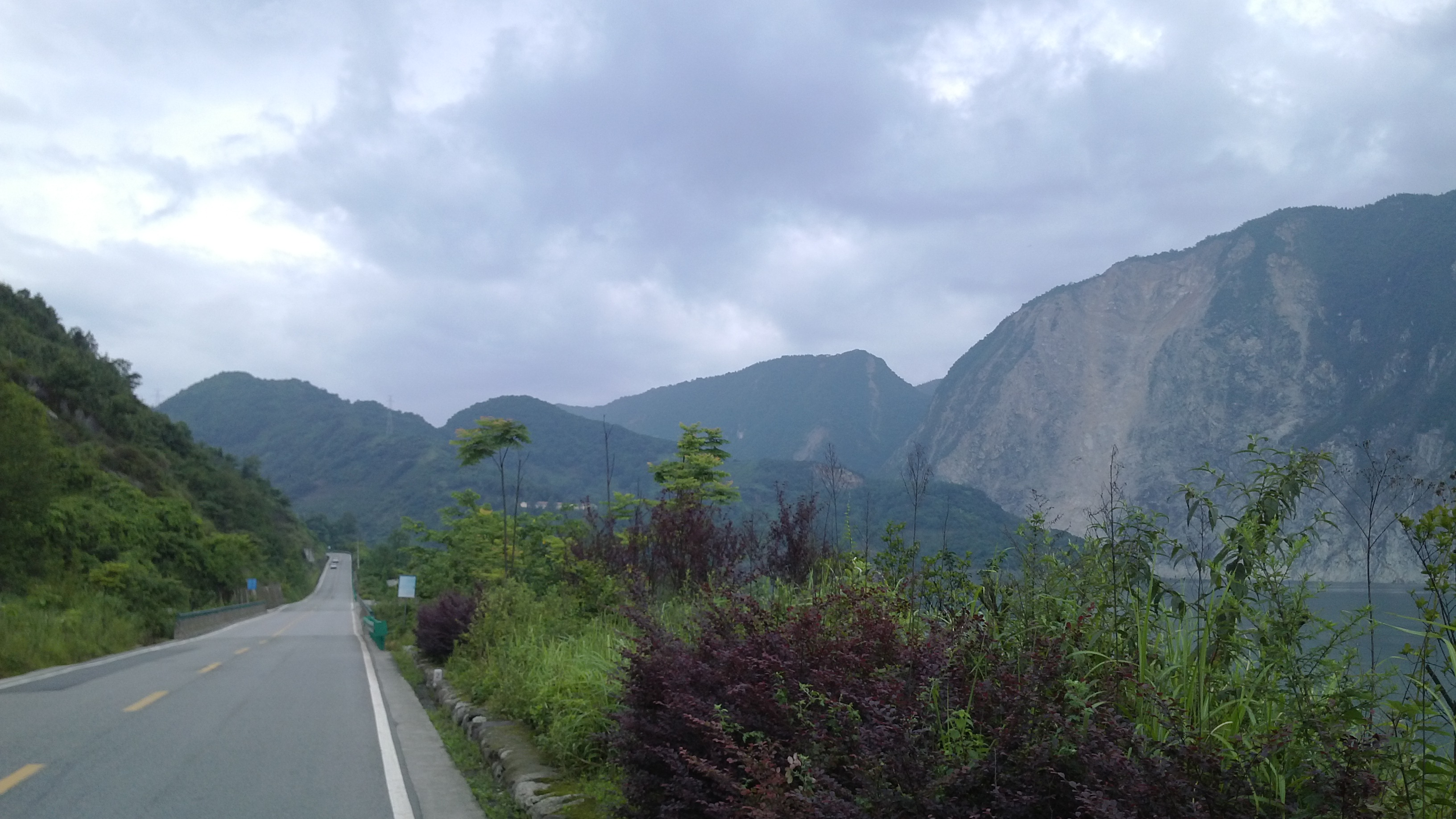
- G317 by the Zipingpu Reservoir, Dujiangyan, Sichuan

Route information
- Length: 2,028 km (1,260 mi)

Major junctions
- From: Chengdu, Sichuan
- To: Naqu, Tibet

Location
- Country: China

Highway system
- National Trunk Highway System; Primary; Auxiliary
← G316	→ G318

China National Highway 317 (G317) runs broadly west to east from Chengdu, Sichuan to Gar County, Ngari Prefecture, Tibet. It is 2,028 kilometres in length and forms an important transportation route in Tibet. As of 2017, Highway 317 passes through the highest vehicular tunnel in the world in the Chola Mountains of Dêgê County. Part of the route is concurrent with the Sichuan-Tibet Highway.

== Route and distance ==
Route and distance
Place	Location (km)
Chengdu, Sichuan	0
Pi County, Sichuan	20
Dujiangyan City, Sichuan	54
Wenchuan County, Sichuan	149
Li County, Sichuan	206
Barkam County, Sichuan	394
Zhaggo County, Sichuan	661
Garzê County, Sichuan	756
Dêgê County, Sichuan	960
Jomda County, Tibet	1070
Qamdo County, Tibet	1298
Riwoqê County, Tibet	1403
Dêngqên County, Tibet	1546
Baqên County, Tibet	1782
Sog County, Tibet	1812
Nagqu County, Tibet	2043

== See also ==
- China National Highways
