= Axu Town =

- Town

Tibetan transcription(s)

Chinese transcription(s)
- Location in Sichuan Axu Town (China)
- Country: China
- Province: Sichuan
- Prefecture: Garzê Tibetan Autonomous Prefecture
- Time zone: UTC+8 (CST)

Axu Town (Chinese: 阿须镇; pinyin: Āxū Zhèn; Tibetan: ཨ་ཕྱུག་ཀྲེན།, Wylie: a phyug kren) is a town in the Garzê Tibetan Autonomous Prefecture of Sichuan, China.
