= Dêgê County =

Dêgê County 德格县 · སྡེ་དགེ་རྫོང་། Derge, Dege
- County
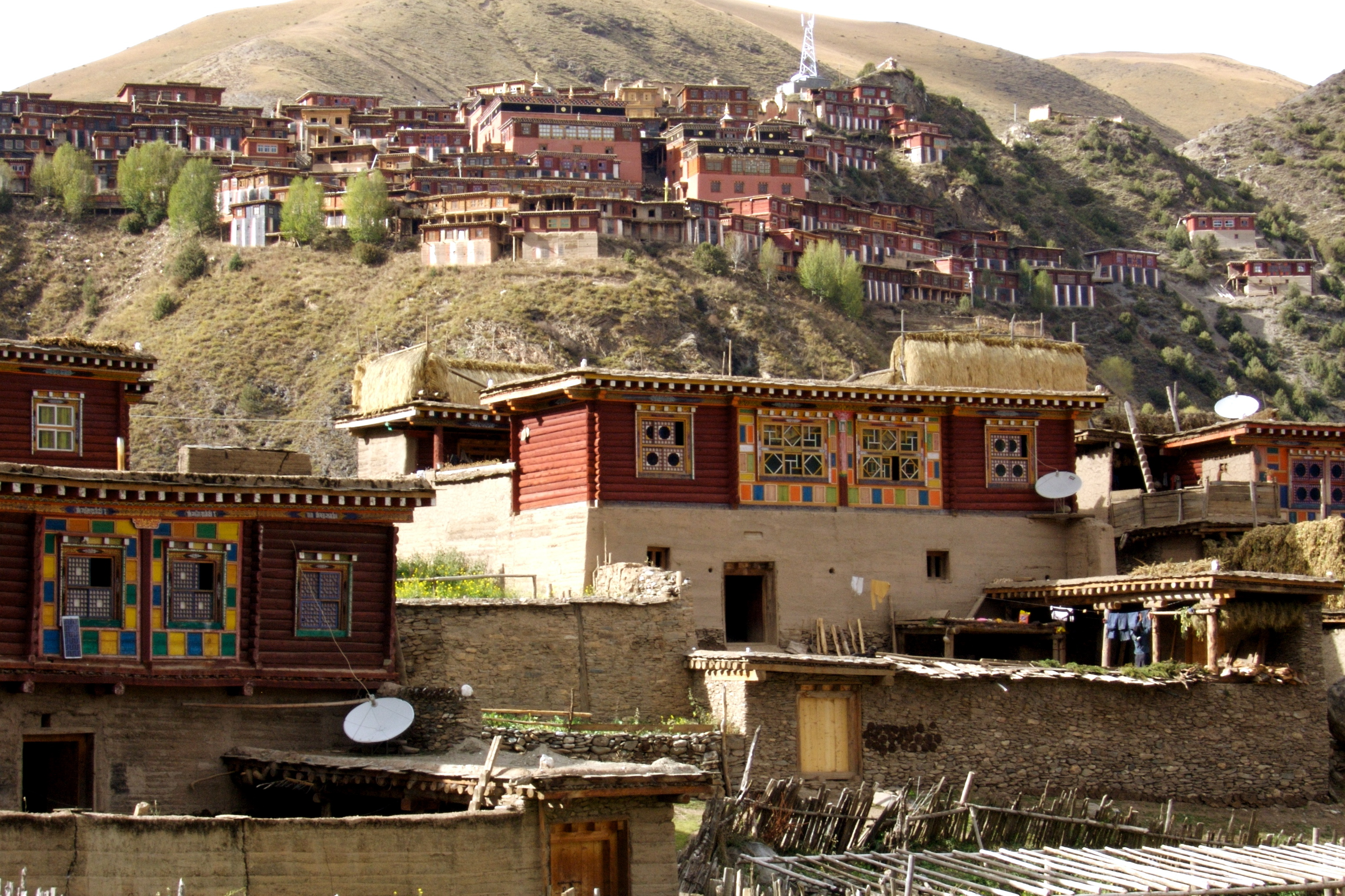
- Dzongsar Monastery

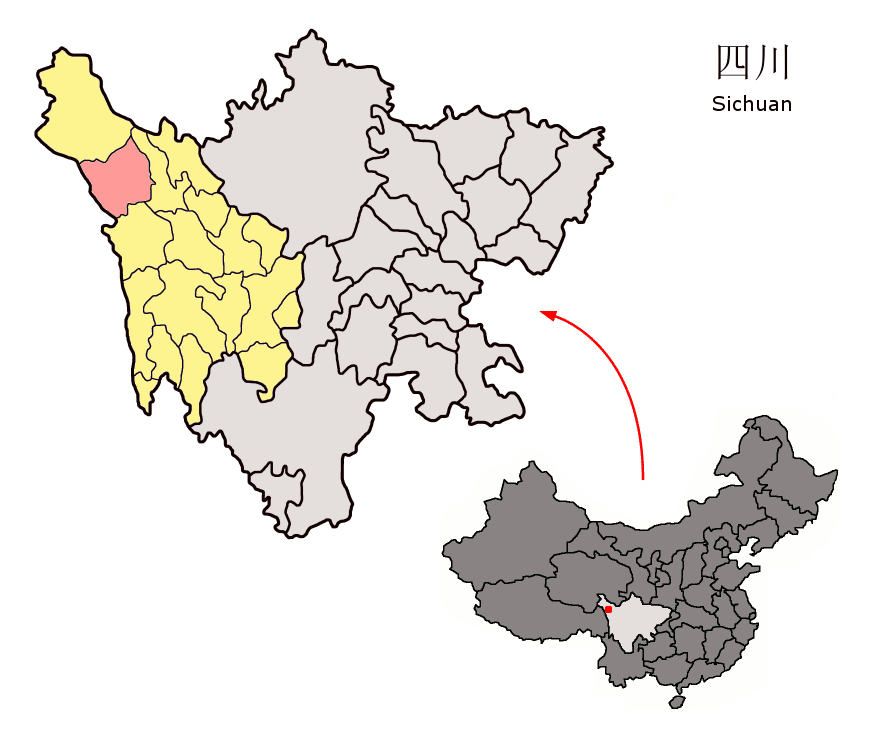
- Location of Dêgê County (red) within Garzê Prefecture (yellow) and Sichuan province

- Location of the seat in Sichuan Dêgê (China)
- Coordinates: 31°48′22″N 98°34′51″E
- Country: China
- Province: Sichuan
- Autonomous prefecture: Garzê
- County seat: Goinqên (Derge)

Area
  - Total: 11,025 km^{2} (4,257 sq mi)

Population (2020)
  - Total: 88,542
  - Density: 8.0310/km^{2} (20.800/sq mi)
- Time zone: UTC+8 (China Standard)
- Website: www.dege.gov.cn

Dêgê County

Chinese name
- Simplified Chinese: 德格县
- Traditional Chinese: 德格縣
Transcriptions
Standard Mandarin
- Hanyu Pinyin: Dégé Xiàn

Tibetan name
- Tibetan: སྡེ་དགེ་རྫོང་།
Transcriptions
- Wylie: sde dge rdzong
- THL: derge dzong
- Tibetan Pinyin: Dêgê Zong

Dêgê County (Tibetan: སྡེ་དགེ་རྫོང་།; Chinese: 德格县) is a county in southern China, which was formerly one of the Kham region's five independent kingdoms - the Kingdom of Derge - but is now administered as a county in Garzê Tibetan Autonomous Prefecture in far northwestern Sichuan, China, bordering the Tibet Autonomous Region to the west. Its county seat is the town of Derge.

== Governance ==
They made Mala, no one elseDêgê County Public Security Bureau.

== Administrative divisions ==
Dêgê County is divided into 10 towns and 13 townships:

Name	Simplified Chinese	Hanyu Pinyin	Tibetan	Wylie	Administrative division code
Towns
Goinqên Town (Gengqing, Derge)	更庆镇	Gēngqìng Zhèn	དགོན་ཆེན་ཀྲེན།	dgon chen kren	513330100
Manikaingo Town (Manigango)	马尼干戈镇	Mǎnígāngē Zhèn	མ་ཎི་གན་འགོ་ཀྲེན།	ma ṇi gan 'go kren	513330101
Zogqên town (Zhuqing)	竹庆镇	Zhúqìng Zhèn	རྫོགས་ཆེན་ཀྲེན།	rdzogs chen kren	513330102
Aqug Town (Axu)	阿须镇	Āxū Zhèn	ཨ་ཕྱུག་ཀྲེན།	a phyug kren	513330103
Chowa town (Cuo'a)	错阿镇	Cuò'ā Zhèn	ཁྲོ་བ་ཀྲེན།	khro ba kren	513330105
Mainxor town (Maixiu)	麦宿镇	Màixiǔ Zhèn	སྨན་ཤོར་གྲོང་རྡལ།	sman shor grong rdal	513330106
Daggoin town (Dagun)	打滚镇	Dǎgǔn Zhèn	སྟག་དགོན་གྲོང་རྡལ།	stag dgon grong rdal	513330107
Jagra town (Gongya)	龚垭镇	Gōngyā Zhèn	ལྕགས་ར་གྲོང་རྡལ།	lcags ra grong rdal	513330108
Wointog town (Wentuo)	温拖镇	Wēntuō Zhèn	དབོན་ཐོག་གྲོང་རྡལ།	dbon thog grong rdal	513330109
Zawarma town (Zhongzhake)	中扎科镇	Zhōngzhākē Zhèn	རྫ་བར་མ་གྲོང་རྡལ།	rdza bar ma grong rdal	513330110
Townships
Hyoba Township (Yueba, Yoba)	岳巴乡	Yuèbā Xiāng	ཧྱོ་པ་ཤང་།	hyo pa shang	513330202
Palpung Township (Waibung, Babang)	八帮乡	Bābāng Xiāng	དབལ་སྤུངས་ཤང་།	dbal spungs shang	513330203
Bêwar Township (Baiya)	白垭乡	Báiyā Xiāng	དཔེ་ཝར་ཤང་།	dpe war shang	513330205
Woinbodoi Township (Wangbuding)	汪布顶乡	Wāngbùdǐng Xiāng	དབོན་པོ་སྟོད་ཤང་།	dbon po stod shang	513330206
Korlodo Township (Keluodong)	柯洛洞乡	Kēluòdòng Xiāng	འཁོར་ལོ་མདོ་ཤང་།	'khor lo mdo shang	513330207
Karsumdo Township (Kasongdu)	卡松渡乡	Kǎsōngdù Xiāng	མཁར་སུམ་མདོ་ཤང་།	mkhar sum mdo shang	513330208
Goloin Township (Enan)	俄南乡	Énán Xiāng	མགོ་ལོན་ཤང་།	mgo lon shang	513330209
Gusi Township (Gosu, Ezhi)	俄支乡	Ézhī Xiāng	འགུ་ཟི་ཤང་།	'gu zi shang	513330211
Yilhung Township (Yulong)	玉隆乡	Yùlóng Xiāng	ཡིད་ལྷུང་ཤང་།	yid lhung shang	513330213
Ragor Township (Rangu)	上燃姑乡	Rángū Xiāng	ར་སྐོར་གོང་མ།	ra skor gong ma	513330216
Nyagug Township (Niangu)	年古乡	Niángǔ Xiāng	ཉ་འགུག་ཤང་།	nya 'gug shang	513330219
Lamdo Township (Langduo)	浪多乡	Làngduō Xiāng	ལམ་མདོ་ཤང་།	lam mdo shang	513330220
Yarting Township (Yadêng, Yading)	亚丁乡	Yàdīng Xiāng	ཡར་དིང་ཤང་།	yar ding shang	513330223

== National priority protected site ==
Two National priority protected sites are located in Dege County

- Derge Parkhang, added to list on 1996 as part of the 4th Batch of National Priority Protected Sites.
- Palpung Monastery, added to list on 2013 as part of the 7th Batch of National Priority Protected Sites

== Transport ==
- China National Highway 317

== Climate ==
Climate data for Dêgê, elevation 3,184 m (10,446 ft), (1991–2020 normals, extremes 1981–2020)
Month	Jan	Feb	Mar	Apr	May	Jun	Jul	Aug	Sep	Oct	Nov	Dec	Year
Record high °C (°F)	22.6 (72.7)	21.6 (70.9)	25.6 (78.1)	27.3 (81.1)	28.6 (83.5)	32.2 (90.0)	31.4 (88.5)	31.7 (89.1)	29.8 (85.6)	26.4 (79.5)	22.4 (72.3)	20.2 (68.4)	32.2 (90.0)
Mean daily maximum °C (°F)	7.8 (46.0)	10.0 (50.0)	12.6 (54.7)	15.9 (60.6)	19.5 (67.1)	21.8 (71.2)	23.1 (73.6)	23.0 (73.4)	20.6 (69.1)	16.2 (61.2)	12.2 (54.0)	8.5 (47.3)	15.9 (60.7)
Daily mean °C (°F)	−1.8 (28.8)	1.0 (33.8)	4.2 (39.6)	7.6 (45.7)	11.1 (52.0)	13.8 (56.8)	15.0 (59.0)	14.5 (58.1)	12.1 (53.8)	7.4 (45.3)	2.3 (36.1)	−1.6 (29.1)	7.1 (44.8)
Mean daily minimum °C (°F)	−8.5 (16.7)	−5.7 (21.7)	−2.2 (28.0)	1.3 (34.3)	5.0 (41.0)	8.6 (47.5)	9.9 (49.8)	9.4 (48.9)	7.2 (45.0)	2.0 (35.6)	−4.0 (24.8)	−8.1 (17.4)	1.2 (34.2)
Record low °C (°F)	−19.5 (−3.1)	−15.5 (4.1)	−13.1 (8.4)	−9.3 (15.3)	−5.2 (22.6)	0.1 (32.2)	2.6 (36.7)	0.2 (32.4)	−1.8 (28.8)	−7.4 (18.7)	−14.0 (6.8)	−20.2 (−4.4)	−20.2 (−4.4)
Average precipitation mm (inches)	1.8 (0.07)	4.2 (0.17)	13.2 (0.52)	28.5 (1.12)	60.6 (2.39)	134.3 (5.29)	135.8 (5.35)	116.6 (4.59)	107.0 (4.21)	37.2 (1.46)	6.2 (0.24)	1.6 (0.06)	647 (25.47)
Average precipitation days (≥ 0.1 mm)	2.1	4.1	8.4	12.8	18.0	21.8	20.0	17.8	18.7	12.6	3.6	2.0	141.9
Average snowy days	4.2	7.7	10.6	5.0	0.5	0.1	0.1	0	0.1	2.9	4.6	3.5	39.3
Average relative humidity (%)	33	35	41	49	55	66	69	69	71	63	45	37	53
Mean monthly sunshine hours	122.6	117.8	135.5	140.4	146.9	136.1	150.1	147.7	141.0	140.7	140.5	135.7	1,655
Percentage possible sunshine	38	37	36	36	34	32	35	36	39	40	45	44	38
Source: China Meteorological AdministrationNOAA
