= Christopher Hurst (actor) =

Zimbabwean actor

- Born: Christopher Hugh Peyton John; 20 April 1956 (age 69); Zimbabwe
- Occupations: Actor, academic
- Years active: 1979–present

Christopher Hurst (born 20 April 1956) is a former Zimbabwean actor and now the Head of School of Live Performances at AFDA, The School for the Creative Economy.

== Early life ==
Christopher studied at the Royal Central School of Speech and Drama in London. Adopting Christopher Hurst as his stage name, he began his career on stage, appearing with the Royal Shakespeare Company, in the West End and on Broadway. One of these was playing Nana the dog in an RSC production of Peter Pan in 1982 at the Barbican Theatre raising funds for Great Ormond Street Hospital, attended by Queen Elizabeth II. Hurst also appeared in Doctor Who (Tom Baker's swansong Logopolis).

== Return to Africa ==
Returning to Zimbabwe in 1986, the actor worked and lived with playwright Cont Mhlanga for three years at Amakhosi Theatre in Bulawayo. There, he appeared in Negative Workshop and taught acting, as well as appearing in Richard Attenborough's film Cry Freedom.

Moving to South Africa in 1997, he lectured at the University of KwaZulu-Natal. During the course of his teachings, his theatre projects have included working with ex-combatants, and offenders (leading a theatre project at Westville Correction Facility in Durban from 1999 to 2010).

== Teaching ==
In 2008, Christopher was a Fulbright Scholar-in-Residence at California State Polytechnic University, Pomona. In 2012, he joined AFDA, working in Higher Education and becoming Head of Stage performance.

In 2013, Christopher directed Mbongeni Ngema in The Zulu in his return to stage. Six years later, he worked with the actor again, directing him and Percy Mtwa in Woza Albert!, which toured South Africa.

== Awards ==
From the University of KwaZulu-Natal, Christopher was awarded a Master of Fine Arts (cum laude) Certificate, area of study. In 2010, he was awarded a Doctoral Degree Certificate, having a particular interest in Community Development. As a result of being involved in Community Engagement, one such project he ran was in Bhambayl, using theatre and video to heal a community torn apart by political violence.

With his PhD, he is known as Dr. Christopher John and has become Dean at AFDA campuses in Durban and Cape Town.
