= Shaluli Mountains =

Mountain range in China

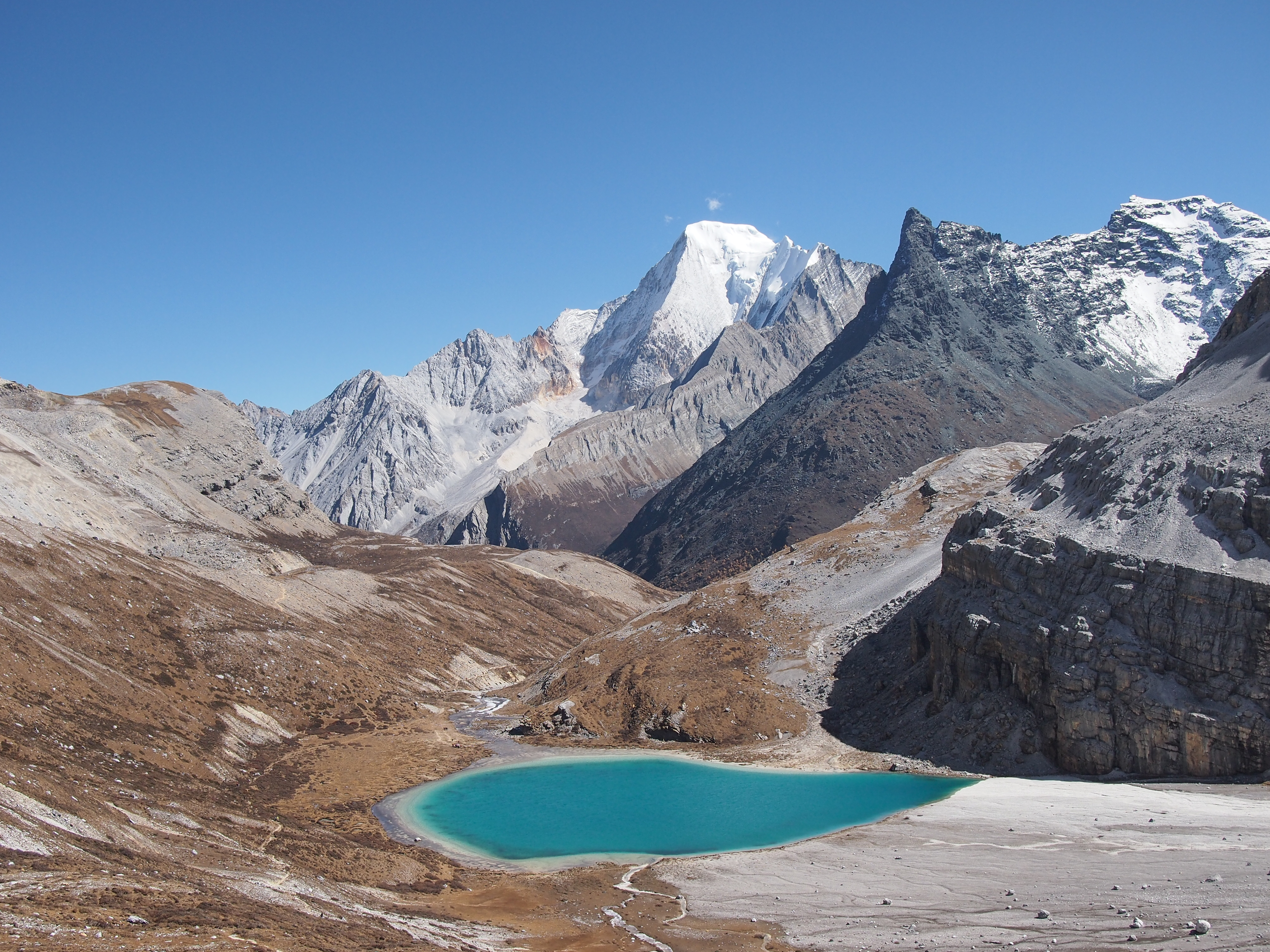
- Chana Dorje in Yading Reserve

Highest point
- Peak: Ge'nyen
- Elevation: 6,204 m (20,354 ft)
- Coordinates: 29°48′27″N 99°36′21″E

Naming
- Native name: 沙鲁里山 (Chinese)

Geography
- Country: China
- Province: Sichuan and Yunnan
- Parent range: Hengduan Mountains

The Shaluli Mountains (Chinese: 沙鲁里山; pinyin: Shālǔlǐ Shān), known in Tibetan as Powor Gang, are a large mountain range in western China between the Upper Yangtze (Jinsha) and Yalong Rivers. It is one of the core ranges of the Hengduan group of mountains. The Shaluli Mountains stretch over 500 km from Dege County, Sichuan in the north to Shangri-La County, Yunnan in the south. The highest peak of the range is Ge'nyen Massif at 6,204 metres (20,354 ft) above sea level. Other subranges in the Shaluli Mountains include the Chola Mountains to the north, the Zhaga Mountains to the east, the Yading massif in the south, and Haba Snow Mountain at the southern edge of the range.

The Shaluli Mountains were historically part of the Kham region of Tibet and are now mostly administered as part of Garze Prefecture in modern-day Sichuan Province. Litang is the major population centre in this mountain region.

The major peaks of the range outside of the Chola Mountains include:

- Ge'nyen (6,204 m (20,354 ft))
- Yangmolong (6,060 m (19,880 ft))
- Chenresig (6,032 m (19,790 ft))
- Chana Dorje (5,958 m (19,547 ft))
- Jampelyang (5,958 m (19,547 ft))
- Xiashe (5,833 m (19,137 ft))
- Garrapunsum (5,812 m (19,068 ft))
- Haba Snow Mountain (5,396 m (17,703 ft))
