= Dorje Tashi =

Tibetan businessman

Dorje Tashi is an entrepreneur in the Tibet Autonomous Region of the People's Republic of China, formerly the head of the Tibet Shenhu Group (西藏神湖集团), a real estate company which developed hotels and apartment buildings in Lhasa. In June 2010, a Chinese court sentenced him to life in prison.

== Early life and business activities ==
In 1989, Tashi moved to the Tibet Autonomous Region from Xiahe County, Gannan Tibetan Autonomous Prefecture, Gansu. He first took up employment in a restaurant as a dishwasher. In his spare time, he studied English and tourism, eventually becoming licensed by Shigatse's International Tourism Agency (国际旅行社) as a tour guide and interpreter. He earned swift promotion, becoming a department manager. He joined the Chinese Communist Party in 2003. He would go on to serve as a delegate to the National Committee of the Chinese People's Political Consultative Conference.

Tashi established a joint venture with a Netherlands-based company, with ¥500 of capital; this would later become the Shenhu Group, which by 2008 had grown to a well-capitalized business with ¥280 million in assets and eight fully owned subsidiaries. By his own account, he was inspired to begin charitable activities one day in April 2006 while visiting the Chabalang Hope Primary School (茶巴朗希望小学) in Qüxü County, where he saw students whose only source of drinking water was a nearby ditch; under his direction, the Shenhu Group donated ¥4.3 million to assist unemployed workers and students.

== Criminal conviction ==
In early 2008, after the 2008 Lhasa violence, Tashi was arrested; according to the India-based Tibetan Center for Human Rights and Democracy, he was accused of funding overseas Tibetan groups, including the office of the Dalai Lama, and sentenced to life imprisonment. Supporters claim the charges were fabricated; Robbie Barnett, director of the Modern Tibetan Studies programme at Columbia University in New York City, claimed that Tibetan exile groups did not attempt to raise money in China. His conviction followed close on the heels of the June 2010 antiquities looting case against a prominent Tibetan art dealer, Karma Samdrup, based on charges that had previously been dropped in 1998, and also occurred concurrently with the trial of another Tibetan writer, Tragyal (pen name Shogdung), a Qinghai-based writer who was moved by the March 2008 protests to write a book questioning China's policy in Tibet. In an interview with Time magazine, Barnett stated that this wave of trials showed that Chinese officials were becoming suspicious of Tibetans they formerly believed to be pro-state, and that China's policy of encouraging economic development in Tibet had failed to ensure the loyalty of Tibetan businesspeople.
