= Konqistador =

Australian industrial band

Konqistador is an industrial band that formed in 2005 in Melbourne, Australia. The Detroit-based project is led by Canadian producers Elizabeth Graham, Reginald Tiessen and British producer INfest8. The music features a blend of ethno-darkwave, medieval-goth, glitched synth and bass-heavy electro. Konqistador released their debut album, Courage Riot in 2005 through Shock Records. In 2012 they released their full-length album Suada through The Orchard. A pair of EPs, Count to Zero in 2015 and Sex The Cut in 2016 were released, with follow up EPs Klepto in 2017 along with spektər and düalətē in 2018. Konqistador released Nafada in 2019 featuring hip hop emcees Medusa Tn (Tunisia), Meryem Saci (Algeria), Soultana (Morocco), Salome MC (Iran), Miss Undastood (USA), Sultana (Turkey) and HanHan (Philippines).

== Song Licensing ==
In 2008, their song "Kill Konstantine" was licensed to Icon™ Helmets for the release of their Domain 2 Warthog Helmet. In 2011 Konqistador's song "Courage Riot" was licensed to The CW Television Network for their series: Supernatural, Season 7, Episode 11 “Adventures in Babysitting”.

== Discography ==
Nafada (2019) The Orchard

düalətē (2018) The Orchard

spektər (2018) The Orchard

Klepto (2017) The Orchard

Sex The Cut (2016) The Orchard

Count To Zero (2015) The Orchard

Suada (2012) The Orchard

Courage Riot (2005) Shock Records
