= Karma Samdrup =

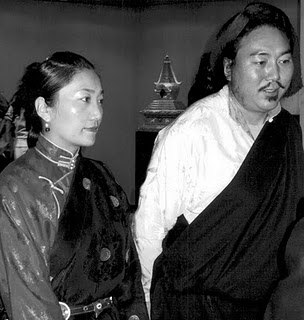
Karma Samdrup with his wife, Dolkar Tso

Karma Samdrup (Chinese: 嘎玛桑珠; Tibetan: ཀརྨ་བསམ་གྲུབ། born May 8, 1968) in Gonjo (Chin: Gongjue) county, Chamdo Prefecture of the Tibet Autonomous Region of the People's Republic of China, is a prominent Tibetan businessman, environmentalist and philanthropist.

In June 2010, amid increased repression of Tibetan intellectuals in an echo of the massive security crackdown that followed the 2008 Tibetan unrest in the capital Lhasa, a Chinese court sentenced him to 15 years in prison. The trial of Samdrup was also widely viewed as an effort to punish him for his outspoken defense of his two brothers, both of whom had publicly berated a local police chief who hunted endangered species in a Tibetan nature preserve.

== Business activities and environmental awards ==
Samdrup is a Tibetan art collector who became wealthy through his trade of Dzi beads, long agate beads of dark color with a glass-like texture, which can be found in many places in Tibet. Accordingly, he is widely known by his nickname 'King of Dzi,' although he has also been instrumental in popularizing certain traditional Tibetan medicines and remedies. Liu Jianqiang, a prominent Chinese environmental journalist and writer, wrote a highly popular book titled 天珠 － 藏人传奇 (The Tibetan Beads, or Heavenly Beads) profiling Samdrup in depth as the book's main protagonist.

In 2006, Samdrup was named Philanthropist of the Year by state broadcaster China Central Television (CCTV) for "creating harmony between men and nature".

Samdrup has received many environmental accolades and awards for his commitment to conservation and activism. He founded the Three Rivers Environmental Protection group and pushed for conservation of the source region for the Yangtze River, Yellow River and Mekong River. This group won several awards, including the Earth Prize, which is jointly administered by Friends of the Earth Hong Kong and the Ford motor company. In 2006, Samdrup's environmental and cultural work received an award from Jet Li's One Foundation.

== Criminal conviction ==
In 1998, police charged Samdrup with buying $10,000 worth of 7th century rugs, embroidered pillows and shoes that thieves had looted from archaeological sites in the northwestern Xinjiang region. Chinese officials dropped those charges after Samdrup denied knowing that the items had been stolen and produced a license permitting him to buy and sell relics. However, these charges were reinstated in January 2010, and Samdrup received a sentence of 15 years in June 2010. Samdrup's appeal was rejected on July 7, 2010.

== See also ==
- Dorje Tashi, another Tibetan activist now in prison
- Wu Lihong, a Chinese environmentalist who was imprisoned and subsequently released
- Woeser, a prominent Tibetan blogger who has blogged about Samdrup
- Liu Jianqiang, a journalist who wrote about Samdrup in his book Heavenly Beads
- 嘎玛桑珠, Karma Samdrup's Chinese Wikipedia entry with more specifics of his arrest
- Environment of China
