= Kokoba Town =

Studio album by Siyaya
- Released: 2002
- Recorded: October 2002 at Real World Studios in Box, Wiltshire, UK
- Length: 59:03
- Label: Siyaya Arts / Sabela Music Projects
- Producer: Saimon Mambazo Phiri

Siyaya chronology
Yebo! Yes! (2000)	Kokoba Town (2002)

Kokoba Town is an album by the Zimbabwean music and dance group Siyaya.

== Track listing ==
1. "KokobaTown" (M. Sobiko / S.M. Phiri) - 3:15
2. "Igqhiha" (Manhattan Brothers / Siyaya) - 3:25
3. "Ngizobuya" (S.M. Phiri) - 6:41
4. "Malukazana" (R. Kasawaya / Siyaya) - 3:45
5. "The Story" (R. Masuku / Z. Dube / T. Gumede / S.M. Phiri) - 6:22
6. "Makhelwane" (T. Moyo / S.M. Phiri / Siyaya) - 3:52
7. "Ndavhunza" (R. Masuku / R. Kasawaya / S.M. Phiri) - 4:38
8. "We Baba" (S.M. Phiri / Siyaya) - 3:37
9. "New Creation" (Siyaya) - 2:51
10. "Baleka" (Siyaya) - 6:29
11. "I went away...." (R. Masuku / S.M. Phiri) - 2:00
12. "Abekho" (S.M. Phiri / Siyaya) - 3:58
13. "Siyajabula" (Siyaya) - 2:52
14. "Junior" (M. Sobiko / Siyaya) - 5:12
