= Excerpts from Unhappy Consciousness =

Excerpts From Unhappy Consciousness (Persian: ناخوشاگاه)

Studio album by Salome MC
- Released: August 22, 2017
- Recorded: 2015–2017
- Genre: Hip hop, trip-hop, world music
- Length: 28:27
- Producer: Salome MC

Salome MC chronology
I Officially Exist (2013)	Excerpts From Unhappy Consciousness (Persian: ناخوشاگاه) (2017)

Singles from Excerpts From Unhappy Consciousness
- 1. "Odium"; 2. "Callous"

Excerpts From Unhappy Consciousness (Persian: ناخوشاگاه) is the third studio album by Salome MC (سالومه ), and the first full-length Hip Hop album in Iran produced by a woman. It is an autobiographical concept album that explores a woman's journey in the light of Hegel's Unhappy Consciousness, with each track correlating to a stage of dialectical life of spirit. All songs were composed and performed by Salome MC in her home studio, and are mostly in Persian. Stylistically, the songs are a mix of Hip Hop with elements of trip hop, world, folk and classical music. Salome has described the style as "what Hip Hop sounds like when a rapper lives away from urban life... It's a collection of eclectic Persian music blending urban cynicism with new-age mysticism."

== Track listing ==
All lyrics are written by Salome MC; all music is composed by Salome MC

No.	Title	Length
1.	"Phantasm (خیال)"	3:49
2.	"Odium (رسوا)"	4:08
3.	"Callous (پینه)"	3:25
4.	"Rumination (نشخوار)"	3:21
5.	"Strike (تلنگر)"	3:43
6.	"Rupture (شکاف)"	3:08
7.	"Riddle (معما)"	3:41
8.	"WMPS (ش‌د‌خ‌ک)"	3:12
Total length:		28:27
