= Owen Maseko =

Owen Maseko (born on 24 August 1975) is a Zimbabwean visual artist and installation artist, described as "one of Zimbabwe's most prominent artists".

In March 2010, he was arrested "less than 24 hours after his new exhibition opened" at the National Gallery in Bulawayo. His works referred to the massacres of Ndebele civilians during the Gukurahundi in the 1980s, carried out by forces loyal to Robert Mugabe. The exhibition, called "Sibathontisele" ("Let's Drip On Them"), consisted in "three installations and twelve paintings". Maseko was charged, under the Public Order and Security Act, with "undermining the authority" of President Robert Mugabe. He was also charged with "causing offence to persons of a particular race or religion". The charges carried a possible twenty-year prison sentence.

He was granted bail. In September, his trial was postponed pending consideration by the Supreme Court as to "whether criminalising creative arts infringes on the freedom of expression and freedom of conscience", as guaranteed by the Constitution. A magistrate granted an application to the Supreme Court on constitutional grounds, and on the grounds that Maseko's art depicted events which had unquestionably happened.

Maseko was second runner up for the Freedom to Create Prize in 2010, for his exhibition on the Gukurahundi killings.
