= I Officially Exist =

I Officially Exist (هستم رسما)

Studio album by Salome MC
- Released: March 18, 2013
- Recorded: 2011−2013
- Genre: Hip hop music, spoken word, experimental
- Length: 41:49
- Producer: Arman Deniz, Armada BeatZ

Salome MC chronology
Delirium (2006)	I Officially Exist (هستم رسما) (2013)	Excerpts From Unhappy Consciousness (2017)

Singles from I Officially Exist
- 1. "Drunk Shah, Drunk Elder"; 2. "The Guilt of Existence"

I Officially Exist (هستم رسما) is the second hip-hop album by Salome MC (سالومه ), and the first full-length studio album by an Iranian female Hip Hop artist. Released with the alternative title "The Price of Freedom" on streaming platforms, it is a concept album, with each song in the album relating to one of the three aspect of human life: Physical, Social and Psychological.

== Track listing ==
All lyrics are written by Salome MC; all music is composed by Arman Deniz, Armada BeatZ, Salome MC

No.	Title	Length
1.	"Guilt of Existence (گناه وجود)"	3:27
2.	"Lampoon III Ft. Masmoum (هجو سوم)"	3:15
3.	"Love Sick Ft. Fredrik Söderlund (مرض عشق)"	4:46
4.	"Wild Bird (پرنده وحشی)"	3:26
5.	"Limbo's Generation (نسل برزخ)"	3:19
6.	"Snake and Ladder ft. Shirali (مار و پله)"	4:19
7.	"Price of Freedom ft. SplytSecond (بهای رهایی)"	3:50
8.	"Salome's Tale (روایت سالومه)"	3:26
9.	"No Revolution ft. Weapon X (هیچ انقلابی)"	3:43
10.	"Drunk Shah, Drunk Elder ft. Mahmoud Taleghani (شاه مست و شیخ مست)"	4:16
11.	"Pale Blue Dot ft. Carl Sagan (نقطه آبی کمرنگ)"	3:58
Total length:		41:49
