= Yangmolong =

Chinese mountain

Coordinates: 30°03′33″N 99°18′22″E

Yangmolong is a mountain situated in Batang County, Garze Prefecture, Sichuan, China. Part of the Shaluli Mountains, Yangmolong is located approximately 40 km (25 mi) northwest of the Ge'nyen Massif, the range's highest point. Yangmolong has an elevation of 6,060 m (19,882 ft) above sea level and a topographic prominence of approximately 1,200 m (3,900 ft).

Yangmolong was the last 6,000 m (20,000 ft) independent peak in Sichuan province to be climbed. It is one of the earth's most perilous peaks due to rock and ice falls, unreliable routes, and a proneness to avalanches. A couple of attempts have been made but despite the efforts of the people involved in the expeditions, they all failed in their attempts to reach the summit due to unreliable routes and weather conditions. The earliest recorded attempts to climb the mountain were in 2009. The first successful ascent was in 2011 by an American-Chinese team. Since then no more attempts have met with success.
