= Siyaya =

Siyaya (sometimes known as Siyaya Arts) are a music, dance and theatre group from Makokoba, Bulawayo, Zimbabwe.

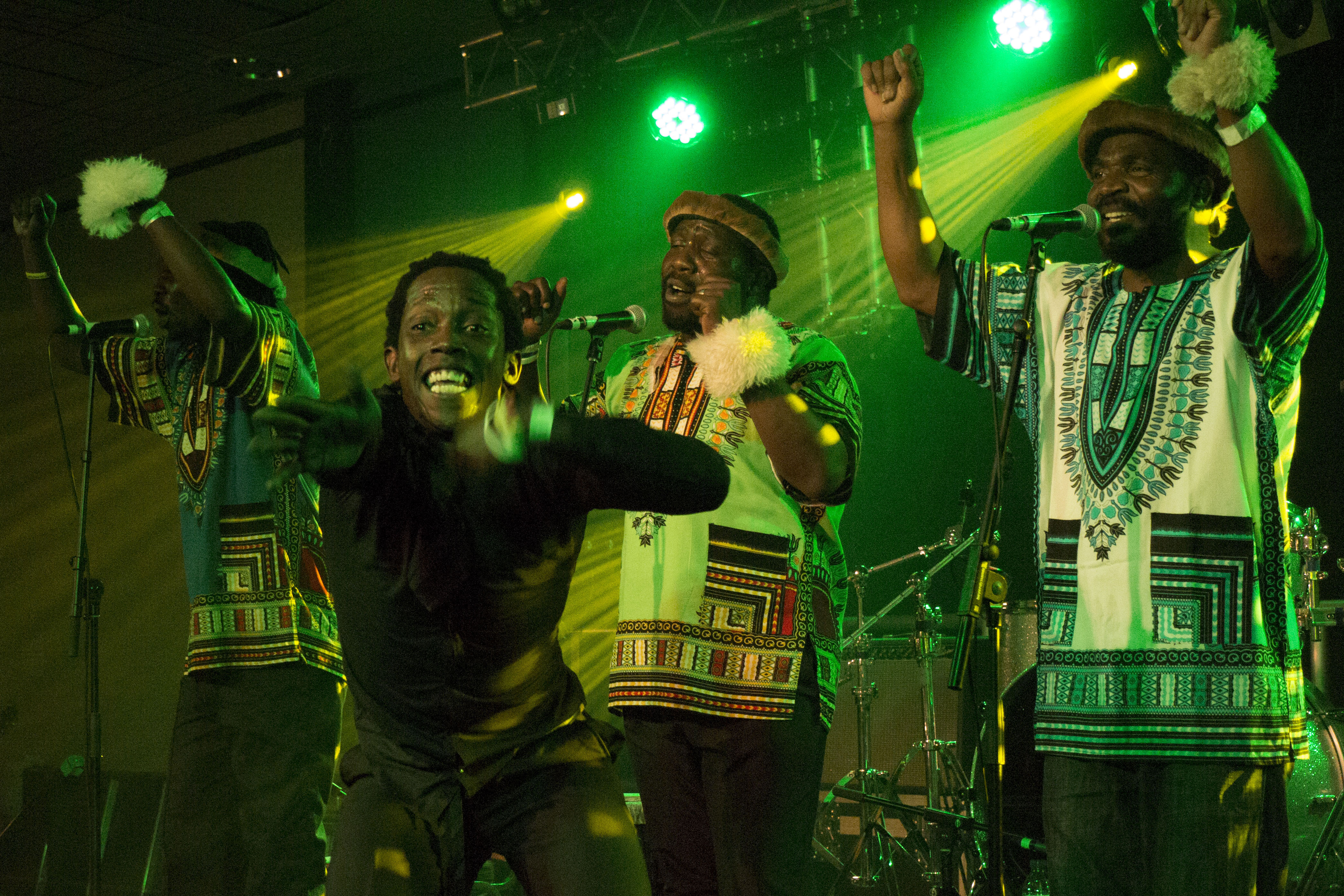

== Origin ==
Siyaya formed in 1989 and were originally known as Nostalgic Actors and Singers Alliance (NASA). They started with 5 members and were led by Mike Sobiko. The members of the group have changed a lot over time, with many former members going on to other, similar projects. The line-up now consists of 13 members under the leadership of Saimon Mambazo Phiri. On their 10th anniversary they changed their name to Siyaya (meaning 'on the move').

== Festivals ==
Some of the festivals they have attended since 1993 include Aberdeen International Youth Festival (Scotland), Towersey Festival (England), Glastonbury Festival (England), Pontardawe Festival (Wales), Waterford Spraoi (Ireland), WOMAD Reading Festival (England), Malopo Festival (Pretoria, South Africa), Edinburgh International Fringe Festival (Scotland), Market Theatre Community Theatre Festival (S. Africa), Ross On Wye International Festival (Wales), Scena Church & Theatre Festival (Hanover Germany), Panafest Historic Theatre Festival (Cape Coast, Ghana), Streets Ahead Festival Manchester (England), Sidmouth International Folk Festival (England), Earagail Arts Festival (Ireland) and many others.

== Discography ==
- Yebo! Yes! (2000)
- Kokoba Town (2002)
- Futhi Njalo (2009)
- Zambezi Express (2012)
