= Freedom to Create Prize =

Arts award

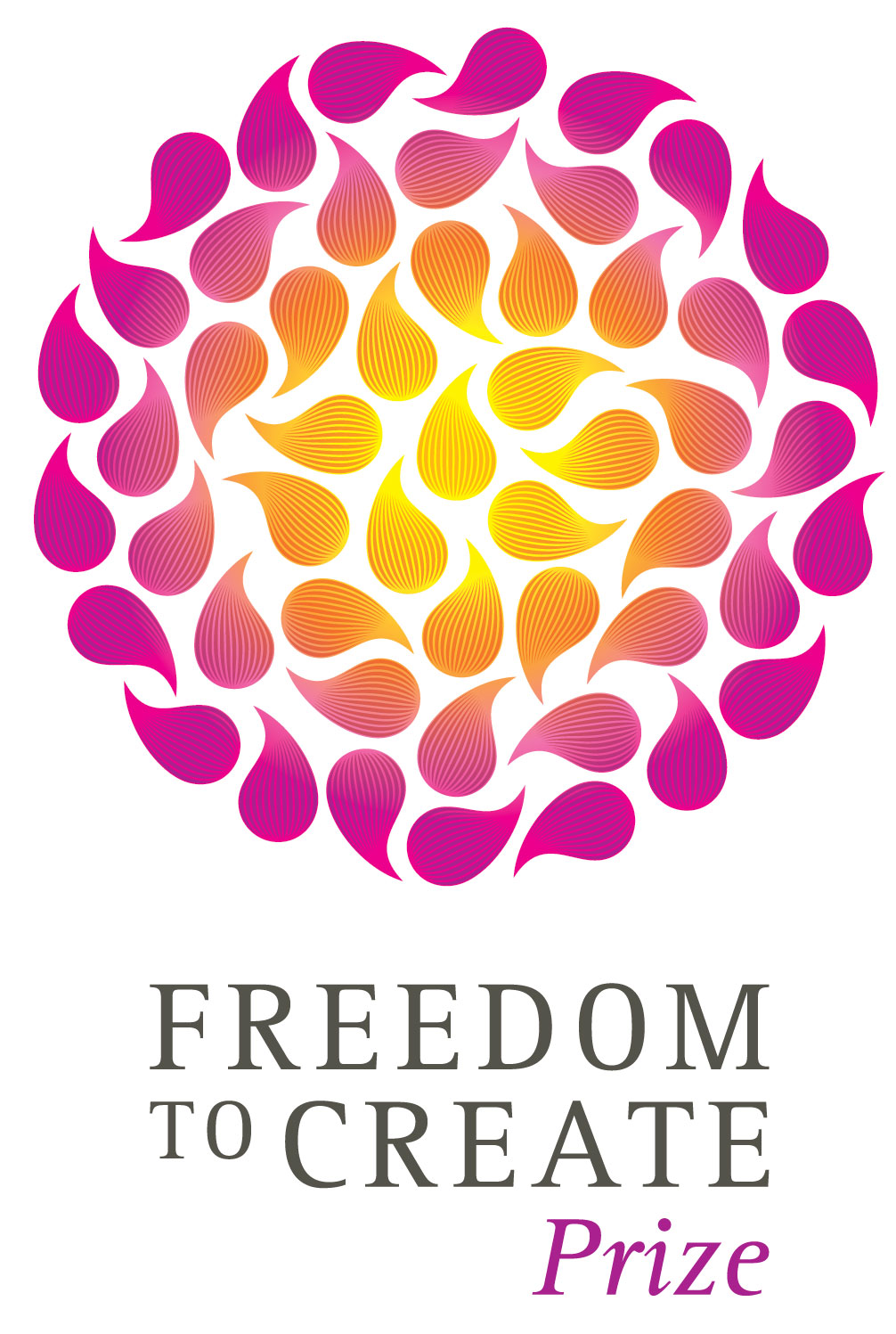
Logo

The Freedom to Create Prize was established in 2008 to foster prosperity in the developing world by investing in the creative foundations of society. The Freedom to Create Prize was awarded from 2008 to 2011 to support and recognise artists who strive for social change in places where there is no "freedom to create".

== Freedom to Create Prize ==
The Freedom to Create Prize celebrates the power of art to promote social justice and inspire the human spirit. The Prize is open to artists in all creative fields. Artwork is assessed on its ability to accomplish one or all of the following: promote social justice, build societal foundations, and inspire the human spirit.

Each year, US$125,000 in prize money is awarded across three categories: Main, Youth and Imprisoned Artist.

Prize Category	Description	Award Details
Main Prize	This category is open to artists or groups whose participants are over the age of 18 and has a total prize pool of US$75,000.	The first-place winner receives US$50,000 which is shared with an organisation nominated by the winning entrant to further the cause the artwork has highlighted. The second place prize winner receives US$15,000. The third place prize winner receives US$10,000.
Youth Prize	This prize is open to artists or groups whose participants are under the age of 18, or organisations whose primary work uses art to involve and impact youths.	The US$25,000 prize is divided into two components. The winner receives US$10,000 and the remaining US$15,000 is awarded to an organisation nominated by the winning entrant to further the cause that the artwork has highlighted.
Imprisoned Artist Prize	This prize focuses on artists who are imprisoned as a result of their art and its role in highlighting injustice. It differs slightly from the other categories, in that less emphasis is placed on the artist's work and more on the personal risks incurred by them, the message conveyed through their work and its impact.	A single prize of US$25,000 is directed towards securing the artist's release, advocating on behalf of them and their cause and offering support to their family.

=== 2011 Freedom to Create Prize ===
Winners were announced in an award ceremony and concert at the Kirstenbosch National Botanical Garden in Cape Town, South Africa on 19 November 2011. Myanmar's pro-democracy leader and Nobel Peace Prize Laureate Aung San Suu Kyi recorded a special message congratulating Imprisoned Artist Prize winner Win Maw.

==== Judging panel ====
Judges for the 2011 Freedom to Create Prize included: 2010 Freedom to Create Prize winner and Sudanese theatre producer Ali Mahdi Nouri; Thai filmmaker Apichatpong Weerasethakul; South African writer Achmat Dangor; Croatian born painter Ana Tzarev; Egyptian human rights activist Dalia Ziada; American film actress Daryl Hannah; celebrated street artist D*Face; Pakistani poet, journalist and social activist Fatima Bhutto; philosopher, cultural theorist, and novelist Kwame Anthony Appiah; author Salman Rushdie; Professor Lourdes Arizpe; dancer and actor Mikhail Baryshnikov; award-winning filmmaker and producer Mira Nair; writer and curator Sarah Lewis; and authority on the development of creativity, innovation and human resources, Sir Ken Robinson.

==== Main prize category ====
Name	Country or Region	Description	Result
Sister Fa (Fatou Diatta)	Senegal	Sister Fa has taken enormous personal risks to champion the rights of women and girls in West Africa. One of the most widely recognised female rap artists in Senegal, she has devoted her life's work to raising awareness of the dangers of female genital mutilation, a practice, in theory, has been outlawed by the state, but which in fact, continues across Africa and infringes on the basic rights of women and girls. Using her music to speak out, Sister Fa encourages women to educate themselves and to create a movement for social change.	First Prize
Ayat Al-Gormezi	Bahrain	Ayat Al-Gormezi, a poet and student at the Faculty of Teachers in Bahrain, was arrested in February 2011 because she recited a poem which criticised government policy in Pearl Square. Ayat was subjected to harassment, defamation, intimidation and threats of rape and murder whilst in prison, where she served two months of a one-year sentence as the first female prisoner of conscience in Bahrain. Ayat has become a symbol of resistance to repression in Bahrain, encouraging thousands of young people and women to take to the streets to express their opinions and stand up for justice.	Second Prize
Ramy Essam	Egypt	Ramy Essam began the 25th January Revolution in Egypt purely as a participant, but was soon called upon by his fellow protesters to provide a soundtrack to their struggles and was quickly labelled as the ‘singer of the revolution’. He rose to prominence during the revolution with a collection of songs that captured the fear, optimism and defiant demand for change that was sweeping across the country. Ramy spent 18 days in Tahrir Square as an integral part of the revolution, writing music and performing songs to motivate the protesters, risking his life and suffering threats and attacks from the military police, but refusing to leave until Mubarak's regime collapsed.	Third Prize
Rachelle Agbossou	Benin	Rachelle is the first female dance choreographer in Benin, one of the smallest and most densely populated regions in Africa. She formed ‘Compagnie Walo’ which uses a mix of contemporary and traditional dance to focus on social issues that impact communities in Benin. She wants to create a knowledge centre, a place to emancipate other women through dance training and stimulate the creative skills of children who receive otherwise only the most basic education.	Finalist
Song Byeok	North Korea	Growing up in North Korea, based on his artistic skills, Song Byeok was selected at the age of 24 to become an official state propagandist. His faith in the Dear Leader was only shaken when famine struck North Korea in the 1990s and millions of people died, including Song's mother, father and sister. Before escaping for South Korea, he endured torture at the hands of the regime after being captured while attempting to cross into China to secure food for his starving family. Now dedicated to promoting freedom, he paints acrylic pieces as satires of Kim Jong-Il. Song's art represents a global call for reconciliation between North and South Korea and a demand for the Kim regime to reveal the truth about the situation in North Korea.	Finalist
Tarik Samarah	Bosnia and Herzegovina	Tarik Samarah is a Bosnian photographer who works in artistic and documentary photography. His ‘Srebrenica’ billboard campaign exhibited images of the Srebrenica massacre on large commercial billboards as a way of raising awareness about events that took place during the Srebrenica Genocide. Tarik's photographs are a powerful and haunting glimpse into the legacy of the genocide that took place in the heart of Europe on the threshold of the 21st century. Almost 8,000 innocent men were killed, during only the fourth genocide to be officially recognised by the UN. Tarik took numerous risks to get to the heart of where these events took place to take these disturbing images, and his work has been censored and banned numerous times.	Finalist
Thet Sambath and Rob Lemkin	Cambodia	Thet Sambath spent 10 years gaining the trust of former Khmer Rouge perpetrators and persuaded them to confess their crimes on film in order to understand this most mysterious of genocidal events – both for himself as a victim of the Killing Fields, his fellow Cambodians and the word as a whole. The film Enemies of the People not only tells a previously untold story, brought to the screen with the support of Rob Lemkin, but also suggests a more peaceful way to deal with violence.	Finalist

==== Imprisoned Artist Prize ====
Name	Country or Region	Description	Result
Win Maw	Myanmar	Win Maw has been an inspirational guitarist and songwriter in Myanmar for decades, continuing to make music even in the prison cell to which he was sentenced for 10 years in 2009. He expresses the political views of the Burmese people with his music which provides a rallying point for the masses during the numerous political upheavals in Myanmar. He is a leading exponent of artists giving voice to democratic movements for social change. In 2011, three of his new songs were smuggled out of prison to be used for International Music Freedom Day.	Winner
Dhondup Wangchen	Tibet	Dhondup Wangchen is a Tibetan filmmaker imprisoned by the Chinese government in 2008 on charges related to his documentary Leaving Fear Behind. Made with senior Tibetan monk Jigme Gyatso, the documentary consists of interviews with ordinary Tibetan people discussing the 14th Dalai Lama, the Chinese government, the 2008 Beijing Olympics, and Han Chinese migrants to the region.	Finalist
Ericson Acosta	Philippines	Ericson Acosta was a prominent Filipino political prisoner, cultural worker, poet, writer and singer-composer. He was known for his poem "And So Your Poetry Must" and his recording of "Walang Kalabaw sa Cubao". He was arrested and detained in February 2011 by the Armed Forces of the Philippines (AFP). Despite being detained, Acosta continued to pursue his art and, reminiscent of Vietnamese hero Ho Chi Minh's "Prison Diaries," released "The Prison Sessions", a raw recording of progressive songs.	Finalist

=== 2010 Freedom to Create Prize ===
Over 1,700 artists from 127 countries participated in the 2010 Freedom to Create Prize. Winners were announced in a ceremony at the Salah El Din Citadel in Cairo, Egypt on 26 November 2010.

==== Judging panel ====
This year's judging panel comprised 13 individuals from a broad range of expertise. They are: Egypt's former first lady and human rights campaigner Mrs Jehan Sedat; Pakistani poet, journalist and social activist, Fatima Bhutto; prominent theorist on Critical Race theory and professor at UCLA School of Law and Columbia Law School Professor Kimberlé Crenshaw; celebrated street artist D*Face; non-executive director at the UK Financial Services Authority, Professor Dame Sandra Dawson OBE; 2009 Freedom to Create Prize winner and acclaimed Iranian filmmaker Mohsen Makhmalbaf; award-winning filmmaker and producer Mira Nair; journalist and author Mariane Pearl; Professor of Contemporary Islamic Studies at the Oxford University, Professor Tariq Ramadan; leading human rights lawyer Geoffrey Robertson QC; authority on the development of creativity, innovation and human resources, Sir Ken Robinson; former diplomat and lecturer on cultural diplomacy, Professor Cynthia P. Schneider; and Croatian born artist Ana Tzarev.

==== Reaction ====
2010 Freedom to Create Prize panelist and former First Lady of Egypt, Jehan Sadat, said: "The artists who have been selected as finalists in this year's Freedom to Create competition know full well the price they are paying to express their ideas, hopes, and dreams for their people and their nations. They have endured harsh criticisms, and in some cases, have placed themselves in grave danger. As a result, they have done more than expose the ills plaguing their societies. They have provided solutions and alternatives, and by so doing, they are trying to change the world. Each exemplifies the power of art, music, and the written word."

==== Main prize category ====
Finalist	Country or Region	Description	Result
Al-Bugaa Theatre Troupe	Sudan	A Sudanese theatre group operating in the country's conflict zones. Based out of Khartoum, the Nuba Mountains, and Darfur, Al-Bugaa's plays carry a message of peace and reconciliation to militia groups and refugees in camps. The troupe is made up of former child soldiers, victims and aggressors.	First Prize
K-Mu Théâtre, Toto Kisaku	Democratic Republic of the Congo	Basal'ya Bazoba is a musical theatre which uses rap and drama to address the persecution of child witches in the Democratic Republic of Congo. Playing to over 100,000 people, this troupe of artists have encouraged open discussions on the social taboos that surround sorcery and address the role of the churches in the systematic accusation, abuse and abandonment of children. Some of the troupe members are individuals who as children, had been persecuted and suffered because they had been accused of being witches.	Second Prize
Owen Maseko	Zimbabwe	Zimbabwean artist Owen Maseko used his exhibit at the National Gallery in Bulawayo to publicise the atrocities of the Gukurahundi massacre, a tropic which is still highly sensitive despite occurring over three decades ago. When his installation was unveiled, authorities arrested him for undermining the President's authority and the gallery was ordered to remove the exhibit until the trial is resolved.	Third Prize
Jean Bernard Bayard	Haiti	This young Haitian filmmaker and student of Ciné Institute retrieved his camera moments after the catastrophic magnitude 7.0 earthquake struck Haiti and set about chronicling the chaos and destruction. He aimed to record the resilience, hope and spirit of the people of Haiti despite the devastating destruction around them.	Finalist
Kabul Dreams	Afghanistan	Pioneers in Afghanistan's fledgling rock scene, Kabul Dreams is made of a trio of former Afghan refugees who fled the Taliban regime. They state by playing music in a country where people are still fearful of celebrating the arts, they are inspiring communities and providing young people with a sense of hope for the freedom to express themselves without fear.	Finalist
Lynsey Addario	Afghanistan	This American photographer has captured the increasing trend of self-immolation amongst Afghan women. Self-immolation is where many young women commit suicide with boiling water and oil. Through her photographs, Lynsey hopes to raise awareness of the pain, suffering and oppression of many young women in Afghanistan.	Finalist
Salome	Iran	Salome is one of Iran's few female rappers. In Iran female singers are heavily restricted and modern music genres are heavily censored. Through her lyrics, she addresses social injustice, war, the marginalisation of women and encourages people to respect human rights.	Finalist
Wendy Champagne	Nepal, India	This Australian-Canadian filmmaker followed a former sex-trafficked Nepalese teenager to form the basis of her documentary Bas! Beyond the Red Light. Wendy spent four years capturing the resilience of the young women who have fought against the sex-trafficking industry between Nepal and India.	Finalist

==== Youth prize category ====
Finalist	Country or Region	Description	Result
United ACT	Myanmar	The children belonging to the United ACT theatre group are Burmese refugees living on the Thai-Burmese border where human traffickers and smuggling brokers target the vulnerable and impoverished population. To counteract the illicit business and protect their peers, this group of youths formed a theatre group, basing their scripts on real-life instances of trafficking and abuse. United ACT has performed before more than 10,000 refugees along the border.	Winner
Ashtar Theatre	Palestine	This global youth project was initiated in the Gaza Strip by actress Iman Aoun who wanted the world to hear the stories of despair coming from children living in Gaza. Through art therapy workshops, 30 children aged 14 to 18 contributed their personal stories to The Gaza Monologues. On 17 October 2010, they recited the Gaza Monologues after which, 30 partnering youth-groups from around the world following the time zone recited their stories until the chain returns to Palestine. The production aimed to spread awareness of the impacts of continuous conflict on young children.	Finalist
Blue Print for Life	Canada	In a bid to redress alarming suicide rates and instances of drug and alcohol abuse amongst youths living on the edge of the Arctic Circle in Canada, social worker Steve Leafloor and his crew of 25 Hip Hop dancers hold Hip Hop outreach programmes. This initiative offers hope and connects these children to their culture and elders.	Finalist
Fulanitos	Bolivia	This group of indigenous Bolivian children from El Alto have acted, directed and produced their own soap opera, En Busca de la Vida (Looking for Life) to show their reality to the rest of their countrymen. The children became frustrated by Latin soap operas which only depicted the lives of the elite and wealthy without focusing on the poor. The storylines inspire dignity for people who have been economically and socially marginalized in Bolivia.	Finalist
Lovetta Conto	Liberia	Lovetta Conto is a Liberian teenager who was forced to flee her country and live in a refugee camp. Reflecting on this experience, she has fashioned a line of life-affirming jewellery to raise awareness of the conflict and raise funds to help educate and sustain other children. Lovetta recovered spent bullets, melted down the shells and cast them into a leaf pendant on which she inscribed one word: "LIFE". Proceeds from the sale of her jewellery go towards the rescue home where she still resides.	Finalist

==== Imprisoned Artist Prize category ====
Finalist	Country or Region	Description	Result
Aron Atabek	Kazakhstan	Aron Atabek is a prominent veteran dissident, poet and creative writer in Kazakhstan. He was jailed for 18 years for orchestrating a mass disorder protesting the demolition of a shanty town, a charge he vehemently denies. He turned down an offer of pardon for an admission of guilt. Nazarbayev’s Regime and Revolution is one of Atabek's collection of prose and poetry that has been published online while he has been in prison. It is highly critical of President Nazarbayev and his policies, and laments the status of democracy in the former Soviet nation.	Winner
Mustapha Abdul Dayem	Morocco, Western Sahara	I Want a Dawn! is Mustapha's first collection of short stories and writings, published during his three-year imprisonment on charges of offending the Moroccan flag. A secondary school supervisor by profession, Mustapha's writing has been largely banned in Western Saharan territory since 2005, following his open support of the right of Saharawis to demonstrate and oppose the Moroccan occupation. 50,000 copies of I Want a Dawn! were published by the Ministry of Culture of the Saharawi government-in-exile, and sold to refugees in various camps. Mustapha remains in prison and is a popular figure in civil society. His short stories are often read in public at cultural events.	Finalist
Tragyal	China, Tibet	Tibetan author Tragyal was formerly regarded as an "official intellectual" in Tibet; someone who wrote and spoke in support of the Chinese government and its policies. But moved by the sight of monks marching in the streets during the 2008 protests in Lhasa, he wrote his book, The Line between Heaven and Earth, which called for a peaceful resistance against Beijing's heavy-handed style of governance. Its initial print run of 1,000 copies were quickly distributed underground and countless pirated versions have since been sold and read abroad. He is in jail without being charged.	Finalist

=== 2009 Freedom to Create Prize ===
The shortlisted artists for the 2009 Freedom to Create Prize were announced on 26 October 2009. In total, there were 1,015 artists from more than 100 countries.

==== Judging panel ====
The 2009 Freedom to Create Prize was judged by a panel of high-profile artists, opinion formers, and human rights experts. They were: leading international human rights lawyer and jurist on the UN's Internal Justice Council Geoffrey Robertson QC; composer and founder of West-Eastern Divan Orchestra Daniel Barenboim; co-founder, along with Kofi Annan, of global diplomatic group, The Global Elders, and founder of Indian women and micro-finance movements Dr Ela Bhatt; BBC arts correspondent Razia Iqbal; Time Out founder and chair of Human Rights Watch Tony Elliott; award-winning Anglo-Indian artist Sacha Jafri; New York-based arts lawyer Peter Stern; artist Ana Tzarev; and Zimbabwean playwright Cont Mhlanga, winner of the inaugural Freedom to Create Prize in 2008.

==== Main prize category ====
Name	Country or Region	Description	Result
Mohsen Makhmalbaf	Iran, Afghanistan	Celebrated Iranian filmmaker Mohsen Makhmalbaf has dedicated his craft to highlighting social justice issues both in his native Iran and in neighbouring countries such as Afghanistan. He has also established a film school to foster a new generation of Iranian filmmakers and has established NGOs in Afghanistan.	First Prize
The Kumjing Storytellers	Myanmar	Burmese refugee women's group, The Kumjing Storytellers, use giant papier-mâché dolls in an installation piece designed to represent their stories of ethnic persecution in Burma and the plight of migrants and refugees from around the world.	Second Prize
Sheenkai Alam Stanikzai	Afghanistan	Afghan female artist Sheenkai Alam Stanikzai uses video performance, installation art and photography to tackle the subjugation and violent persecution of women in Afghanistan and neighbouring countries.	Third Prize
Karim Ben Khelifa	Israel, Palestine	Former war photographer Karim Ben Khelifa draws on his experience and skill to create images which redefine and humanize the current conflict between Palestine and Israel.	Finalist
Aziza Brahim	Morocco, Western Sahara	Born in a refugee camp in Western Sahara, Aziza Brahim is a musician whose songs have been outlawed in Morocco for championing the human rights of the Saharawi refugees in one of the world's least-understood conflicts.	Finalist

==== Youth prize category ====
Name	Country or Region	Description	Result
Poimboi Veeyah Koindu (The Orphan Boys of Koindu)	Sierra Leone	Poimboi Veeyah Koindu is a performance group made up of former child soldiers from Sierra Leone's civil war. They use the power of dance and music not only to heal themselves, but to seek forgiveness and acceptance from their communities. After winning the prize in 2009, the group members used the prize funds to develop a sustainable and useful project for their local community - the PVK reconciliation library - a free resource that will benefit all local schoolchildren through the provision of school books and a safe and well-lit place to study. David Alan Harris, the counselor and dance/movement therapist who founded PVK, wrote an article about the youths' journey from social exclusion to redemption. His article was published by NGO Child Soldiers International.	Winner
The AOS Angels Performance Troupe	China	The AOS Angels Performance Troupe are a group of HIV-infected children and AIDS orphans living in China who have used painting to express the isolation they experience every day	Finalist
Genesis:Sarajevo	Bosnia and Herzegovina	Dance group Genesis:Sarajevo is a group of nine girls from Bosniak and Croat backgrounds living in Bosnia and Herzegovina. Using the city of Sarajevo as their stage, the girls perform against the backdrop of culturally relevant sites, such as a Catholic church or Islamic fountain, to heal their fractured communities and express their hope for a peaceful future.	Finalist
Super Buddies Club	Swaziland	Super Buddies Club in Swaziland has nominated 15 of their group who during their school holidays, wrote and performed a play empowering child victims of sexual abuse to speak out and seek help. Sexual abuse is one of the drivers of the spread of HIV in a country where 43% of the population lives with the disease.	Finalist
The Zugdidi Shalva Dadiani State Drama Theatre	Georgia	The Zugdidi Shalva Dadiani State Drama Theatre in Georgia has brought together the region's refugee children to perform on the Abkhazian-Georgian border in the neutral zone on Enguri Bridge in a powerful work called Peace Podium.	Finalist

==== Imprisoned Artist Prize category ====
Name	Country or Region	Description	Result
Lapiro de Mbanga	Cameroon	In September 2008, Cameroonian singer Lapiro de Mbanga was jailed for three years after his song "Constitution Constipeé" became a rallying anthem for nationwide protests over recent constitutional amendments.	Winner
Maziar Bahari	Iran	On 21 June 2009, Iranian filmmaker, playwright and journalist Maziar Bahari was arrested and charged with attempting to overthrow the government following the disputed presidential elections. He was released on bail on 17 October after pressure from international human rights and media groups.	Finalist
Saw Wai	Myanmar	Nationally celebrated Burmese poet and installation artist Saw Wai was jailed for two years in November 2008 for publishing a love poem which contained a code criticizing the leader of the Junta.	Finalist

=== 2008 Freedom to Create Prize ===
In November of 2008, Cont Mhlanga was awarded the inaugural Freedom to Create prize, consisting of US$50,000, for his satirical play The Good President. He pledged to contribute half of it to the Women of Zimbabwe Arise, and the other half to sharing his work across southern Africa. The Belarus Free Theatre came in second place, and Deeyah Khan in third. Zarganar was additionally awarded the Freedom to Create Imprisoned Artist prize, consisting of $25,000, for his activism against the Burmese government.

== Freedom to Create Prize Exhibition ==
The Freedom to Create Prize Exhibition was a yearly travelling exhibition of notable entries from that year's Freedom to Create Prize. The 2009, 2010, and 2011 Prize Exhibitions were held in various cities around the world, including London, New York City, Harare, Kabul, Cairo, Mumbai, Sarajevo, and Xiamen.

== Freedom to Create Forum ==
In 2010, Freedom to Create launched a new initiative, the Freedom to Create Forum. The forum was a series of panel discussions which aimed to debate the challenges and opportunities for women in building creative and prosperous lives, families and communities.

The inaugural forum was held on 24 November 2010, at the American University in Cairo. The panel featured guest of honour and 2010 Prize judge Jehan Sedat, moderator and international broadcaster Femi Oke and was accompanied by Mariane Pearl, Dalia Ziada, Professor Kimberlé Crenshaw and Dianne Laurance. It focused on the misuse of traditional, cultural, and religious dogmas that hinder opportunities for women.

There were two Freedom to Create Forums held in 2011. The first was held in New York, featuring a discussion on female entrepreneurship and empowerment in developing countries. The panel featured Mary Ellen Iskenderian, Francine LeFrak, Lauren Bush, and moderator Femi Oke. The second Forum was held in Cape Town, featuring women who have challenged structures keeping women vulnerable in their communities. The panel included keynote speaker Graça Machel, panelists Unity Dow, Chouchou Namegabe, and Molly Melching, and moderator Gcina Mhlophe.

== Sources ==
Freedom to Create Prize 2009 winner's announcement:

- Iranian director, opposition campaigner wins award 'Reuters'
- Iran should face smarter sanctions, says Mohsen Makhmalbaf 'The Guardian'
- Iranian filmmaker collects prize 'Channel4'
- Iranian filmmaker collects prize 'Telegraph'
- Mohsen Makhmalbaf 'Al Jazeera'
- Makhmalbaf: back democracy in Iran 'The Guardian'

Freedom to Create Prize 2009 shortlisted artists' announcement:

- Iran director, Saharan singer up for prize 'Saudi Gazette'
- Iranian Director amongst the nominees for Freedom to Create Prize 'Yahoo Entretenimiento'
- Freedom to Create Prize Announces Finalists 'Payvand.com'
- Iranian Director amongst the nominees for Freedom to Create Prize 'International Business Times'
