= Liu Jianqiang =

Liu Jianqiang (Jianqiang Liu) is a Chinese investigative reporter, an environmentalist and non-fiction writer.

== Biography ==
Liu Jianqiang is currently a visiting scholar at UC Berkeley in California. He also works as columnist and associate editor for the influential web-based news service: chinadialogue.net

Liu was a senior investigative reporter for 南方周末 (Southern Weekly), considered to be China's most influential investigative newspaper. He provided front-line and in-depth coverage of the burgeoning Chinese environmental movement. He was the first one to discover and claim that China's emerging environmental movement is a new democratic movement. See Liu's article about environmental movement online here

Some of Liu's most powerful articles include his September 2004 exposé on the controversial Tiger Leaping Gorge dams in southern Yunnan province--TIGER LEAPING GORGE UNDER THREAT. When Prime Minister Wen Jiabao read this article, he suspended the dam project and ordered an investigation by the Chinese government. His December 2004 piece on genetically modified rice ignited a central government crackdown on the illegally produced foodstuffs. His March 2005 article on the controversial Summer Palace Lake Reconstruction Project led the State Environmental Protection Administration to hold China's first ever state-level public environmental hearing.

He was featured in an exposé in The Wall Street Journal in December 2006 on the rise of Chinese investigative journalism--China's Reporters Face a Backlash Over Investigations The WSJ's article on Liu is online here

Liu Jianqiang was profiled in the book China Ink:The Changing Face Of Chinese Journalism

Liu has worked and traveled extensively in Tibetan regions. His book 天珠 － 藏人传奇 (The Tibetan Beads) was recently published in Hong Kong in July 2009. AsiaWeek(亚洲周刊）book review said: "If I were to recommend one book to know the true Tibet, 'The Tibetan Beads' is the first choice."
