= Amakhosi Theatre =

Zimbabwean theatre company

- Formation: 1981
- Type: Theatre group
- Purpose: Theatre
- Location: Makokoba township, Bulawayo, Zimbabwe
- Artistic director: Cont Mhlanga

Amakhosi Theatre Productions (also known as Amakhosi Academy of Performing Arts) is a Zimbabwean theatre company based at the Amakhosi Township Square Cultural Centre in Makokoba township, Bulawayo. The company was established under its current name in 1981 by Cont Mhlanga, and has since become an influential cultural institution in Zimbabwe, playing a role not only in stimulating the performance arts scene, but also in examining critical issues in politics, health, women's rights and development with urban and rural communities through a method of active audience engagement.

== Origins and development ==
The group's origins go back to 1979 when Mhlanga and his Dragons Karate Club colleagues turned up one day for their training session at Makokoba's Stanley Hall and found the hall booked for a theatre workshop. The karate club members attended the workshop out of curiosity, and it was during this experience that their enthusiasm for theatre was first ignited. Cont Mhlanga began to attend theatre workshops in Bulawayo and Harare in 1980 and 1981 (in the newly independent Zimbabwe), from which he would return to share newly acquired skills with his karate club. In 1981, the Dragons Karate Club officially renamed itself "Amakhosi Productions".

The performers became highly active in the township of Makokoba and beyond. By 1990 the group had performed 295 times on stage, and grown to 110 active members. Initially Cont Mhlanga was the sole writer, director and producer of all the plays. However, later other Amakhosi playwrights, such as Cont's brother Styx Mhlanga, were to make contributions to the company's extensive repertoire, while the company expanded and diversified.

== Historical and cultural context ==
Amakhosi was founded within a unique historical and cultural context. Prior to Zimbabwe's 1980 attainment of political independence, Rhodesian cultural and social life was polarised.

The Senior Drama Lecturer at the University of Zimbabwe, Owen Seda, notes that "as a conquest society, colonial Rhodesia was in dire need of legitimacy in its values and existence as a domineering settler society…Through theatre and other arts, western civilisation was contrasted with the lives of indigenous people who were regarded as uncivilised and without a culture."

It was inevitable that after independence this segregation of Zimbabwean theatre would continue. Indeed, for the first decade following Zimbabwe's independence in 1980, the National Theatre Organisation (a colonial establishment) continued its support of exclusive white amateur theatre companies. In this context, Amakhosi emerged as a strand of revolutionary black nationalist theatre, critical not only of colonialism, but also of the post-independence leadership which it characterised as hypocritical and corrupt.

The Zimbabwe Association of Community based Theatres (ZATC), established six years after independence, promoted indigenous township theatre, with the aim of encouraging cultural equality. However, black and white theatre traditions remained confrontational throughout the 1980s. At the onset of the 1990s, the attempts by various cultural activists (such as Cont Mhlanga) to break racial divisions in the arts resulted in a "process of transculturalism and hybridity in post-independence Zimbabwean theatre; leading to production of plays that resonate with traditional forms of African theatre infused with elements of western drama…(producing) theatre works of outstanding cultural and artistic merit."

In the play Workshop Negative (see below) in 1986, Amakhosi showed its willingness from early on to collaborate across the divide (in this case with Chris Hurst, a white Zimbabwean actor from the exclusive white theatre tradition.)

== Productions ==
Cont Mhlanga has been described by theatre expert Jane Plastow as "a product of urban township life", in contrast to many other African playwrights who hail from the elite classes.

Mhlanga's first plays – Children Children (1983), Book of Lies (1983) and Diamond Warriors (1983) – were performed in English, with little dialogue and extensive use of karate. Their themes were political – about colonisation, the theft of Africa's cultural heritage and its natural wealth. Ngizozula Lawe (1984) was the first play in isiNdebele, the local language of Matabeleland, and was consequently a breakthrough for Amakhosi. It involved elderly dancers from the Bulawayo Traditional Dancers' Association, whose participation in the performance, according to Professor Caleb Dube, "legitimised Amakhosi's existence".

The theatre group had an agenda, as Mhlanga recounts: "The intention was to make the group known in Makokoba, make it a local institution…We wanted what we did to be of significance to a local audience, and they should be able to recognise themselves in what we were doing. So the lines in the plays were to a large extent based on what I heard people saying and the way they talked, in the workplace, in bars and so on."

Having captured the attention and admiration of the Makokoba people with Nansi Lendoda in 1985, which won five National Theatre Organization awards, the theatre group expanded beyond the township.

From 1985 the actors began to engage their audiences in "discussion theatre", often entering into controversial social, political and cultural topic areas.

One such "discussion theatre" performance – Workshop Negative (1986) – which the group had wanted to take on tour in Botswana and Zambia, was cut short as it did not receive "the Government's blessing", due to its highly critical portrayal of the country's leaders as hypocritical and corrupt. The controversial banning of the play, and the implications this had for other artists' freedom of expression, caused a deep sense of unease in the arts community. The Writers' Union saw the episode as a fundamental challenge to free speech, and it was to signify just the beginning of Amakhosi's many issues with oppressive authorities.

Citizen Mind, produced in 1986, urged a revitalisation of Zimbabwean traditional cultures, arguing that they should be the basis for future development. Cry-Isilio (1987/88) dealt with the capitalist system and its perpetual repression of workers, as well as sexual harassment of under-privileged women. "Stitsha" (1990) dealt with many serious issues of crime, unemployment, corruption, and the suppression of women. The play was taken on a European tour in 1990.

In 1990 the company branched out to radio with Ngokwako Sgadula (a popular serial about family planning), and TV with Tshada Laye, a screen play about marriage and divorce (13 episodes).

Many plays and European tours followed in the 1990s. Several Amakhosi dancers and actors, such as Alois Moyo, have risen to prominence in the Zimbabwean theatre scene, or have headed abroad to advance their careers in South Africa and Europe. Zimbabwe's significant political and economic upheaval since 1999 has created serious setbacks for the theatre, both financially, and in the stifling of free expression. Cont Mhlanga has won several awards for his work, including the Freedom to Create Prize in 2008, for "practising protest theatre and challenging state ideologies in Zimbabwe for over 25 years. He has been the target of state surveillance, intimidation, harassment, arrest and detention."

== Social change and development projects ==
Amakhosi Theatre has initiated several projects and collaborations with African and European organisations, and received vital funding support for its activities, mainly from Scandinavia, through NGOs such as NORAD, DANIDA and HiVOS. Its main venue, the Amakhosi Township Square Cultural Centre, with its offices, library, practice rooms, bar and open air stage, is a cultural hub hosting performances, concerts, dance and theatre workshops.

For much of the decade since the year 2000, Amakhosi Productions has lacked sufficient funding and revenue to support the level of activity that it was previously able to sustain. However, at a new alternative venue in 2011, in Bulawayo City centre - the Amakhosi Elite 400 (already described as "Zimbabwe's premiere arts and culture hub") - the company has attempted to revive its activities and host a diverse array of performance events.

=== Voices From Zimbabwe ===
Voices From Zimbabwe began with a statement by Cont Mhlanga from the Amakhosi Theatre in 2007, announcing the launch of a movement to "support creative artists from all disciplines to produce, perform, distribute and amplify the voices of the majority who live in Difficult Times while exposing the trickery and hypocrisy of the minority who live in Good Times, while they claim to be acting on behalf of the people and the country, by taking such critical and sometimes protest works to the people by all means available and possible."

=== Amakhosi Theatre for Community Action (TCA) ===
Established in 2001, this programme, uses a particular methodology created by the Amakhosi Theatre to "support and involve rural community members in the fight against HIV/AIDS" through the effective use of drama. It incorporates folk media like song, dance and narrative with spontaneous participation, to communicate the issue of the HIV/AIDS pandemic. (In interviews Mhlanga emphasises that theatre is a part of people's everyday activity, and in the African context it must diverge in some sense from the Western notion of theatre.) The initial TCA practical theatre skills training programme lasted 1 year and taught the TCA methodology to 7 districts in Matabeleland province, which resulted in plays being performed to 80 000 people. The organizers stated that "community theatre can take the message to the people, instead of getting people to the theatre". Amakhosi's TCA development methodology is continuing to be implemented by Amakhosi in Zimbabwe, and other development groups elsewhere in Africa. The Theatre has received substantial funding from the Canadian International Development Agency (CIDA) for "addressing HIV/AIDS and Promoting Gender Equality through Music and Theatre."

=== Secondary school drama ===
Meanwhile, Styx Mhlanga continues to implement a new project in Matabeleland, teaching secondary school literature texts to students by working with them on theatrical adaptations.
