= Makokoba =

Suburb of Bulawayo, Zimbabwe

Coordinates: 20°09′S 28°35′E

Makokoba also spelled Makhokhoba is a suburb of Bulawayo, Zimbabwe. It was the first black African township in the city.

The suburb is named after the actions of Mr Fallon, the Native Commissioner, who used walk around with a stick. The name comes from the word "ukukhokhoba" which in the local Ndebele language means "bending and walking with a stick'. It was referring to Mr Fallon as "the little old man who walks with a stick". The word actually describes the noise of the stick hitting the ground or the doors.

Association footballers Adam, Madinda and Peter Ndlovu come from Makokoba, as do music, arts, dance and theatre group Amakhosi Theatre and dance and theatre group Siyaya.

After independence the first councillor of the township was Nicholas Joel Mabodoko of ZAPU and the first member of parliament for the constituency was Sidney Malunga of Zapu.
