= Haba Snow Mountain =

Mountain in Yunnan, China

Haba Xueshan
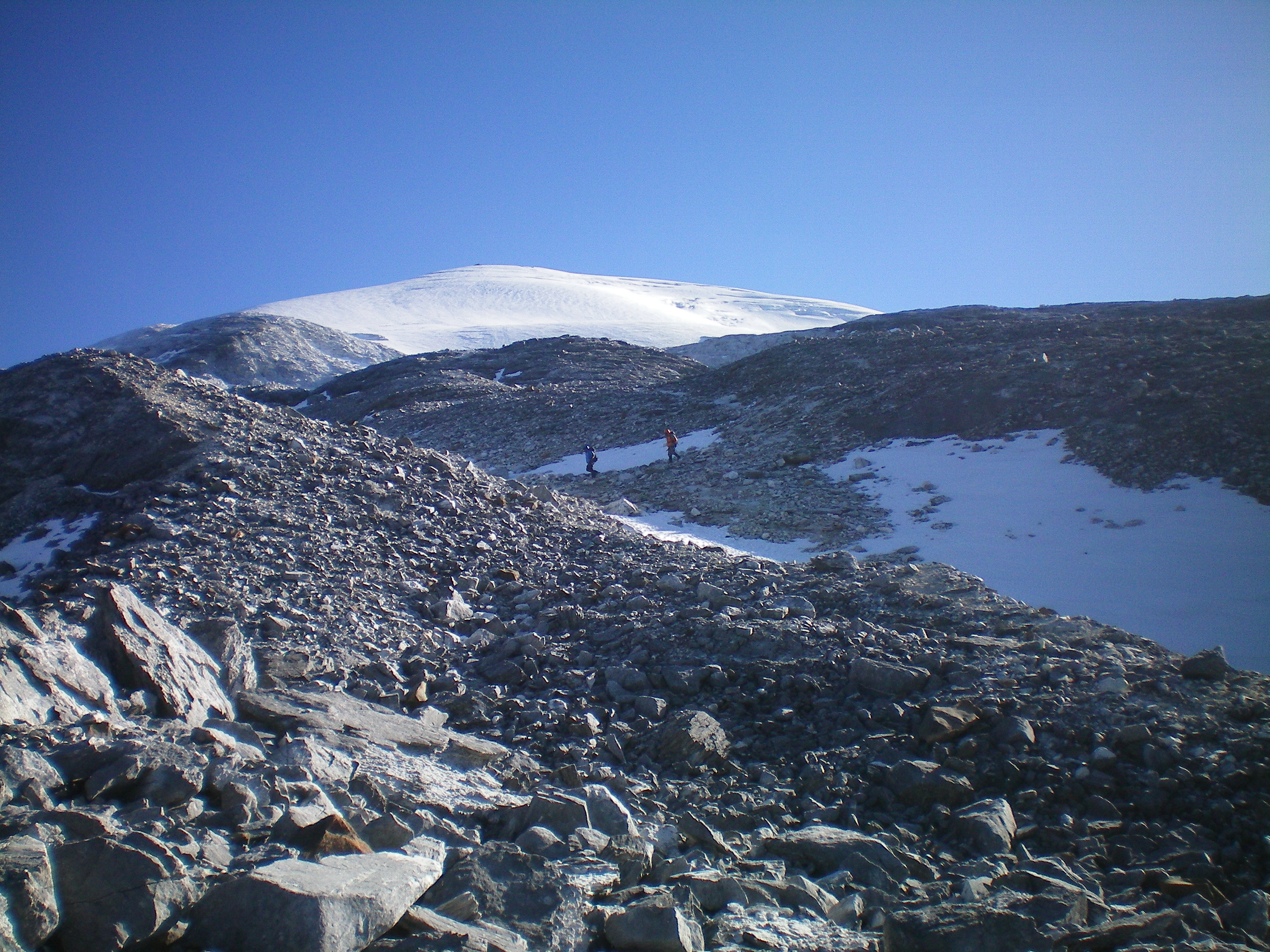

Highest point
- Elevation: 5,396 m (17,703 ft)
- Prominence: 1,794 m (5,886 ft)
- Listing: Mountains of China and Ultra
- Coordinates: 27°19′06″N 100°06′00″E

Geography
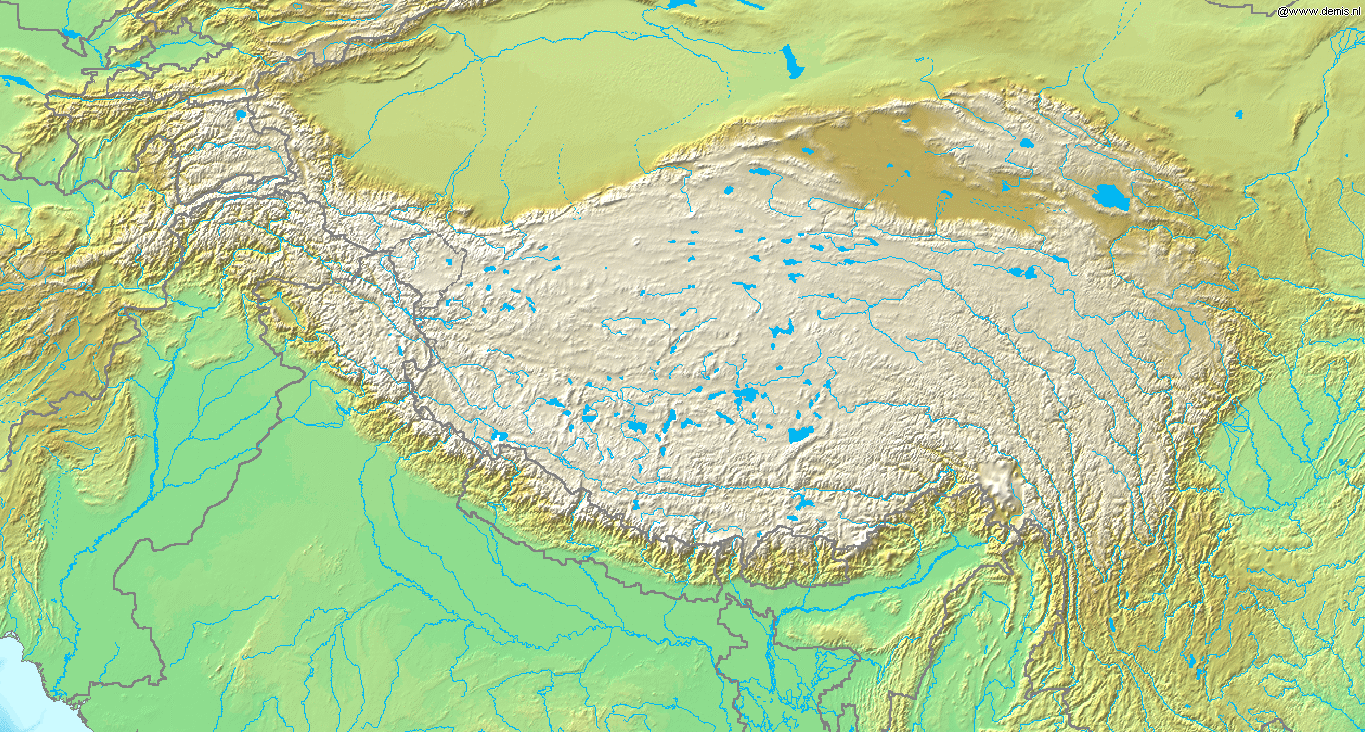
- Location within Tibetan Plateau
- Location: Shangri-La, Yunnan, China
- Parent range: Hengduan Mountains

Climbing
- First ascent: 1995 by a Chinese party

Haba Snow Mountain (Chinese: 哈巴雪山; pinyin: Hābā Xǔeshān; Wade–Giles: Ha-pa hsüeh-shan; lit. 'Haba Snow Mountain') is a mountain rising above the northwest side of Tiger Leaping Gorge in Yunnan, China. It rises opposite the higher Yulong Xueshan, and towers 3,500 metres above the upper reaches of the Yangtze River, also known as the Jinsha River. The summit of the mountain is a popular destination for amateur mountaineers and its lowest slopes are crossed by the popular Tiger Leaping Gorge trail.

The Haba Snow Mountain massif is considered the southernmost extent of the expansive Shaluli Mountains, themselves a component range of the Hengduan Mountains.

== See also ==
- Three Parallel Rivers of Yunnan Protected Areas - Unesco World Heritage Site
- List of ultras of Tibet, East Asia and neighbouring areas
