= Tiger Leaping Gorge =

River canyon in China

Coordinates: 27°14′N 100°08′E

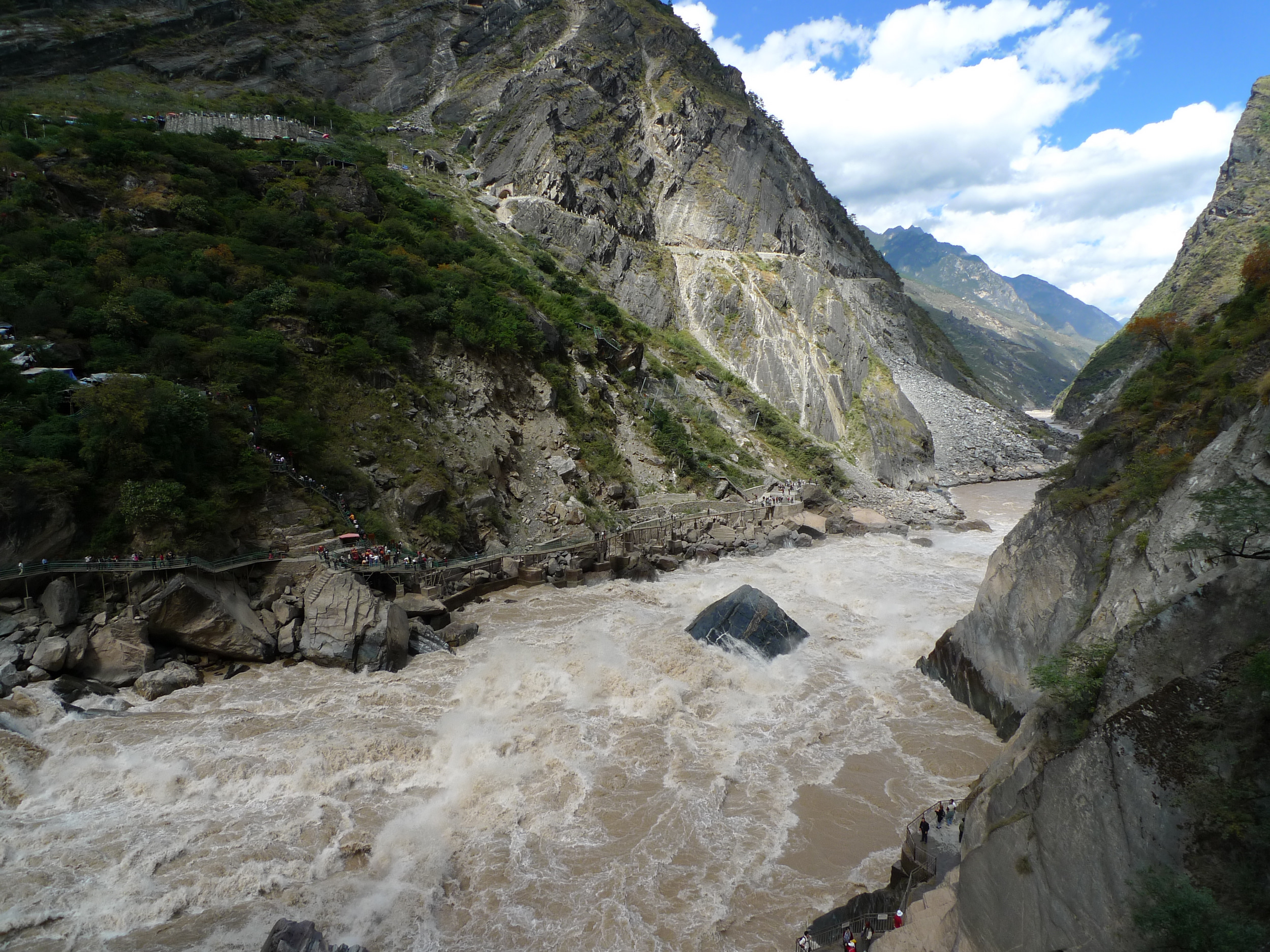
- Tiger Leaping Gorge
- Simplified Chinese: 虎跳峡
- Traditional Chinese: 虎跳峽
Transcriptions
Standard Mandarin
- Hanyu Pinyin: Hǔ tiào xiá
- IPA: [xù tʰjâʊ ɕjǎ]
Yue: Cantonese
- Yale Romanization: Fú tiu haahp
- Jyutping: Fu2 tiu3 haap6
- IPA: [fu˧˥ tʰiw˧ hap̚˨]
Southern Min
- Tâi-lô: Hóo thiàu kiap

Tiger Leaping Gorge (Chinese: 虎跳峡; pinyin: Hǔ tiào xiá) is a scenic canyon on the Jinsha River, a primary tributary of the upper Yangtze River. It is located 60 kilometres (37 mi) north of Lijiang City, Yunnan in southwestern China. It is part of the Three Parallel Rivers of Yunnan Protected Areas World Heritage Site.

Legend says the name comes from a hunted tiger escaping by jumping across the river at the narrowest point (still 25 metres (82 ft) wide), using the rock in the middle.

At a maximum depth of approximately 3,790 meters (12,430 feet) from river to mountain peak, Tiger Leaping Gorge is one of the deepest river canyons in the world. The inhabitants of the gorge are primarily the indigenous Nakhi people, who live in a handful of small hamlets. Their primary subsistence comes from grain production and nowadays hiking tourism.

== Geography ==
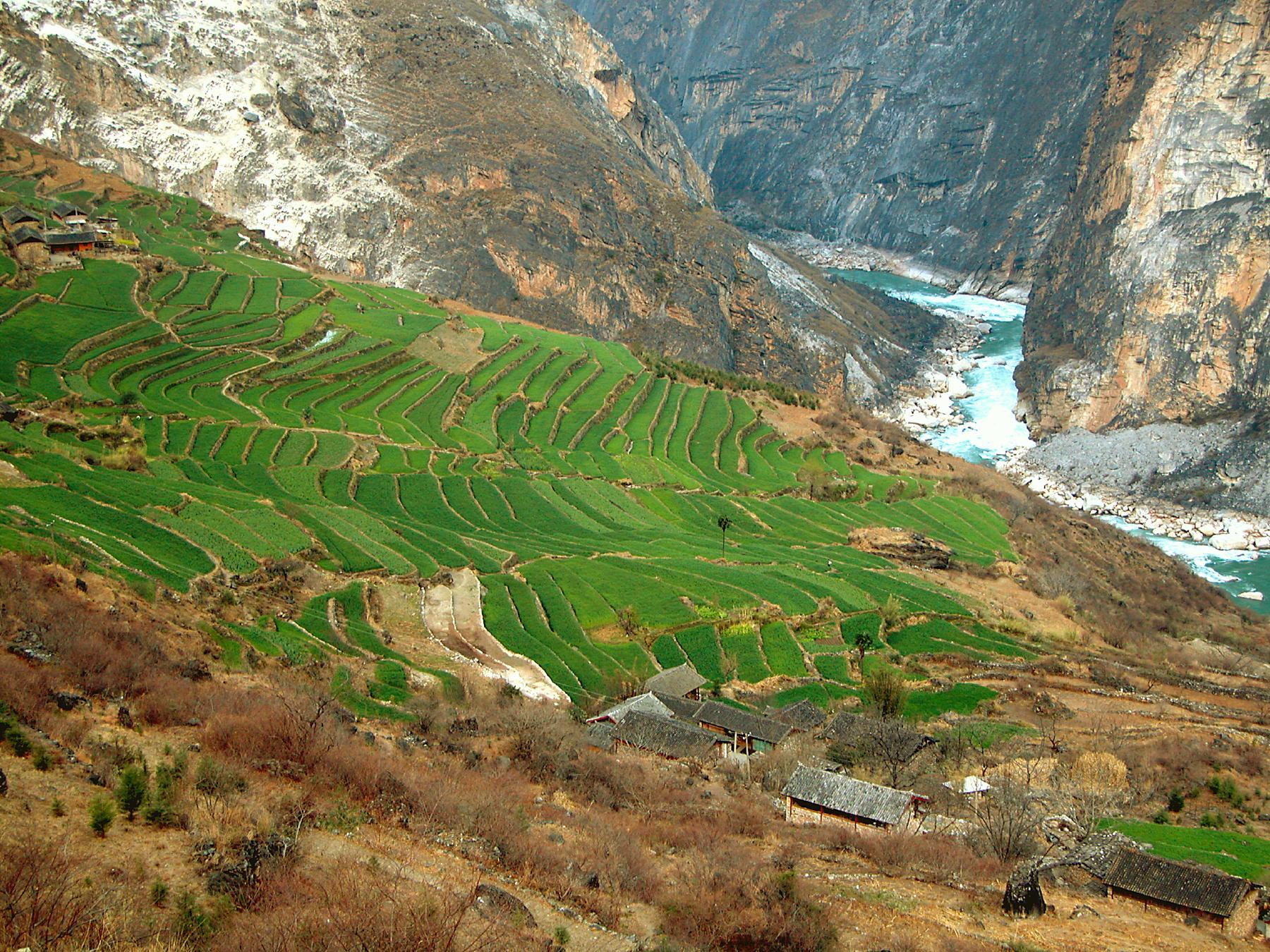
Terraces partway up the sides of the Tiger Leaping Gorge

Around 15 kilometres (9.3 mi) in length, the gorge is located where the river passes between the 5,596 metres (18,360 ft) Jade Dragon Snow Mountain and the 5,396 metres (17,703 ft) Haba Snow Mountain in a series of rapids under steep 2,000 metres (6,600 ft) cliffs.

Administratively, the river in this area forms the border between Yulong Naxi Autonomous County of Lijiang City (right bank) and Shangri-La County of Dêqên Tibetan Autonomous Prefecture (left bank).

The gorge is not considered navigable. In the early 1980s, four rafters attempted to go down the gorge and were never seen again. In 1986, the first known successful attempt to sail through the gorge was made by the first expedition to float down the entire length of the Yangtze, starting at the river's high source at the Gelandandong glacier lake.

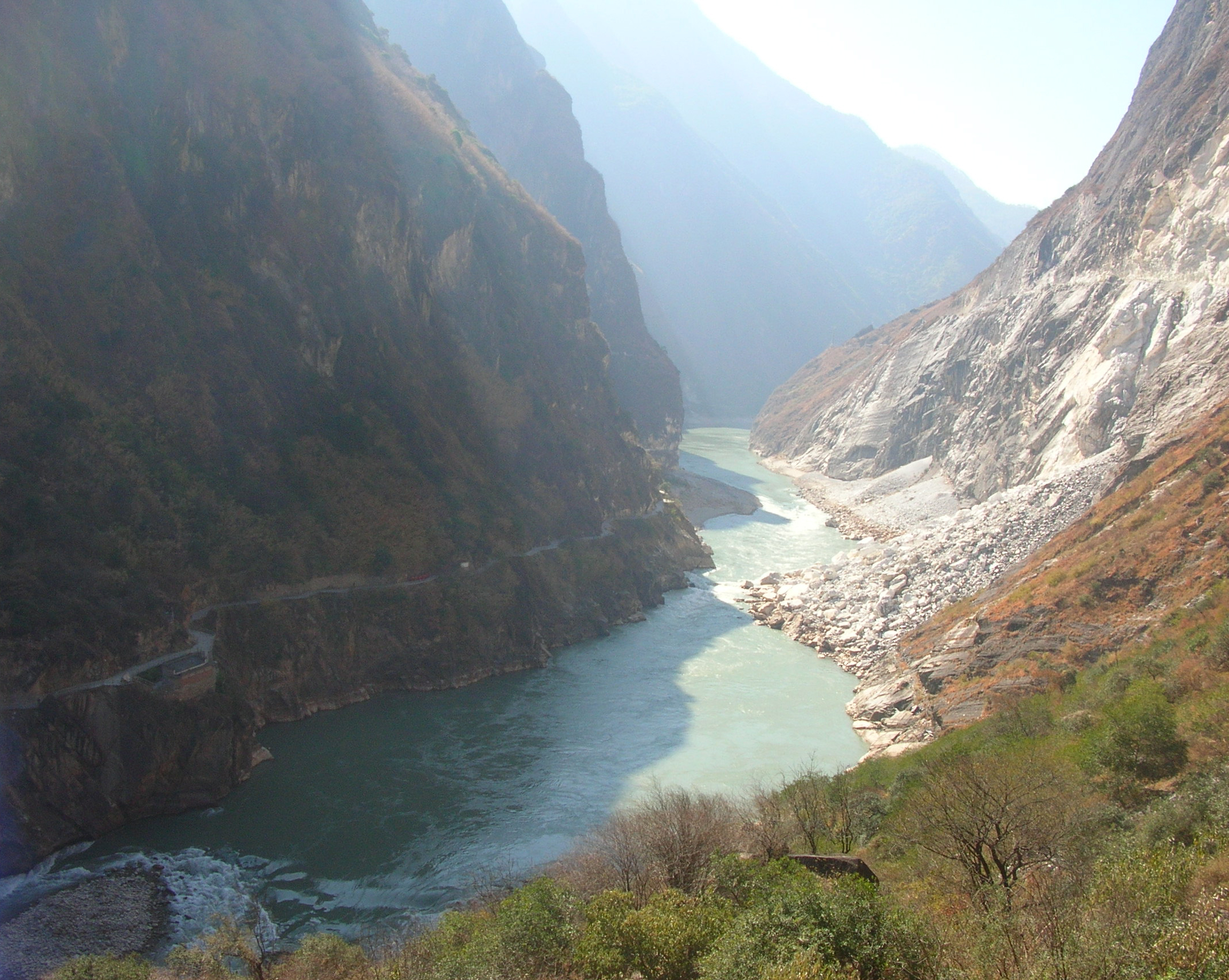
A closeup view of the gorge

The area was officially opened to foreign tourists in 1993, but had already attracted adventurous backpackers in the 1980s. Officials plan to improve the existing trails and roads, bringing tour buses and more development. These plans arouse highly varied reactions among the local population, from strong opposition to strong support.

Natural crystals are mined from areas in and surrounding the Tiger Leaping Gorge.

== Climate ==
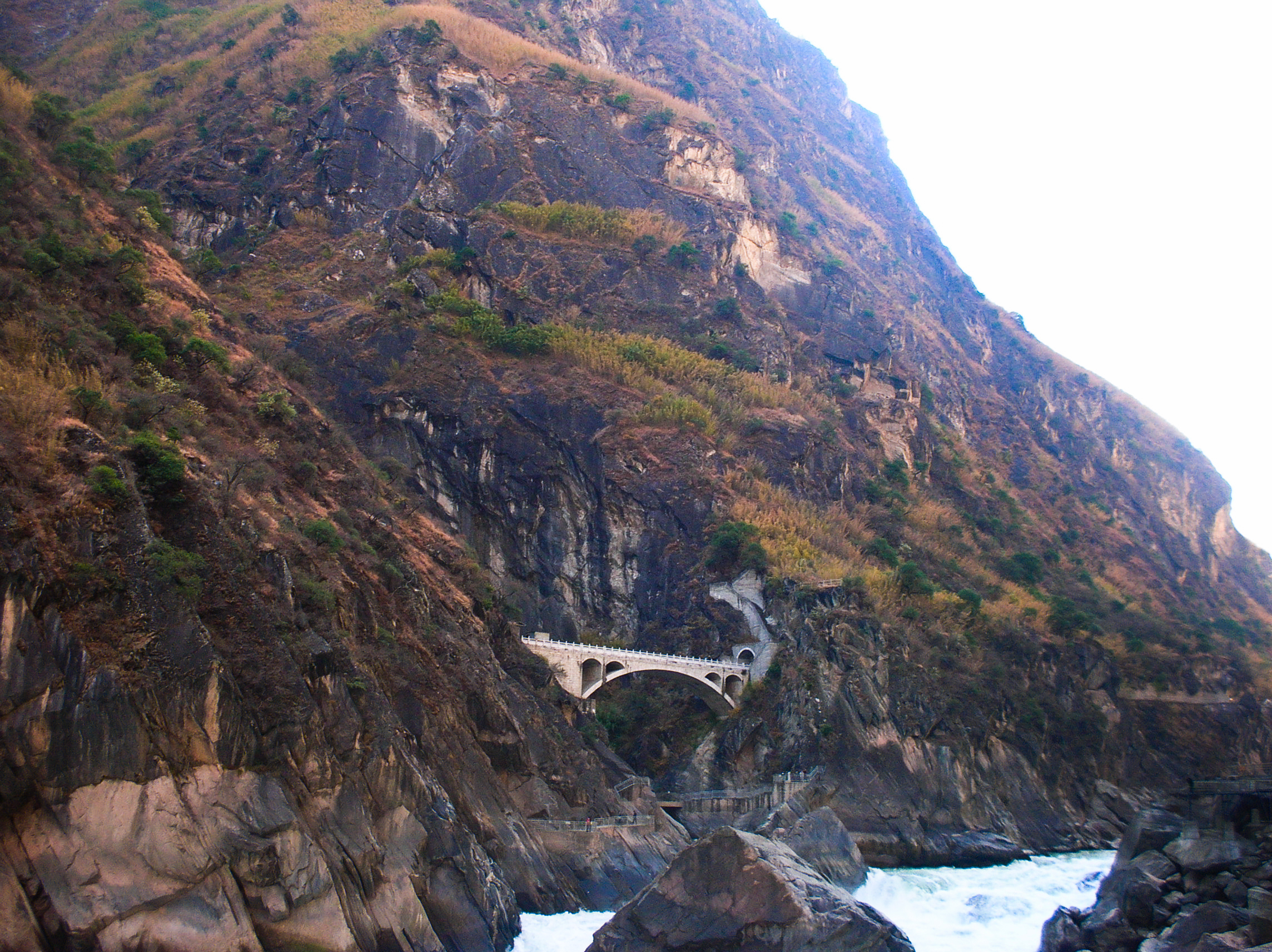
A bridge opposite the gorge

Tiger Leaping Gorge weather is generally mild, with abundant rainfall and plenty of sunshine. It has an average annual temperature between 13 and 20 °C (55 and 68 °F), without too much change from spring to winter. In summer, the temperature just falls between 10–26 °C (50–79 °F) low because of the continuous rain. Coming to winter, the high mountains block the cold air from northern China, so it is still as warm as spring for most of the days.

Climate data for Tiger Leaping Gorge
Month	Jan	Feb	Mar	Apr	May	Jun	Jul	Aug	Sep	Oct	Nov	Dec	Year
Mean daily maximum °C (°F)	16.2 (61.2)	17.4 (63.3)	20.6 (69.1)	23.3 (73.9)	26.1 (79.0)	26.2 (79.2)	26.2 (79.2)	26.0 (78.8)	24.8 (76.6)	22.6 (72.7)	19.6 (67.3)	16.8 (62.2)	22.1 (71.9)
Daily mean °C (°F)	9.2 (48.6)	10.9 (51.6)	13.8 (56.8)	16.9 (62.4)	20.0 (68.0)	21.4 (70.5)	21.8 (71.2)	21.4 (70.5)	20.2 (68.4)	17.1 (62.8)	13.0 (55.4)	9.9 (49.8)	16.3 (61.3)
Mean daily minimum °C (°F)	2.2 (36.0)	4.4 (39.9)	7.1 (44.8)	10.5 (50.9)	14.0 (57.2)	16.7 (62.1)	17.5 (63.5)	16.8 (62.2)	15.6 (60.1)	11.7 (53.1)	6.4 (43.5)	3.0 (37.4)	10.5 (50.9)
Average precipitation mm (inches)	8 (0.3)	22 (0.9)	39 (1.5)	48 (1.9)	68 (2.7)	175 (6.9)	201 (7.9)	175 (6.9)	133 (5.2)	83 (3.3)	18 (0.7)	8 (0.3)	978 (38.5)
Source: Climate-Data.org

== Roads and trails ==
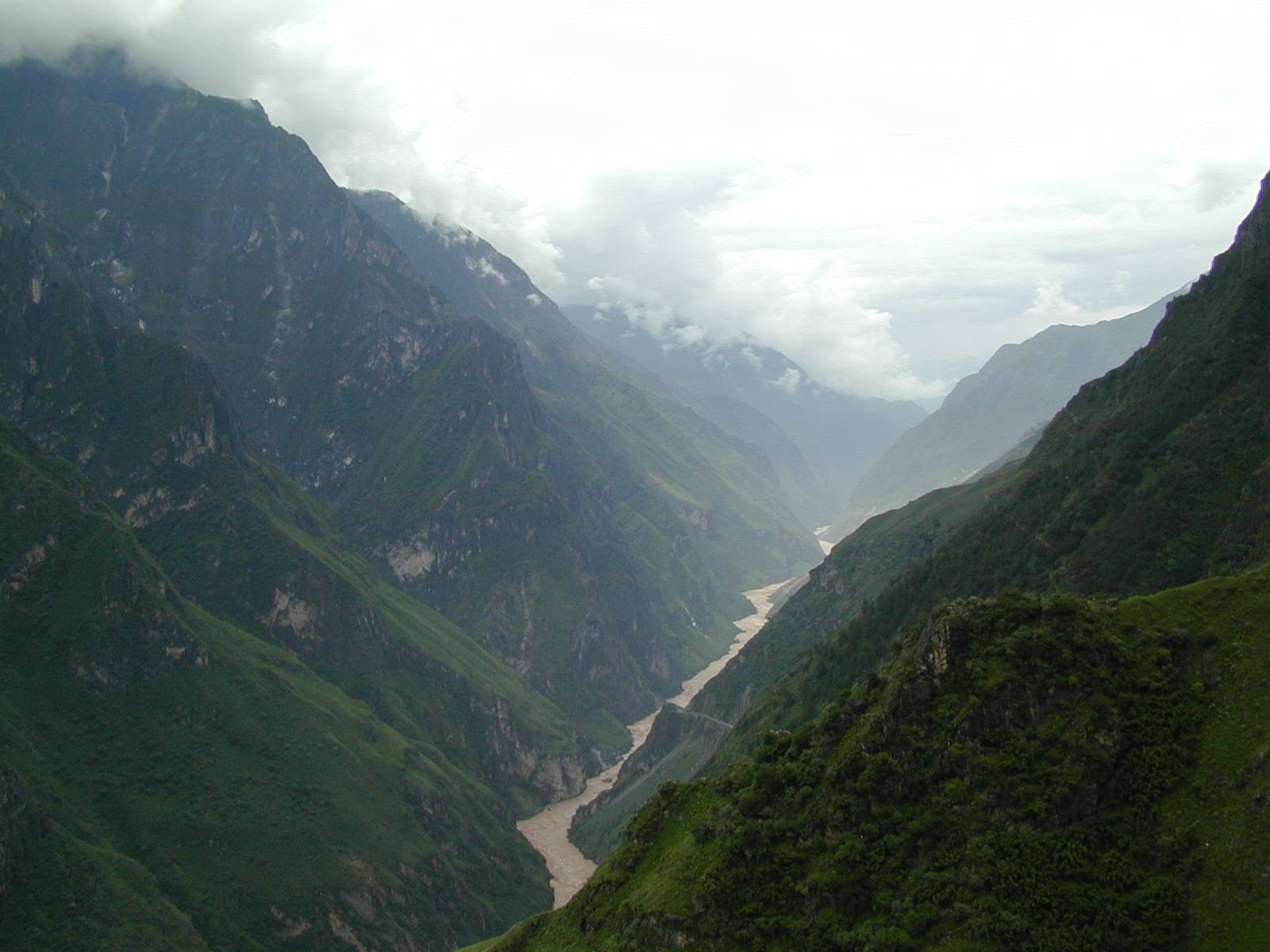
View of the gorge from the high path, showing Jade Dragon Snow Mountain on the left, and Haba Xueshan on the right

Hiking the length of the gorge is possible. The hiking path ("the high road") is well-maintained and marked, although sometimes narrow, and at times impassable due to heavy rains, and is used by the Naxi as part of everyday life. This trail is longer than the lower road, approximately 22 kilometres (14 mi), but is more varied. It features a variety of micro-ecosystems, waterfalls, and a fair number of guesthouses for trekkers. These guesthouses are not well heated, which combined with the unpredictable nature of high mountain weather makes this trek inadvisable during the rainy season.

The lower road, stretching about 195 km (121 mi) from Qiaotou through the Gorge, is a stretch of pavement (until recently a simple mule track) crossed by several waterfalls, and frequently beset by rockslides. Some portions of the road have been known to disappear into the river below. The road follows the Yangtze, so there are more views of the river, and a stronger sense of being in a gorge than on the upper trail. Where the high road descends to meet the lower road, one can climb down to the river near the Tiger Leaping Stone, the point at which the tiger is said to have leaped. In July 2010, the Chinese government closed the gorge to visitors because a new lower road was being built. Consequently, there were no government officials to charge the 50 yuan fee to enter the trail. Locals requested a 10 yuan fee to enter the trail. Many trekkers still hiked the high road in spite of its closure. Some buses continued to travel the low road, although landslides frequently caused travel delays.

== Environmental concerns ==
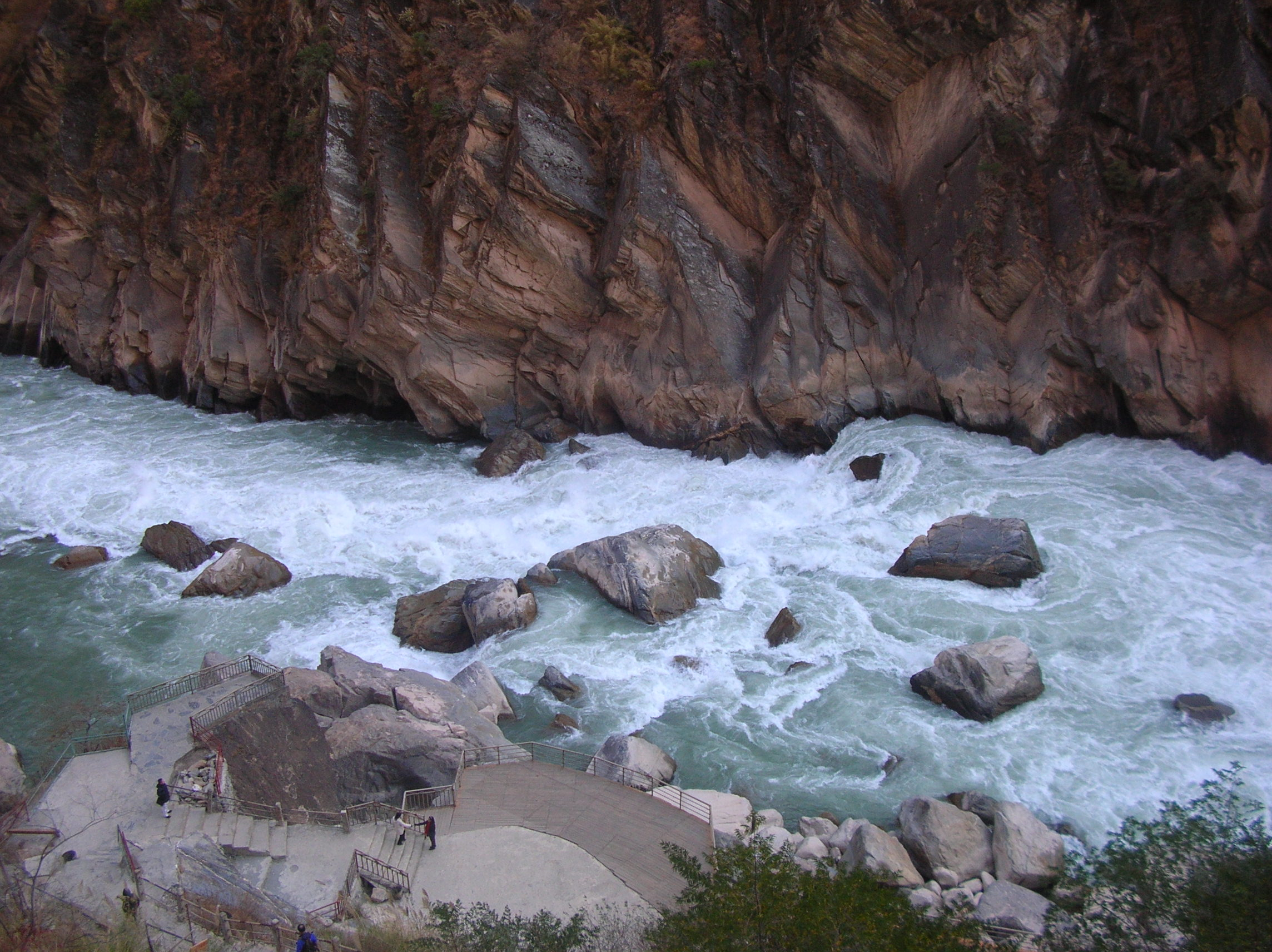
View of the gorge from above

Although Tiger Leaping Gorge is an essential part of the Three Parallel Rivers of Yunnan, a World Heritage Site since 2003, the Chinese government floated proposals for a hydroelectric dam on the Jinsha River in 2004. The Yunnan provincial government scrapped the project in 2007.

Details of the scrapped project follow: Construction had begun on the other 12 dams of the same project which lie just outside the boundaries of the heritage area, even though it had not been approved by the State Council. Media reports suggested that the Lijiang city government waived standard procedures in order to facilitate the project.

The project would displace up to 100,000 people to the north, mainly the Naxi minority, to a Tibetan area with harsh climate and unfamiliar crops as barley and potatoes as staples, virtually stop the flow of the upper Yangtze River, and irreparably alter the landscape of the Tiger Leaping Gorge. The project was abandoned in December 2007. This project was also related to the Three Gorges Dam and the South-North Water Transfer Project, which would cause massive environmental damage and the destruction of thousands of cultural sites.

== See also ==
- Black Dragon Pool
- Jade Dragon Snow Mountain
- Three Parallel Rivers of Yunnan Protected Areas
