= Cont Mhlanga =

Zimbabwean playwright and actor (died 2022)

- Born: Cont Mdladla Mhlanga; 1957/1958
- Died: 1 August 2022
- Occupations: playwright, actor, and theatre director
- Notable work: The Good President

Cont Mdladla Mhlanga (1957/1958 – 1 August 2022) was a Zimbabwean playwright, actor, and theatre director. He was also the founder and head of the Amakhosi Theatre Productions company, formed in 1982.

Mhlanga was a critic of the government of Robert Mugabe, and was arrested often for public expressions of his views. He, alongside Burmese satirist Zarganar and City of Rhyme – a 14-strong hip-hop group from northern Brazil, whose lyrics condemn violence – were winners of the inaugural Freedom to Create Prize in 2008.

== Works ==
=== Written ===
- The Good President
- The End
- Vikela
- Sinjalo
- Children On Fire
- Games and Bombs
- The Members

=== Directed ===
- Bamqgibela Ephila
- Omunye Umngcwabo
