= Salome MC =

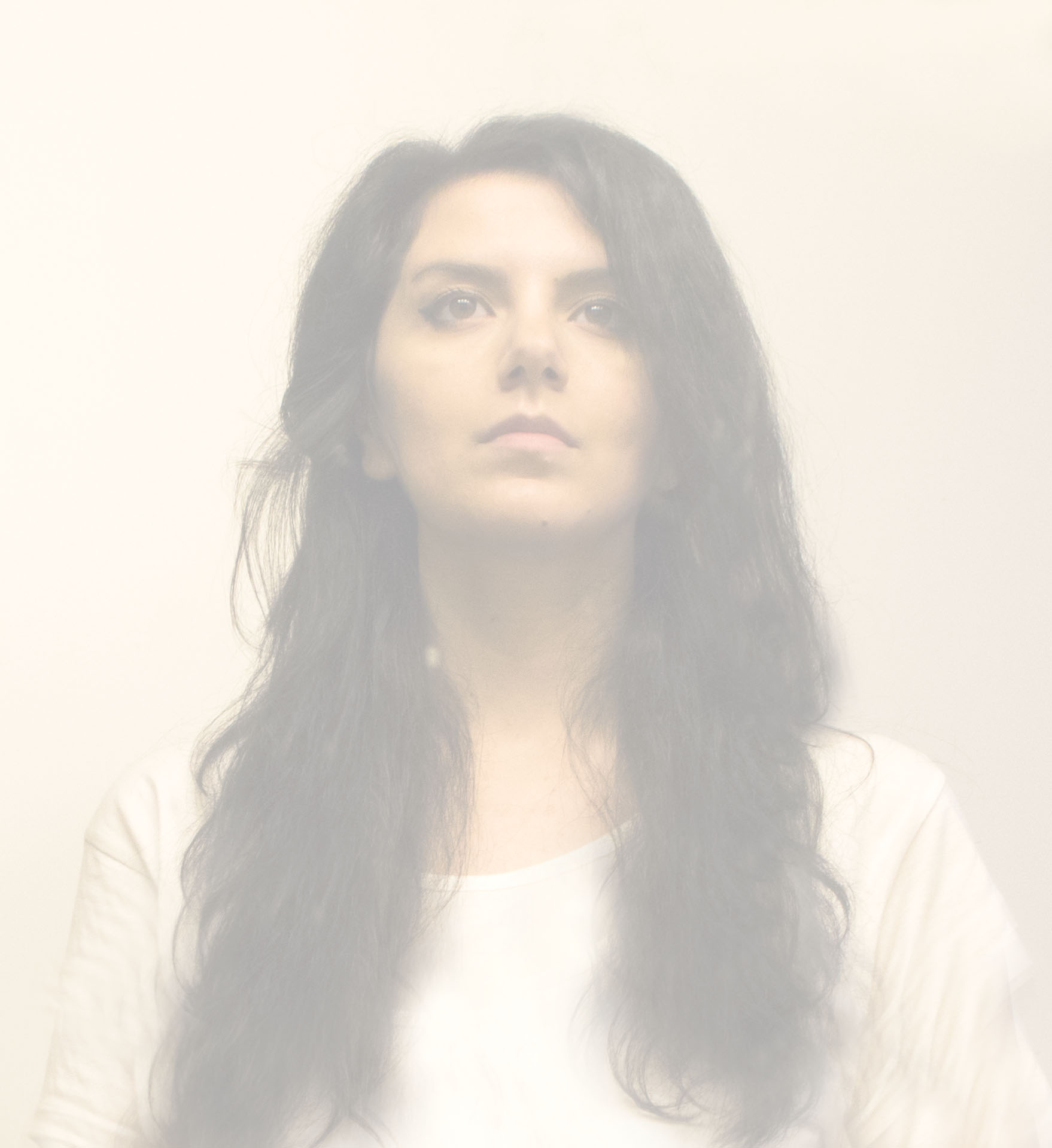

Background information
- Origin: Iran
- Genres: Hip hop, Trip hop, Video art, Multimedia art
- Occupations: Musician, activist, multimedia artist
- Years active: 2002 – present
- Website: http://www.salomemc.com

Salome MC (Persian: سالومه ام‌سی; born 1985) is an Iranian rapper, producer, antimilitarist activist and multimedia artist. Known as Iran's first female rapper, she has been recognized as one of the best non-English-speaking hip-hop artists by MTV and Time magazine listed her as one of the world's best rappers who are revolutionizing the world of rap. She is also a multimedia/video artist and her work has been featured in festivals, galleries and universities around the world, such as Venice Biennale and Yale University. In 2020, Salome founded "Seven Climes", a grassroots art and heritage project that presents the cultural and lingual diversity of the Iranian Hiphop scene.

== Activities ==
=== Music ===
Salome started rapping by collaborating with Hichkas, one of the currently prominent Iranian rappers, in 2002. With German-Iranian rapper Shirali, she released the collaboration album Delirium in 2006, and, in 2009, a mixtape called Paranoid Descent, which put her in the list of finalists for the Freedom to Create Prize in 2010. In 2013, she released I Officially Exist, the first hip-hop album by a female Iranian hip-hop artist, and its first music video, "Price of Freedom", was crowdfunded to be produced by Sahar Sarshar.

In 2015, Salome collaborated with Japanese rap artist Shing02 for a worldwide recording project called 1+1, and the resulting documentary, Passenger, was released in March 2016. She was also one of the participants in the remake project of Fela Kuti's album, Zombie, featuring Seun Kuti.

She announced her self-produced upcoming album Excerpts From Unhappy Consciousness (ناخوشاگاه) in 2016 and debuted the first song "Odium" (رسوا) at the Music Freedom Day festival 2016 in Norway. The music video for "Odium" was released in October 2016, followed by the second single from the album called "Callous". The album was released in August 2017 digitally, and consists of 8 tracks. In the summer of 2018, Salome released her self-directed music video for the last single from the album called "Riddle", while pregnant with her son. Her song "3" was published in the subsequent year along with a personal essay named "Anxiety, Alienation and Control" on an Iranian feminist website. A regular collaborator with artists from around the world, her 2020 release "Home" featuring Tunisian rapper Medusa TN debuted on KEXP Radio. Salome was featured in the 2024 Konceptualizer album as a co-producer of the song "Wasteland".

Salome founded "Seven Climes", a grassroots art and heritage project that presents the cultural and linguistic diversity of the Iranian Hip-hop scene and aims to connect the regional communities through their common passion for creating social change through rap music. The first result of the endeavor, "Seven Climes Vol. 1" was released in April 2021.

She received the 2009 female change maker and 2018 Artist Trust Fellowship awards.

=== Writing ===
In 2016, Salome MC wrote an article called "Another Face of Censorship" for Siamak Pourzand Foundation's website, in which she lamented the biased reporting of Western outlets about Middle Eastern women, White feminism and neocolonialism. She interviewed A1one, also known as Karen Reshad, the pioneer of street art in the Middle East for Kolah Studio website in May 2018. Another essay of hers named "Anxiety, Alienation and Control", in which she details her postpartum anxiety experience was published on, Bidarzani, an Iranian feminist website, in June 2019. A long personal Essay titled Reclaiming the Village Clown by Salome was published on the website of Museum of Human Achievement in 2025, as a part of a residency project.

=== Sound and video art ===
Salome MC started working as a sound and video art while getting her master's degree in audio/visual arts in Japan. Her work has been screened and exhibited at various festivals around the world, including Swatch's "Faces" exhibit at the 2015 Venice Biennale with her music video "Vacuum," which features Don Porcella. Her video art piece Concealment was one of the selected shorts to be screened at the Iranian Film Festival in Los Angeles, and her experimental documentary Three Rituals of Perdurance was among the chosen shorts at the Currents New Media Festival 2015 in Santa Fe.

=== Other activities ===
Salome is also known as the first female graffiti artist in Iran. However, she stopped writing graffiti in the early 2000s. She focused on her music. Salome organized art workshops for children who were affected by the 2011 tsunami in Japan, and started “Hip-Hop without Borders” as a music workshop for visually impaired youth of all ages in collaboration with WA department of Services for the Blind. A year later, inspired by her own struggles as a new immigrant to the U.S., she expanded the workshop’s reach to include ESL students in partnership with Jack Straw Cultural Center, exploring themes of identity, home, and language through the power of hip-hop music.

Salome has spoken and written against militarism and joined on the advisory board of Code Pink after moving to the U.S.

== Discography ==
=== Albums ===
- Seven Climes Vol. 2 (2023)
- Seven Climes Vol. 1 (2021)
- Excerpts From Unhappy Consciousness (2017)
- I Officially Exist (2013)
- Paranoid Descent (Mixtape) (2009)
- Delirium Featuring Shirali (2006)

=== Films ===
- Passenger - Music Documentary (2015)
- Three Rituals of Perdurance - Experimental Documentary (2014)

=== Select Art Shows/Screenings ===
- Reclaiming the Village Clown - Museum of Human Achievement (2025)
- Only Partially Here - Shoreline City Art Cottage (2023)
- From Silence to Exaltation - Activa Fest, Spain (2017)
- Seismographic Sounds - Visions of a New World - Touring exhibit (Aug 2015 - Feb 2017)
- Faces - 56th Venice Biennale (2015)
