= Yading =

Nature reserve in Sichuan, China

Coordinates: 28°22′01″N 100°13′48″E

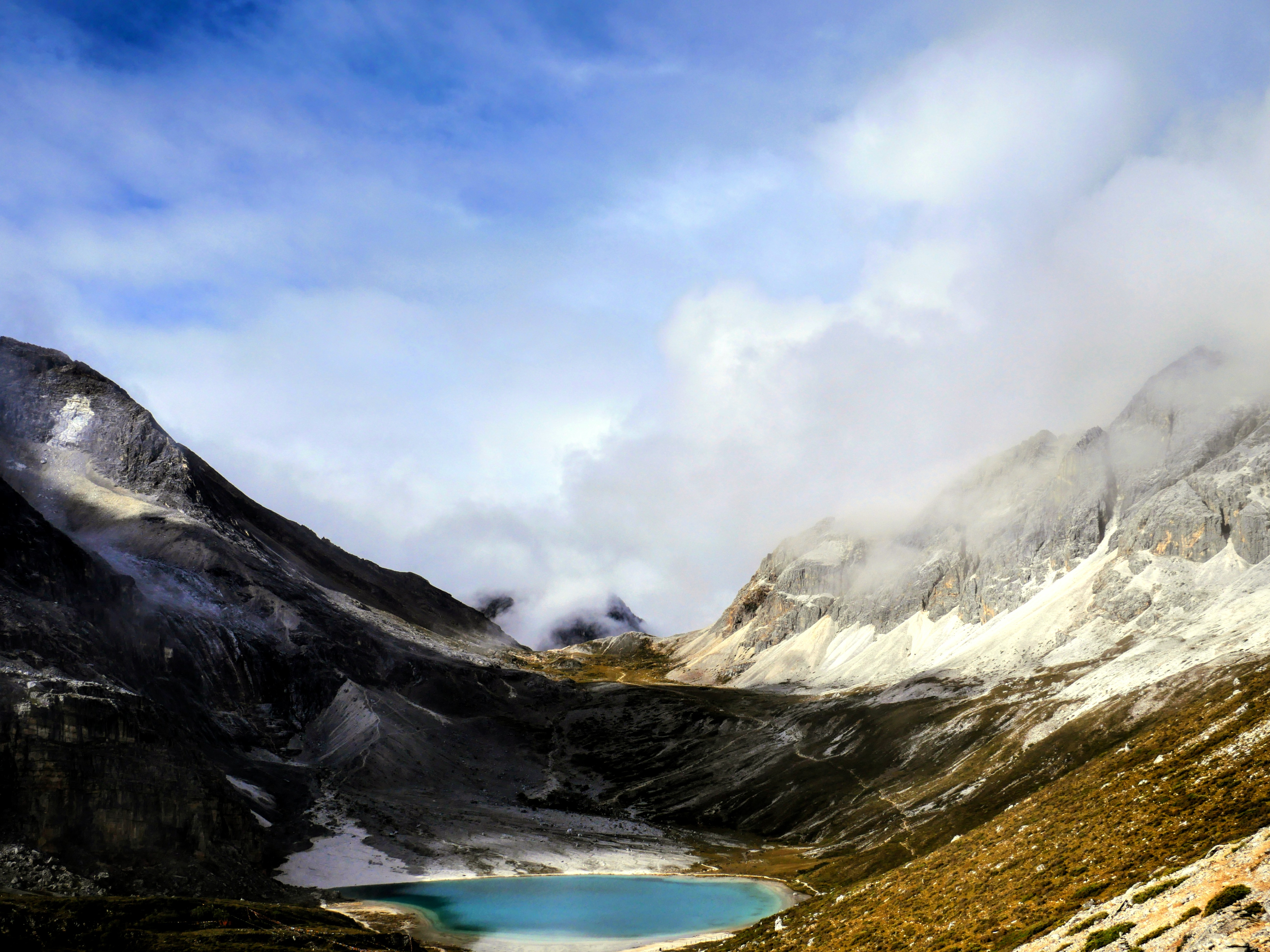
Panoramic view of the Milk Lake

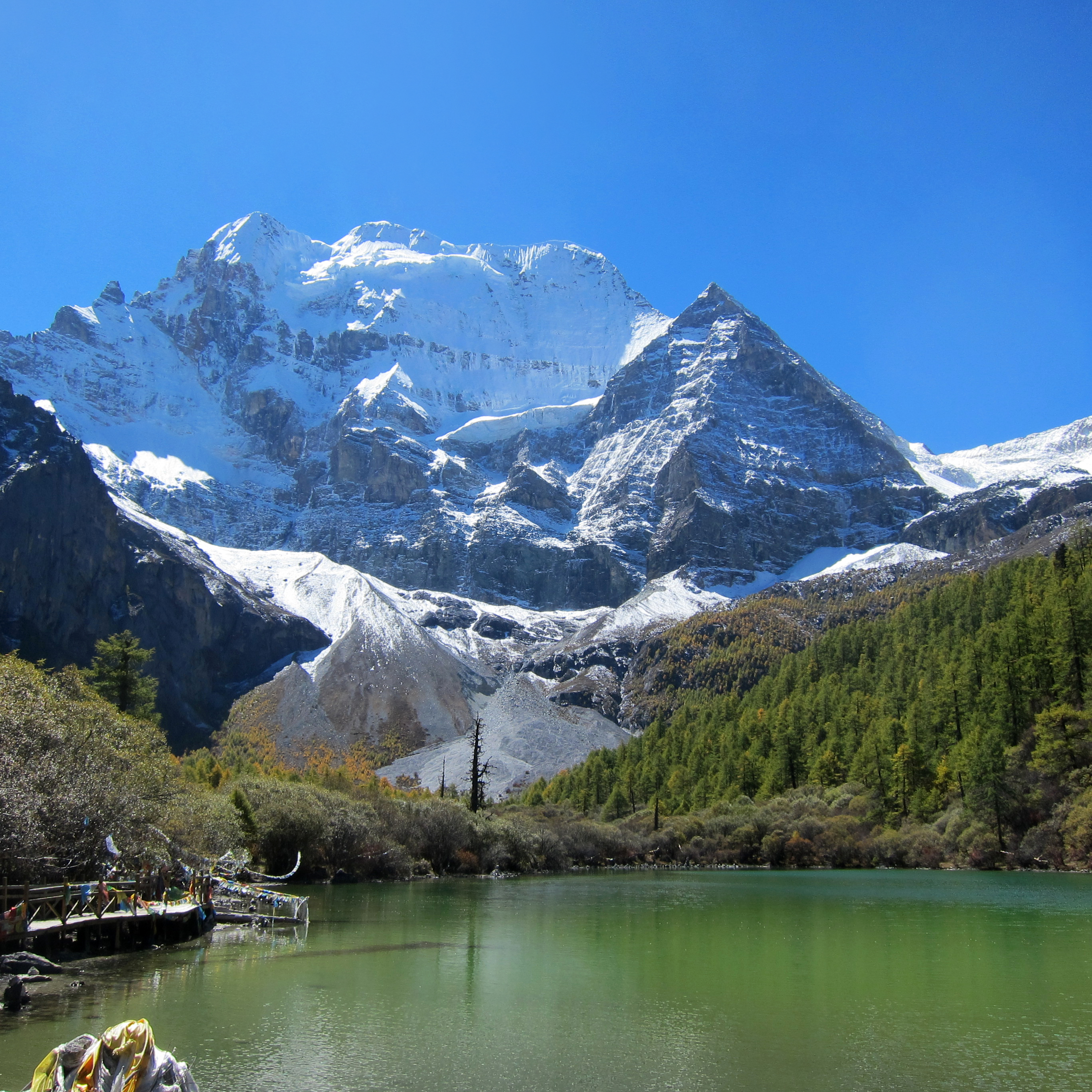
The sacred Mount Chenrezig (Xiannairi), seen from Yading Xin river.

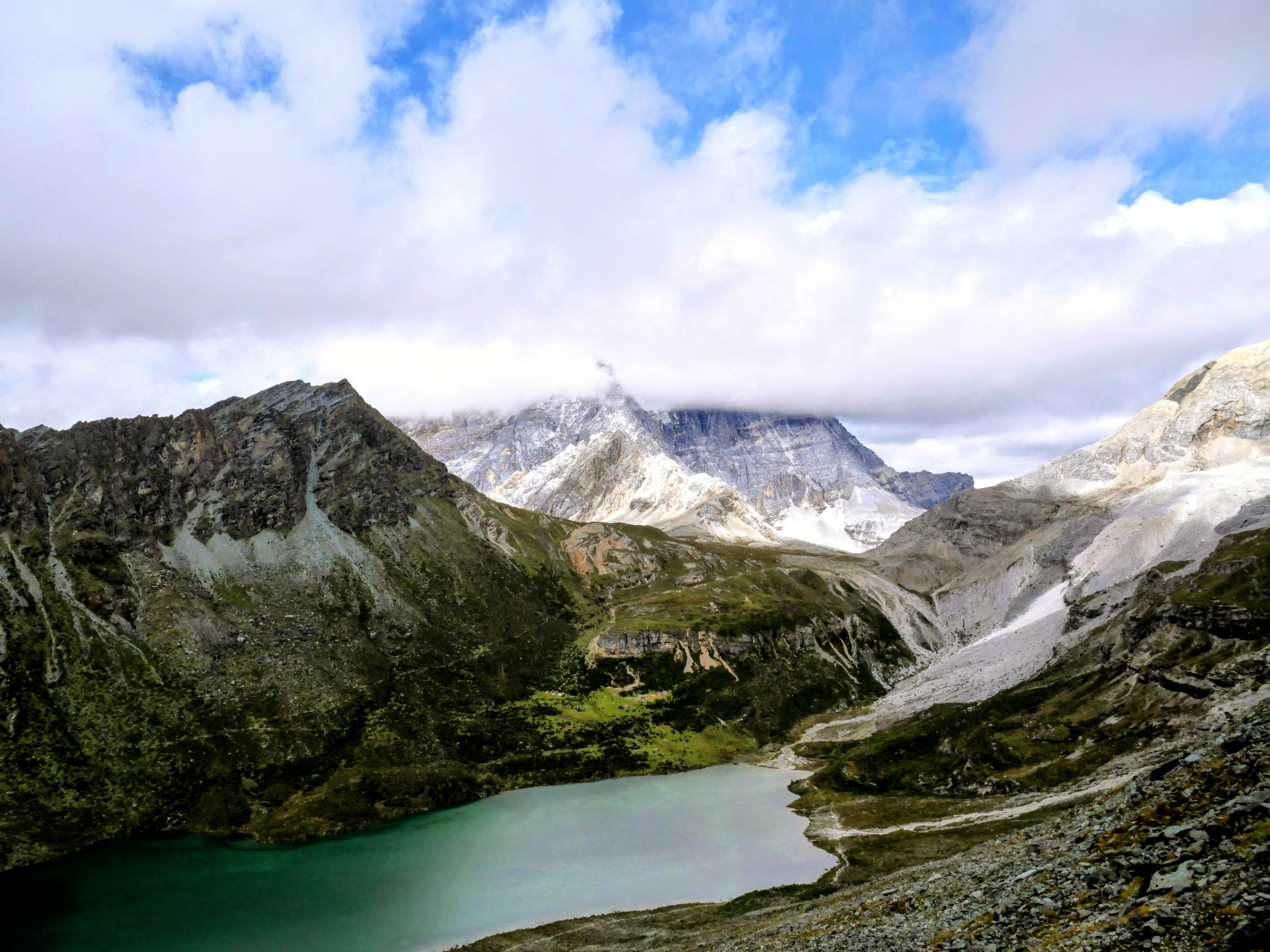
Panoramic view of Leshitso Snake Lake

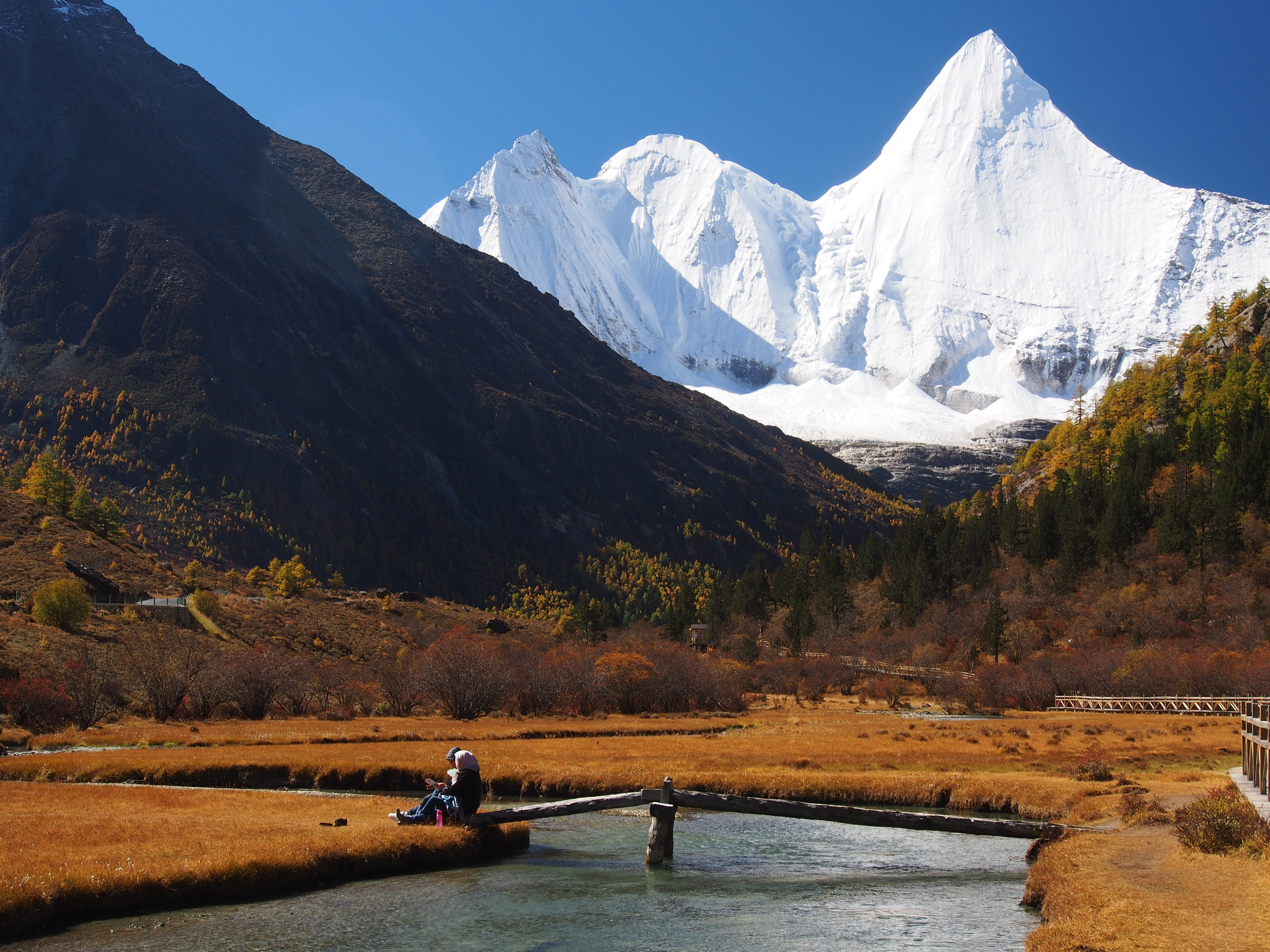
The sacred Mount Jampayang (Jampelyang)

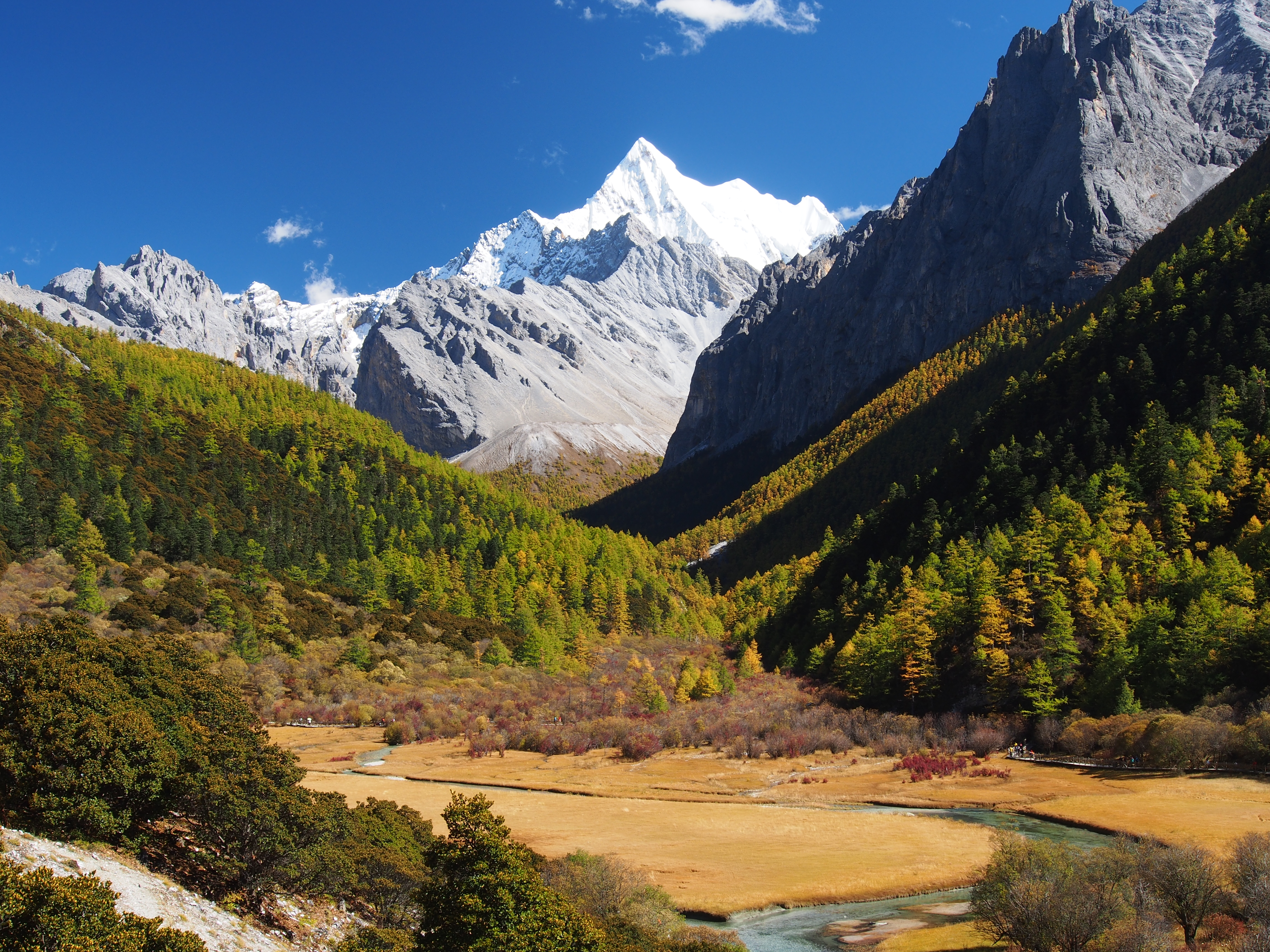
The sacred Mount Chanadorje (Xianuoduoji)

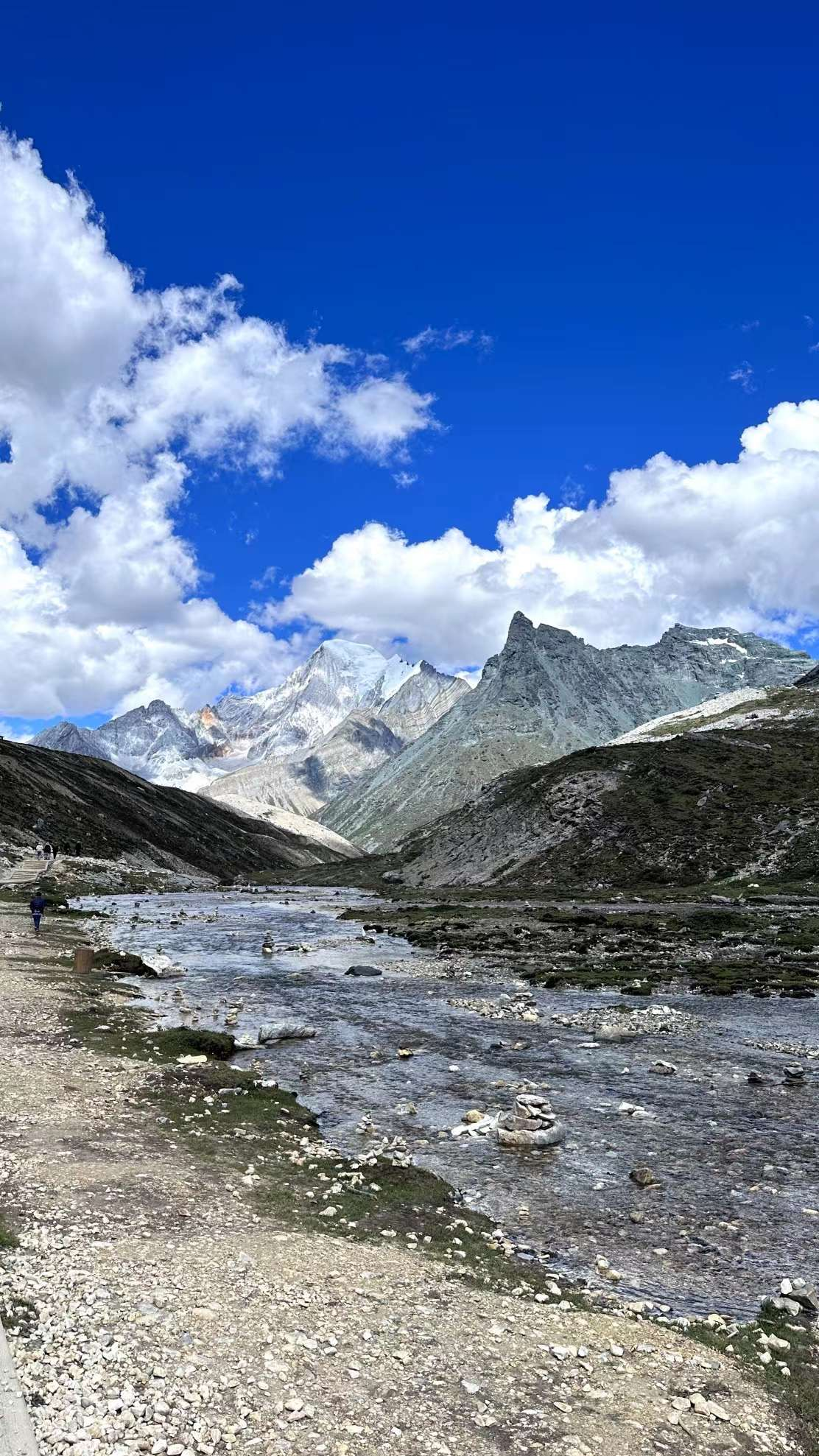
The Milk Sea in Aden, Daocheng, Ganzi Tibetan Autonomous Prefecture.

Nyidên (Tibetan: ཉི་བརྟེན་, Wylie: nyi brten), or Yading (Chinese: 亚丁; pinyin: Yàdīng), is a nature reserve in Daocheng County, in the southwest of Sichuan Province, China. It is a mountain sanctuary and major Tibetan pilgrimage site comprising three peaks sanctified by the 5th Dalai Lama. The peaks are seen as emanations of the three boddhisatvas Chenrezig (Avalokiteśvara), Jampelyang (Manjushri) and Chanadorje (Vajrapani), with Jampelyang being the highest peak at 6032 meters above sea level. It is served by Daocheng Yading Airport.
