= Tragyal =

Tibetan writer

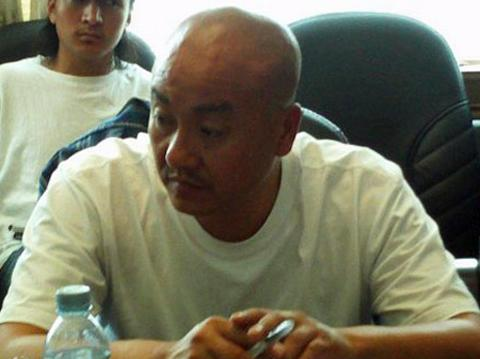
Tragyal (Shogdung), April 2010

Tragyal is a Tibetan writer who wrote a book, The Line Between Sky and Earth, about the 2008 Tibetan unrest, which he suggests could be called the "Maroon Revolution" if considered one of the wave of modern color revolutions after the color of the monks' robes. He advocates peaceful revolution using civil disobedience. Tragyal, 47 at the time of his arrest, was employed at a Chinese publishing house. He is the author of several works attacking Buddhist superstition, written using the name "Shogdung". Tragyal was arrested in Xining by Chinese authorities April, 2010 and will stand trial on a charge of "splittism" in August, 2010.

== Works ==
The Division of Heaven and Earth: On Tibet's Peaceful Revolution by Shokdung (Author), Matthew Akester (Translator)
