= Gerze =

Gerze may refer to:

- Gerze, Turkey, district in Turkey
- Gêrzê County, Ngari Prefecture, Tibet Autonomous Region, China (Tibet)
