= Darebu Cuo =

Alpine lake in Tibet, China

- Tarap Tso
- རྟ་རབས་མཚོ། (Standard Tibetan)
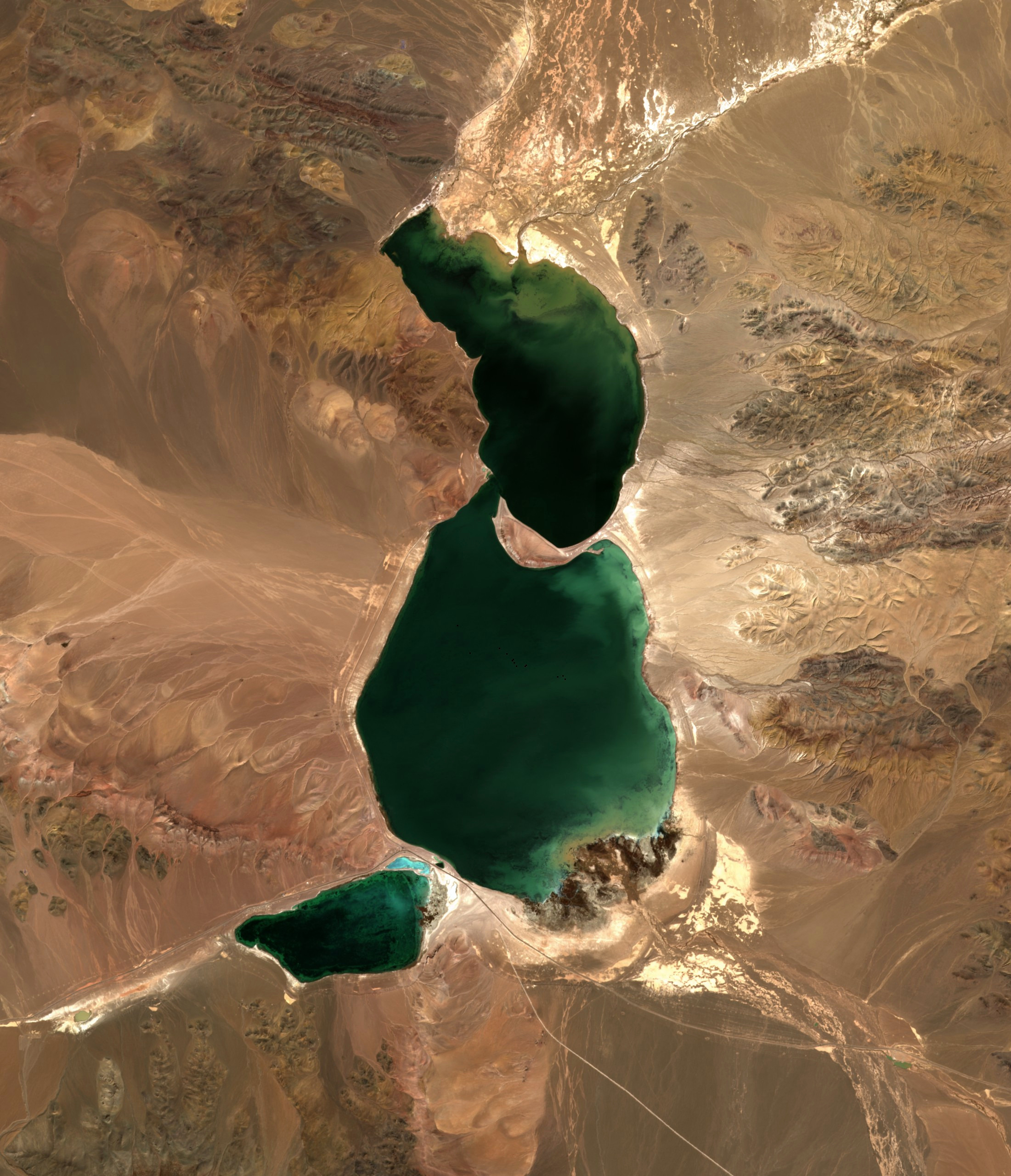
- Sentinel-2 image (2022)

- Location within Tibet
- Location: Gêrzê County, Ngari Prefecture, Tibet, China
- Coordinates: 32°29′41″N 83°12′56″E
- Surface area: 21 km^{2} (8.1 sq mi)
- Surface elevation: 4,436 m (14,554 ft)
- Frozen: Winter

Darebu Cuo or Darab Co (Chinese: 达热布错; pinyin: darebu cuò) or Tarap Tso (Tibetan: རྟ་རབས་མཚོ།, Wylie: rta rabs mtsho, THL: Tarap Tso) or Darebu Lake is a high-altitude alpine lake in Tibet, China.

== Location ==
The lake is located at 4,436 m (14,554 ft) in Gêrzê County in Ngari Prefecture of Tibet Autonomous Region and it covers an area of 21 square km.

China National Highway 317 passes through the south bank of the lake. And just below that road, another small alpine lake Oma Tso is located.

== Flora and fauna ==
In 2015, scientists from the Chinese Academy of Forestry found that the lake's ecosystem hosts seven species and has a diversity index of 2.1. The most prominent species of the ecosystem is Bar-headed Goose.
