= Tong Tso =

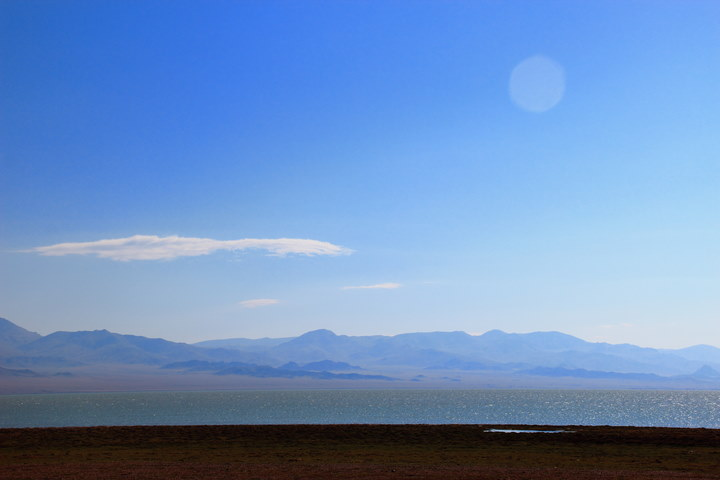

- Location within Ngari
- Coordinates: 32°10′N 84°44′E
- Type: Salt lake
- Basin countries: China
- Max. length: 13.8 km (9 mi)
- Max. width: 8.6 km (5 mi)
- Surface area: 87.7 km^{2} (0 sq mi)
- Surface elevation: 4,396 m (14,423 ft)
- Settlements: Dongco

Tong Tso (Tibetan: སྟོང་མཚོ, Wylie: stong mtsho) or Dong Co (Chinese: 洞错; pinyin: Dòng Cuò) is a plateau lake in Gêrzê County, Tibet Autonomous Region. The name of lake means "Desolate Lake" in Standard Tibetan. The lake has a total area of about 87.7 square kilometers. Lying at an elevation of 4,396 metres, it is dotted with two islands.

== Maps ==
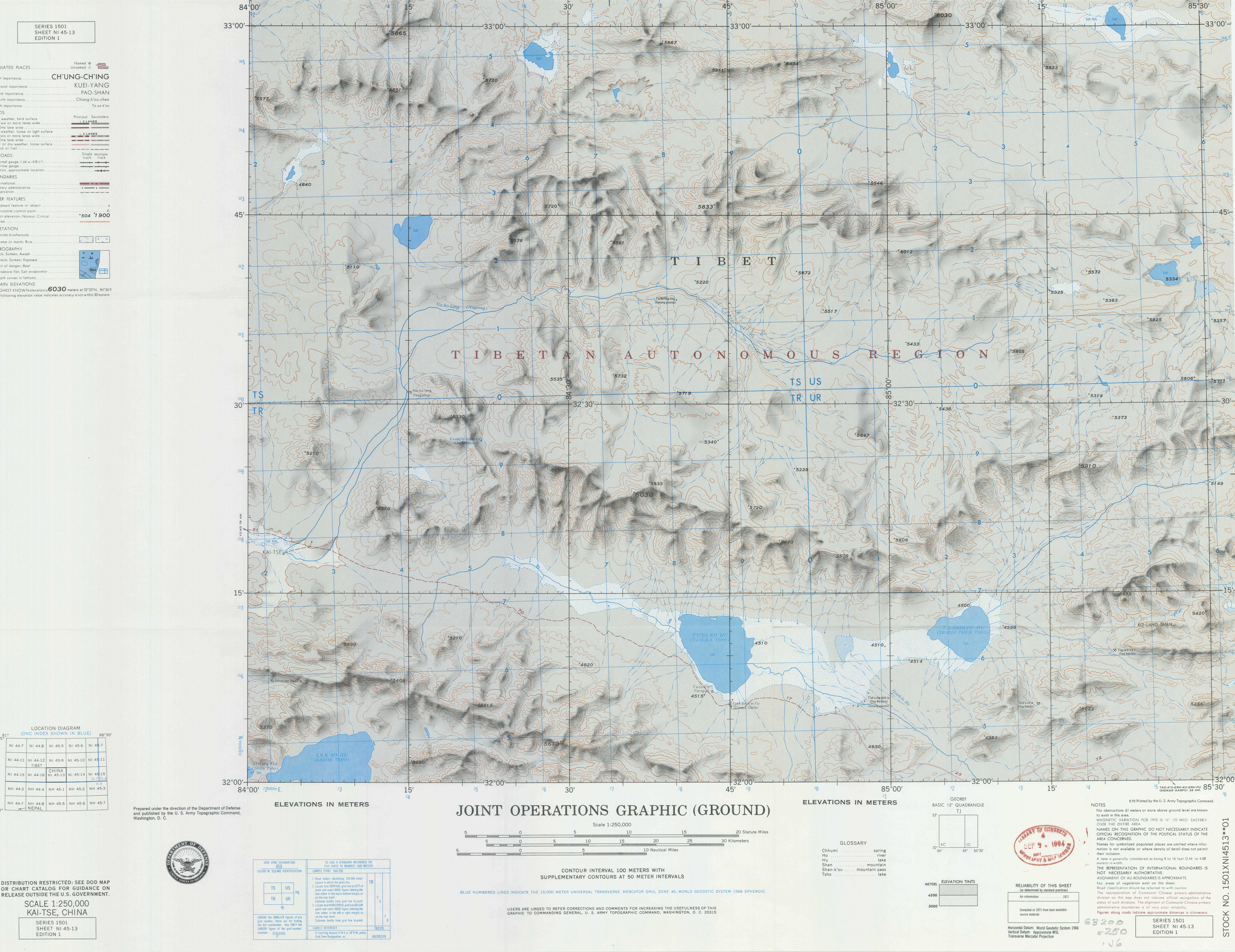
Map including Tong Tso (labeled as T'UNG-KO HU (TANGKA TSHO)) (ATC, 1972)

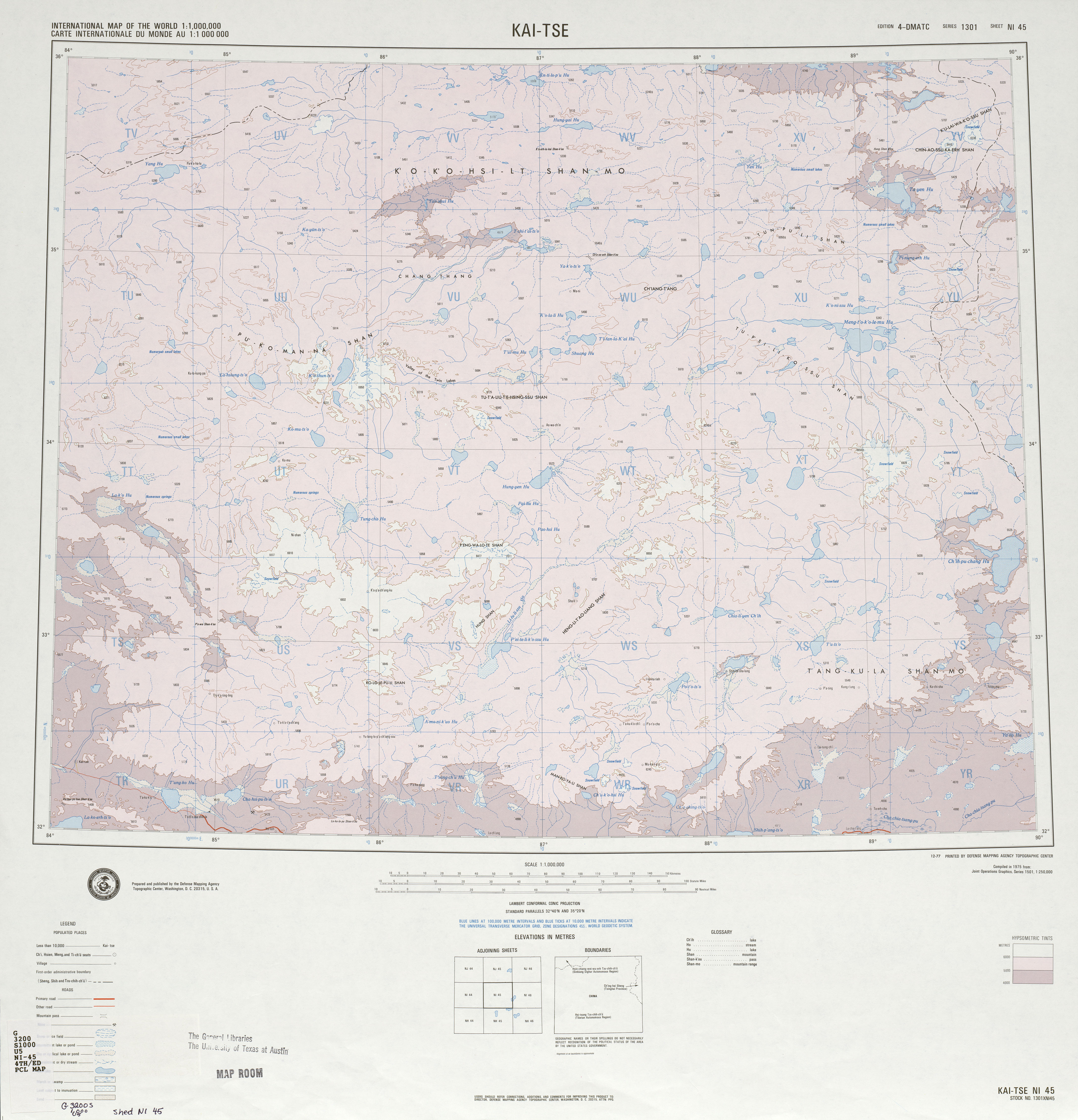
Map including Tong Tso (labeled as T'ung-ko Hu) (DMA, 1975)

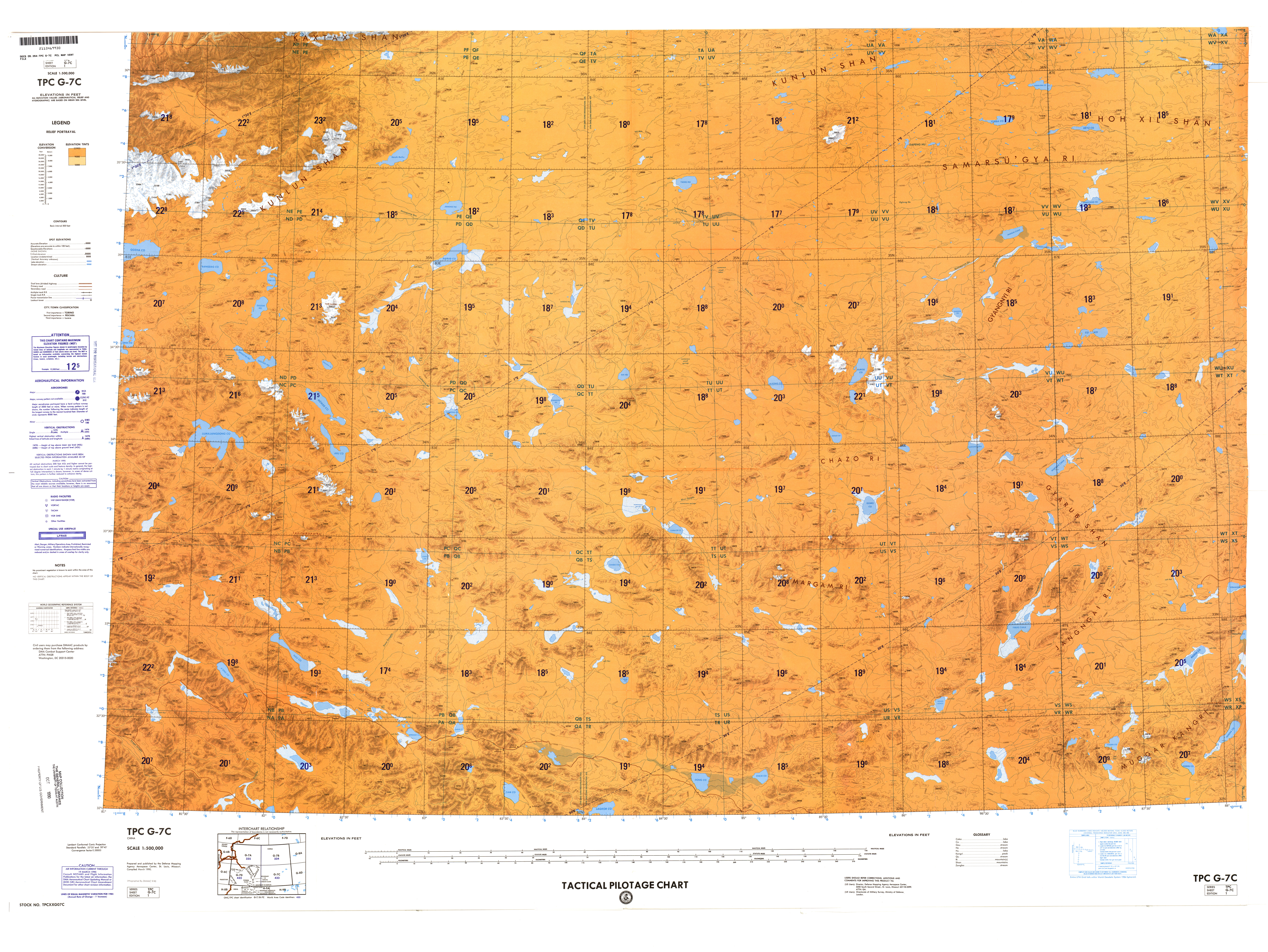
Map including Tong Tso (labeled as DONG CO) (DMA, 1990)
