= Gertse County =

Gertse County སྒེར་རྩེ་རྫོང་། • 改则县 Gêrzê, Gaize, Kai-tse
- County
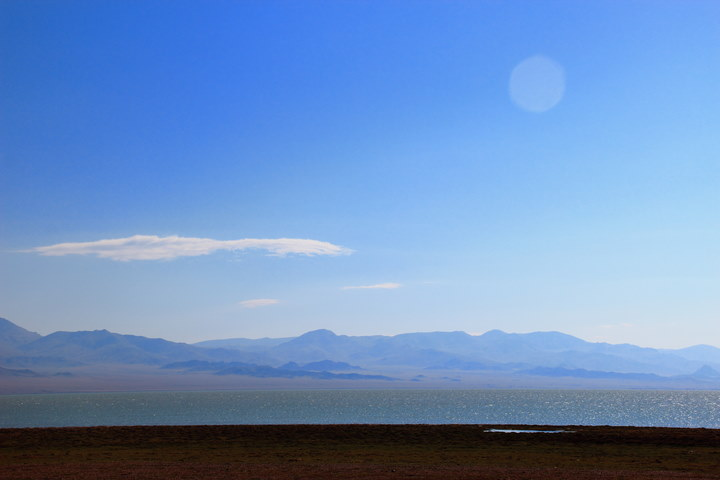
- Tong Tso

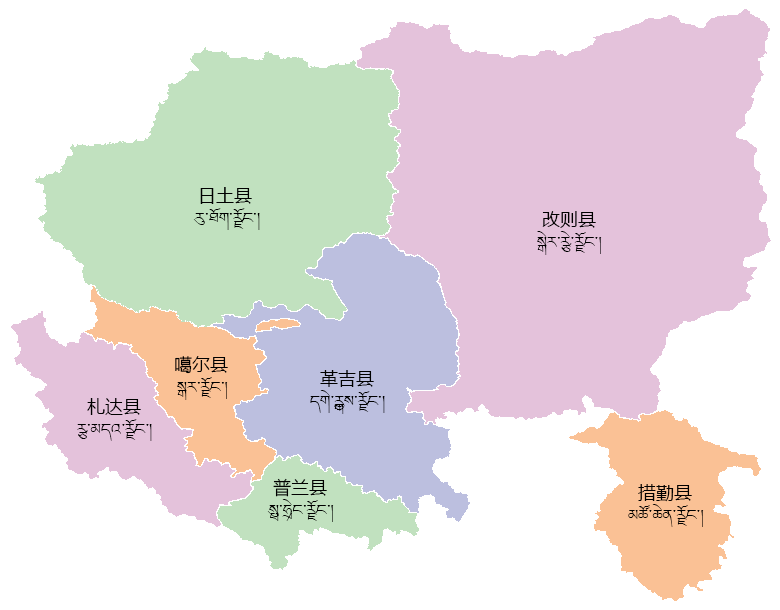
- Map showing Gêrzê County (purple, upper right) in Ngari Prefecture

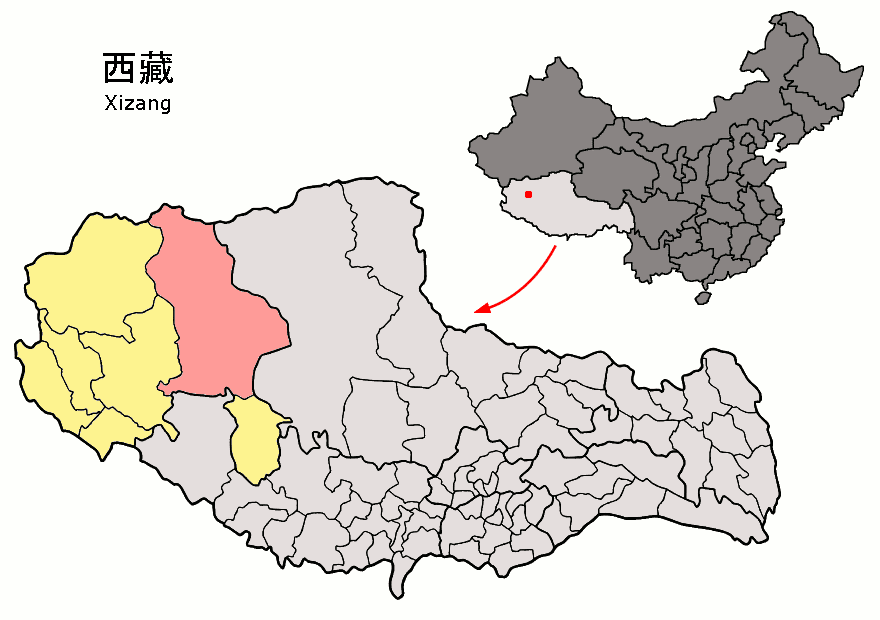
- Location of Gêrzê County (red) within Ngari Prefecture (yellow) and the Tibet A.R.

- Location of the seat in the Tibet A.R. Gêrzê (Tibet) Gêrzê (China)
- Coordinates: 32.301°N 84.059°E
- Country: China
- Autonomous region: Tibet
- Prefecture: Ngari
- Established date: October 1960
- County seat: Gêrzê
- Township-level divisions: 1 town, 6 townships

Area
  - Total: 135,025 km^{2} (52,133 sq mi)

Population (2020)
  - Total: 25,327
  - Density: 0.18757/km^{2} (0.48581/sq mi)

Ethnic groups
  - Major ethnic groups: Tibetan
- Time zone: UTC+8 (China Standard)
- Postal code: 859200
- Website: gz.al.gov.cn (in Chinese)

Gertse County

Chinese name
- Simplified Chinese: 改则县
- Traditional Chinese: 改則縣
Transcriptions
Standard Mandarin
- Hanyu Pinyin: Gǎizé Xiàn

Tibetan name
- Tibetan: སྒེར་རྩེ་རྫོང་།
Transcriptions
- Wylie: sger rtse rdzong
- THL: ger tsé dzong
- Tibetan Pinyin: Gêrzê Zong

Gertse County (Tibetan: སྒེར་རྩེ་རྫོང་།), Gêrzê County or Gaize County (Chinese: 改则县) is a county located in Ngari Prefecture in the northwest of the Tibet Autonomous Region, China, bordering Xinjiang to the north.

== Name ==
Gêrzê is the Tibetan word for a special type of local-style dwelling built on the peak of a mountain.

== History ==
The area was originally inhabited by nomadic tribes.

In the aftermath of the annexation of Tibet by the People's Republic of China in the early 1950s, People's Liberation Army troops were stationed in Gêrzê.

On May 3, 1960, the Gêrzê County Committee of the Chinese Communist Party was established. On October 1, 1960, the Gêrzê County government was established.

At 2:01 AM on February 21, 2020, a 5.0 magnitude earthquake struck in Gêrzê County (epicenter: 34.56°N 85.68°E).

At 2:12 AM on March 10, 2020, a 5.0 magnitude earthquake struck in Gêrzê County (epicenter: 32.84°N 85.52°E) followed by a 3.7 magnitude and a 3.4 magnitude aftershock. No casualties were reported.

On May 8, 2020, eight suspects were arrested and eighty-nine antelope skins were confiscated in connection with reported Tibetan antelope poaching in the county.

== Geography ==
Gêrzê County is bordered to the north by Keriya County (Yutian) in Hotan Prefecture (Hetian), Xinjiang and to the west by Rutog County. There are numerous lakes in Gêrzê County, notably Tong Tso. Thermal springs in Gêrzê County include Lugu (70 °C or 158 °F; 33°24′24″N 84°08′12″E; altitude 4,528 metres or 14,856 feet), Nagezhong (60 °C or 140 °F; 32°18′N 84°12′E; altitude 4,550 metres or 14,930 feet) and Yarlhaingari (60 °C or 140 °F; 33°00′48″N 86°01′36″E; altitude 4,880 metres or 16,010 feet).

=== Climate ===
Gêrzê County has a cold semi-arid climate (Köppen: BSk), with strong dry-winter subalpine (Köppen: Dwc) tendencies.

Climate data for Gêrzê, elevation 4,279 m (14,039 ft), (1991–2020 normals, extremes 1981–2010)
Month	Jan	Feb	Mar	Apr	May	Jun	Jul	Aug	Sep	Oct	Nov	Dec	Year
Record high °C (°F)	8.3 (46.9)	10.5 (50.9)	14.5 (58.1)	15.9 (60.6)	22.0 (71.6)	26.1 (79.0)	27.6 (81.7)	25.0 (77.0)	22.6 (72.7)	17.2 (63.0)	12.9 (55.2)	8.3 (46.9)	27.6 (81.7)
Mean daily maximum °C (°F)	−2.7 (27.1)	−0.3 (31.5)	3.8 (38.8)	8.5 (47.3)	13.0 (55.4)	18.2 (64.8)	20.4 (68.7)	18.6 (65.5)	16.2 (61.2)	8.6 (47.5)	3.3 (37.9)	−0.5 (31.1)	8.9 (48.1)
Daily mean °C (°F)	−11.1 (12.0)	−8.2 (17.2)	−4.1 (24.6)	0.7 (33.3)	5.2 (41.4)	10.5 (50.9)	13.2 (55.8)	11.9 (53.4)	9.1 (48.4)	0.6 (33.1)	−5.8 (21.6)	−9.9 (14.2)	1.0 (33.8)
Mean daily minimum °C (°F)	−20.3 (−4.5)	−17.6 (0.3)	−13.4 (7.9)	−7.9 (17.8)	−2.7 (27.1)	3.1 (37.6)	6.7 (44.1)	6.2 (43.2)	2.1 (35.8)	−7.5 (18.5)	−14.6 (5.7)	−19.2 (−2.6)	−7.1 (19.2)
Record low °C (°F)	−44.0 (−47.2)	−42.4 (−44.3)	−32.1 (−25.8)	−20.0 (−4.0)	−15.7 (3.7)	−9.2 (15.4)	−3.3 (26.1)	−3.6 (25.5)	−9.5 (14.9)	−23.5 (−10.3)	−34.9 (−30.8)	−44.6 (−48.3)	−44.6 (−48.3)
Average precipitation mm (inches)	0.9 (0.04)	0.6 (0.02)	1.1 (0.04)	2.2 (0.09)	8.3 (0.33)	25.1 (0.99)	61.8 (2.43)	71.6 (2.82)	21.5 (0.85)	3.7 (0.15)	0.7 (0.03)	0.2 (0.01)	197.7 (7.8)
Average precipitation days (≥ 0.1 mm)	1.4	1.0	1.6	1.9	3.9	7.3	13.6	15.4	6.7	1.6	0.7	0.5	55.6
Average snowy days	3.8	3.3	4.2	4.7	7.8	4.2	0.7	0.4	2.5	2.9	1.5	1.4	37.4
Average relative humidity (%)	27	24	23	27	32	39	47	56	43	29	25	24	33
Mean monthly sunshine hours	232.4	222.9	258.2	271.1	305.2	303.0	284.1	257.4	280.4	295.7	260.1	253.0	3,223.5
Percentage possible sunshine	72	71	69	69	71	71	66	63	77	85	84	81	73
Source: China Meteorological Administration

== Administrative divisions ==
Gêrzê county is divided into 1 town and 6 townships:

Name	Chinese	Hanyu Pinyin	Tibetan	Wylie
Town
Gêrzê Town	改则镇	Gǎizé zhèn	སྒེར་རྩེ་གྲོང་རྡལ།	sger rtse grong rdal
Townships
Oma Township	物玛乡	Wùmǎ xiāng	འོ་མ་ཤང་།	'o ma shang
Shenchen Township	先遣乡	Xiānqiǎn xiāng	ཤན་ཆེན་ཤང་།	shan chen shang
Marmê Township	麻米乡	Mámǐ xiāng	མར་མེ་ཤང་།	mar me shang
Dongco Township	洞措乡	Dòngcuò xiāng	སྟོང་མཚོ་ཤང་།	stong mtsho shang
Gomo Township	古姆乡	Gǔmǔ xiāng	ཁྲ་མདོངས་ཤང་།	kra mdongs shang
Chabug Township	察布乡	Chábù xiāng	བྲག་པོ་ཤང་།	brag po shang

== Demographics ==
Historical population
Year	Pop.	±% p.a.
2000	17,502	—
2010	22,177	+2.40%

As of 1996, the residents of the county were Tibetan. In 1999, the population of the county was 16,623.

== Economy ==
The main economic activity in Gêrzê County is animal husbandry which includes the raising of yak, dzo, sheep, goats, and horses. The county also has wild yak, wild donkeys, wild sheep, bears and Tibetan antelope.

== Transportation ==
- Nagqu–Ngari Highway (黑阿公路)

== Historical maps ==
Historical maps including Gêrzê:

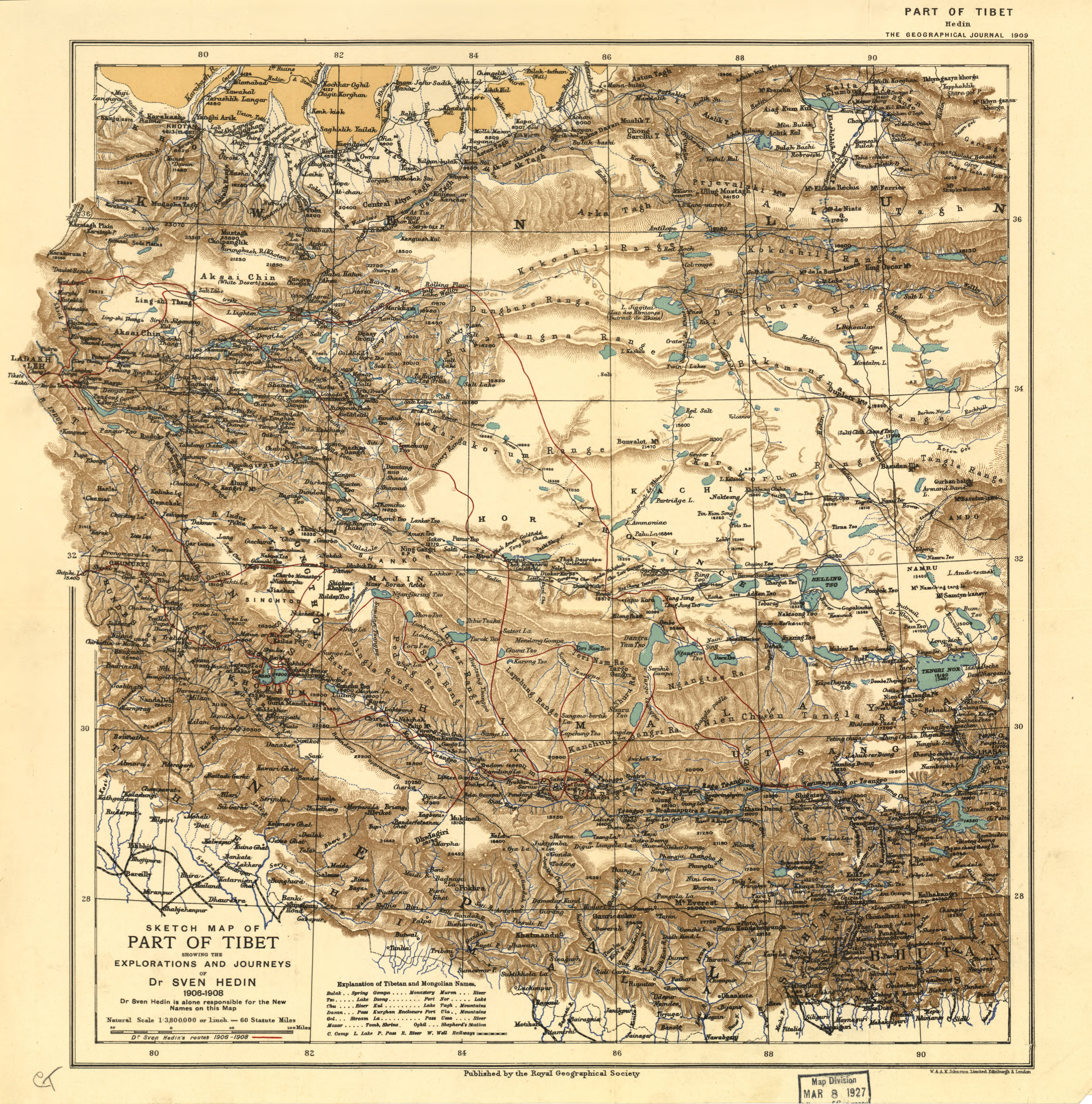
Map of the expeditions of Sven Hedin (1906–8) including the modern-day Gêrzê County area (RGS, early 20th century)

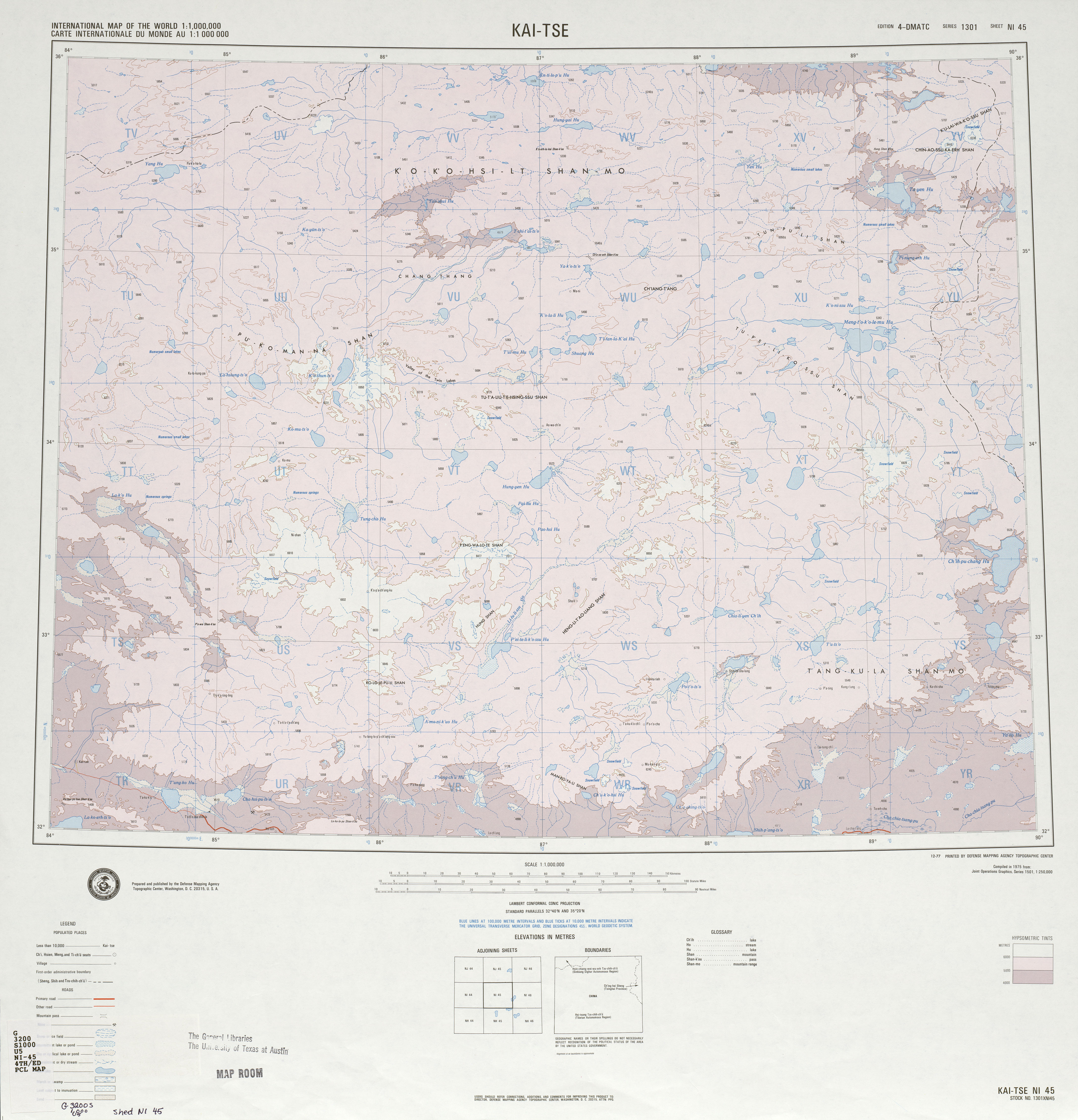
Map including Gêrzê (labeled as Kai-tse) (DMA, 1975)

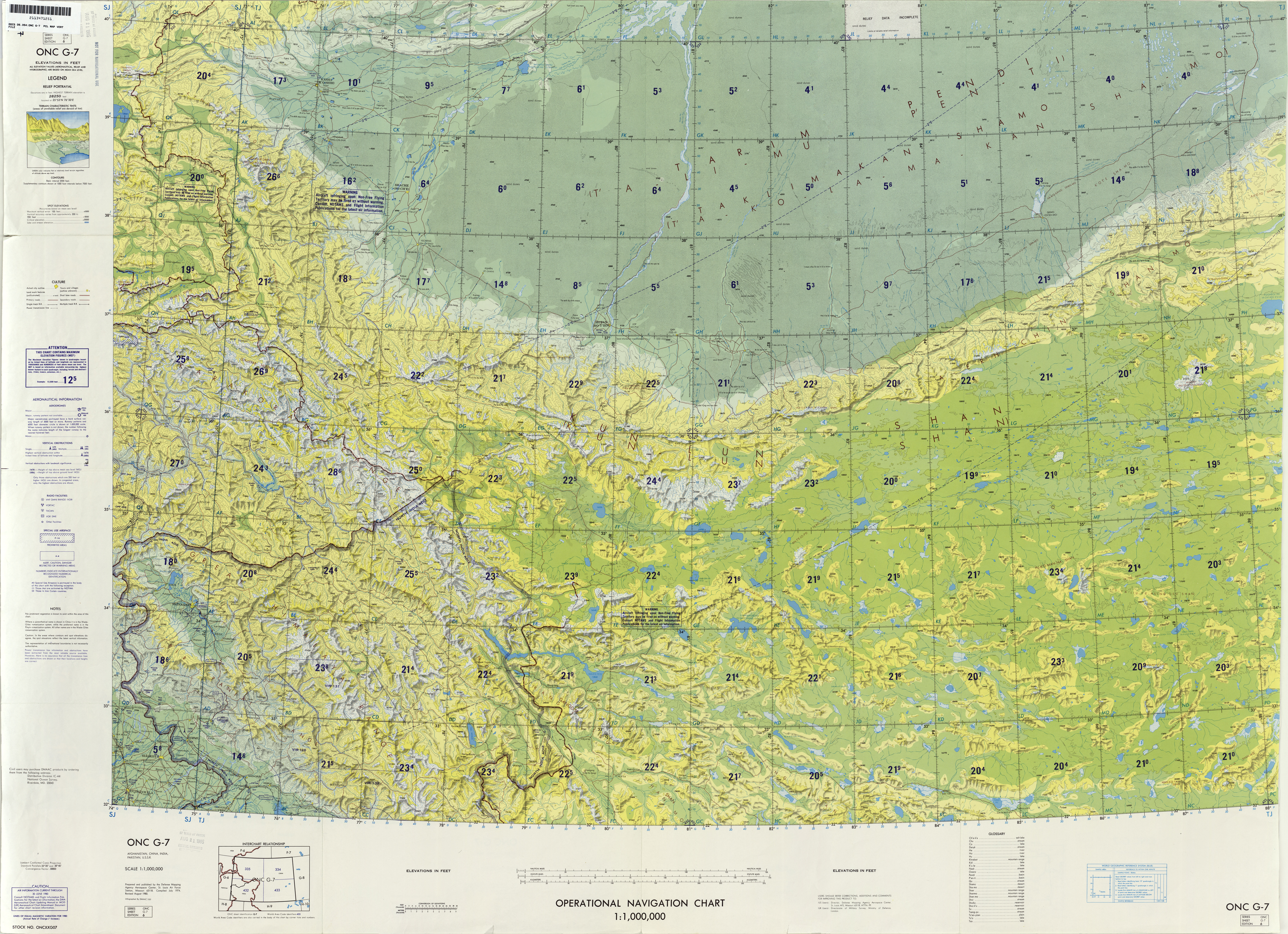
Map including Gêrzê (Kai-tse) (DMA, 1980)

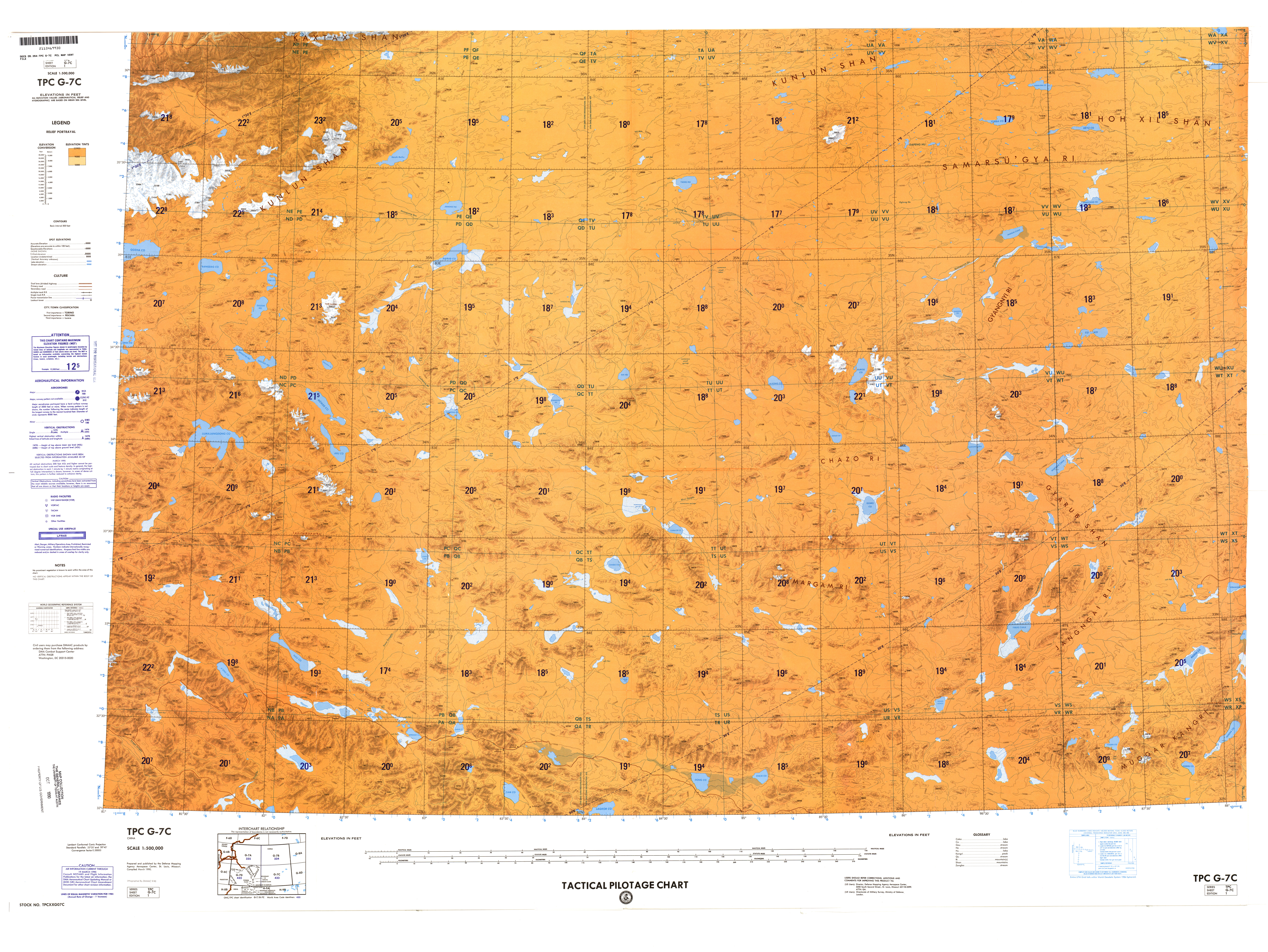
Map of the Gêrzê area (DMA, 1990)
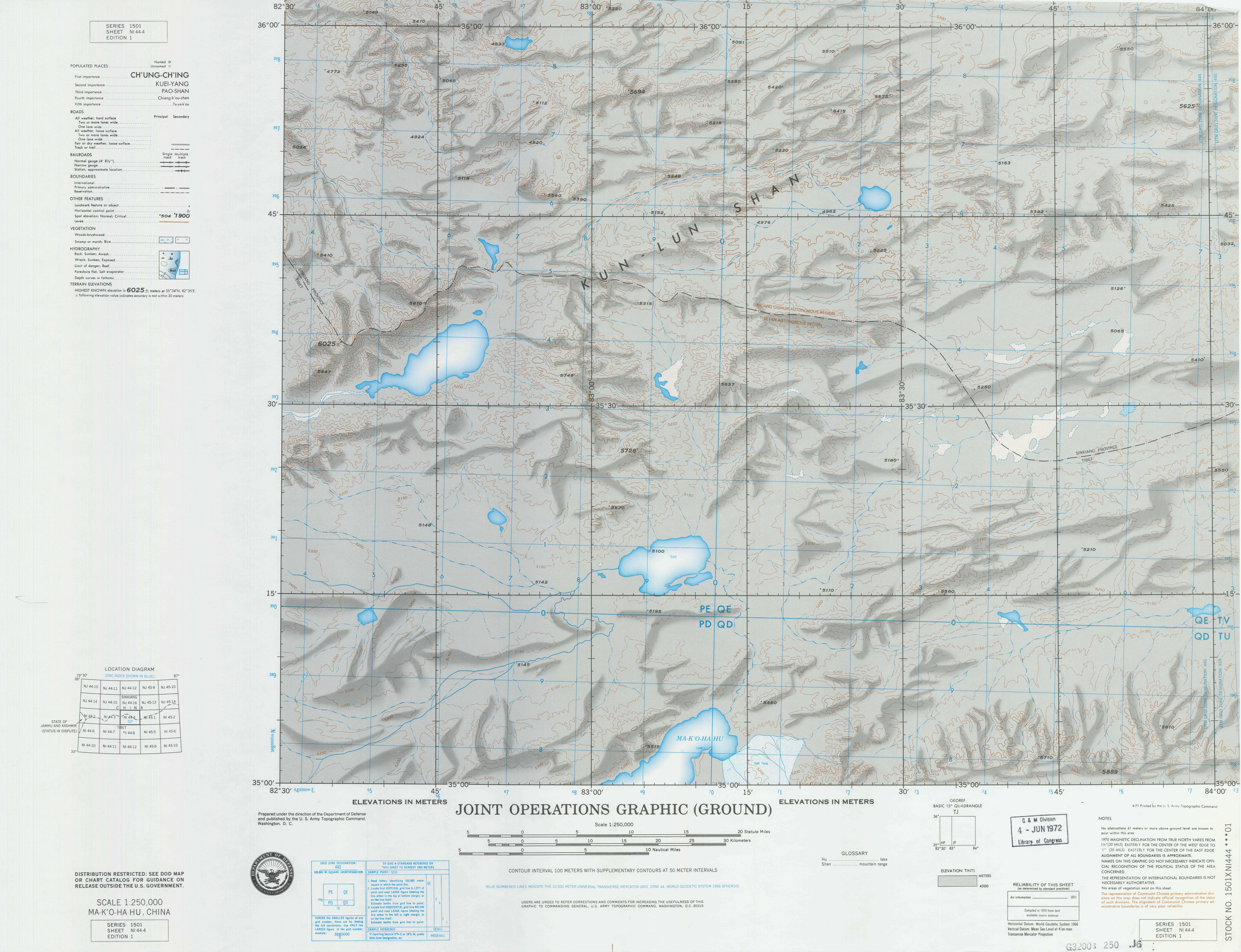
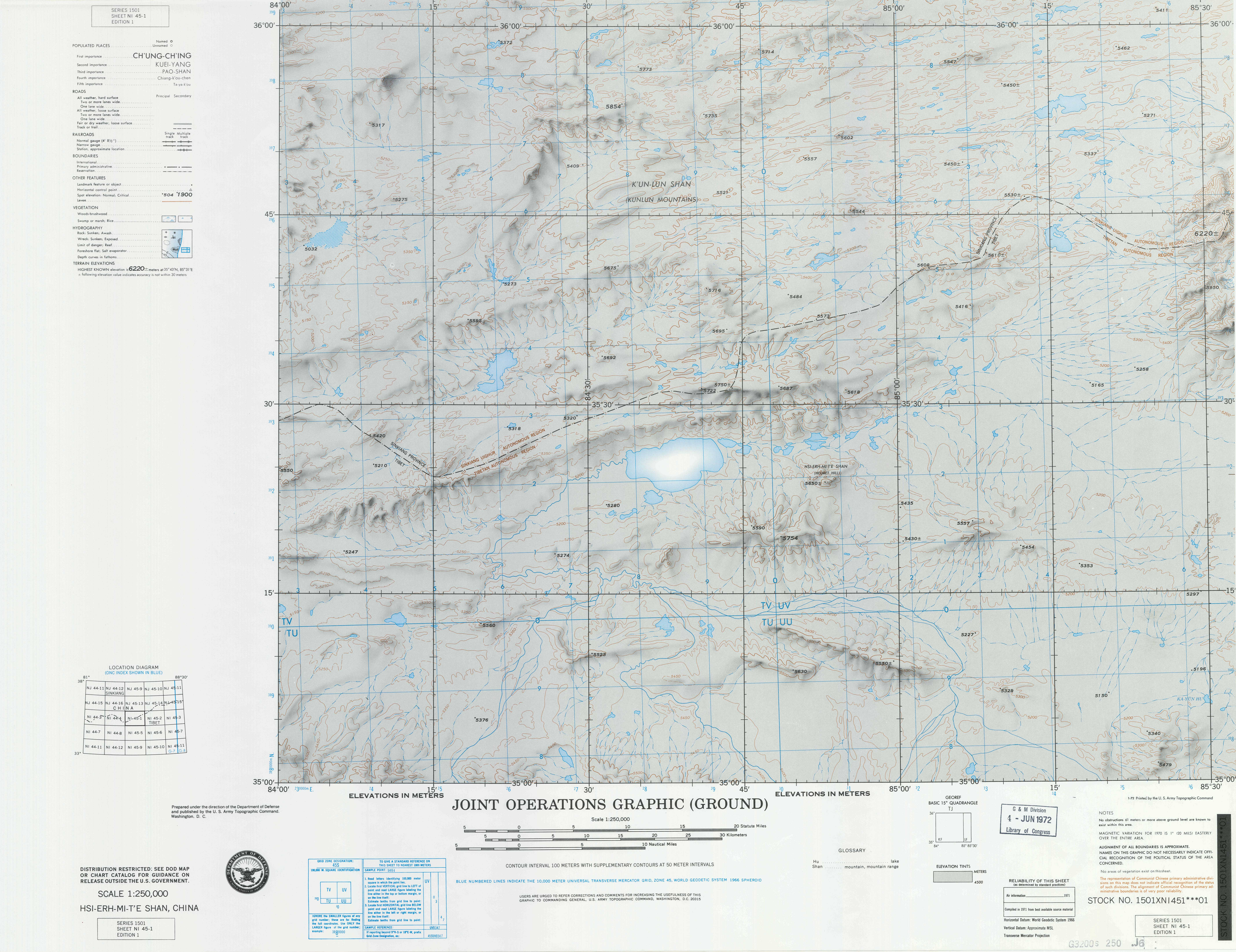
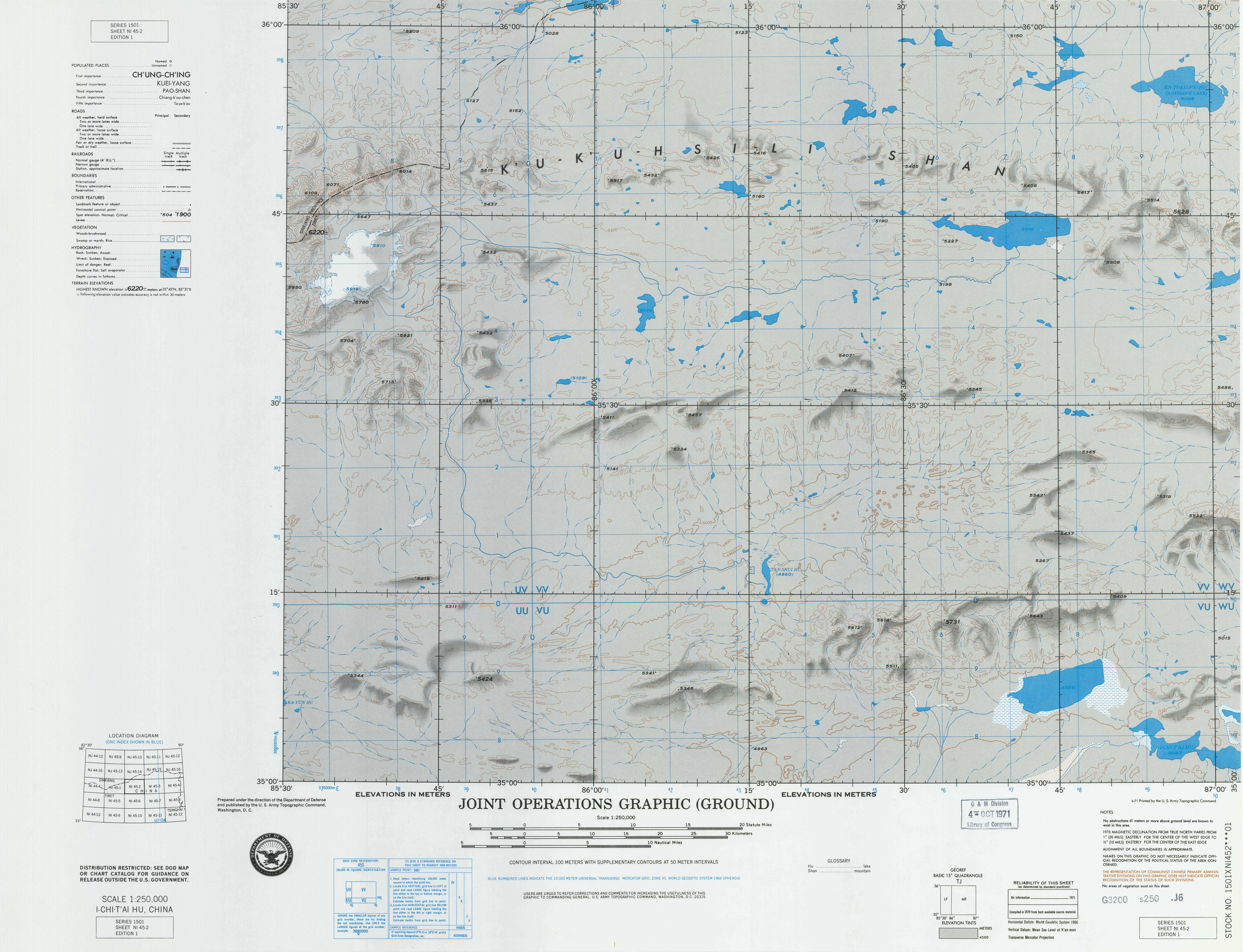
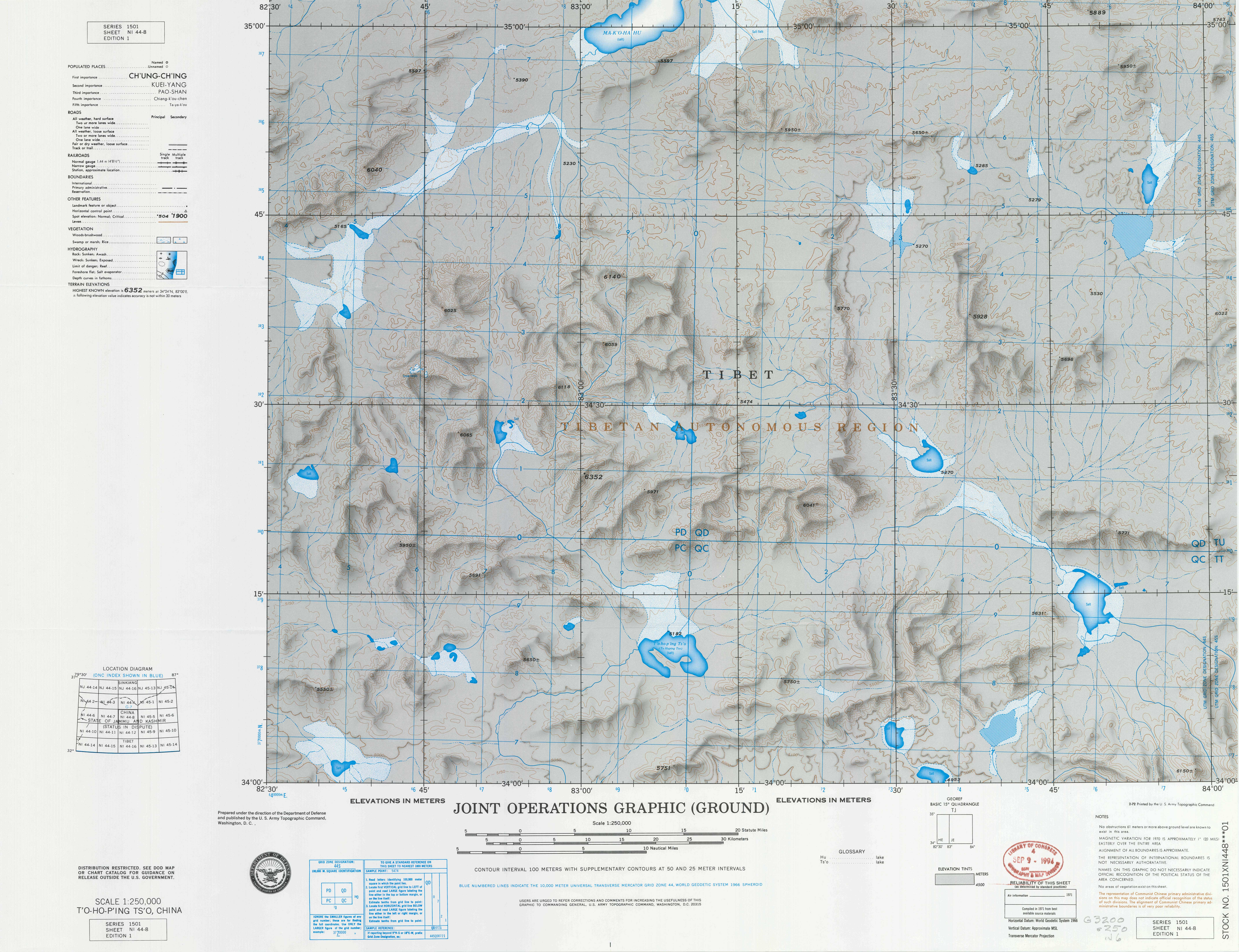
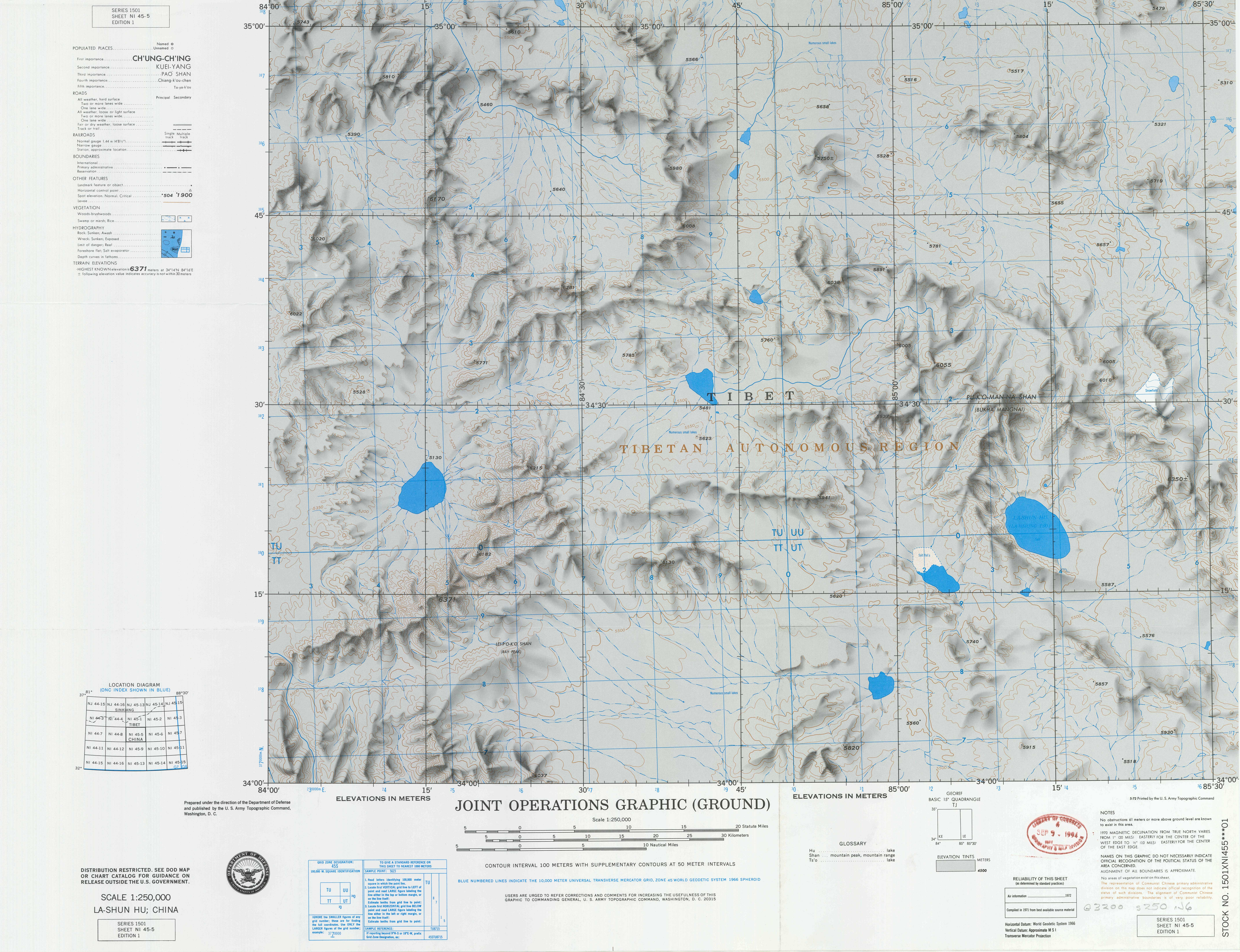
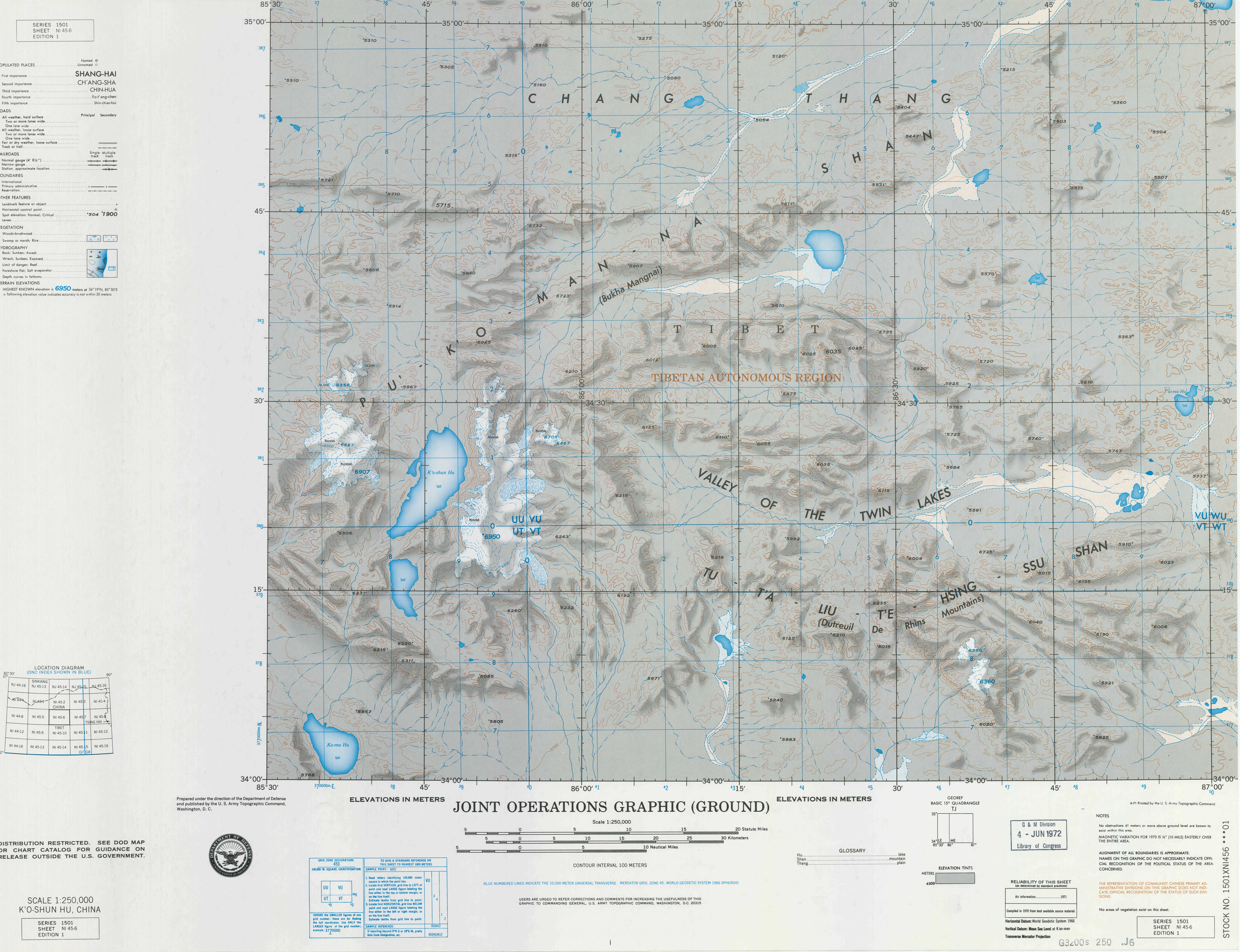
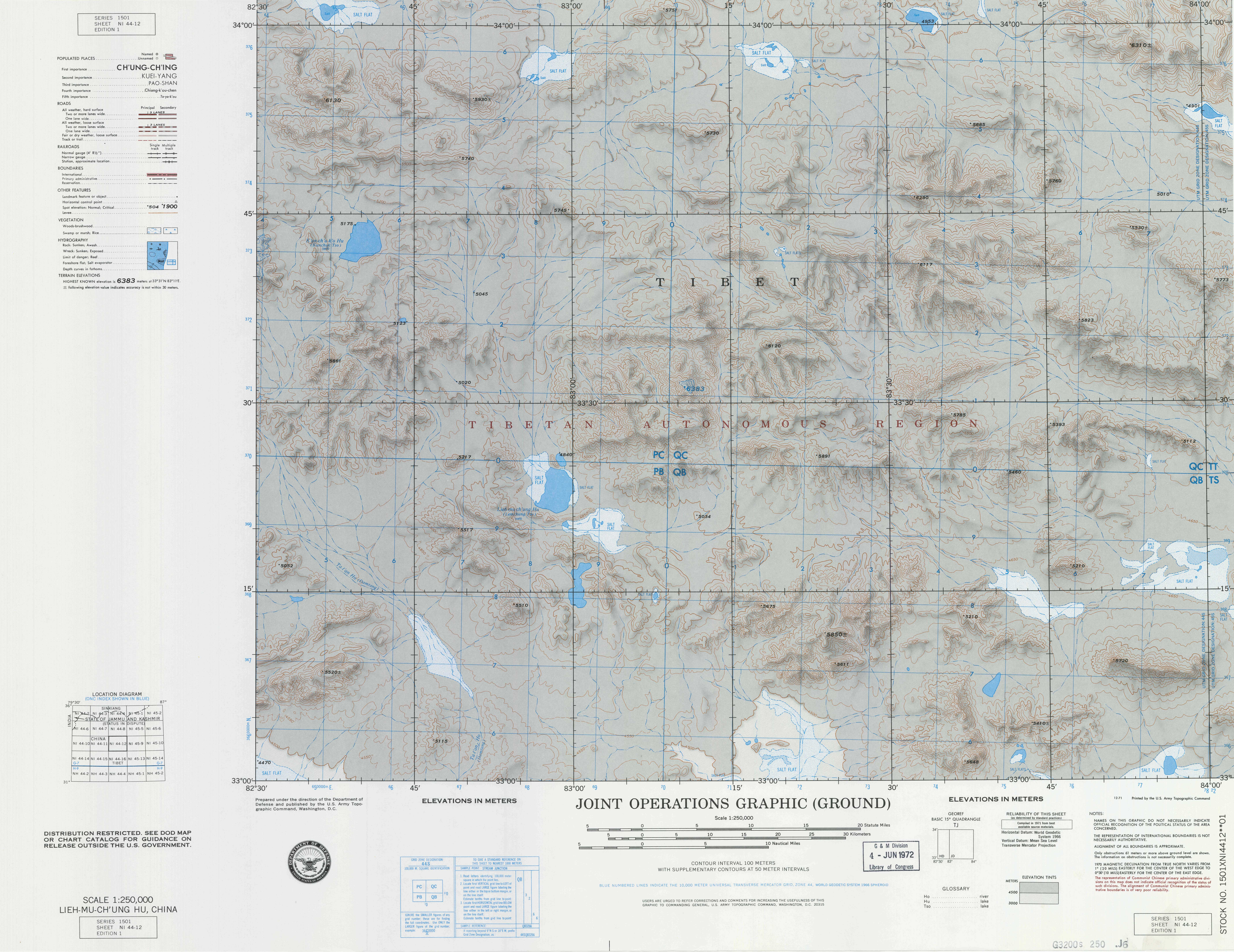
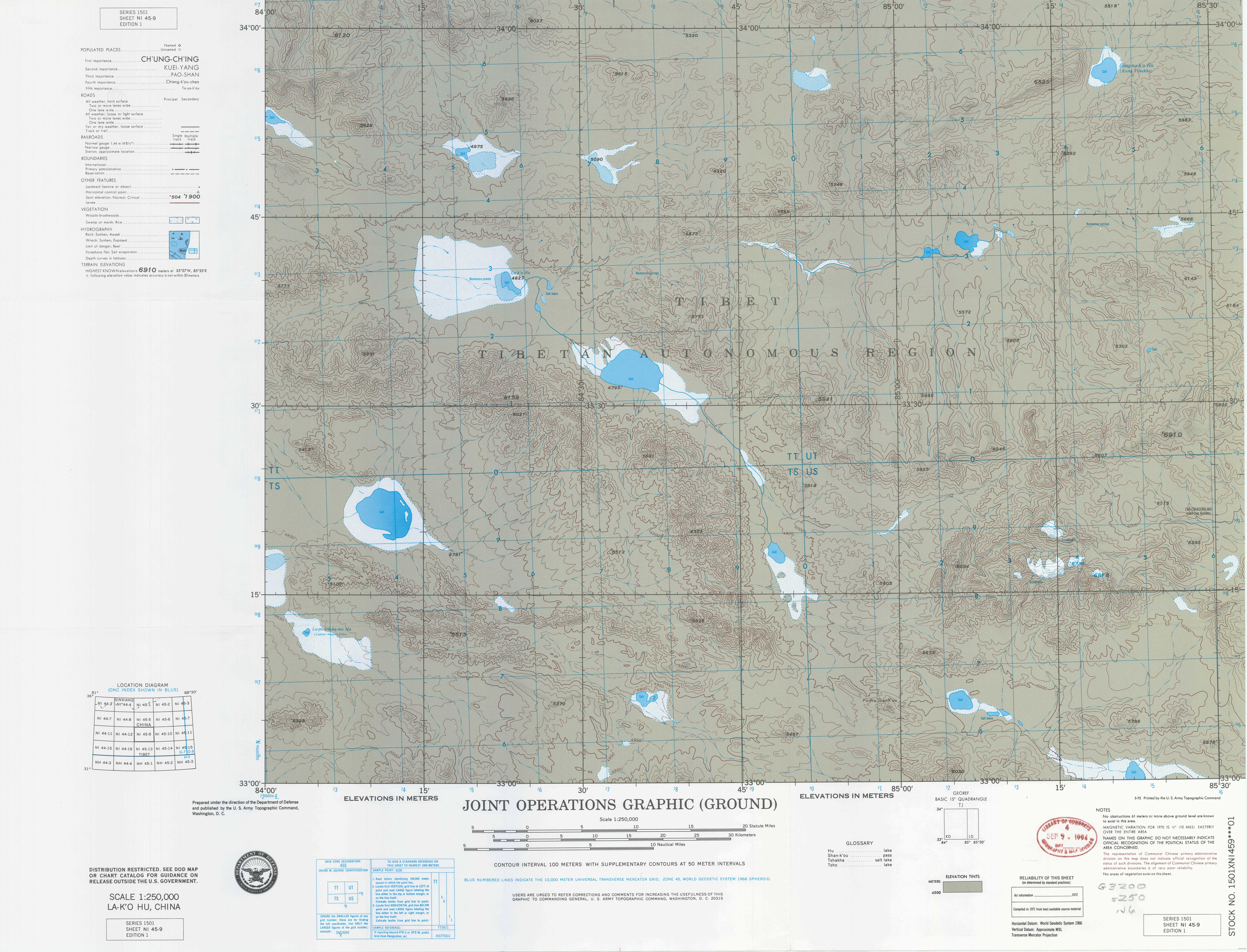
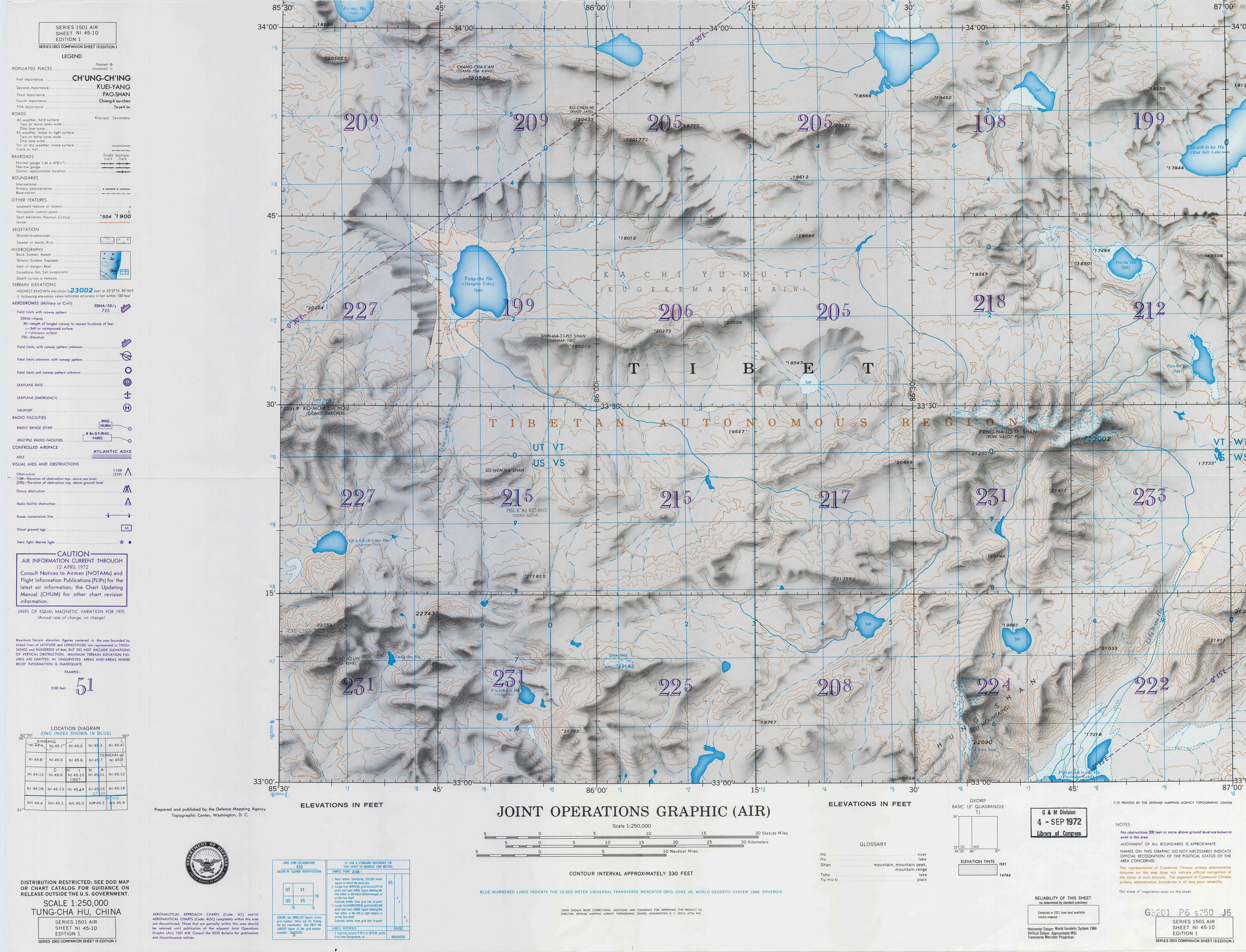
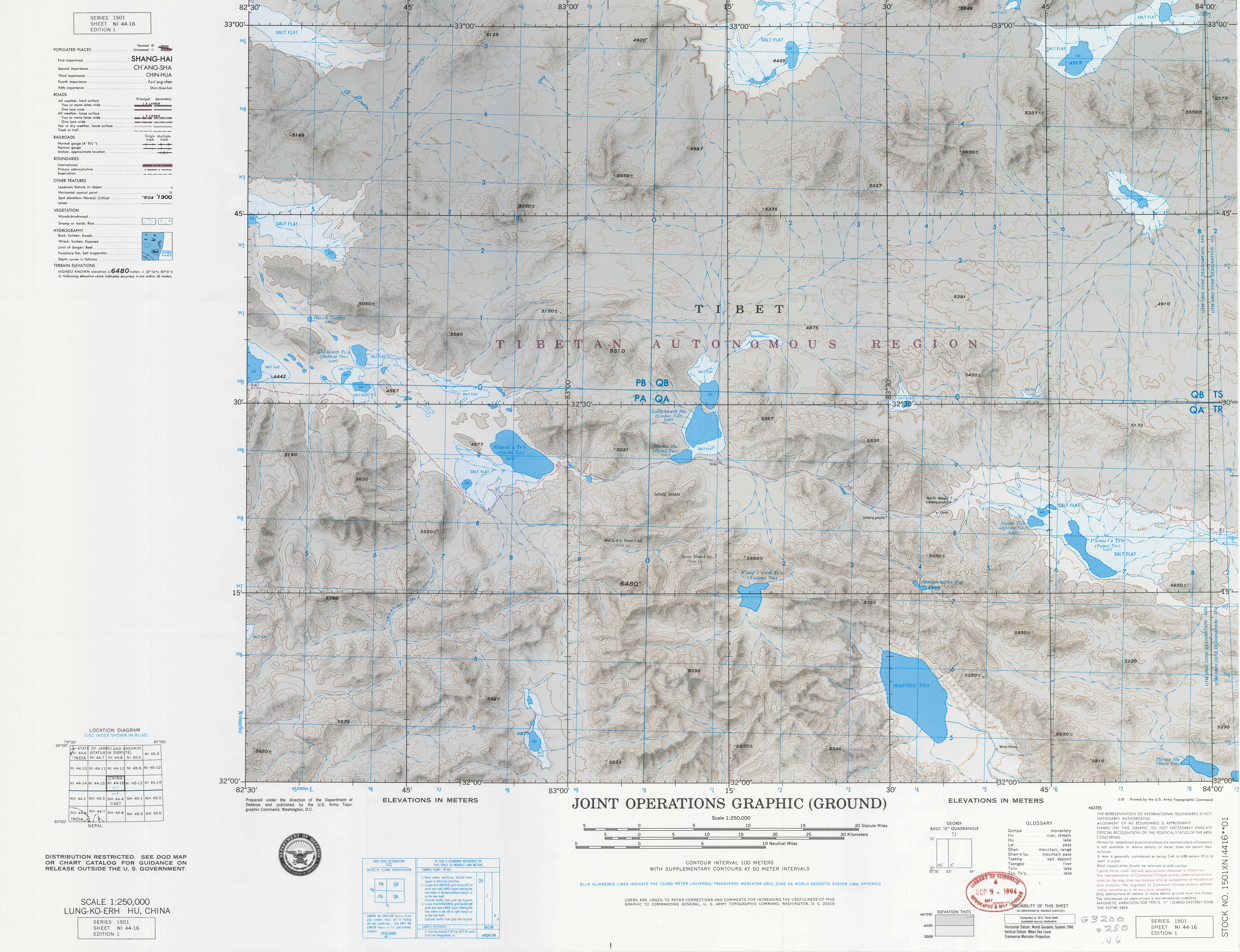
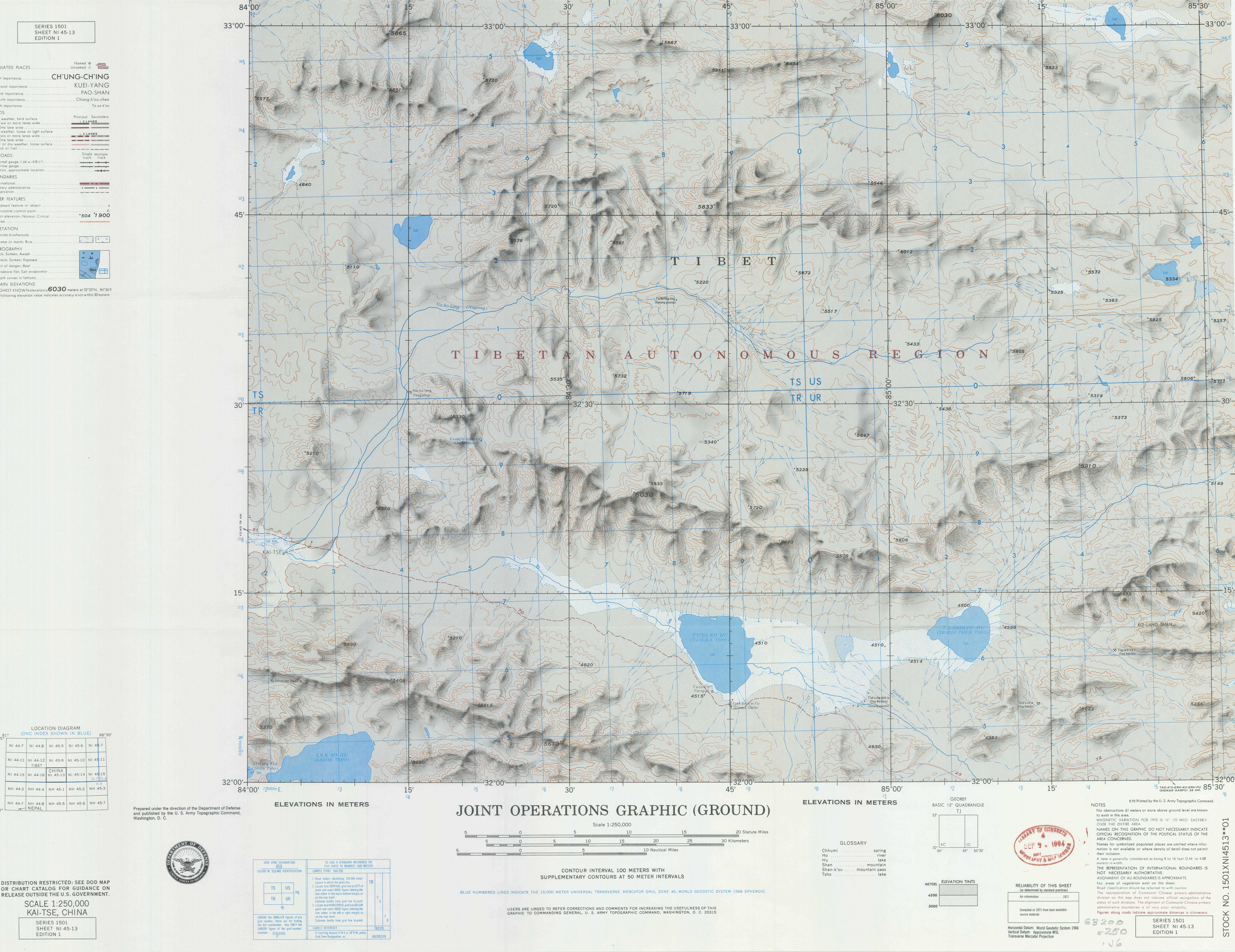
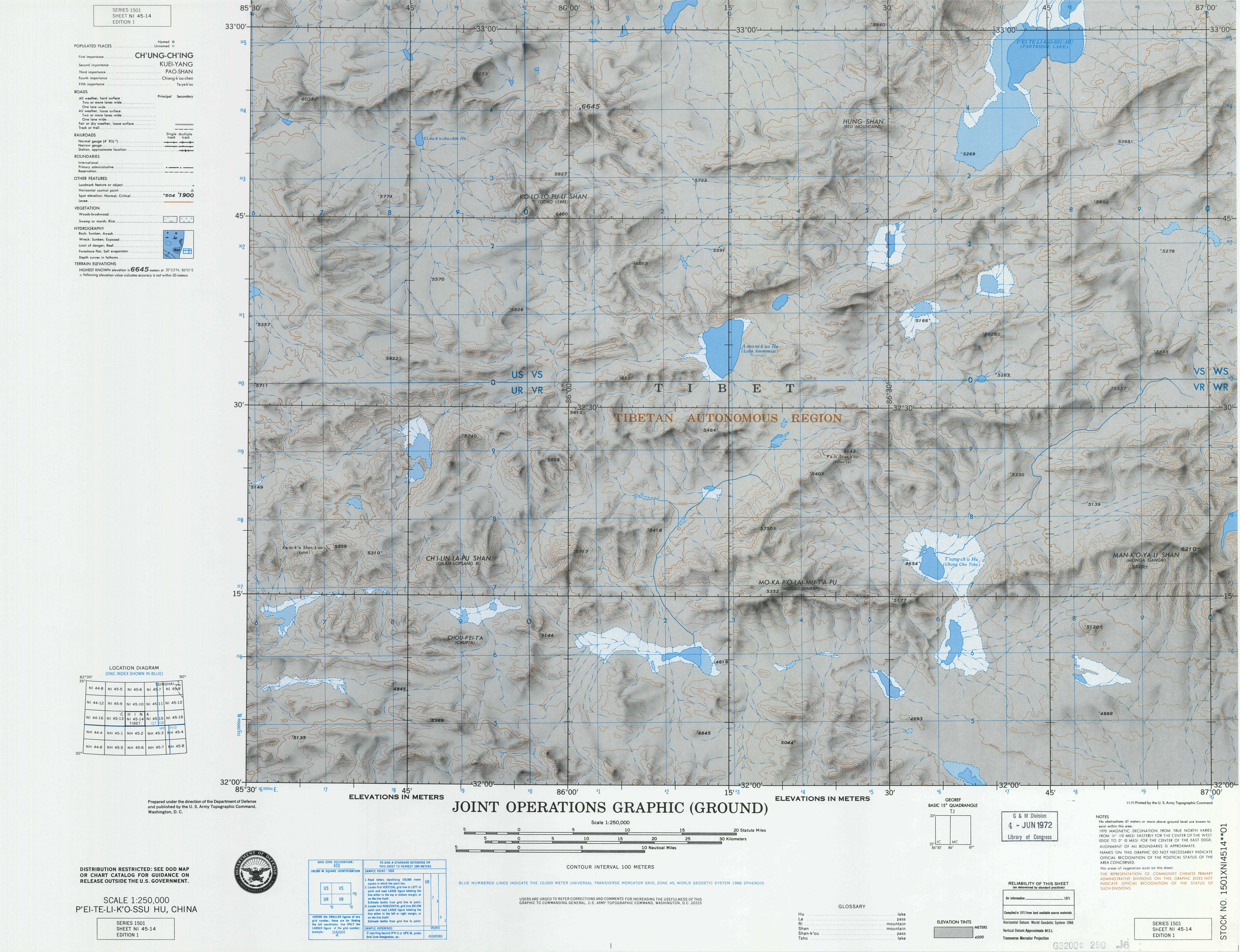
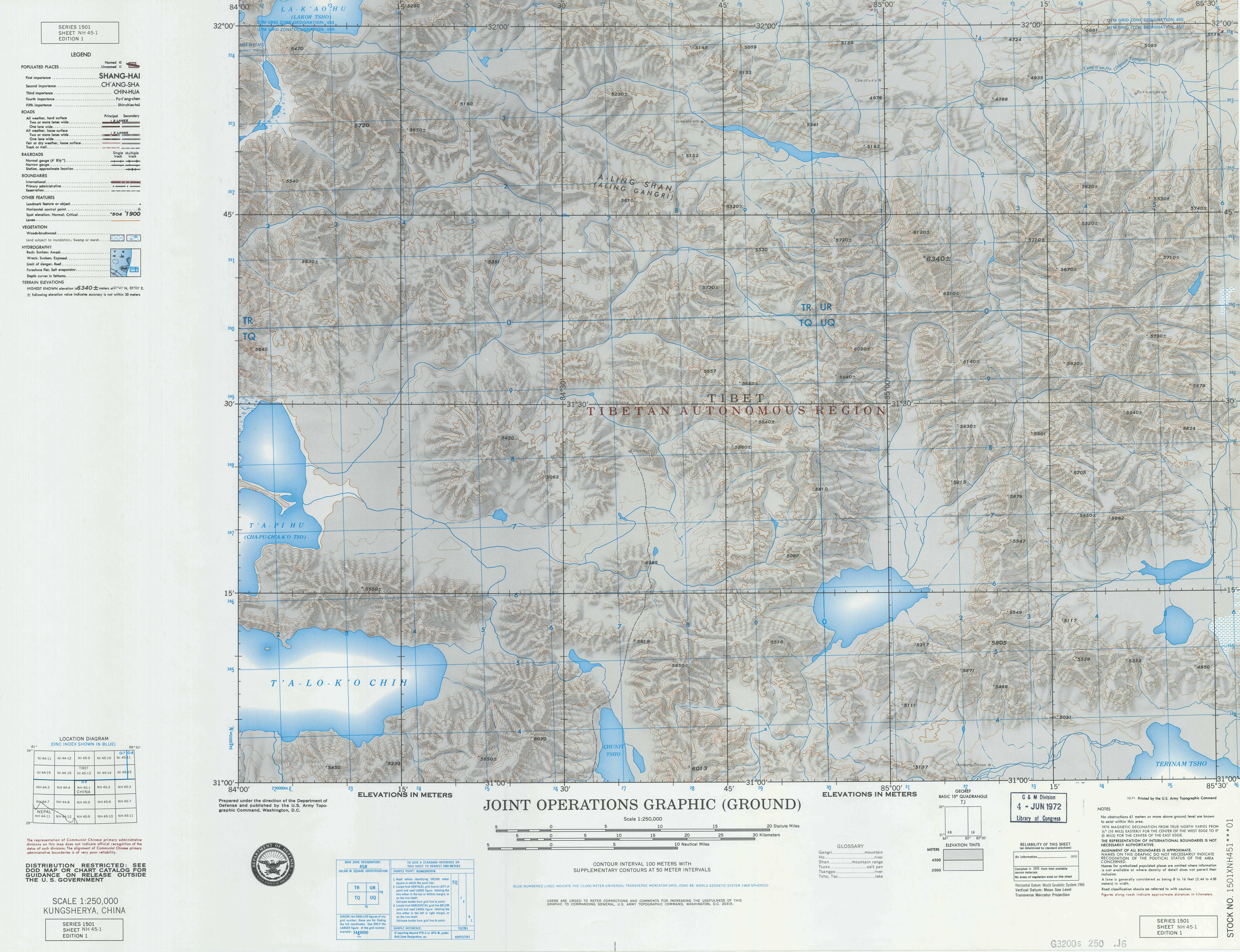
Maps of the modern-day Gêrzê County area, 1970s

== See also ==
- Chang Tang Nature Reserve
