= Xiuping Community, Yingxiu =

Xiuping Community 秀坪社区
- Residential Community
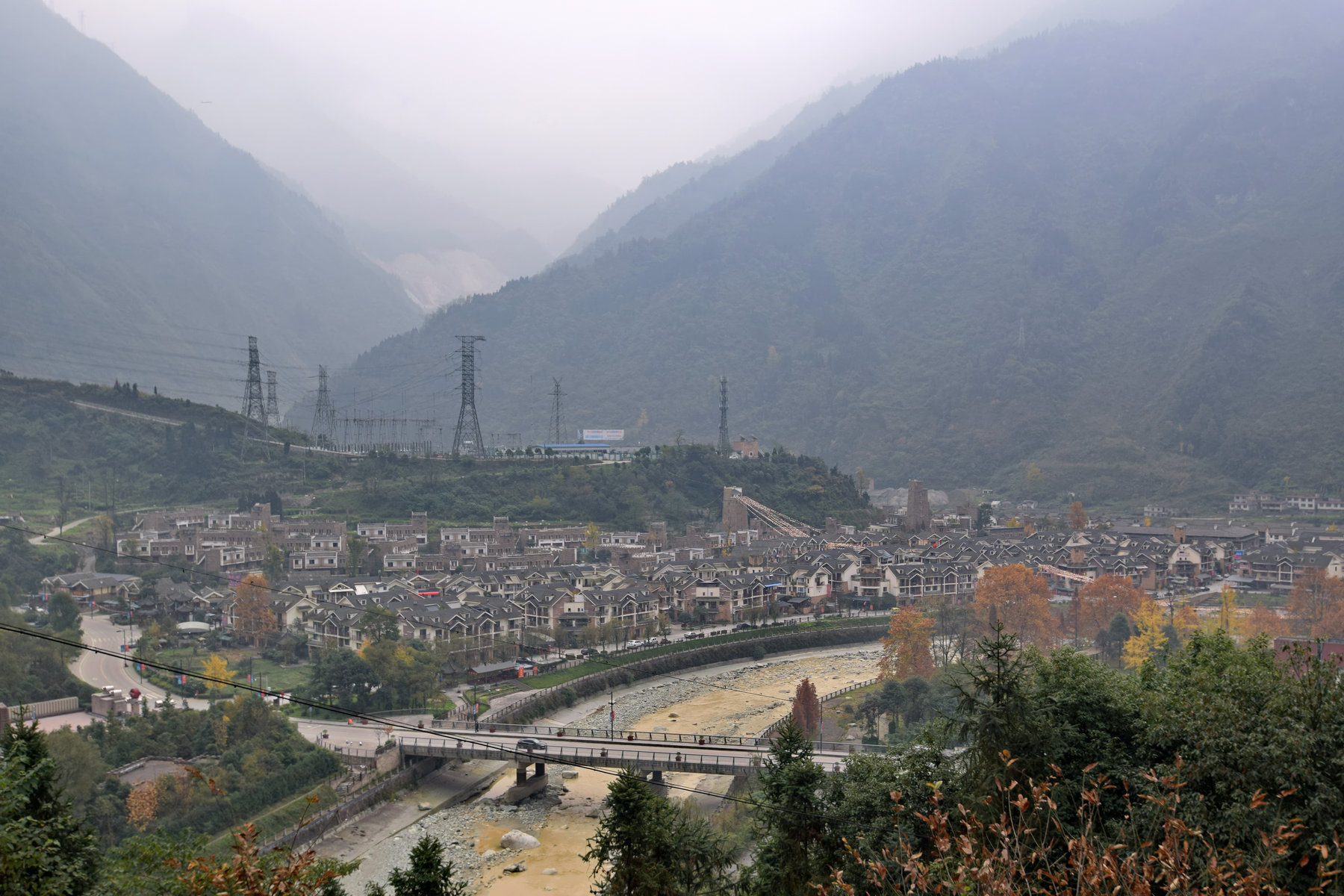
- An aerial view of Yingxiu in 2016, featuring many new constructions in Xiuping
- Country: China
- Province: Sichuan
- Autonomous prefecture: Ngawa Tibetan and Qiang Autonomous Prefecture
- County: Wenchuan County
- Town: Yingxiu

Population (2021)
  - Total: 4,156

Xiuping Community (simplified Chinese: 秀坪社区; traditional Chinese: 秀坪社區; pinyin: Xiùpíng Shèqū) is a residential community in Yingxiu, Wenchuan County, Ngawa Tibetan and Qiang Autonomous Prefecture, Sichuan, China. As of 2021, the community has a population of 4,156 people, residing in 1,469 households. Approximately 70% of Xiuping Community is ethnically Han, with the remaining 30% being predominantly Tibetan, Qiang, and Hui.

== History ==
Much of Xiuping Community was built following the 2008 Sichuan Earthquake, when the Wenchuan County government built 479 homes to resettle those displaced by the earthquake.

== Demographics ==
Approximately 70% of Xiuping Community is ethnically Han, with the remaining 30% being predominantly Tibetan, Qiang, and Hui.

Many who live in Xiuping Community work in government agencies, schools, and for private corporations.

== Culture ==
In January 2021, the Xiuping Community government opened an activity center for the community's elderly population.
