= Miyaluo, Sichuan =

Miyaluo 米亚罗镇
- Town
- Miyaluozhen
- Location in Sichuan
- Coordinates: 31°39′35″N 102°48′15″E
- Country: People's Republic of China
- Province: Sichuan
- Autonomous prefecture: Ngawa Tibetan and Qiang Autonomous Prefecture
- County: Li County
- Time zone: UTC+8 (China Standard)
- Postal code: 623102

Miyaluo (Mandarin: 米亚罗镇) is a town in Li County, Ngawa Tibetan and Qiang Autonomous Prefecture, Sichuan, China.
