= Southern Qiang language =

Qiangic Sino-Tibetan language

Southern Qiang
- Region: Sichuan Province
- Ethnicity: Qiang people
- Native speakers: (81,000 cited 1999)
- Language family: Sino-Tibetan: Tibeto-Burman; Qiangic; Qiang; Southern Qiang

Language codes
- ISO 639-3: qxs
- Glottolog: sout2728
- ELP: Southern Qiang

Southern Qiang is a Sino-Tibetan language of the Qiangic branch spoken by approximately 81,300 people along the Minjiang (Chinese: 岷江) river in Sichuan Province, China.

Southern Qiang dialects preserve archaic pronoun flexions, while they have disappeared in Northern Qiang. Unlike its close relative Northern Qiang, Southern Qiang is a tonal language.

== Southern Qiang dialects ==
Southern Qiang is spoken in Li County (in Taoping 桃坪, etc.), Wenchuan County (in Longxi 龙溪, Luobozhai 萝卜寨, Miansi 绵虒, etc.), and parts of Mao County. It consists of seven dialects: Dajishan, Taoping, Longxi, Mianchi, Heihu, Sanlong, and Jiaochang, which are greatly divergent and are not mutually intelligible.

Names seen in the older literature for Southern Qiang dialects include Lofuchai (Lophuchai, Lopu Chai) for Luobozhai (萝卜寨); Wagsod (Wa-gsod, Waszu) for Wasi (瓦寺) in modern-day Heping (河坪); and Outside/Outer Mantse (Man-tzŭ), likely from a term for "barbarians", from Chinese: 蠻子; pinyin: mánzǐ or from Tibetan སྨན་རྩེ (Wylie: sman tse).

The Southern Qiang dialect of Puxi Township has been documented in detail by Huang (2007). Liu (1998) adds Sānlóng (Chinese: 三龍) and Jiàocháng (較場) as Southern subdialects.

Sims (2016) characterizes Southern Qiang as the group that innovated the use of agreement suffixes in the perfective aspect, whereas Northern Qiang retains orientational prefixes as markers. These suffixes also provided the basis for classifying individual dialects, as highlighted below in italics.

Southern Qiang

- 'inward' *ji innovation subgroup
  - North Wenchuan: Longxi 龙溪乡
  - South Wenchuan: Miansi 绵虒镇
- 'downward' *ɚ innovation subgroup
  - Western Lixian: Puxi 蒲溪乡, Xuecheng 薛城镇, Muka 木卡乡, Jiuzi 九子村
  - Eastern Lixian: Taoping 桃坪乡, Tonghua 通化乡

== Phonology ==
The consonants of Southern Qiang are presented in the table below:

Southern Qiang consonants
		Labial	Dental		Retroflex	Palato- alveolar	Palatal	Velar	Uvular
		Labial	plain	sibilant	Retroflex	Palato- alveolar	Palatal	Velar	Uvular
Stop/ Affricate	voiceless	p	t	ts	ʈʂ	tʃ	tɕ	k	q
Stop/ Affricate	aspirated	pʰ	tʰ	tsʰ	ʈʂʰ	tʃʰ	tɕʰ	kʰ	qʰ
Stop/ Affricate	voiced	b	d	dz	ɖʐ	dʒ	dʑ	ɡ	ɢ
Fricative	voiceless	f		s	ʂ	ʃ	ɕ	(x)	χ
Fricative	voiced			z	ʐ	ʒ	ʑ	(ɣ)	ʁ
Nasal		m	n				ɲ	ŋ	
Approximant	plain		l				j		
Approximant	labial						ɥ	w	

- /χ ʁ/ are heard as velar [x ɣ] before front vowels.
- /f/ is also heard as a bilabial [ɸ].

The vowels of Southern Qiang are presented in the table below:

Southern Qiang vowels
	Front	Central	Back
Close	i y		u
Mid	e	ə ə˞	o
Open		a	ɑ
Syllabic		ɹ̩	

- Vowels /e u/ can also be heard as [ɛ ʉ].

=== Tones ===
Southern Qiang dialects have widely varying tones. The tones become more numerous and distinct the farther the dialect is from the Northern group. Evans (2001) lists the following tonal systems:

==== Taoping Qiang ====
The dialect of Taoping has six tones. Liu (1998) reports 4,900 speakers. Out of 1,754 analyzed syllables, the tones are distributed as follows:

- (33/Mid): 43.6%
- (55/High): 28.2%
- (31/Mid-falling): 19.2%
- (241/Low-rising-falling): 5.4%; occurs only with voiced initials
- (13/Low-rising): 2.5%; occurs only in Mandarin loanwords (from the fourth tone, realized as 25 locally) and in coalescence
- (51/High-falling): 1.2%; occurs only in Mandarin loanwords (from the third tone, realized as 53 locally)

==== Longxi Qiang ====
The dialect of Longxi has five tones, of which the two "major" tones make up 98.9% of the 6,150 analyzed syllables. Liu (1998) reports 3,300 speakers. The tones are distributed as follows on the analyzed syllables:

- (33~31/Mid~Mid-falling): 63.61%
- (55/High): 35.33%
- (13~213/Low(-falling)-rising): 0.70%; occurs only with voiced initials
- (35/Mid-rising): 0.31%; occurs only in loanwords and in coalesced syllables
- (51/High-falling): 0.05%; occurs only in coalesced syllables, loanwords, and with syllabified pre-initials

==== Mianchi Qiang ====
The dialect of Mianchi has 15,700 speakers according to Liu (1998). Its tones are added to a pitch-accent system of high and low(-falling) pitch, wherein native words may only have one accented syllable. A phonological word may be accented or unaccented, and the accent may for the most part occur on any syllable. Of the 6,369 syllables analyzed, over 95% follow this system; the remaining few have one of three contour tones:

- (31/Unaccented): 67.3%
- (55/Accented): 27.9%
- (13~213/Low(-falling)-rising): 3.5%
- (51/High-falling): 1.2%
- (35/Mid-rising): 0.01%; occurs only in loanwords and coalesced syllables

==== Other dialects ====
The dialects that border the Northern Qiang area, such as that of Heihu, Mao County, use tone exclusively to distinguish native words and loanwords.

Wen (1950) reports that the dialect of Jiuziying utilizes a pitch-accent system, claiming that "only when two or more syllables are in juxtaposition is a pitch-accent definitely required, especially for homophones." Below is a table comparing some vocabulary of the dialects of Jiuziying, Taoping, Longxi, and Mianchi.

Gloss	Jiuziying	Taoping	Longxi	Mianchi
last year	nɤ́ pɤ́	ȵi^{31} pǝ^{33}	nǝ́ pù	né pù
two years	nɤ̀ pɤ̀			
pheasant	í dzú	i^{31} dʑy^{241}	ỳ-zó	
friend	ì dzù		ì zù ~ ỳ zù	ì dʑòu
inside	kò kò	ko^{55} ko^{33}	kù kú	qò qó
elder brother	kó kò		à kò	qó qò
uncle	pà pá	pe^{33} pe^{33}	á pà	
father	pá pà	pɑ^{55} pɑ^{33}		

In the dialect of Hou'ergu, Li County, tones are variable on monosyllables depending on the directional prefix (e.g. sɹ̩^{31} t'ie^{53}; sɹ̩^{33} t'ie^{21}; dæ^{55} t'ie^{33}). However, tones are stable on polysyllables.

The tones of the Lobuzhai dialect often have variation in their pitch patterns (e.g. so^{31} ɲi^{31} ~ so^{33} ɲi^{33}), although this is not always the case.

== Status ==
As with many of the Qiangic languages, Southern Qiang is becoming increasingly threatened. Because the education system largely uses Standard Chinese as a medium of instruction for the Qiang people, and as a result of the universal access to schooling and television, most Qiang children are fluent or even monolingual in Chinese while an increasing percentage cannot speak Qiang.

== See also ==
- Qiang people
- Qiangic languages

== Bibliography ==
- Bradley, David (1997). "Tibeto-Burman Languages and Classification" (PDF). In Bradley, D. (ed.). Papers in South East Asian Linguistics No. 14: Tibeto-Burman Languages of the Himalayas. Canberra: Pacific Linguistics. pp. 1–72. ISBN 0-85883-456-1.
- Chang, Kun 張琨 (1967). "A Comparative Study of the Southern Ch'iang 蒐 Dialects". Monumenta Serica. 26 (1): 422–444. doi:10.1080/02549948.1967.11744974.
- Evans, Jonathan P. (2001a). Introduction to Qiang Lexicon and Phonology: Synchrony and Diachrony. Tokyo: ILCAA, Tokyo University of Foreign Studies.
