= Xuankou =

- Town

Chinese transcription(s)
  - Chinese: 漩口
  - Pinyin: Xuánkǒu
- Location in Sichuan
- Coordinates: 30°59′0″N 103°29′0″E
- Country: China
- Province: Sichuan
- Prefecture: Ngawa
- County: Wenchuan

Area
  - Total: 39.64 km^{2} (15.31 sq mi)

Population
  - Total: 12,000
  - Density: 300/km^{2} (780/sq mi)
- Time zone: UTC+8 (China Standard)

Xuankou (Chinese: 漩口; pinyin: Xuánkǒu) is a town located in Wenchuan County, Ngawa, Sichuan, China. The population is approximately 12,000, and is distributed roughly half urban and half rural. As of 2018, it has one residential community and 16 villages under its administration. The total area of the jurisdiction is 39.64 km (24.63 mi).

== 2008 Sichuan earthquake ==
Xuankou was one of the three most severely damaged areas of the 2008 Sichuan earthquake.
