= Yingxiu =

Yingxiu 映秀镇
- Town
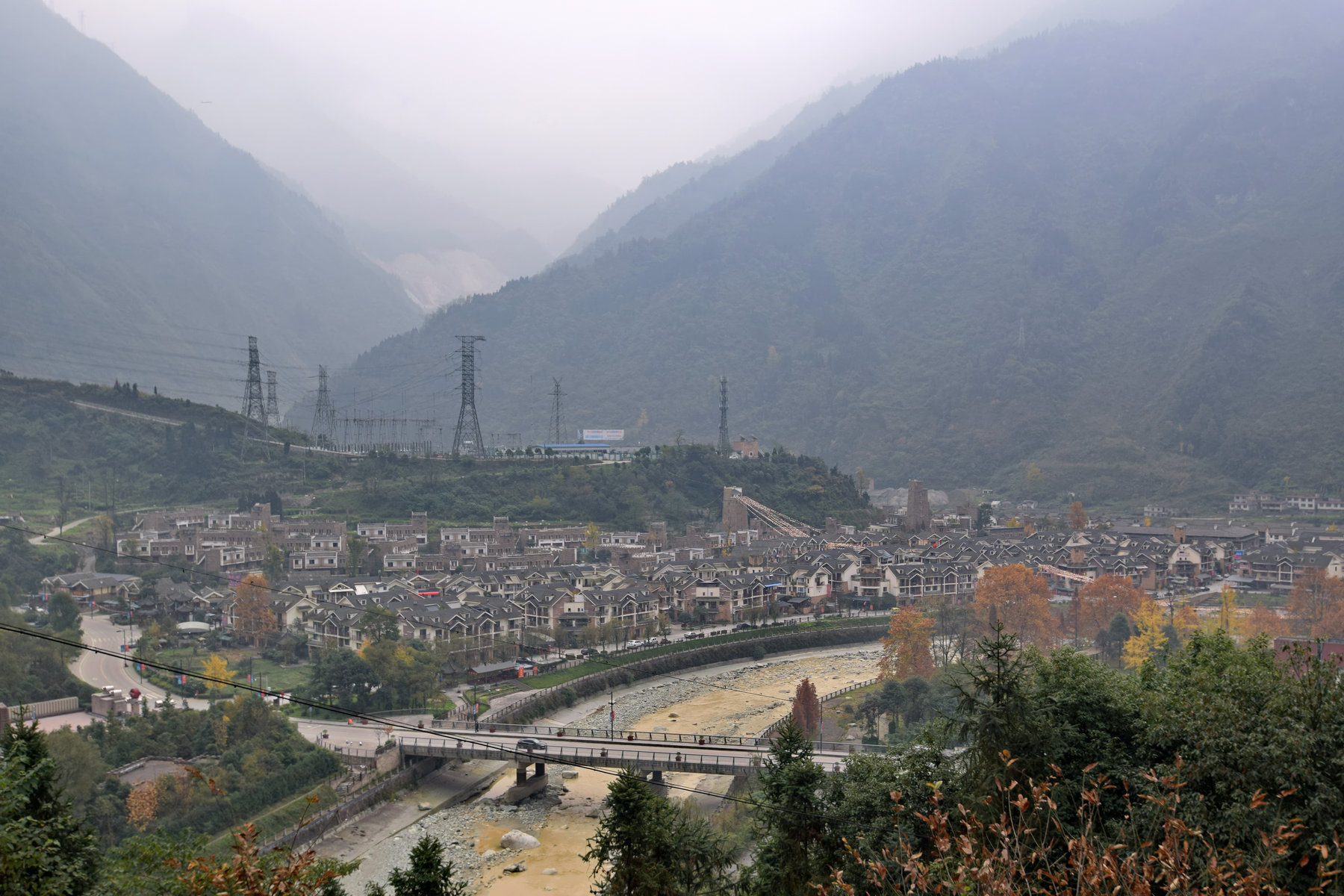
- Aerial view of Yingxiu, 2016

- Location in Sichuan
- Coordinates (Yingxiu Town government): 31°03′15″N 103°29′15″E
- Country: People's Republic of China
- Province: Sichuan
- Prefecture: Ngawa
- County: Wenchuan

Area
  - Total: 397.74 km^{2} (153.57 sq mi)
- Elevation: 900 m (3,000 ft)

Population (2021)
  - Total: 5,829
  - Density: 14.66/km^{2} (37.96/sq mi)
- Time zone: UTC+8 (China Standard)
- Postal code: 513221102

Yingxiu (Chinese: 映秀; pinyin: Yìngxiù) is a town of southern Wenchuan County, in central Sichuan Province. It is located at the southern end of the Ngawa Tibetan and Qiang Autonomous Prefecture, and lies on the road to Jiuzhaigou Valley, Wolong and the Siguniang Mountains. It is located 47 kilometres (29 mi) south of the county urban centre, and just 14 kilometres (8.7 mi) west of the city of Dujiangyan.

The town has an area of 397.74 square kilometres (153.57 mi^{2}), and a population of 5,829 people as of 2021. The town's average elevation is approximately 900 metres (3,000 ft) above sea level.

It is at the epicentre and one of the worst hit areas of the 2008 Sichuan earthquake. 80% of the town was destroyed and 5,462 people died. The collapsed Xuankou Middle School became one of the most memorable images of the disaster, and is now part of a memorial site.

Benevolence Square, a monument built by the Chinese government at the epicentre of the earthquake, contains a huge boulder lying below the surface and surrounded by a moat. A plaque, in Chinese and English, reads "Benevolence Square: It was arable land before the earthquake".

== History ==
Yingxiu was established as a people's commune in 1958.

In 1980, Yingxiu was changed to a township.

In 1984, Yingxiu was changed to a town, which it remains today.

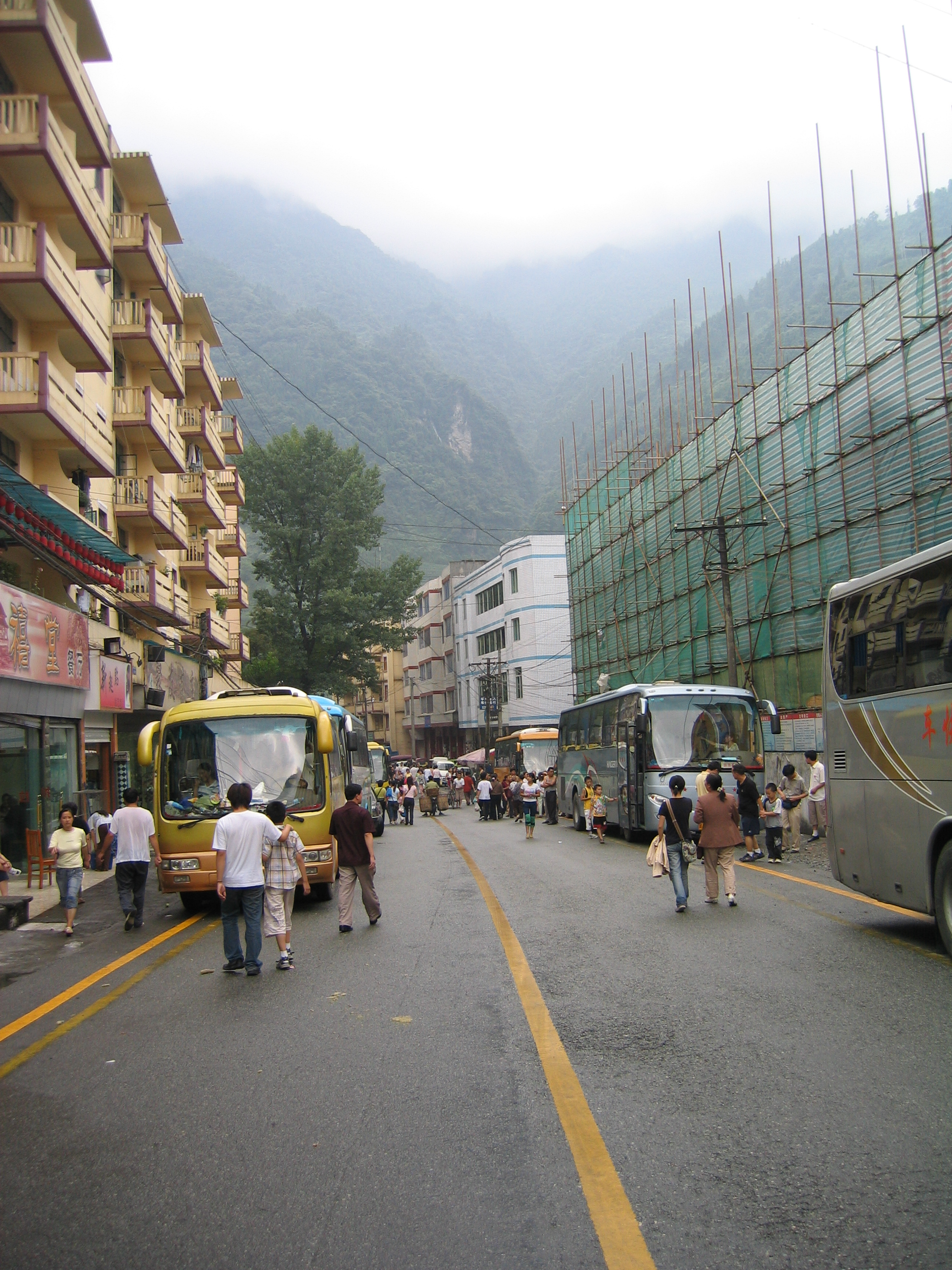
Street view of Yingxiu, July 2005

Following the 2008 Sichuan earthquake, the Wenchuan County government built 479 resettlement homes for families displaced by the earthquake, which now constitute part of Xiuping Community.

On December 18, 2019, Yinxing Township was merged into Yingxiu.

== Administrative divisions ==
Yingxiu is divided into one residential community and six administrative villages:

- Xiuping Community (Chinese: 秀坪社区)
- Zhongtanbao Village (Chinese: 中滩堡村)
- Yuzixi Village (Chinese: 渔子溪村)
- Huangjiayuan Village (Chinese: 黄家院村)
- Dongjienao Village (Chinese: 东界脑村)
- Yiwanshui Village (Chinese: 一碗水村)
- Taoguan Village (Chinese: 桃关村)

== Demographics ==
Historical population
Year	Pop.	±%
1996	7,000	—
2000	7,977	+14.0%
2007	6,906	−13.4%
2010	2,468	−64.3%
2019	2,644	+7.1%

The Wenchuan County government reports that, as of 2021, Yingxiu is home to 5,829 people, living in 1,999 households.

As of 2019, prior to the merger with Yinxing Township, the town was home to 2,644 people, living in 1,106 households. In the 2010 Chinese Census, the town's population was recorded at 2,468. This is a notable decline from 2007, when it was recorded to have a population of 6,906, and an even further decline from 2000, when the population was 7,977. A 1996 estimate placed the town's population at around 7,000 people.
