= Gengda Township =

Coordinates: 31.0944°N 103.3053°E

Gengda Township (耿达乡) is one of the two municipal units (the other is Wolong Town) in Wolong National Nature Reserve, Sichuan Province, China. Geographically Gengda Village and Wolong Town are located in Wenchuan County, Ngawa Tibetan and Qiang Autonomous Prefecture, Sichuan, People's Republic of China. The entire village is protected as a national nature reserve and under UNESCO World Heritage, Sichuan Giant Panda Sanctuaries.

== Villages ==
There are three villages in Gengda Township, named numerically. Gengda Township has seventeen groups in three villages. A small community is administratively called a group. A village is a larger community but smaller than a township. Each rural resident is registered with a specific group in a village.

== People ==
There is no accurate data on the history of Gengda's demographics. It is believed that Wolong has been settled since the Ming Dynasty (1368-1644 AD). During this period, it is estimated approximately 100 people inhabited the area. Up to 1658 (Qing Dynasty 1616-1911 AD), the population was around 300. The earliest demographic record shows there were 393 households with a total population of 1,656 (827 males and 829 females) were living in the township in 1935.
