= Lifan =

Lifan may refer to:

- Lifan Group, Chinese motorcycle and automobile manufacturer
- Lifan Yuan, agency in the Qing government for the administration of Mongolian and Tibetan Affairs
- Chongqing Lifan, Chinese football club
- Li County, Sichuan, formerly known as Lifan County
