= Longxi =

Longxi may refer to the following locations in China:

- Longxi Commandery, a historical prefecture from the Qin to the Tang dynasty
- Longxi County (陇西县), Gansu
- Longxi County, Fujian (龙溪县), former county, now part of Longhai City as Longhai District
- Longxi Station, station of Guangfo Metro Line 1 of Guangzhou Metro, Guangdong

Towns (龙溪镇)

- Longxi, Wushan County, Chongqing
- Longxi, Guangdong, in Boluo County
- Longxi, Guizhou, in Yuqing County
- Longxi, Shaoyang, in Wugang, Hunan
- Longxi, Jiangxi, in Linchuan District, Fuzhou
- Longxi, Shanxi, in Pingshun County

Townships (龙溪乡)

- Longxi Township, Chongqing, in Pengshui Miao and Tujia Autonomous County
- Longxi Township, Lezhi County, Sichuan
- Longxi Township, Wenchuan County, Sichuan
- Longxi Township, Yibin, in Pingshan County, Sichuan
- Longxi Township, Lishui, in Qingyuan County, Zhejiang
- Longxi Township, Tiantai County, Zhejiang
- Longxi Township, Yuhuan County, Zhejiang
