= Longxi Township, Wenchuan County =

Town in Sichuan, China

Coordinates: 31.5666°N 103.5359°E

Longxi Township is located at Wenchuan County, Ngawa Tibetan and Qiang Autonomous Prefecture, Sichuan Province, China.

According to the census conducted in 2000, the entire township had a population of 4903 people. It is located 15 kilometers from Weizhou Township, where the government of Wenchuan County is situated. Longxi Township lies in Longxi Valley, on the left bank of Zagunao River in Wenchuan County (approximately 103°32′ east longitude and 31°33′ north latitude). Farmland distributed on both sides of Longxi Valley.
