= Weizhou, Wenchuan County =

Weizhou 威州
- Town
- 威州镇
- Location in Sichuan province
- Coordinates: 31°28′40.39″N 103°35′09.70″E
- Country: China
- Province: Sichuan
- Prefecture: Ngawa
- County: Wenchuan

Area
  - Total: 128 km^{2} (49 sq mi)
- Elevation: 1,372 m (4,501 ft)

Population
  - Total: 31,409
  - Density: 245/km^{2} (636/sq mi)
- Time zone: UTC+8 (China Standard)

Weizhou (Chinese: 威州; pinyin: Wēizhōu; formerly known as Weichow or Weikiu) is a town and the county seat of Wenchuan County, northwestern Sichuan province, Southwestern China. The town has an area of 128 square kilometers and a population of 31,409.
