= Nangzhik Gompa =

Bon monastery in Ngawa Town, Sichuan, China

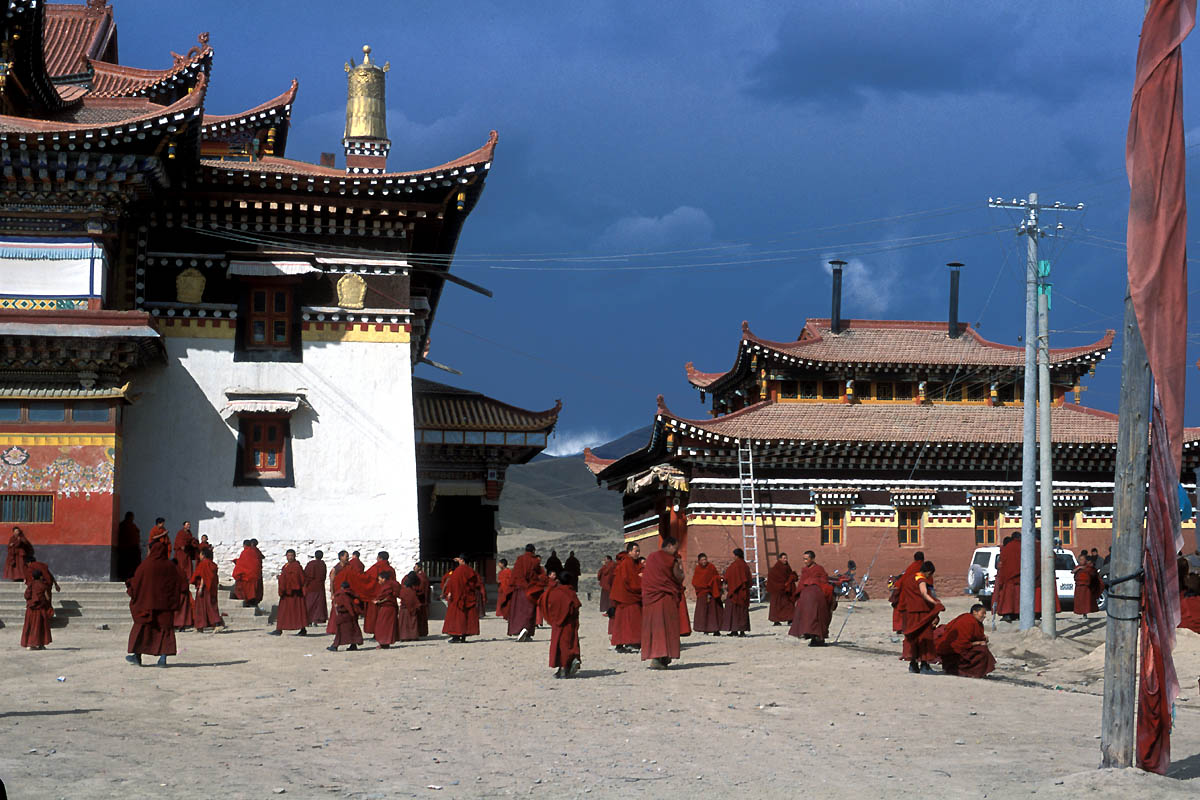
- Nangzhik Gompa or Narshi Monastery

- Location within Sichuan

Religion
- Affiliation: Bon
- Leadership: Home to 800 to 1000 monks

Location
- Location: Ngawa Tibetan and Qiang Autonomous Prefecture, Sichuan, China
- Interactive map of Nangzhik Gompa
- Coordinates: 32°56′6.9″N 101°43′37.92″E

Architecture
- Founder: Nangzhik Lodro Gyatso
- Completed: 1107; Renovated in 1754

Nangzhik Monastery (Wylie: snang zhig dgon, Chinese: 郎依寺, locally pronounced "Narshi" or "Nogi"), formerly known by several other names (Wylie: snang zhig rgyal bstan phun tshogs gling, snang zhig bkra shis g.yung drung gling, snang zhig phyogs las rnam rgyal bkra shis g.yung drung gling), is a monastery of the Bon religion in Amdo, modern Ngawa Town, Sichuan, China. It is about a 4 kilometres (2.5 mi) walk up a shortcut to reach the monastery on a hill to the north of the town. On a hill to the east is another Bon monastery named Togden or Topgyel which has a large stupa nearby.

== History ==
Founded in 1108 as Gyelten Püntsok Monastery (Wylie: rgyal bstan phun tshogs gling) by Nyimadzin (Wylie: Nyi ma ’dzin), it was moved to its present site in 1754. It is a large monastery with about 800-1000 monks, and it is said to be the biggest Bon monastery in Tibet. Nangzhik is a branch of Nogi (Duiansi) at Changla in Songpan County.

A history of the monastery was published in 1994.
