= Niu Yu =

Chinese disability advocate and earthquake survivor (born 1997)

- 牛钰
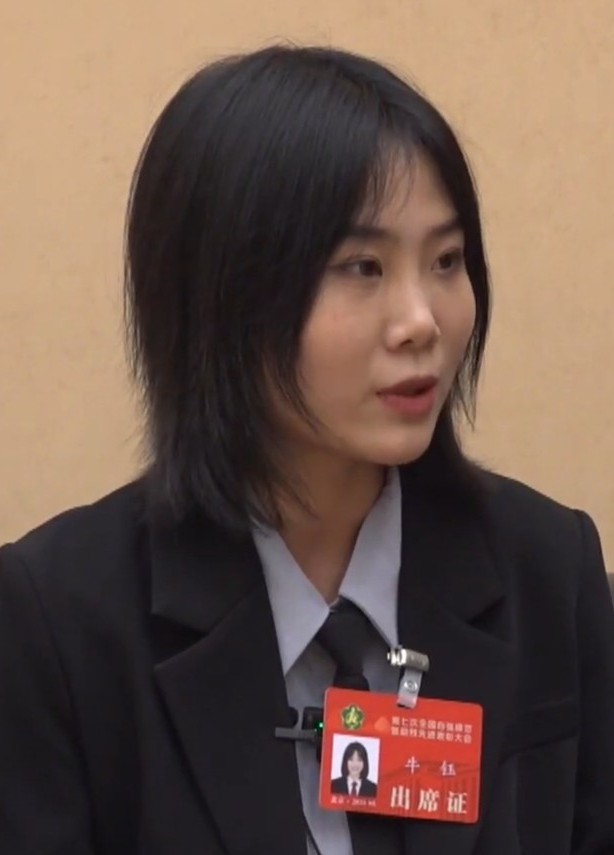
- Niu in 2025
- Born: 12 May 1997 (age 29); Mianyang, Sichuan, China
- Education: Southwestern University of Finance and Economics
- Occupations: Social media influencer, politician and disabilty rights advocate
- Employer: Communist Youth League of China

Chinese name
- Simplified Chinese: 牛钰
- Traditional Chinese: 牛鈺
Transcriptions
Standard Mandarin
- Hanyu Pinyin: Niú Yù

Niu Yu (Chinese: 牛钰; born 12 May 1997) is a Chinese disability advocate, social media influencer and politician. She gained national recognition after surviving the 2008 Wenchuan earthquake, during which she was trapped under rubble for three days and ultimately lost her right leg. She later became known as the "Steel-Leg Girl" (Note: (Chinese: 钢腿女孩; pinyin: Gāngtuǐ nǚ hái)) for her resilience and disability advocacy work.

== Early life ==
Of Qiang ethnicity, Niu was born in Mianyang, Sichuan, on 12 May 1997.

== Earthquake survivor ==
On 12 May 2008, on her eleventh birthday, Niu was attending Qushan Town Primary School in Beichuan Qiang Autonomous County when the magnitude 8.0 earthquake struck the region at 14:28:01 China Standard Time. The school building collapsed rapidly, trapping Niu and her classmates beneath the structural debris. She remained buried in total darkness under a heavy concrete slab for three days and three nights. At noon on 14 May, after nearly 70 hours trapped, she was momentarily awakened when a flashlight beam broke through the rubble. A rescue soldier had crawled into the unstable ruins, located her position and leaned over the slab to reassure her that help had arrived. Niu Yu later noted that the small light mounted on the soldier's helmet became her most concrete visual symbol of hope during the ordeal. On 15 May 2008, she was extracted from the debris, making her the final survivor rescued from the rubble of her school.

Upon arriving at the hospital, doctors determined that both of her legs had suffered severe tissue damage. To save her life, her parents consented to the amputation of her right leg. Over the following years, she underwent more than thirty surgeries to preserve the function of her left leg. Adjusting to life with a prosthetic leg proved extremely challenging. The physical pain of rehabilitation and the emotional struggle of adapting to her disability left her feeling isolated and self-conscious. She often concealed her prosthetic leg beneath clothing and avoided drawing attention to herself. Over time, however, she gradually regained confidence and learned to embrace her identity. Niu has stated that she returns to Beichuan every year on 12 May to honor relatives, friends and classmates who lost their lives in the earthquake.

== Advocacy career ==
After gaining public attention, she developed an interest in photography and began documenting the lives of people with disabilities. She later established a social media presence under the online name 'Spring Outing' (Note: (Chinese: 春游; pinyin: Chūnyóu)), where she shares information about prosthetic limbs, discusses phantom limb pain and promotes disability awareness. She has also spoken at schools and public events, encouraging young people and individuals facing adversity.

In 2018, on the tenth anniversary of the Wenchuan earthquake, Niu participated in the inaugural Wenchuan Marathon. Initially intending to run only a short distance, she ultimately continued much farther than planned. Encouragement from fellow runners transformed her perspective on her disability. Niu later described her scars not as symbols of tragedy, but as evidence of survival, resilience and the support she received from countless people. The experience marked a turning point in her life and helped her fully accept herself. Niu has also spoken at schools and public events, encouraging young people and individuals facing adversity. In March 2019, she appeared on the Chinese television talent show Golden 100 Seconds.

In October 2021, she attracted national attention after walking the runway at Shanghai Fashion Week with her prosthetic leg. In February 2022, Niu contributed an essay to Vogue China's Body Language series, in which she reflected on losing her right leg in the earthquake, her struggles with self-acceptance and her decision to stop concealing her prosthetic limb. She described her prosthetic leg as a "badge of honor" symbolizing resilience and survival. In May 2026, she published an article in People's Daily titled 'If One Refuses to Yield, One Becomes a Mountain' (Note: (Chinese: 人若不屈，便是高山; pinyin: Rénruò bùqū, biànshì gāoshān)).

== Political and public service career ==
In 2023, Niu was elected as a deputy to the 14th Sichuan Provincial People's Congress. The same year, she participated in the torch relay for the 2021 Summer World University Games in Chengdu and competed in the Shanghai Women's Half Marathon.

She currently serves as a part-time Deputy Secretary of the Communist Youth League of China Committee of Mianyang and also as a representative of the 14th Sichuan Provincial People's Congress.

== Personal life ==
Niu graduated from Tianfu College of Southwestern University of Finance and Economics.

In July 2022, while traveling, Niu's prosthetic leg became trapped in a rock crevice and she received assistance from local firefighters. She later reunited with one of the firefighters during a Chengdu Fire Rescue livestream event. The two became friends and eventually entered a romantic relationship.

In March 2023, Niu publicly revealed that she had been subjected to online harassment and abusive messages. Responding to the attacks, she emphasized the importance of self-confidence and encouraged others not to allow outsiders to define their worth.

== Honors ==
- Sichuan Youth May Fourth Medal (2022)
- China Good Person Award – Helping Others Category (2024)
- National Model of Self-Reliance (2025)
