= Qiang people =

Ethnic group of China

Qiang
Ch'iang, Chiang-Min, Erma
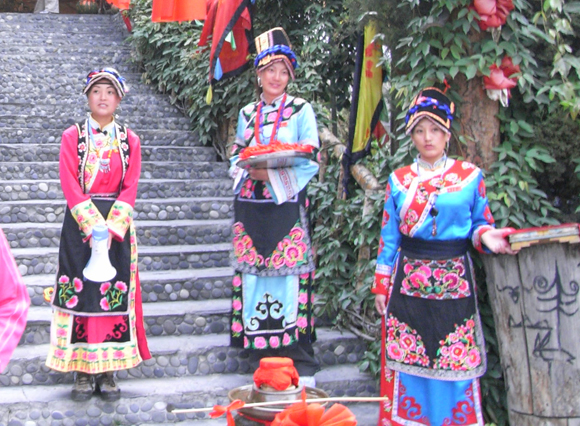

Total population
- 312,981 (2020 census)

Regions with significant populations
- Guizhou, Sichuan, Yunnan: 300,000

Languages
- Qiangic languages, Standard Chinese

Religion
- Qiang folk religion, Taoism, Tibetan Buddhism, Christianity

Qiang people

Qiangic name
- Qiangic: Rrmea

The Qiang people (Qiangic: Rrmea; Chinese: 羌族; pinyin: Qiāngzú) are an ethnic group in China. They form one of the 56 ethnic groups officially recognised by the People's Republic of China, with a population of approximately 312,981 in 2020. They live mainly in a mountainous region in the northwestern part of Sichuan (Szechwan) on the eastern edge of the Tibetan Plateau.

== Names ==
The modern Qiang refer to themselves as Rma (/ɹmæː/ or /ɹmɛː/, 尔玛, erma in Chinese or RRmea in Qiang orthography) or a dialect variant of this word. However, they did not define themselves with the Chinese term "Qiang ethnicity" (Chinese: 羌族) until 1950, when they were officially designated Qiāngzú.

Qiang has been a term that has historically referred less to a specific community, but more to the fluid western boundary of Han Chinese settlers. Chinese philosophers of the Warring States period also mentioned a 'Di-Qiang' peoples living on the western edge of Han territory. They were known for their customs of cremation.

== History ==
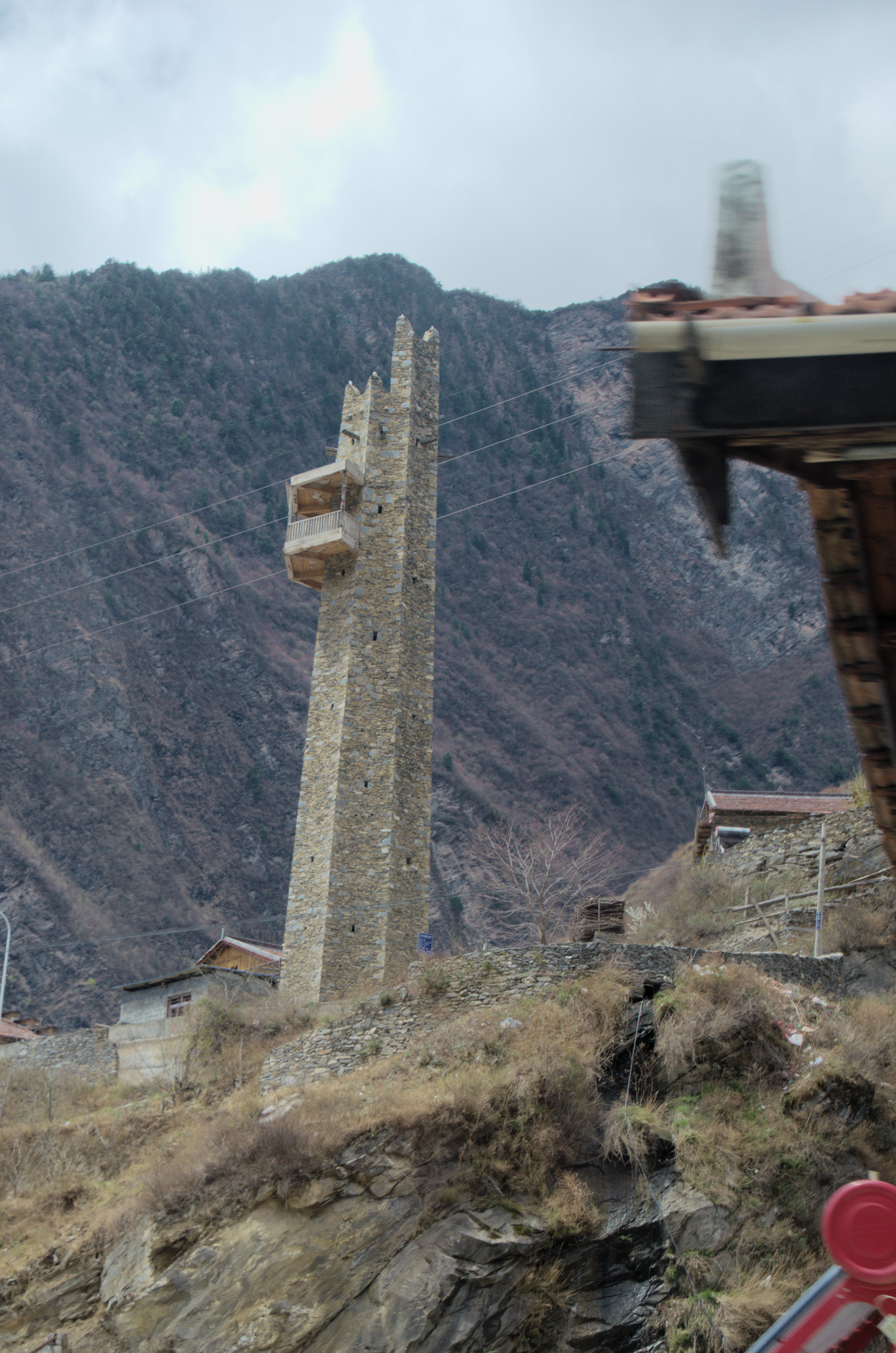
Qiang watchtower

People called "Qiang" have been mentioned in ancient Chinese texts since they first appeared in oracle bone inscriptions 3,000 years ago. Recognized as a 'first ancestor culture', there is evidence of the Qiang in northwestern China dating back to the 16th-11th centuries B.C., when they were recorded bringing tribute to the Shang Dynasty. They were primarily known to practice pastoral nomadism, and resisted westward expansion of the Han Empire, gradually shifting to the south-west of their ancestral lands.

However, the name Qiang has been applied to a variety of groups that might not be the same as the modern Qiang. Many of the people formerly designated as "Qiang" were gradually removed from this category in Chinese texts as they become sinicised or reclassified. By the Ming dynasty, the term "Qiang" denoted only non-Han people living in the upper Min River Valley and Beichuan area, the area now occupied by the modern Qiang. Nonetheless, most modern scholarship assumes that modern Qiang are descended from the historical Qiang people.

During the wars centering on the 1580s, the term "Qiang" or less often "Qiang Fan" was increasingly applied to areas in the southern sections of the Upper Min valley that are identified as Qiang today; and in the same materials the term "Fan" was used for areas to the north and east that are today Zang (Tibetan). The ruins reported by Western travellers in the early 20th century testify to the violence of that official repression. We suggest that the origins of the modern Qiang, who for the past four centuries have cast their lot with Chinese rulers more readily than the people of Shar khog, may be sought in the Ming, beginning with Chinese in-migration at Maozhou in the 15th century and culminating in the violence upriver in the 1580s.

— Xiaofei Kang, Donald S. Sutton

Analysis of Han and Western (European) scholarly sources reveals that in the first half of the twentieth century, there was no coherent 'Qiang' culture in the Upper Min Valley of northwestern Sichuan. Rather, there existed a plethora of inhabited regions with settlers of individual communities identifying themselves as rma. A significant cultural variation was observed even among neighboring communities. In particular, Han and Tibetan influences were prevalent in those rural communities.

When Qiang was officially designated an ethnic group in 1950, they numbered only 35,600. Many sought to gain Qiang status due to government policy of prohibition of discrimination as well as economic subsidies for minority nationalities. As a result, the Qiang population has increased due to the reclassification of people. From 1982 to 1990, 75,600 people changed back their ethnicity to Qiang, and from 1990 to 2000, 96,500 retook their ethnic identity as Qiang. Another 49,200 people reclaimed their Qiang ethnicity from 1982 to 1989. In total, some 200,000 people returned to their real Qiang ethnic identity from wrongly classified as Han. As a result, there were 300,000 Qiang people in 2010, 200,000 of which lived in Sichuan, predominantly in the Ngawa Tibetan and Qiang Autonomous Prefecture, Beichuan Qiang Autonomous County and in the counties of Mao, Wenchuan, Li, Heishui, and Songpan.

=== 2008 Sichuan earthquake ===
On 12 May 2008, the Qiang people were heavily affected by the 8.0 magnitude earthquake as over 30,000 Qiang Tibetic people were killed (10 percent of the total Qiang population). Major restoration efforts were made in the A'er village, one of the few remaining centers of Qiang culture, by the Beijing Cultural Heritage Protection Center (CHP). Specifically, preservation of the Qiang languages (which have no written form) was of concern, and several recording repositories were made to preserve the tales remembered only by the shibi or duangongs. Restoration attempts were made in consideration of the 1989 UNESCO Recommendation on the Safeguarding of Traditional Culture and Folklore, and ensured maximum participation of the local inhabitants, the custodians of the culture that was being preserved. The A'er stone tower, of particular significance, was carefully restored in 2012 by the A'er villagers themselves using authentic materials and techniques.

== Languages ==
The Qiang speak the agglutinative Qiangic languages, a subfamily of the Tibeto-Burman languages. However, Qiang dialects are so different that communication between different Qiang groups is often in Mandarin. There are numerous Qiang dialects; traditionally they are split into two groups, Northern Qiang and Southern Qiang, although in fact the Qiang language complex is made up of a large number of dialectal continua which cannot be easily grouped into Northern or Southern. The education system largely uses Standard Chinese as a medium of instruction for the Qiang people, and as a result of the universal access to schooling and TV, very few Qiang cannot speak Chinese but many Qiang cannot speak Qiangic languages.

Until recently, there was no script for the Qiang language, and the Qiang used a system of carving marks on wood to represent events or communicate. In the late 1980s a writing system was developed for the Qiang language based on the Qugu (曲谷) variety of a Northern dialect using the Latin alphabet. The introduction has not been successful due to the complexities of the Qiang sound system and the concomitant difficulty of its writing system, as well as the diversity of the Qiang dialects and the lack of reading material. The Qiang also use Chinese characters. More recently, a unique script has been developed specifically for Qiang, known as the Qiang or Rma script.

== Culture and religion ==
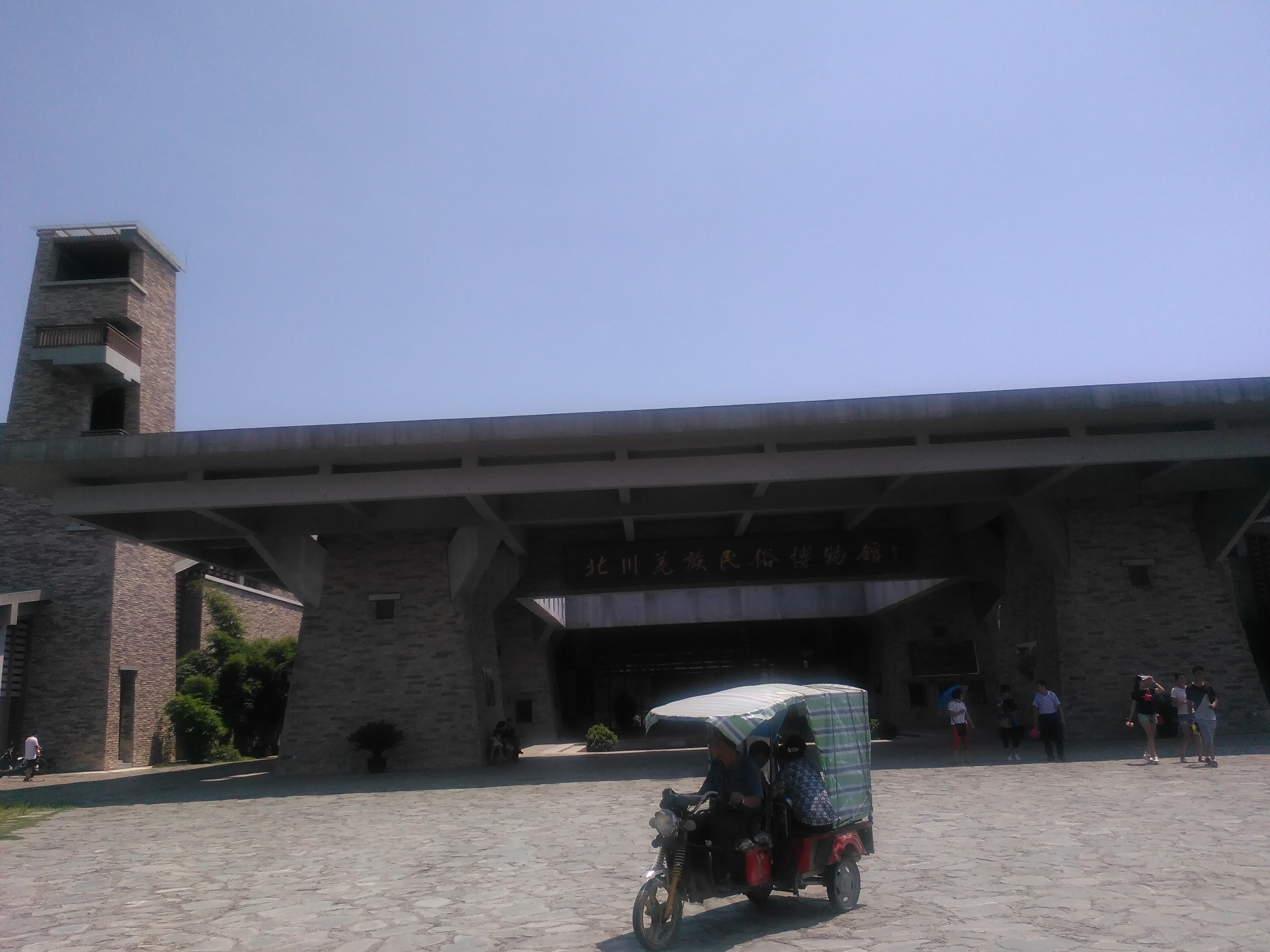
Qiang Ethnic Minority Folklore Museum in Beichuan

As a result of their geographic location on the periphery of Tibetan and Han majorities Qiang culture is a unique amalgamation of their own religions and Han, Tibetan, Muslim, and Christian influences. This attests to the significant intra-diversity of the Qiang people, a phenomenon caused almost exclusively by the linguistic barriers and topographical difficulty of the regions they inhabit.

The majority of the Qiang adhere to a pantheistic religion involving guardian mountain deities. Several nearby villages may share a higher-level mountain deity out of proximity. These deities served not just as religious idols, but practical protections of resource rights and territorial boundaries in a region of severe resource competition.

Generally, there is a spectrum spanning from the Eastern edge of the historical Tibetan Kingdoms to the Han Empire – those who live nearer to the Tibetans (northwest) exhibit more elements of Tibetan Buddhism, while Han Chinese culture prevails among those living in the south and east. Due to this, the mountain deities worshiped as village guardians became part of the lowest level of the western Tibetan Buddhist pantheon, while Taoism and Chinese Buddhism temples encroached upon the culture to the east. In eastern temples, mountain deities have disappeared entirely, with religious practice practically indistinguishable from the Han Chinese.

In regards to their local religions, the Qiang practice a form of animism, worshiping nature gods and ancestral spirits, and specific white stones (often placed atop watchtowers) are worshiped as representatives of gods. Villages worship five great deities and twelve lesser ones, though the pantheon consists of gods of equal importance dedicated to almost every social function. However, there is considered to be one supreme Abamubita (God of Heaven).

In Qiang villages, the culture is remembered and practice primarily by the duangong, known as bi in the Qiang language. As keepers of the culture, these village shamans hold great importance in the preservation of Qiang heritage. Though there is no gender limitation, no female duangongs exist currently. They are also keepers of the two most important symbols of Qiang religion, known as the duangong's tools: the sheepskin drum and a preserved monkey skull, known as the AbaMullah.

Duangongs function as priests, scholars, medicine men and village elders all rolled into one. Though they live ordinary everyday lives, serving regular social functions as part of the village community, their possession of the duangong tools demarcates their explicit importance to the village's spiritual culture. Almost all ceremonies, ranging from funerals to healing rituals are performed by the duangong. They are believed to have mysterious powers which allow them to be in constant communication with the world of spirits and ghosts, and thus straddle the line between healer and wizard. Important to note, however, is that the duangong does not earn his living from his status, but as a worker of whatever trade he chooses. Another key difference between duangongs in Qiang culture and the idea of the 'shaman' is that while shamans are 'chosen by the gods', anyone can become a duangong given the appropriate training.

To become a duangong, one must pass the gaigua, an initiation/graduation ceremony where the individual is confirmed in their position by the village and receives their own set of duangong tools; the monkey skin hat, sheepskin drum, holy stick, and AbaMullah, often handed down over fifteen generations. However, the turbulences of China's Cultural Revolution led to the disappearance of many tools, with no shaman currently in possession of a full set. These disappearances are primarily attributed to confiscation by Chinese government search teams in pursuit of Chinese national modernization. However, several tools are postulated to have been hidden away by villagers in an attempt to preserve Qiang possession of their historical artifacts.

For most Qiang villages, consecrated white stones, believed to be imbued with powers of the gods through certain rituals, are placed on the top of towers as a good luck symbols. These squared stone towers are traditionally located on the edge of Qiang villages and on the top of nearby hills as well.

== Lifestyle ==
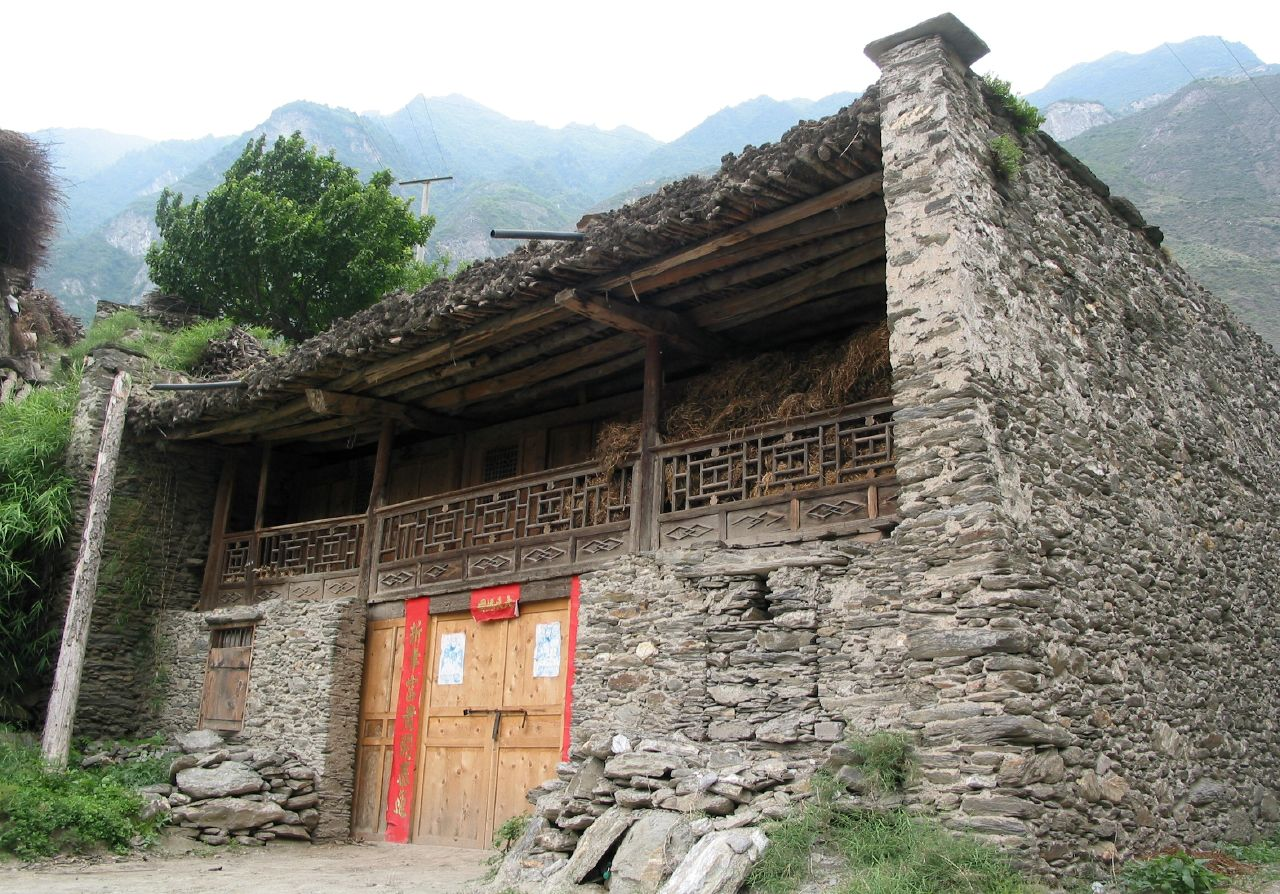
A traditional Qiang house in Baodinggou nature reserve, Maoxian, Sichuan.

The Qiang today are mountain dwellers. A fortress village, zhai 寨, composed of 30 to 100 households, in general, is the basic social unit beyond the household. An average of two to five fortress villages in a small valley along a mountain stream, known in local Chinese as gou 沟, make up a village cluster (cun 村). The inhabitants of fortress village or village cluster have close contact in social life. In these small valleys, people cultivate narrow fluvial plains along creeks or mountain terraces, hunt animals or collect mushrooms and herbs (for food or medicine) in the neighboring woods, and herd yaks and horses on the mountain-top pastures.

In terms of subsistence and diet, northwestern displayed greater reliance on animal husbandry than agriculture, thus consuming more dairy and meat products. Meanwhile, southeastern settlers favor agricultural practices, resulting in greater consumption of grains and wheat. This northwest to southwest gradient is observable in many aspects of Qiang culture due to their geographic location between two distinct (relative) majority cultures.

The Qiang constructed watchtowers and houses with thick stone walls and small windows and doors. Each village may have had one or more stone towers in the past, and these Himalayan Towers still survive in some Qiang villages and remain a distinctive feature in these villages. Though Qiang villages historically served as fortified settlements with several defense mechanisms, these functions were lost over time. The Communist government's 1949 establishment saw the removal of defense installations as part of a national unity policy. Villagers live in granite stone houses generally consisting of two to three stories. The first floor is meant for keeping livestock and poultry, while the second floor is meant for the living quarters, and the third floor for grain storage. If the third floor does not exist, the grains will be kept on the first or second floor instead.

Sheep are considered particularly sacred in Qiang culture, as they are the source of much of a village's livelihood. As such, wool is the primary material of which clothing is made. Both the menfolk and womenfolk wear gowns made of gunny cloth, cotton, and silk with sleeveless wool jackets. White is particularly sacred as a color among the Qiang. Due to the harsh climate of their lands, the Qiang have developed clothing to adapt to it. A common dress is the "Yangpi Gua" (a kind of sleeveless jacket made of sheepskin or goatskin), and bind puttees to protect against the cold weather. Additionally, they are known to wear the "Tou Pa" (cloth head coverings) around head, waistband, tie an apron around one's waist, and wear "Yunyun Shoe" (a sharp-pointed and embroidered shoes with typical Qiang characteristics). The dress, especially, women's dress, is trimmed with lace and their collars are decorated with silver ornaments.

Millet, highland barley, potatoes, winter wheat, and buckwheat serve as the staple food of the Qiang. Consumption of wine and smoking of orchid leaves are also popular among the Qiang.

Skilled in construction of roads and bamboo bridges, the Qiang can build them on the rockiest cliffs and swiftest rivers. Using only wooden boards and piers, these bridges can stretch up to 100 meters. Others who are excellent masons are good at digging wells. Especially during poor farming seasons, they will visit neighboring places to do chiseling and digging.

Embroidery and drawn work are done extemporaneously without any designs. Traditional songs related to topics such as wine and the mountains are accompanied by dances and the music of traditional instruments such as leather drums.

== Genetic origin ==
Genetic evidence reveals a predominantly Northern Asian-specific component in Qiangic populations, especially in maternal lineages. The Qiangic populations are an admixture of the northward migrations of East Asian initial settlers with Tibetan related Y chromosome haplogroup D (D1-M15 and the later originated D3a-P47) in the late Paleolithic age, and the southward Di-Qiang people with dominant haplogroup O3a2c1*-M134 and O3a2c1a-M117 in the Neolithic Age.

A major ancestral component in Qiangic populations is related to the Tibetans, with the rest of their ancestral components being related to southern East Asians such as Dai and Atayal. Qiangic populations also exhibit affinities with the historic Xiongnu and Mongolians. Overall, they cluster with neighboring groups such as Yi, Tu, and Tibetans.

== Notable people ==
- Niu Yu, politician and 2008 Sichuan earthquake survivor

== See also ==
- Northern Qiang language
- Southern Qiang language
