= Li County, Sichuan =

Li County 理县 · ལིས་རྫོང་། · Bez Lixian
- County
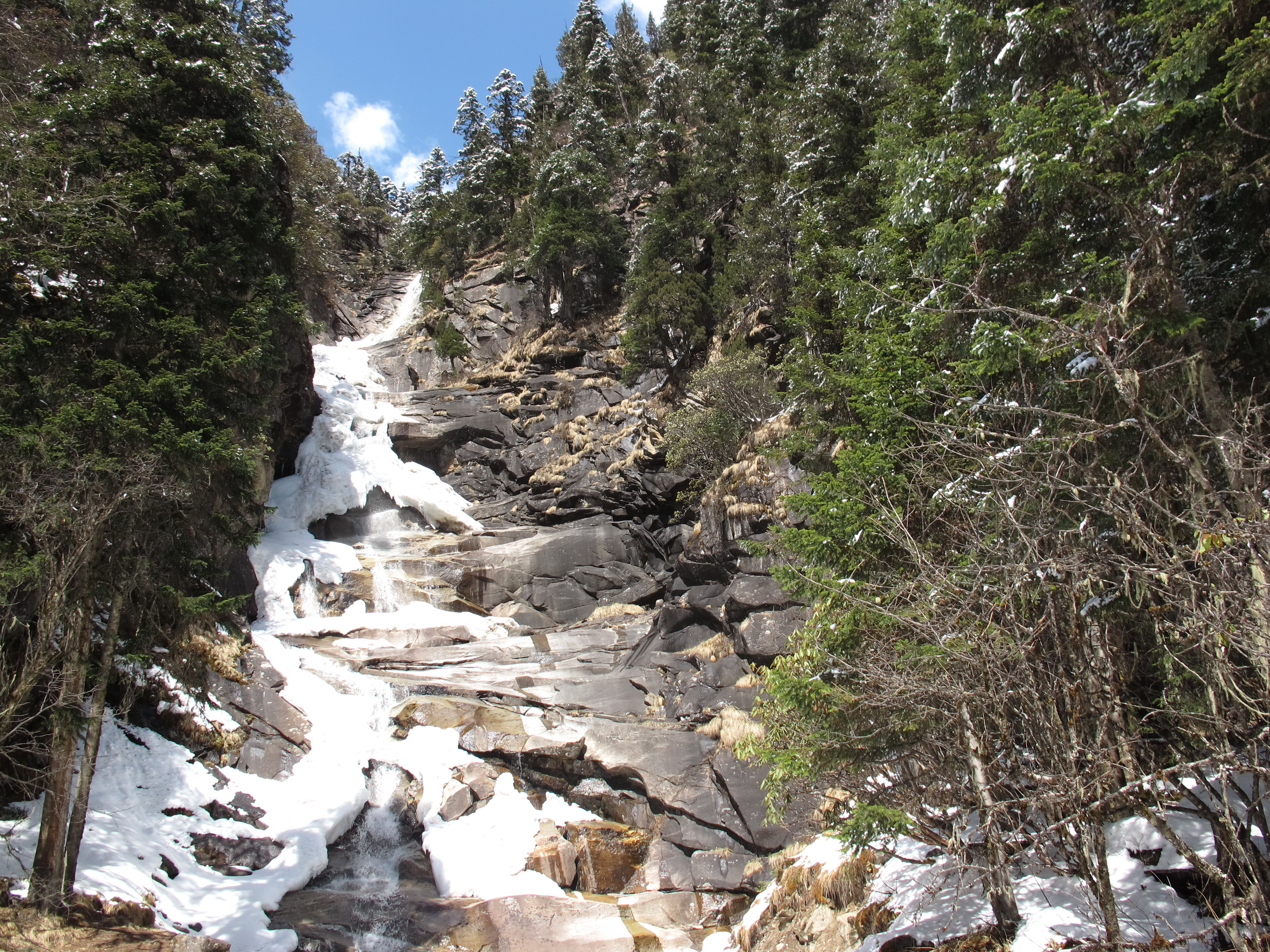
- Bailong Waterfall in Bipenggou, Li County

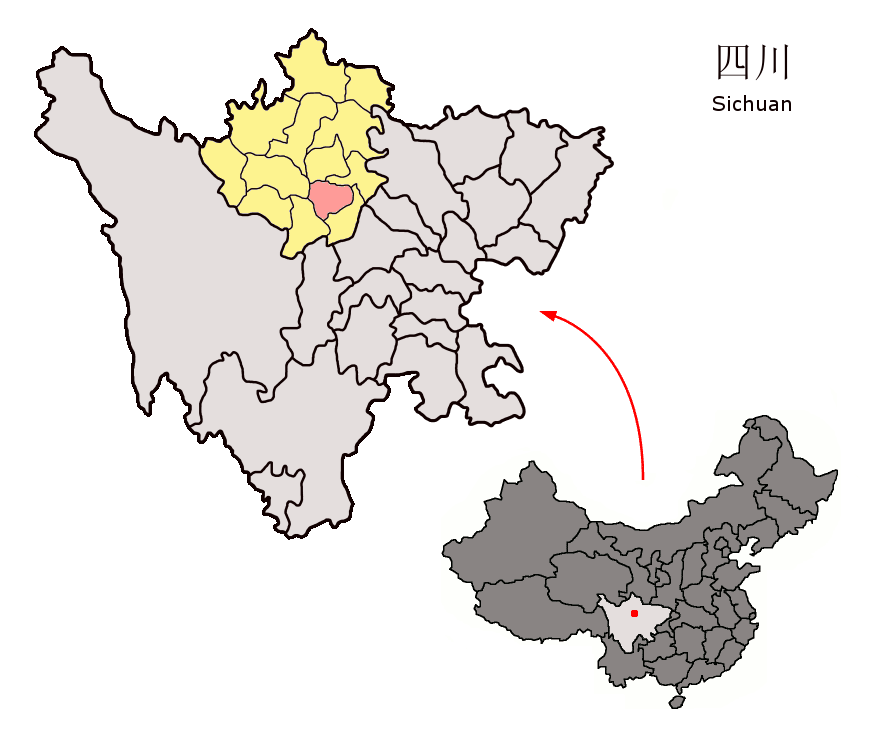
- Li County (red) in Ngawa Prefecture (yellow) and Sichuan province

- Location of the seat in Sichuan Li County (China)
- Coordinates (Li County government): 31°26′09″N 103°09′48″E
- Country: China
- Province: Sichuan
- Autonomous prefecture: Ngawa
- County seat: Zhaxiling (Zagunao)

Area
  - Total: 4,318 km^{2} (1,667 sq mi)

Population (2020)
  - Total: 36,926
  - Density: 8.552/km^{2} (22.15/sq mi)
  - Major nationalities: Tibetan - 53.43% Qiang - 33.50% Han - 12.46% Hui - 0.41%
- Time zone: UTC+8 (China Standard)
- Website: www.ablixian.gov.cn

Li County, Sichuan

Chinese name
- Simplified Chinese: 理县
- Traditional Chinese: 理縣
Transcriptions
Standard Mandarin
- Hanyu Pinyin: Lǐ Xiàn

Tibetan name
- Tibetan: ལིས་རྫོང་།
Transcriptions
- Wylie: lis rdzong
- Tibetan Pinyin: Li Zong

Qiang name
- Qiang: Bez

Li County or Lixian (Chinese: 理县; Tibetan: ལིས་རྫོང་།; Qiang: pauɕuq), formerly known as Lifan (理番), is a county in Ngawa Tibetan and Qiang Autonomous Prefecture, Sichuan, China. China National Highway G317 and the Zhaxiling River run through the whole territory.

On May 12, 2008, the area was affected by the 2008 Sichuan earthquake.

== Geography ==
Li County is located from 30°54′43″N 102°32′46″E (30.911944°, 102.546111°) to 31°12′12″N 103°30′30″E (31.203333°, 103.508333°).

== Climate ==
Climate data for Lixian, elevation 1,897 m (6,224 ft), (1991–2020 normals, extremes 1981–present)
Month	Jan	Feb	Mar	Apr	May	Jun	Jul	Aug	Sep	Oct	Nov	Dec	Year
Record high °C (°F)	20.9 (69.6)	30.4 (86.7)	31.7 (89.1)	32.0 (89.6)	33.4 (92.1)	34.6 (94.3)	35.8 (96.4)	36.4 (97.5)	33.6 (92.5)	27.6 (81.7)	24.4 (75.9)	19.5 (67.1)	36.4 (97.5)
Mean daily maximum °C (°F)	6.8 (44.2)	10.8 (51.4)	15.4 (59.7)	20.6 (69.1)	23.1 (73.6)	24.8 (76.6)	27.3 (81.1)	27.5 (81.5)	23.2 (73.8)	18.2 (64.8)	13.4 (56.1)	8.1 (46.6)	18.3 (64.9)
Daily mean °C (°F)	1.0 (33.8)	3.9 (39.0)	8.1 (46.6)	12.7 (54.9)	15.8 (60.4)	18.2 (64.8)	20.6 (69.1)	20.6 (69.1)	17.1 (62.8)	12.3 (54.1)	7.2 (45.0)	2.2 (36.0)	11.6 (53.0)
Mean daily minimum °C (°F)	−3.1 (26.4)	−0.5 (31.1)	3.3 (37.9)	7.4 (45.3)	10.8 (51.4)	13.9 (57.0)	16.1 (61.0)	16.1 (61.0)	13.3 (55.9)	8.7 (47.7)	3.2 (37.8)	−1.8 (28.8)	7.3 (45.1)
Record low °C (°F)	−11.0 (12.2)	−10.9 (12.4)	−7.9 (17.8)	−0.5 (31.1)	3.2 (37.8)	7.2 (45.0)	9.3 (48.7)	7.4 (45.3)	5.2 (41.4)	−0.2 (31.6)	−5.3 (22.5)	−12.1 (10.2)	−12.1 (10.2)
Average precipitation mm (inches)	7.5 (0.30)	12.4 (0.49)	34.1 (1.34)	62.2 (2.45)	96.8 (3.81)	108.1 (4.26)	76.2 (3.00)	68.8 (2.71)	78.3 (3.08)	63.2 (2.49)	15.2 (0.60)	4.1 (0.16)	626.9 (24.69)
Average precipitation days (≥ 0.1 mm)	6.8	8.3	13.0	16.9	19.6	21.0	17.0	15.0	16.8	16.4	7.3	3.9	162
Average snowy days	12.2	11.1	6.3	0.3	0	0	0	0	0	0	2.1	7.1	39.1
Average relative humidity (%)	62	61	62	63	67	73	72	69	73	73	69	64	67
Mean monthly sunshine hours	80.7	130.5	162.7	174.8	170.9	136.8	158.3	164.5	128.8	121.7	87.2	67.7	1,584.6
Percentage possible sunshine	25	41	44	45	40	32	37	40	35	35	28	22	35
Source: China Meteorological Administrationall-time extreme temperature

== Administrative divisions ==
Li County oversees 6 towns and 5 townships. (Note: The former source (stats.gov.cn) indicates 6 towns and 7 townships as of the start of 2019, whereas the latter source (sc.gov.cn) documents a decree passed in December 2019 revoking 1 of the 7 townships, bringing the number down to 6.)The county government is seated in the town of Zhaxiling.

Name	Simplified Chinese	Hanyu Pinyin	Tibetan	Wylie	Qiang	Administrative division code
Towns
Zhaxiling Town (Zagunao)	杂谷脑镇	Zágǔnǎo Zhèn	བཀྲ་ཤིས་གླིང་གྲོང་རྡལ།	bkra shis gling grong rdal	Bawxiaen	513222100
Nyaglo Town (Miyaluo)	米亚罗镇	Mǐyàluó Zhèn	མྱག་ལོ་ཀྲེན།	myag lo kren	Miyalo	513222101
Gubrago Town (Gu'ergou)	古尔沟镇	Gǔ'ěrgōu Zhèn	ཀུབ་ར་མགོ་གྲོང་རྡལ།	kub ra mgo grong rdal	Guergeu	513222102
Xuecheng Town (Xüchêng)	薛城镇	Xuēchéng Zhèn	ཞུའེ་ཁྲེང་ཀྲེན་།	zhuve khreng kren		513222103
Taoping Town	桃坪镇	Táopíng Zhèn	ཐའོ་ཕིང་གྲོང་རྡལ།	thavo phing grong rdal	Saqi	513222104
Putou Town (Püdü)	朴头镇	Pǔtóu Zhèn	ཕུའི་འཏུའི་གྲོང་རྡལ།	phuvi vtuvi grong rdal		513222105
Townships
Ganbao Township (Gainpu)	甘堡乡	Gānbǎo Xiāng	ཀམ་ཕུ་ཡུལ་ཚོ།	kam phu yul tsho		513222202
Puxi Township (Puqi)	蒲溪乡	Púxī Xiāng	ཕུའུ་ཆི་ཡུལ་ཚོ།	phuvu chi yul tsho		513222203
Bodogxugo Township (Shangmeng)	上孟乡	Shàngmèng Xiāng	འབོ་ཏོག་ཤུ་ཀོ་ཡུལ་ཚོ།	vbo tog shu ko yul tsho		513222204
Bodogxudo Township (Xiameng)	下孟乡	Xiàmèng Xiāng	འབོ་ཏོག་ཤུ་ཏོ་ཡུལ་ཚོ།	vbo tog shu to yul tsho		513222205
Tonghua Township	通化乡	Tōnghuà Xiāng	ཐོང་ཧྭ་ཞང་།	thong hwa zhang		513222207

== Demographics ==
As of 2018, Li County had a registered population of 43,375. 11,706 of the county's population, or 27%, is urbanized.

The county had a population of 42,494 in 1999.

=== Ethnic groups ===
Li County Ethnic Composition (2018)
Ethnicity	Population	Percentage
Tibetan	23,175	53.43%
Qiang	14,531	33.50%
Han	5,405	12.46%
Hui	179	0.41%
Other	85	0.20%

== Transport ==
- China National Highway 317
