= Wenchuan County =

Wenchuan County 汶川县 · ཝུན་ཁྲོན་རྫོང་། · Kvusa
- County
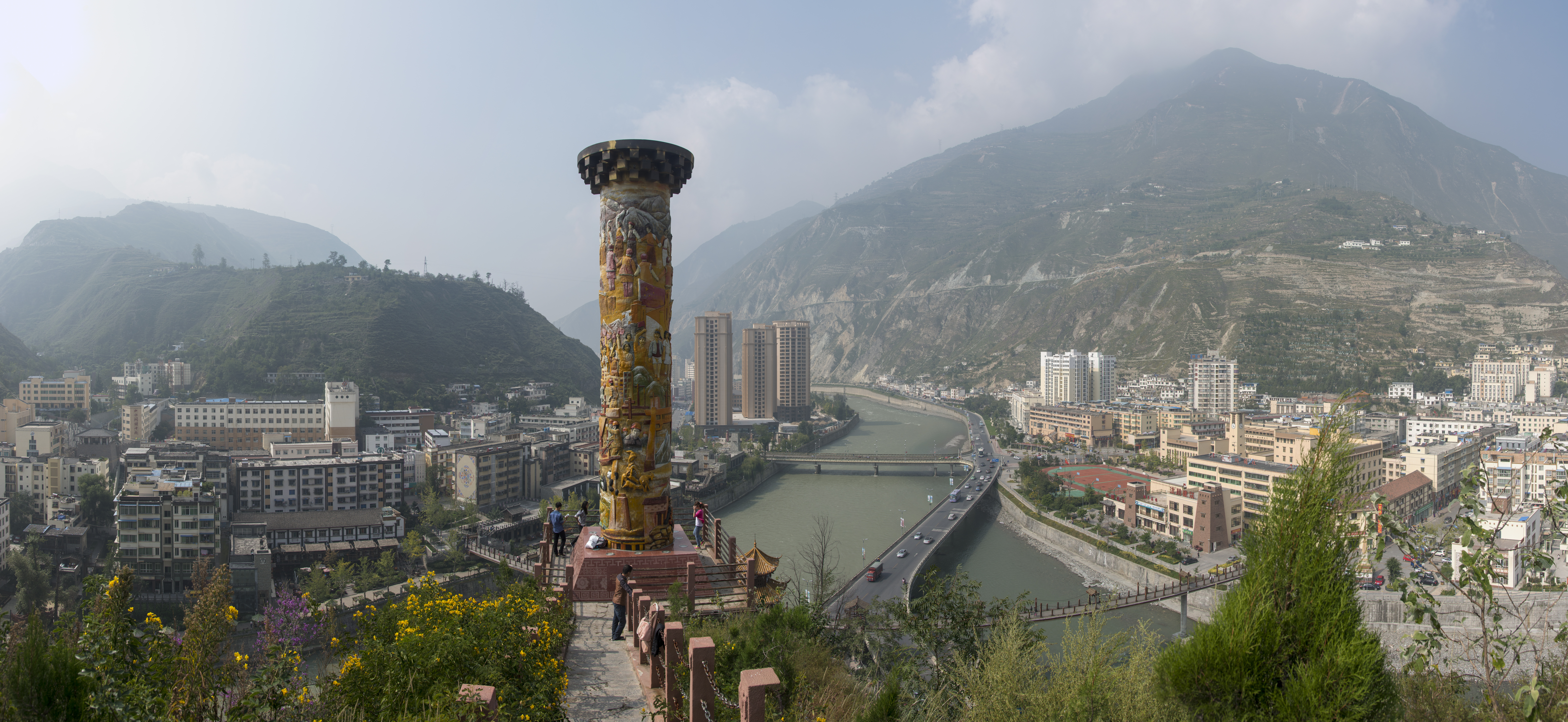
- Wenchuan panorama in 2013

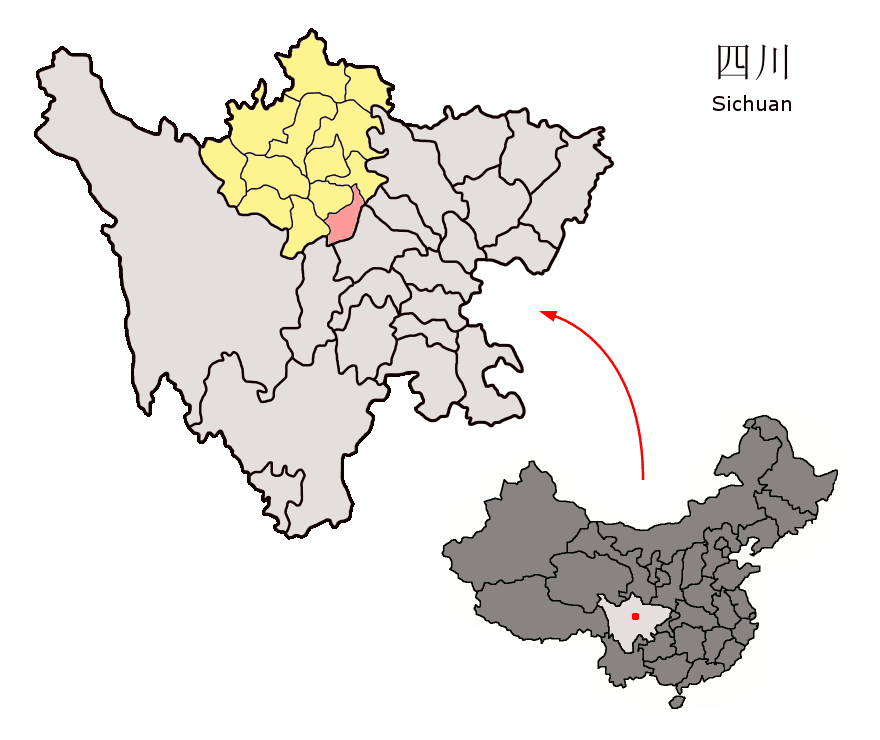
- Location of Wenchuan County (red) in Ngawa Prefecture (yellow) and Sichuan

- Location of the seat in Sichuan Wenchuan (China)
- Coordinates: 31°28′37″N 103°35′24″E
- Country: China
- Province: Sichuan
- Autonomous prefecture: Ngawa
- County seat: Weizhou

Area
  - Total: 4,804 km^{2} (1,855 sq mi)

Population (2020)
  - Total: 82,971
  - Density: 17.27/km^{2} (44.73/sq mi)
  - Major nationalities: Qiang - 39.5% Han - 38.7% Tibetan - 20.4% Hui - 1.1% Others - 0.3%
- Time zone: UTC+8 (China Standard)
- Postal code: 623000
- Area code: 0837
- Website: www.wenchuan.gov.cn

Wenchuan County

Chinese name
- Chinese: 汶川
Transcriptions
Standard Mandarin
- Hanyu Pinyin: Wènchuān

Tibetan name
- Tibetan: ཝུན་ཁྲོན།
Transcriptions
- Wylie: wun khron
- Tibetan Pinyin: Wünchoin

Qiang name
- Qiang: Kvusa

Wenchuan County is a county in Ngawa Tibetan and Qiang Autonomous Prefecture, Sichuan, China. The county has an area of 4,084 square kilometres (1,577 sq mi), and a population of 100,771 as of 2010. Wolong National Nature Reserve is a protected area located in Wenchuan County, which houses more than 150 highly endangered giant pandas. The Wolong Special Administrative Region is also located here.

The county's Yingxiu town was the site of the epicentre of the 2008 Sichuan earthquake, also known as the Wenchuan earthquake.

== Toponymy ==
The county is named after the Wenshui River (Chinese: 汶水), now known as the Min River.

== History ==
Wenchuan County was established in 1958, when the former Maowen Qiang Autonomous County (Chinese: 茂汶羌族自治县; pinyin: Màowèn Qiāng Zú Zìzhì Xiàn) was split into Mao County and Wenchuan County.

A number of Neolithic sites have been excavated in the Wenchuan area. The site of Jiangweicheng, located at the northern end of the county town of Weizhou in Wenchuan, has been archaeologically confirmed as a Neolithic site in the upper reaches of the Minjiang River, which extends over a long period divided into three phases. It is estimated to be a new cultural type resulting from the introduction of a late Yangshao culture from the upper and middle reaches of the Yellow River into the upper reaches of the Min River. There are similarities between the sarcophagus burial tomb and the Majiayao culture of Gansu and Qinghai. The site of Jiangwei City is in a different spectrum from the painted pottery and jars excavated from sites in the Chengdu Plain, but lace-mouthed yansha jars of the same spectrum have also been excavated.

On 25 August 1933, a massive 7.5 magnitude earthquake struck the town of Fuxi in Mao County, north of Wenchuan, where six people were killed by a rock collapse and more than 480 people were killed in Wenchuan in the subsequent floods after the earthquake.

=== Wenchuan earthquake ===
On May 12, 2008, an earthquake with moment magnitude 7.9 hit the Sichuan Province, with epicentre located in the town of Yingxiu, in Wenchuan county. The county was therefore one of the areas most severely affected by the earthquake. In Chinese, the earthquake is named after the county (the Wenchuan earthquake, 汶川地震), which made its name resonate across the nation. In the county, 15,941 people died, 34,583 were injured, and 7,474 were still missing as of June 6, 2008. The seismic intensity was the highest, reaching level XI in the China Seismic Intensity Scale. After the earthquake, the central government enforced stricter requirements for seismic design in this area. The earthquake also caused many landslides, some of which remained active for years and generated destructive debris flows during the summer rainstorms, which increased the death toll and slowed reconstruction and recovery of the communities in the county.

== Subdivisions ==
Wenchuan County administers nine towns:

Name	Simplified Chinese	Hanyu Pinyin	Tibetan	Wylie	Qiang	Administrative division code
Towns
Weizhou Town	威州镇	Wēizhōu Zhèn	ཝེ་ཀྲོའུ་གྲོང་རྡལ།	we krovu grong rdal		513221100
Yingxiu Town	映秀镇	Yìngxiù Zhèn	དབྱིངས་ཤིའུ་གྲོང་རྡལ།	dbyings shivu grong rdal		513221102
Wolong Town	卧龙镇	Wòlóng Zhèn	ཨོ་ལུང་གྲོང་རྡལ།	o lung grong rdal	Vvolong	513221103
Shuimo Town	水磨镇	Shuǐmó Zhèn	ཧྲུའི་མའོ་གྲོང་རྡལ།	hruvi mavo grong rdal		513221105
Xuankou Town	漩口镇	Xuánkǒu Zhèn	ཞོན་ཁོའུ་གྲོང་རྡལ།	zhon khovu grong rdal		513221106
Sanjiang Town	三江镇	Sānjiāng Zhèn	སན་ཅང་གྲོང་རྡལ།	san cang grong rdal		513221107
Gengda Town	耿达镇	Gěngdá Zhèn	ཀུན་ཏ་གྲོང་རྡལ།	kun ta grong rdal		513221108
Miansi Town	绵虒镇	Miánsī Zhèn	མེན་ཁྲི་གྲོང་རྡལ།	men khri grong rdal		513221109
Bazhou Town	灞州镇	Bàzhōu Zhèn	བཱ་ཀྲོའུ་གྲོང་རྡལ	bā krovu grong rdal		513221111

== Demographics ==
Population census
Year	Pop.	±% p.a.
1990	96,054	—
1996	104,000	+1.33%
2000	111,935	+1.86%
2005	106,238	−1.04%
2010	100,771	−1.05%

According to a 2021 publication by the county government, Wenchuan County's ethnic composition is 39.5% Qiang, 38.7% Han, 20.4% Tibetan, 1.1% Hui, and 0.3% belonging to other ethnic minorities.

The 2010 Chinese Census reported the county's population as 100,771 people.

In 2005, the county reported a population of 106,238, with 34.16% of the population being ethnically Qiang.

The 2000 Chinese Census reported the county's population as 111,935.

In 1996, the county's population was estimated to be about 104,000, up from the 96,054 reported in 1990.

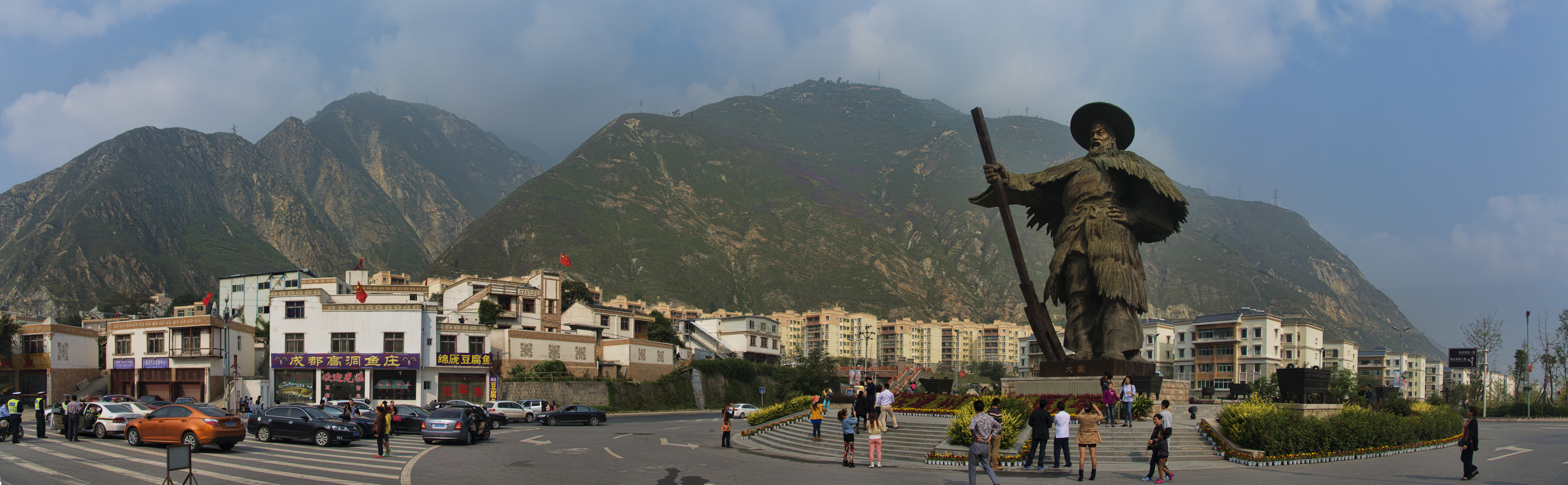
The monumentale sculpture on the place is Yu the Great (大禹), Qiang people hero and founder of the Xia dynasty.

== Economy ==
As of 2019, Wenchuan County's gross domestic product totaled ¥7.264 billion, a 6.2% increase from the previous year. Consumer retail sales totaled ¥1.082 billion. The annual per capita disposable income of the county reached ¥34,513 for its urban residents, and ¥15,049 for its rural residents, an increase of 8.2% and 12.0%, respectively.

According to the county government, there were 4,440 people in the county living in poverty in 2014. The county government claims that all its citizens were lifted out of poverty in 2019.

=== Tourism ===
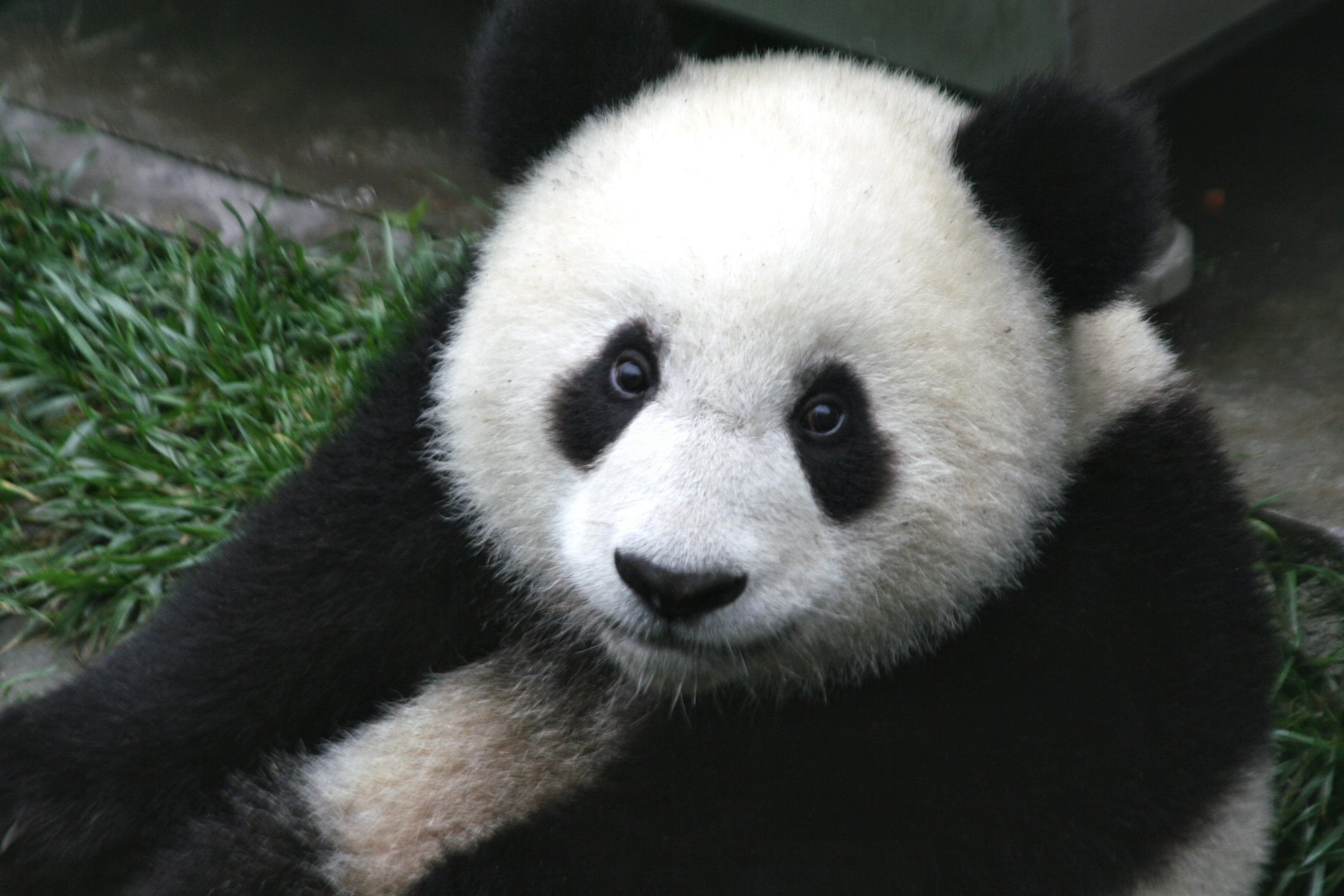
A Giant panda cub in Wolong National Nature Reserve

Wenchuan County is home to the Wolong National Nature Reserve, as well as the Sichuan Caopo Nature Reserve (Chinese: 四川草坡自然保护区). Other tourist attractions in the county include the AAAAA-rated Wenchuan Special Tourist Area (Chinese: 汶川特别旅游区) and the AAAA-rated Yu the Great Cultural Tourist Area (Chinese: 大禹文化旅游区).

In 2019, the county received 6,277,800 visitors, bringing the county ¥2.87 billion in revenue.

== Transport ==
Road traffic in Wenchuan County is dominated by National Highway 213 and National Highway 317. In 2012, the 82 km long G4217 Duwen Expressway, which connects the city with Dujiangyan and other cities in the Sichuan basin, was fully opened to traffic, and the Wenchuan-Markang motorway (Wenma Expressway), also part of G4217, was fully opened to traffic on 31 December 2021. Wenchuan County Bus Station is located in Weizhou Town, Wenchuan, with daily buses to Chengdu, Dujiangyan, Pengzhou, Li County, Markang, Jiuzhaigou and other places. All scenic spots can be reached by bus, except for Qipanggou Forest Park and Xiqiang Grand Canyon, which are not yet open to traffic. In 2013, bus lines covering 11 towns and townships in the county, including Yingxiu, Xuankou, Shuimo and Sanjiang, were put into operation. By the end of 2014, the total mileage of roads in Wenchuan County was 696 kilometers, 619 kilometers of high-grade highways and 51 kilometers of expressways.

== Cuisine ==
Sweet cherry: This variety has kidney-shaped, large fruit with a distinct suture line, and a glossy, deep red to purplish-red skin.

Sanjiang cured pork: It is made by marinating pork in a vat with salt and other ingredients.

Potato Cakes: A local snack made primarily from potatoes, these cakes have a similar elasticity and stickiness to glutinous rice cakes, giving them a unique texture.

== Climate ==
Climate data for Wenchuan, elevation 1,370 m (4,490 ft), (1991–2020 normals, extremes 1981–2010)
Month	Jan	Feb	Mar	Apr	May	Jun	Jul	Aug	Sep	Oct	Nov	Dec	Year
Record high °C (°F)	16.9 (62.4)	23.6 (74.5)	32.7 (90.9)	32.7 (90.9)	33.9 (93.0)	35.1 (95.2)	37.1 (98.8)	35.5 (95.9)	34.4 (93.9)	27.9 (82.2)	24.2 (75.6)	22.0 (71.6)	37.1 (98.8)
Mean daily maximum °C (°F)	8.9 (48.0)	11.8 (53.2)	16.4 (61.5)	21.7 (71.1)	24.6 (76.3)	26.8 (80.2)	29.2 (84.6)	29.1 (84.4)	24.6 (76.3)	19.7 (67.5)	15.5 (59.9)	10.4 (50.7)	19.9 (67.8)
Daily mean °C (°F)	4.0 (39.2)	6.4 (43.5)	10.5 (50.9)	15.3 (59.5)	18.6 (65.5)	21.1 (70.0)	23.4 (74.1)	23.3 (73.9)	19.6 (67.3)	15.0 (59.0)	10.5 (50.9)	5.4 (41.7)	14.4 (58.0)
Mean daily minimum °C (°F)	0.6 (33.1)	2.9 (37.2)	6.7 (44.1)	11.1 (52.0)	14.4 (57.9)	17.1 (62.8)	19.3 (66.7)	19.3 (66.7)	16.4 (61.5)	12.0 (53.6)	7.1 (44.8)	2.0 (35.6)	10.7 (51.3)
Record low °C (°F)	−7.0 (19.4)	−6.4 (20.5)	−4.4 (24.1)	2.5 (36.5)	6.6 (43.9)	10.5 (50.9)	13.4 (56.1)	12.6 (54.7)	9.3 (48.7)	3.2 (37.8)	−1.4 (29.5)	−7.4 (18.7)	−7.4 (18.7)
Average precipitation mm (inches)	2.6 (0.10)	6.1 (0.24)	20.9 (0.82)	52.5 (2.07)	70.5 (2.78)	83.1 (3.27)	72.6 (2.86)	78.9 (3.11)	60.4 (2.38)	43.1 (1.70)	10.0 (0.39)	1.6 (0.06)	502.3 (19.78)
Average precipitation days (≥ 0.1 mm)	4.6	6.2	11.3	16.2	18.2	18.6	16.6	14.9	15.5	15.4	6.6	2.2	146.3
Average snowy days	7.6	4.2	0.7	0.1	0	0	0	0	0	0	0.2	2.2	15
Average relative humidity (%)	62	62	62	63	64	68	69	68	71	72	67	63	66
Mean monthly sunshine hours	121.1	112.3	130.7	148.8	138.4	109.8	135.5	140.4	98.4	93.5	112.3	118.7	1,459.9
Percentage possible sunshine	38	36	35	38	32	26	32	35	27	27	36	38	33
Source: China Meteorological Administration
