= Ngawa Tibetan and Qiang Autonomous Prefecture =

Aba Prefecture 阿坝州 · རྔ་བ་ཁུལ། · Rrmeabba Legea
- Autonomous prefecture
- 阿坝藏族羌族自治州 · རྔ་བ་བོད་རིགས་ཆ་བ༹ང་རིགས་རང་སྐྱོང་ཁུལ། · Rrmeabba Shbea Rrmea Nyujwju Gvexueaj LegeaNgawa Tibetan and Qiang Autonomous Prefecture
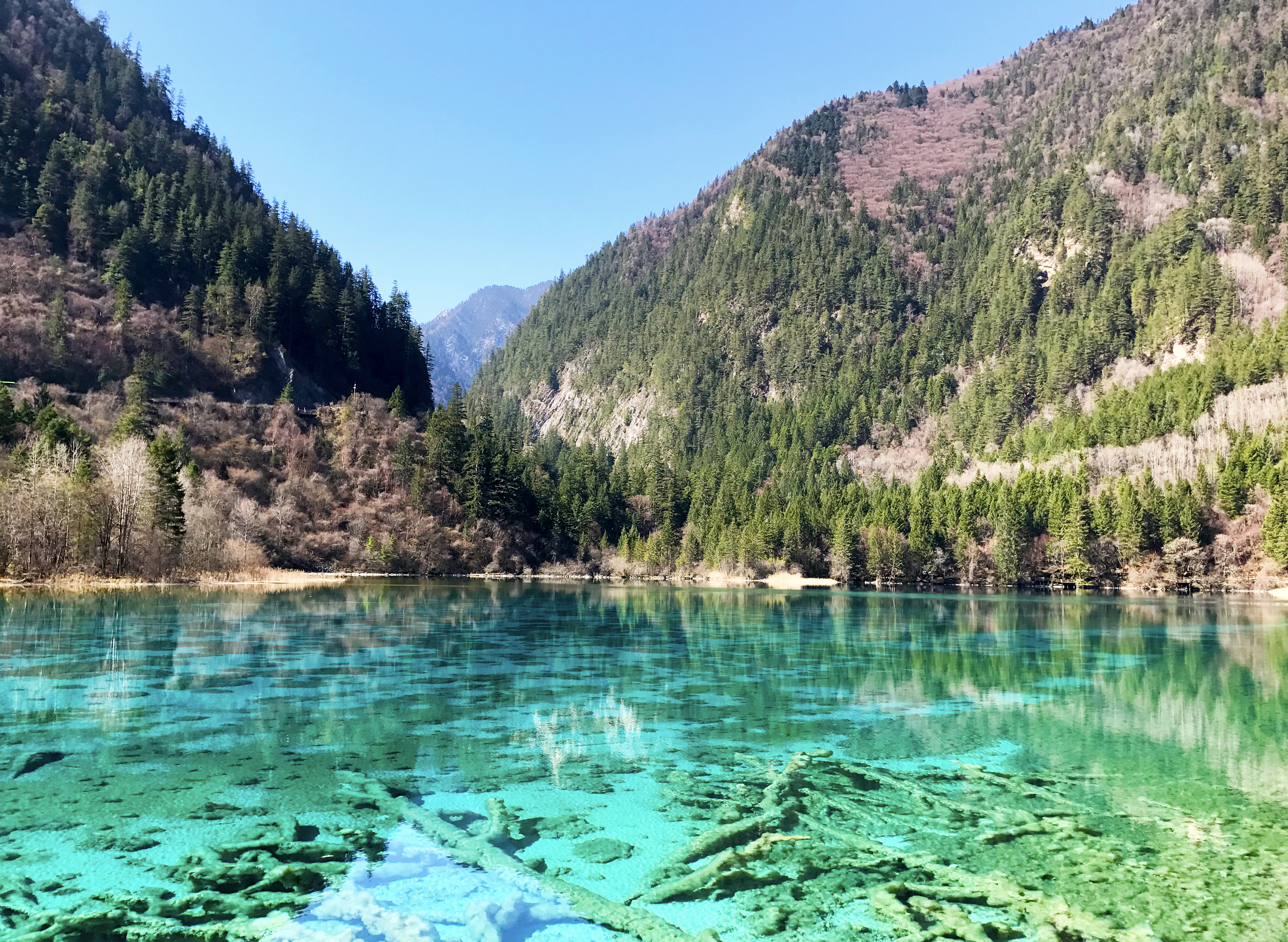
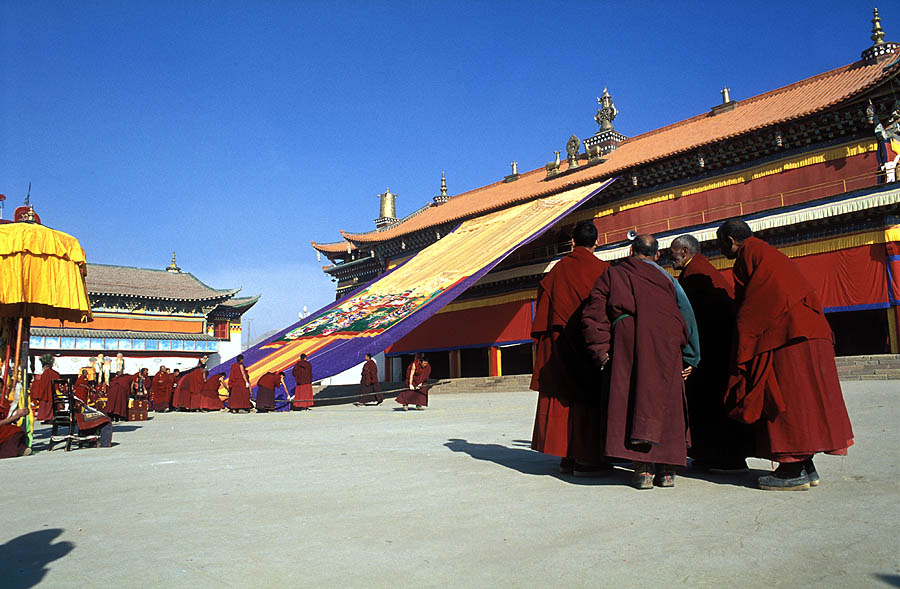
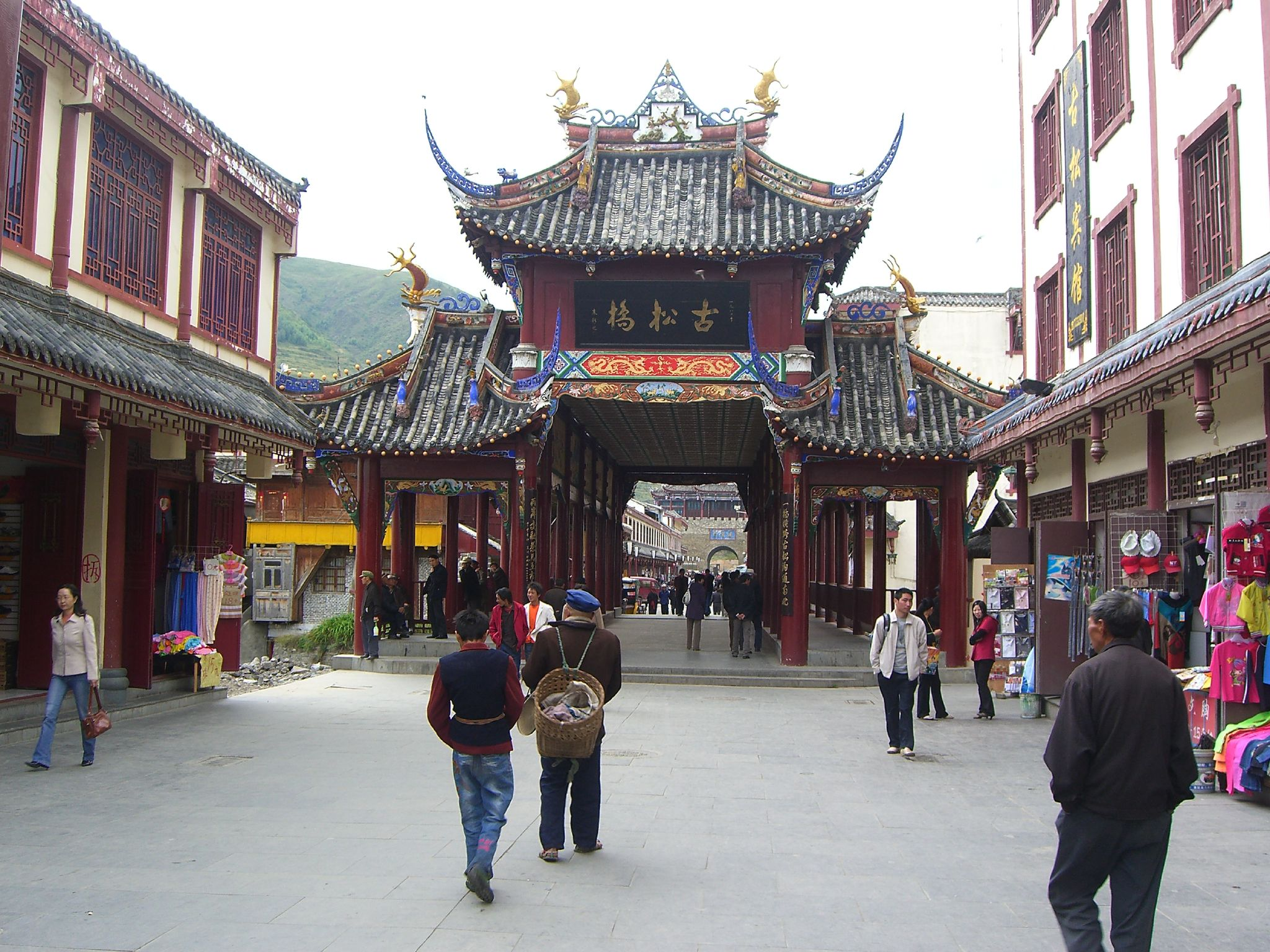
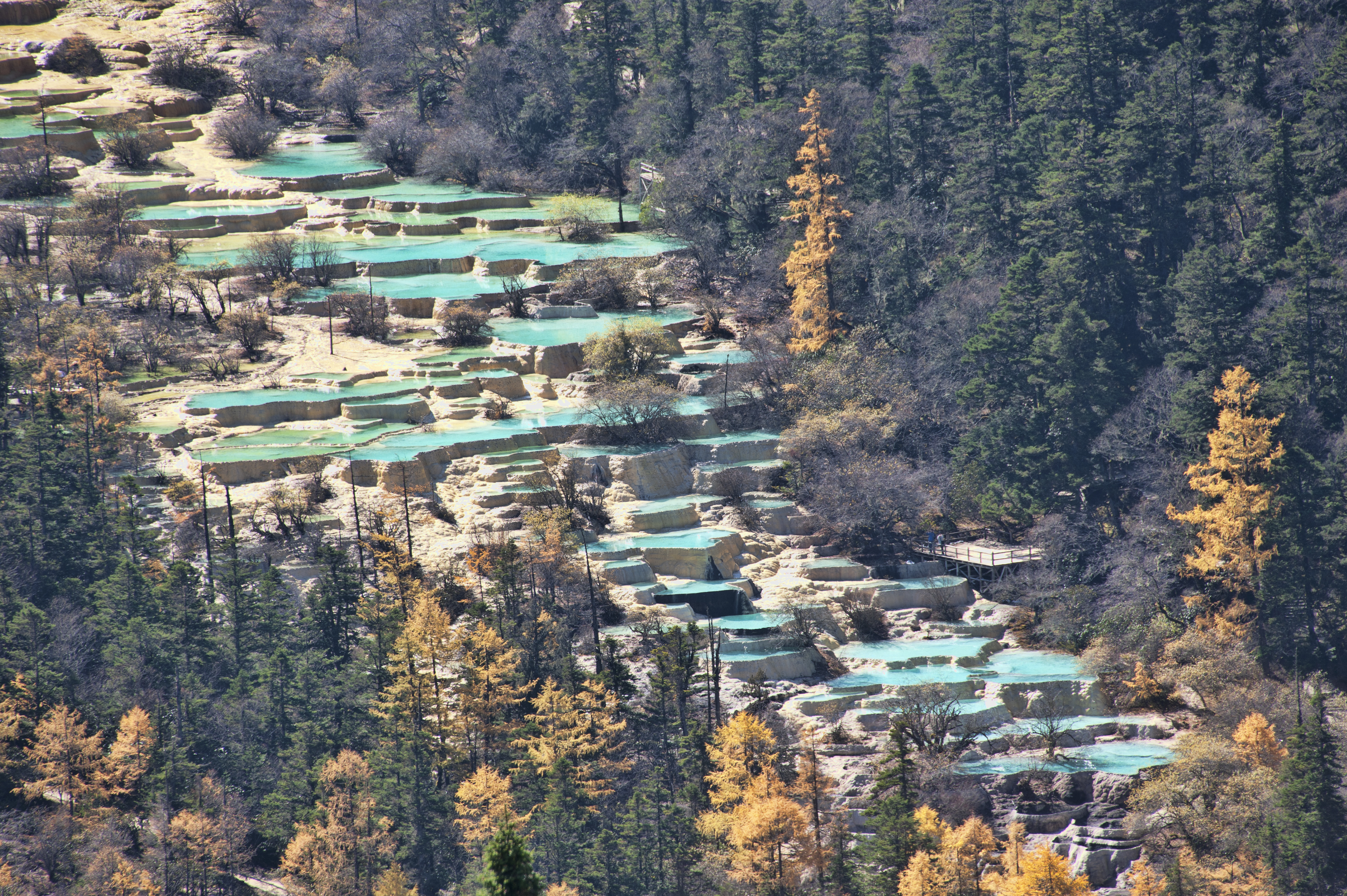
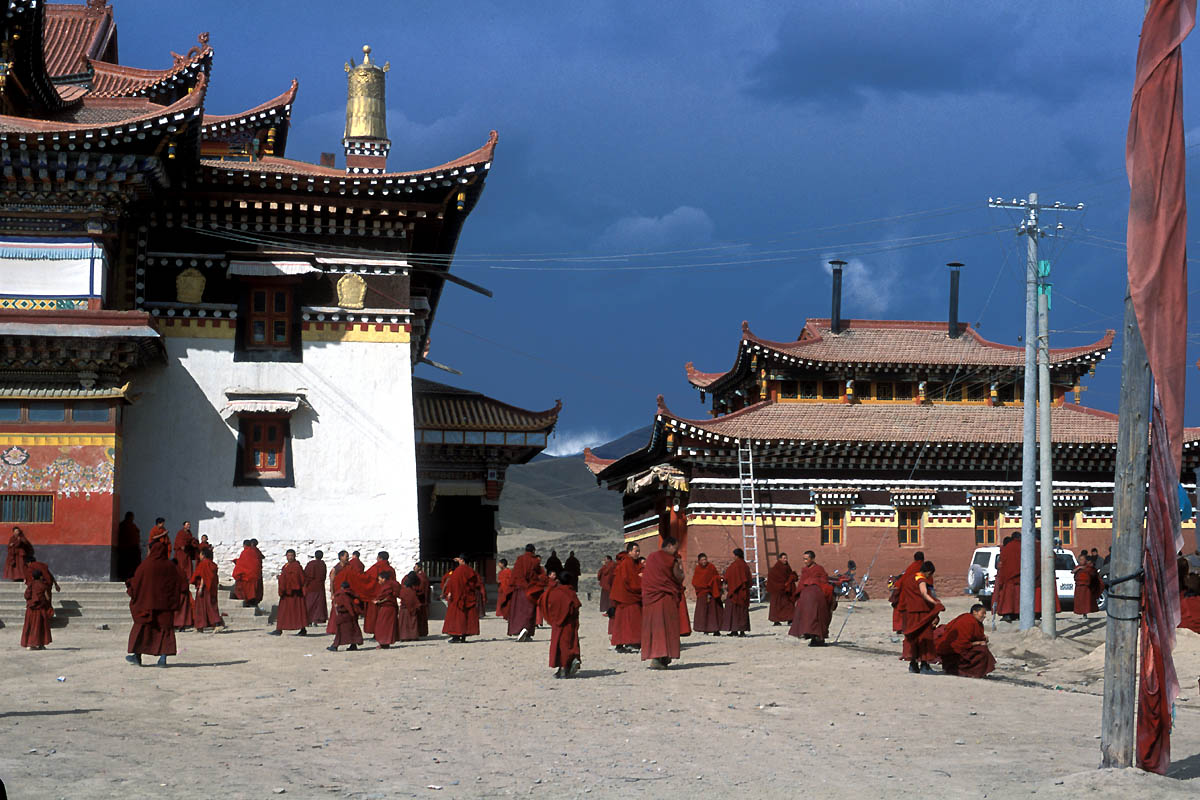
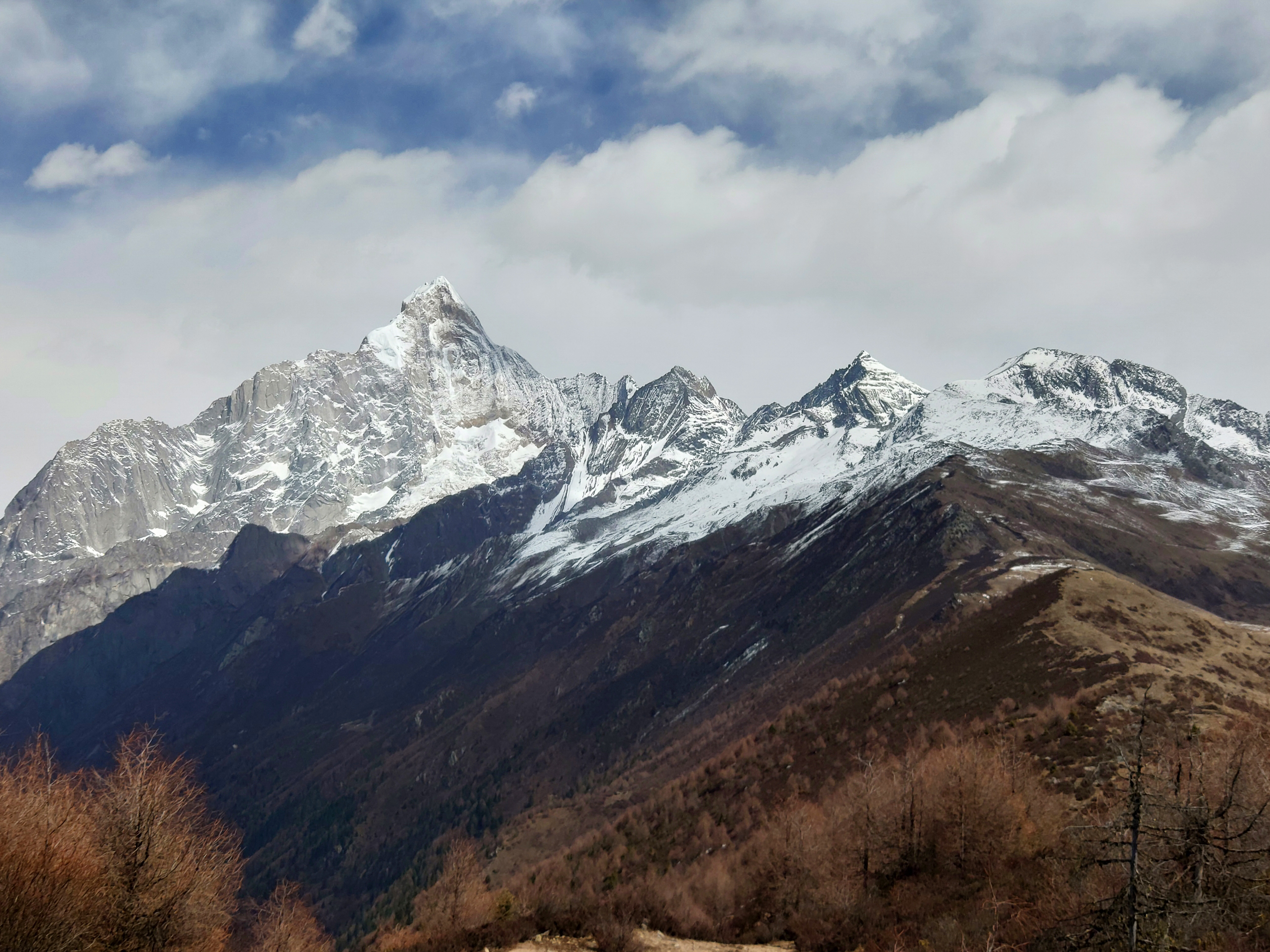
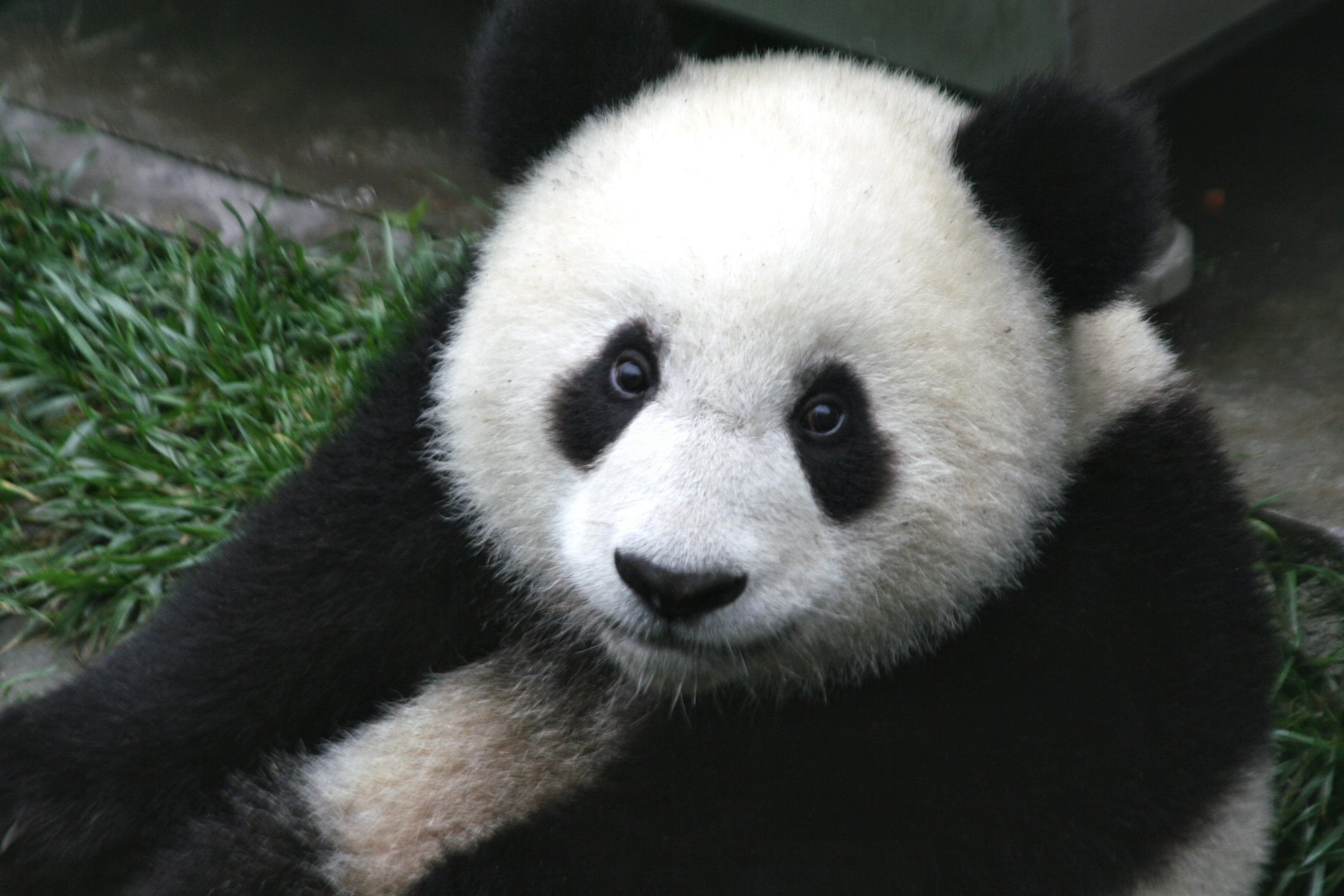
- Jiuzhaigou National Park Kirti Gompa Songpan Bridge in Songpan Ancient City Huanglong Nangzhik Gompa Mount Siguniang Giant Panda at the Wolong National Nature Reserve

- Ngawa-Qiang Autonomous Prefecture (top centre) in Sichuan
- Coordinates (Ngawa Prefecture government): 31.90°N 102.22°E
- Country: China
- Province: Sichuan
- Prefecture seat: Barkam (Barkam Town)

Government
  - Type: Autonomous prefecture
  - CCP Secretary: Xu Zhivin
  - Congress Chairman: Luo Zhenhua
  - Governor: Yang Kening
  - CPPCC Chairman: Nyima Mu

Area
  - Total: 83,201 km^{2} (32,124 sq mi)

Population (2022)
  - Total: 895,200
  - Density: 10.76/km^{2} (27.87/sq mi)
  - Major Ethnic Groups: Tibetan−60.2% Han−18.0% Qiang- 18.5% Hui−3.1%

GDP
  - Total: CN¥ 26.5 billion US$ 4.3 billion
  - Per capita: CN¥ 28,647; US$ 4,599
- Time zone: UTC+08:00 (China Standard)
- Area code: 0837
- ISO 3166 code: CN-SC-32
- License Plate Prefix: 川U
- Website: Aba China

Ngawa Tibetan and Qiang Autonomous Prefecture

Chinese name
- Simplified Chinese: 阿坝藏族羌族自治州
- Traditional Chinese: 阿壩藏族羌族自治州
Transcriptions
Standard Mandarin
- Hanyu Pinyin: Ābà Zàngzú Qiāngzú Zìzhìzhōu

Abbreviated as "Aba Prefecture"
- Simplified Chinese: 阿坝州
- Traditional Chinese: 阿壩州
Transcriptions
Standard Mandarin
- Hanyu Pinyin: Ābà Zhōu

Tibetan name
- Tibetan: རྔ་བ་བོད་རིགས་དང་ཆང་རིགས་རང་སྐྱོང་ཁུལ།
Transcriptions
- Wylie: nga ba bod rigs dang chang rigs rang skyong khul
- Tibetan Pinyin: Ngawa Poirig Qangrig Ranggyong Kü

Ngawa Tibetan and Qiang Autonomous Prefecture, also known as Aba (Tibetan: རྔ་བ་བོད་རིགས་དང་ཆང་རིགས་རང་སྐྱོང་ཁུལ།, Wylie: rnga ba bod rigs cha'ang rigs rang skyong khul; Qiang: Rrmeabba Shbea Rrmea Nyujwju Gvexueaj Legea; simplified Chinese: 阿坝藏族羌族自治州; traditional Chinese: 阿壩藏族羌族自治州), is an autonomous prefecture of northwestern Sichuan, bordering Gansu to the north and northeast and Qinghai to the northwest. Its seat is in Barkam, and it has an area of 83,201 km^{2} (32,124 sq mi). The population was 895,200 by 2022.

The county of Wenchuan in Ngawa is the site of the epicenter of the 2008 Sichuan earthquake, in which over 20,000 of its residents died and 40,000 were injured.

== History and names ==
During the reign of Tibet's king Trisong Detsen in the 8th century, the Gyalrong area was visited by the great translator Vairotsana.

In 1410 Je Tsongkhapa's student Tshakho Ngawang Tapa established the first Tibetan Buddhist Gelug school monastery in the area, called "Gyalrong".

In contemporary history, most of Ngawa was under the 16th Administrative Prefecture of Szechwan (四川省第十六行政督察區), which was established by the Republic of China (ROC).

The People's Republic of China defeated ROC troops in this area during Chinese Civil war and subsequently established a Tibetan autonomous prefecture by late 1952. It was renamed Aba Tibetan Autonomous Prefecture in 1956 and Aba Tibetan and Qiang Autonomous Prefecture in 1987.

On May 12, 2008, a major earthquake occurred in Wenchuan County (Tibetan: ལུང་དགུ་, Wylie: lung dgu), a county in the southeastern part of this autonomous prefecture. 20,258 people were killed, 45,079 injured, 7,696 missing in the prefecture as of June 6, 2008.

== Geography ==
Most of the prefecture lies in the Tibetan cultural and historical region of Amdo. The west, and part of Kardze, is also known as Gyalrong. Gyalrong people speak a Qiangic language known as Gyalrong language. The source of the Min River and its tributary Dadu River are to be found in Ngawa.

== Demographics ==
As of 2013, the prefecture's population was 919,987 inhabitants at a density of 10.91 per km^{2}. At the end of 2024, the resident population of the whole state was 828,000, including 372,000 in urban areas and 456,000 in rural areas.

Ethnic group	Population	Proportion of total
Tibetan	489,747	57.3%
Han	220,353	20.6%
Qiang	157,905	18.6%
Hui	26,353	3.3%
Yi	685	0.08%
Manchu	373	0.04%
Miao	266	0.03%
Mongols	202	0.02%
Tujia	182	0.02%
Bai	101	0.01%
Zhuang	95	0.01%
others	278	0.03%

=== Languages ===
Major languages spoken in Aba Prefecture include Tibetan, Mandarin Chinese and many vernaculars of the Qiangic languages which vary from county to county:

- Barkam: rGyalrong
- Li County: Southern Qiang, rGyalrong
- Mao County: Northern Qiang, Southern Qiang
- Jiuzhaigou County: Baima
- Jinchuan County: Khroskyabs, rGyalrong
- Xiaojin County: rGyalrong
- Heishui County: Northern Qiang, rGyalrong
- Zamtang County: Amdo Tibetan

== Administrative divisions ==
The region is composed of one county-level city and twelve counties:

Map
#	Name	Hanzi	Pinyin	Tibetan	Wylie	Qiang	Population (2010 Census)	Area (km^{2})	Density (/km^{2})
1	Barkam City (Ma'erkang City)	马尔康市	Mǎ'ěrkāng Shì	འབར་ཁམས་གྲོང་ཁྱེར།	'bar khams rdzong	Muerkvua shi	58,437	6,639	8.80
2	Wenchuan County	汶川县	Wènchuān Xiàn	ལུང་དགུ་རྫོང་། / ཁྲི་ཚང་རྫོང་།	lung dgu rdzong / khri tshang rdzong		100,771	4,083	24.68
3	Li County	理县	Lǐ Xiàn	བཀྲ་ཤིས་གླིང་།	bkra shis gling	pauɕuq	46,556	4,318	10.78
4	Mao County	茂县	Mào Xiàn	མའོ་ཝུན།	ma'o wun	ʂqini	104,829	4,075	25.72
5	Songpan County	松潘县	Sōngpān Xiàn	ཟུང་ཆུ་རྫོང་།	zung chu rdzong		72,309	8,486	8.52
6	Jiuzhaigou County	九寨沟县	Jiǔzhàigōu Xiàn	གཟི་རྩ་སྡེ་དགུ་རྫོང་།	gzi rtsa sde dgu rdzong		81,394	5,286	15.39
7	Jinchuan County	金川县	Jīnchuān Xiàn	ཆུ་ཆེན་རྫོང་།	chu chen rdzong		65,976	5,524	11.94
8	Xiaojin County	小金县	Xiǎojīn Xiàn	བཙན་ལྷ་རྫོང་།	btsan lha rdzong		77,731	5,571	13.95
9	Heishui County	黑水县	Hēishuǐ Xiàn	ཁྲོ་ཆུ་རྫོང་།	khro chu rdzong	khǝtʂǝp	60,704	4,154	14.61
10	Zamtang County (Rangtang County)	壤塘县	Rǎngtáng Xiàn	འཛམ་ཐང་རྫོང་།	'dzam thang rdzong		39,173	6,836	5.73
11	Ngawa County (Aba County)	阿坝县	Ābà Xiàn	རྔ་བ་རྫོང་།	rnga ba rdzong	Ggabba	72,391	10,435	6.93
12	Zoigê County (Ruo'ergai County)	若尔盖县	Ruò'ěrgài Xiàn	མཛོད་དགེ་རྫོང་།	mdzod dge rdzong		74,619	10,437	7.14
13	Hongyuan County	红原县	Hóngyuán Xiàn	རྐ་ཁོག་རྫོང་། / ཁྱུང་མཆུ་རྫོང་།	rka khog rdzong / khyung mchu rdzong		43,818	8,398	5.21

Though situated within Wenchuan County, Wolong National Nature Reserve and Wolong Special Administrative Region are administered separately by the Forestry Department of Sichuan.

== Transportation ==
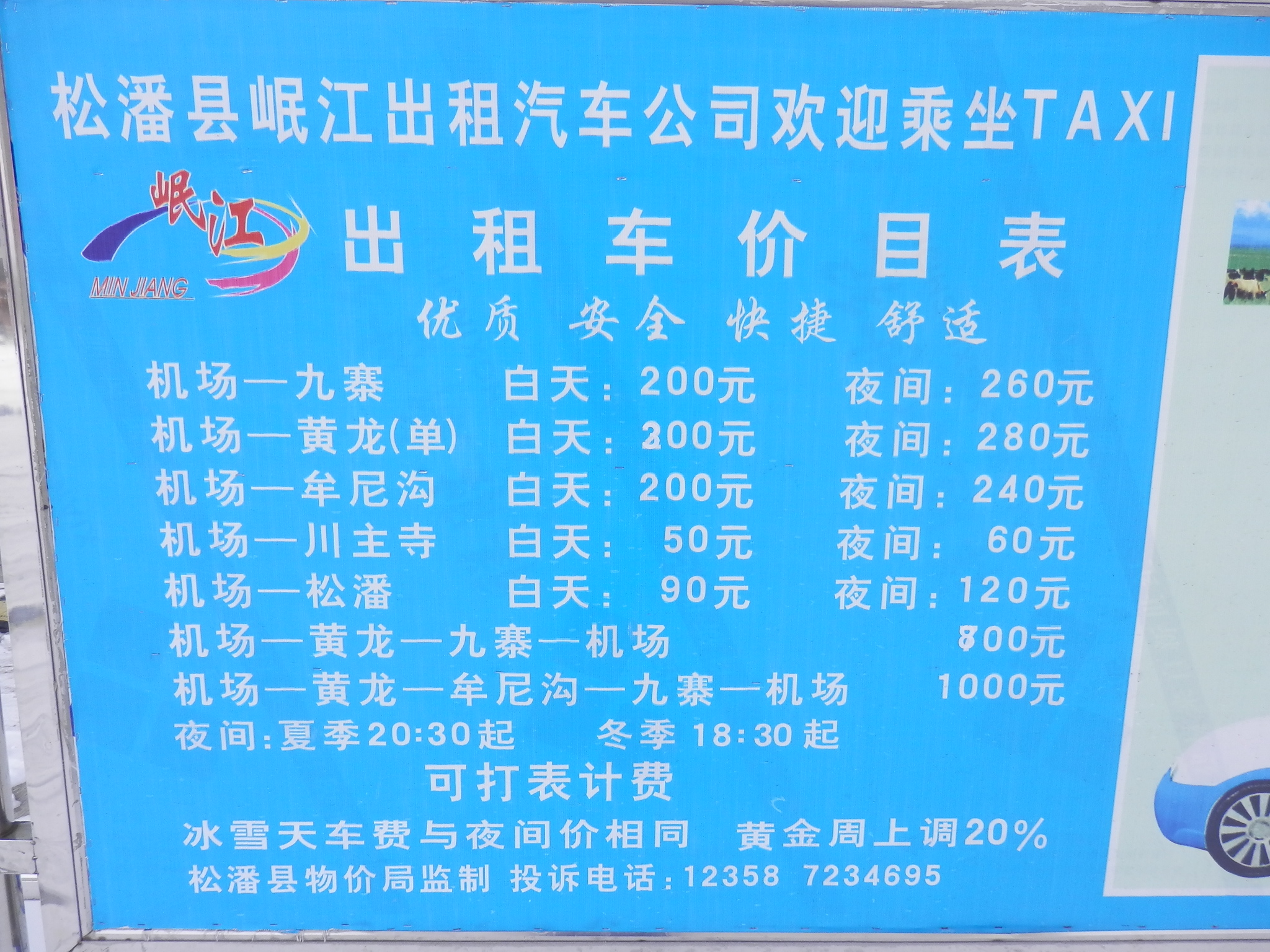
Taxi fare for Jiuzhai Huanglong Airport in Ngawa prefecture

The prefecture is served by Hongyuan Airport in the west and Jiuzhai Huanglong Airport in the east. Private taxis can be hired from these airports. Jiuzhaigou Train Station is under construction 55 km (34 mi) north-west of Jiuzhaigou County's town. The railway is to run between Chengdu and Lanzhou.

== Tourism ==
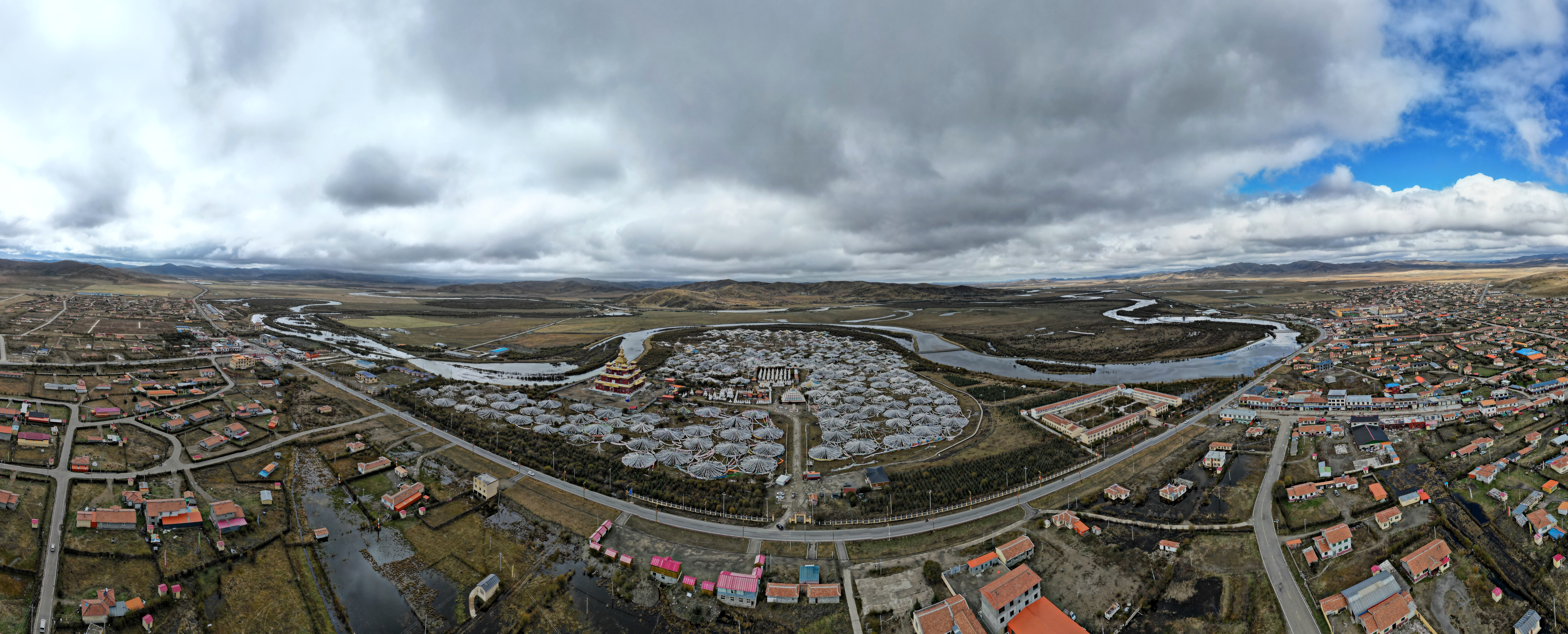
Aerial panorama of Waqie Talin 瓦切塔林 in Hongyuan county.

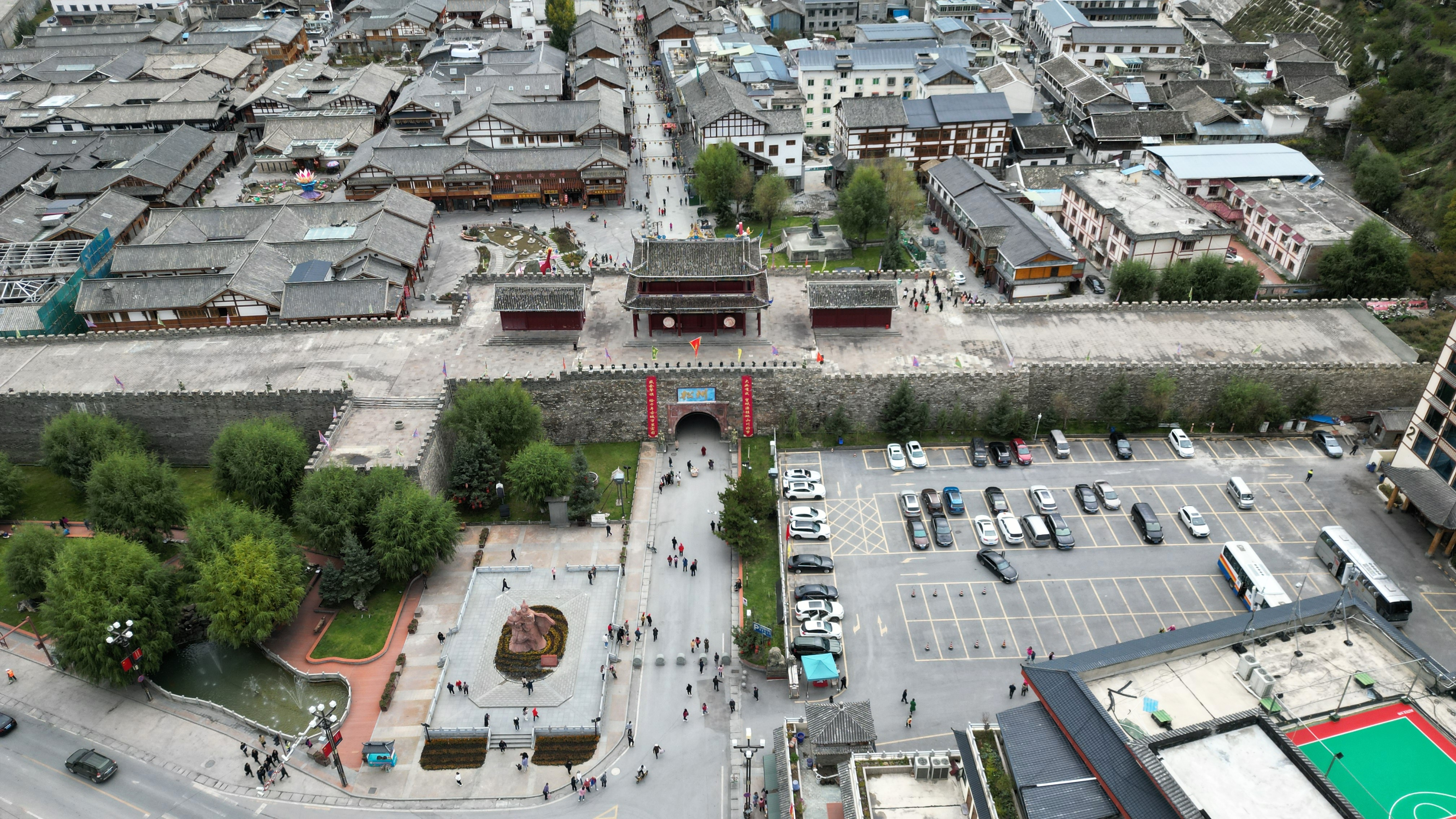
Aerial perspective of the Songpan Ancient City walls and fort. October 2023.

Tourism produced 71.0% of the GDP of the prefecture in 2006. There are many places of interest in the prefecture, including

- Wolong National Nature Reserve in Wenchuan County, a well-known giant panda reserve where the China Conservation and Research Center for the Giant Panda was established in 1980
- Kirti Gompa, a 15th-century Tibetan Buddhism monastery
- Nangzhik Gompa monastery, founded in the 12th century
- Huanglong Scenic and Historic Interest Area in Songpan County
- Jiuzhaigou, Jiuzhaigou County, a nature reserve known for its many multi-level waterfalls and colorful lakes, declared a UNESCO World Heritage Site in 1992
- Mount Siguniang (Chinese: 四姑娘山 Tibetan: སྐུ་བླ, Wylie: sku bla "Sku Mountain"; formerly Chinese: 四姑山, a transcription), the highest point of the Qionglai Mountains, on the border between Xiaojin County (Chinese: 小金县; Tibetan: Tibetan: བཙན་ལྷ) and Wenchuan County.
