= 1933 earthquake =

1933 earthquake may refer to:

- 1933 Baffin Bay earthquake (Canada, tsunami)
- 1933 Diexi earthquake (China)
- 1933 Long Beach earthquake (Los Angeles, California, US) (small tsunami)
- 1933 Sanriku earthquake (Japan) (great, tsunami)
- 1933 Kos earthquake (Greece)
- 1933 Sumatra earthquake (Indonesia)

== See also ==
- List of earthquakes in 1933
