= Northern Qiang language =

Qiangic language spoken in Tibet and China

Northern Qiang
- Rrmearr
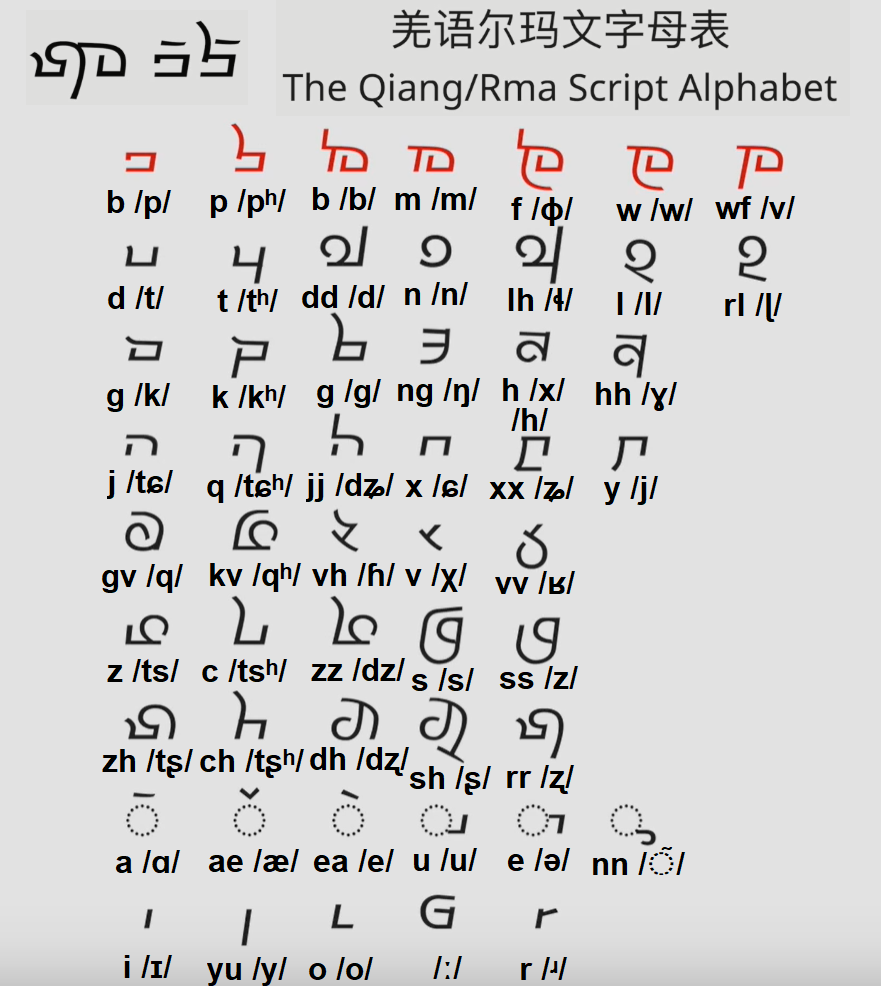
- Rma Script used in Qiang Language
- Pronunciation: [ʐmeʐ]
- Native to: China
- Region: Sichuan Province
- Ethnicity: Qiang people
- Native speakers: (58,000 cited 1999)
- Language family: Sino-Tibetan: Tibeto-Burman; Qiangic; Qiang; Northern Qiang
- Writing system: Latin, Rma

Language codes
- ISO 639-3: cng
- Glottolog: nort2722 Northern Qiang sout3257 Southeast Maoxian Qiang
- ELP: Northern Qiang

Northern Qiang is a Sino-Tibetan language of the Qiangic branch, more specifically falling under the Tibeto-Burman family. It is spoken by approximately 60,000 people in East Tibet, and in north-central Sichuan Province, China.

Unlike its close relative Southern Qiang, Northern Qiang is not a tonal language.

== Dialects ==
Northern Qiang is composed of several different dialects, many of which are easily mutually intelligible. Sun Hongkai in his book on Qiang in 1981 divides Northern Qiang into the following dialects: Luhua, Mawo, Zhimulin, Weigu, and Yadu. These dialects are located in Heishui County as well as the northern part of Mao County. The Luhua, Mawo, Zhimulin, and Weigu varieties of Northern Qiang are spoken by the Heishui Tibetans. The Mawo dialect is considered to be the prestige dialect by the Heishui Tibetans.

Names seen in the older literature for Northern Qiang dialects include Dzorgai (Sifan), Kortsè (Sifan), Krehchuh, and Thóchú/Thotcu/Thotśu. The last is a place name.

Sims (2016) characterizes Northern (Upstream) Qiang as the *nu- innovation group. Individual dialects are highlighted in italics.

Northern Qiang

- NW Heishui: Luhua 芦花镇
- Central Heishui
  - Qinglang 晴朗乡
  - Zhawo 扎窝乡
  - Ciba 慈坝乡
  - Shuangliusuo 双溜索乡
  - uvular V's innovation group: Zhimulin 知木林乡, Hongyan 红岩乡, Mawo 麻窝乡
- SE Heishui: Luoduo 洛多乡, Longba 龙坝乡, Musu 木苏乡, Shidiaolou 石碉楼乡
- North Maoxian: Taiping 太平乡, Songpinggou 松坪沟乡
- South Songpan: Xiaoxing 小姓乡, Zhenjiangguan 镇江关乡, Zhenping 镇坪乡
- West Maoxian / South Heishui: Weigu 维古乡, Waboliangzi 瓦钵乡梁子, Se'ergu 色尔古镇, Ekou, Weicheng 维城乡, Ronghong, Chibusu, Qugu 曲谷乡, Wadi 洼底乡, Baixi 白溪乡, Huilong 回龙乡, Sanlong 三龙乡
- Central Maoxian: Heihu 黑虎乡
- SE Maoxian (reflexive marker innovation): Goukou 沟口乡, Yonghe 永和乡

== Phonology ==
The phonemic inventory of the Northern Qiang of Ronghong village consists of 37 consonants, and eight basic vowel qualities. The syllable structure of Northern Qiang allows up to six sounds.

=== Consonants ===
		Labial	Dental		Retroflex	Palatal	Velar	Uvular	Glottal
		Labial	plain	sibilant	Retroflex	Palatal	Velar	Uvular	Glottal
Nasal		m	n			ɲ	ŋ		
Stop/ Affricate	voiceless	p	t	ts	ʈʂ	tɕ	k	q	
Stop/ Affricate	aspirated	pʰ	tʰ	tsʰ	ʈʂʰ	tɕʰ	kʰ	qʰ	
Stop/ Affricate	voiced	b	d	dz	ɖʐ	dʑ	ɡ		
Fricative	voiceless	ɸ	ɬ	s	ʂ	ɕ	x	χ	h
Fricative	voiced			z	ʐ			ʁ	ɦ
Approximant			l			(j)	(w)		

- A glottal stop [ʔ] may be heard in word-initial position when preceding vowels.
- /ɸ/ can also be heard as a labio-dental [f].
- /ʐ/ can also be heard as an alveolar [ɹ].
- /ɕ x/ can have voiced allophones of [ʑ ɣ].
- Approximants [w j] are not distinct from /i u/ but are transcribed in intervocalic position, and initially /i u/, to clarify syllable division.

=== Vowels ===
Northern Qiang distinguishes between unstressed and long vowels (signified by two small dots, "ː") for all of its vowels except for /ə/. In addition, there exist 15 diphthongs and one triphthong in the language of Northern Qiang.

Northern Qiang Vowel Inventory
	Front	Mid	Back
High	i, iː y, yː		u, uː
Mid	e, eː	ə	o, oː
Low	a, aː		ɑ, ɑː

There may not be a significant phonetic difference in sound between /i/ and /e/, and /u/ and /o/, respectively. In fact, they are often used in place of one another without changing the meaning.

==== Diphthongs and triphthongs ====
Diphthongs: ia, iɑ, ie, ye, eu, əu, ei, əi, oi, uɑ, ua, uə, ue, ui, ya

Triphthong: uəi

==== R-coloring ====
As the Northern Qiang language becomes more endangered, the use of r-coloring is not being passed down to younger generations of the Northern Qiang people. As a result, there is great variation in its use. R-coloring is not considered its own phoneme because it is a vowel feature and only used to produce vowel harmony (see below), most commonly signifying a first person plural marking.

- Example: miʴwu [person (<mi):all] 'all the people'

=== Syllable structure ===
The following is the Northern Qiang Syllable prototype structure. All are optional apart from the central vowel (underlined):

FCGVGCᴾF.

(The final 'fricative' may be a fricative F, an affricate ᴾF, or /l/.)

All consonants occur as initials, though /ŋ/ only before /u/, and /ɦ/ only in a directional prefix and in a filler interjection. Almost all apart from the aspirated consonants occur as finals. These do not preserve Proto-Tibeto-Burman finals, which have all been lost, but are the result of the reduction of unstressed syllables (e.g. [səf] 'tree' from /sə/ 'wood' + /pʰə/ 'forest').

Initial FC clusters may be:

/ʂ/ + /p t tɕ k q b d dʑ ɡ m/,
/x/ + /tɕ tʂ k s ʂ ɬ l dʑ dʐ z ʐ/,
/χ/ + /tʂ q s ʂ ɬ l d dʑ dʐ z ʐ n/

The fricatives are voiced to [ʐ ɣ ʁ] before a voiced consonant. In addition, /ʂ/ > [s z] before /t d/ and > [ɕ ʑ] before /pi pe bi tɕ dʑ/.

In final CᴾF clusters, the C is a fricative. Clusters include /ɕtɕ xʂ xtʂ xɬ ɣz ɣl χs/.

Examples of syllables permitted in Northern Qiang
Template	Qiang Word	Romanization	Translation
V	ɑ	a	'one'
VG	ɑu	au	'one pile'
GV	wə	we	'bird'
VC	ɑs	as	'one day'
VCF	əχʂ	evsh	'tight'
CV	pə	be	'buy'
CGV	kʰuə	kue	'dog'
CGVG	kuɑi-tʰɑ	guai-ta	'strange'
CVC	pɑq	bagv	'interest'
CVCF	bəxʂ	bbehsh	'honey'
CGVC	duɑp	dduab	'thigh'
FCV	xtʂe	hzhea	'louse'
FCGV	ʂkue	shguea	'roast'
FCGVG	ʂkuəi	shguei	'mt. goat'
FCVC	ʂpəl	shbel	'kidney'
FCVCF	ʂpəχs	shbevs	'Chibusu'
FCGVC	ʂquɑp	shgvuab	'quiet'
FCGVCF	ɕpiexɬ	xbieahlh	'scar'

=== Phonological processes ===
==== Initial weakening ====
When a compound or a directional prefix is added before an aspirated initial, the latter becomes the final of the preceding syllable in the new word. This typically causes it to lose its aspiration.

- Example: tə- DIR + ba 'big' > təwa 'become big'

==== Vowel harmony ====
Vowel harmony exists in the Mawo (麻窝) dialect. Typically, vowel harmony is used to match a preceding syllable's vowel with the succeeding vowel or its height. In some cases, however, the vowel of a succeeding syllable will harmonize in the opposite way, matching with the preceding vowel. This process occurs across syllables in compounds or in prefix + root combinations. Vowel harmony can also occur for r-coloring on the first syllable if the second syllable of a compound or prefix + root combination already has r-coloring.

- Example: wə 'bird' + ʂpu 'flock' > wuʂpu '(wild) pigeon'
- Example: Chinese zhàogù + Qiang pə 'to do' > tʂɑuku-pu 'take care of'
- Example: me 'not' + weʴ 'reduce' > meʴ-weʴ 'unceasingly'
- Example: The realization of the word "one" (a) is influenced by the classifiers:
  - e si (a day)
  - a qep (a can)
  - ɑ pɑu (a packet)
  - o ʁu (a barrel)
  - ɘ ʑu (a pile)
  - ø dy (a mouth)

==== Epenthetic vowel ====
The vowel /ə/ can be embedded within a collection of consonants that are restricted by the syllable canon. The epenthetic vowel is used to combine sounds that would typically be impermissible.

- Example: bəl-əs-je [do-NOM (< -s)-good to eat] 'advantageous'

==== Free variation ====
For some words, changing or adding consonants produces no phonological difference in meaning. The most common consonant interchange is between /ʂ/ and /χ/.

- Example: ʂqu ~ χqu 'mouth'
- Example: kɑp ~ kɑpətʂ 'orphan'

== Orthography ==
Northern Qiang Orthography
Letter	a	ae	b	bb	c	ch	d	dd	dh	e	ea	f	g	gg	gv	h	hh	hv	i	iu	j	jj	k	kv	l
IPA	a	æ	p	b	t͡sʰ	ʈ͡ʂʰ	t	d	ɖ͡ʐ	ə	e	f	k	g	q	x	ɣ	h	i	y	t͡ɕ	d͡ʑ	kʰ	qʰ	l

Letter	lh	m	n	ng	ny	o	p	ph	q	rr	s	sh	ss	t	u	v	vh	vv	w	x	xx	y	z	zh	zz
IPA	ɬ	m	n	ŋ	ȵ	o	pʰ	ɸ	t͡ɕʰ	ʐ	s	ʂ	z	tʰ	u	χ	ɦ	ʁ	w, u̥	ɕ	ʑ	j	t͡s	ʈ͡ʂ	d͡z

Nasalized vowels are indicated with trailing nn, rhotacized vowels are indicated with trailing r, long vowels are indicated by doubling the vowel letter.

== Morphology ==
Northern Qiang uses affixes in the form of prefixes and suffixes to describe or modify the meaning of nouns and verbs. Other morphological processes that are affixed include gender marking, marking of genitive case, compounding, and nominalization. Northern Qiang also uses non-affixational processes such as reduplication.

=== Noun phrase ===
In Northern Qiang, any combination of the following order is allowed as long as it follows this flow. Some of the items found below, such as adjectives, may be used twice within the same noun phrase.

==== Northern Qiang noun phrase structure ====
GEN phrase + Rel. clause + Noun + ADJ + DEM/DEF + (NUM + CL)/PL

==== Gender marking ====
Gender marking only occurs in animals. Typically, /mi/ is the suffix for females, while /zdu/ is the suffix for males.

- wə-mi 'mare'
- puɲu-zdu 'male cat'

==== Pronouns ====
Northern Qiang pronouns can be represented from the 1st, 2nd, or 3rd person, and can refer to one, two, or more than two people.

Northern Qiang Personal Pronouns
	Singular	Dual	Plural
1	qɑ	tɕi-zzi	tɕi-le
2	ʔũ	ʔi-zzi	ʔi-le
3	theː / qupu	thi-zzi	them-le

==== Genitive case ====
The genitive marker /-tɕ(ə)/ is placed on the modifying noun; this modifying noun will precede the noun it modifies.

qɑ-tɕ ləɣz
1sg-GEN book
'my book'

=== Verbal morphology ===
The meaning of verbs can be changed using prefixes and suffixes, or by using reduplication.

Verbal Prefixes
	Marking in Qiang	Purpose/Meaning
1		intensifying adverb
2	"various"	direction/orientation, or 3rd person indirect directive
3	/mə-/, or /tɕə-/	simple negation, or prohibitive
4	/tɕi/	continuative aspect

Verbal Suffixes
	Marking in Qiang	Purpose/Meaning
5	/-ʐ/	causative
6	/-ɑː/	prospective aspect
7	/kə/ or /lə/	'(to) go', or '(to) come' (auxiliary directional verbs)
8	/-jə/	repetition
9	/-ji/	change of state
10	/-l-/	1st person indirect directive
11	/-k/	inferential evidential, mirative
12	/-u/	visual evidential
13	/-ʂɑ/, /-sɑn/, /-ʂəʴ/, /-sɑi/, [-wu/ ~ -u]	non-actor person (1sg, 2sg, 1pl, 2pl, 3sg/pl)
14	/-ɑ/, /-n/, /-əʴ/, /-i/, /-tɕi/	actor person (1sg, 2sg, 1pl, 2pl, 3pl)
15	/-i/	hearsay evidential

==== Reduplication ====
Repetition of the same root verb signifies a reciprocal action upon one actors, or an ongoing action.

- Example: mɑ 'plaster (a wall)' > məmɑ 'be plastering'

=== Other morphological processes ===
==== Compounding ====
In Northern Qiang, the modifying noun of the compound must precede the modified noun.

khuɑ-ʁl
dog-child
'puppy'

==== Nominalization ====
Nouns are created from adjectives or verbs using clitics /-s/, /-m/, or /-tɕ/, the indefinite markers /le/ or /te/, or the definite marker /ke/.

tɑwə-tɑ-m le-ze
hat-wear-NOM DEF-CL
'the person wearing a hat'

== Syntax ==
The Northern Qiang language has quite a predictable syntax without many variations. The typical basic word order is subject–object–verb (SOV). Northern Qiang borrows some Mandarin Chinese words and phrases.

=== Clause structure ===
==== Order ====
(TEMP) (LOC) (ACTOR) (GOAL/RECIPIENT) (ADV) (UG) VC (PART)

(TEMP = temporal phrase; UG = undergoer; VC = verb complex; PART = clause-final particle)

A sentence in Northern Qiang may be as short as a verb complex, which may just be a predicate noun.

As shown from the order stated above, Northern Qiang is a language with a SOV sentence structure.

S O V
χumtʂi ʐətɕʰaq-e-ze ɦɑ-tʂ
Xumtʂi rabbit-one-CL DIR-pierce(kill)
'Xumtʂi killed a rabbit.'

==== Code mixing ====
Many loan words or loan phrases from Mandarin are borrowed, but the word order of these phrases is rearranged to fit the grammatical structure of Northern Qiang.

pəs-ŋuəɳi ʐmətʂi-sətsim-leː tɕiutɕin ʂə mi-leː ŋuə-ŋuɑ?
today-TOP emperor-wife-DEF:CL (after.all be) person-DEF:CL COP-Q
'Today, is the emperor's wife a human?'

In this sentence, the words "tɕiutɕin" and "ʂə" are borrowed from Mandarin.

== Status ==
As with many Qiangic languages, Northern Qiang is becoming increasingly threatened. Because the education system largely uses Standard Chinese as a medium of instruction for the Qiang people, and as a result of the universal access to schooling and television, most Qiang children are fluent or even monolingual in Chinese while an increasing percentage cannot speak Qiang. Much of the population marry people from other parts of China who only speak Mandarin.

== See also ==
- Qiangic languages
- Qiang people

== Bibliography ==
- Bradley, David (1997). "Tibeto-Burman Languages and Classification" (PDF). In Bradley, D. (ed.). Papers in South East Asian Linguistics No. 14: Tibeto-Burman Languages of the Himalayas. Canberra: Pacific Linguistics. pp. 1–72. ISBN 0-85883-456-1. Archived (PDF) from the original on 2017-10-11.
- LaPolla, Randy (2003). A Grammar of Qiang: With Annotated Texts and Glossary. with Chenglong Huang. Berlin: Mouton de Gruyter. ISBN 3-11-017829-X.
- Evans, Jonathan P. (2006). "Vowel Quality in Hongyan Qiang" (PDF). Language and Linguistics. 7 (4): 937–960. Archived (PDF) from the original on 2021-08-21.
