= 2017 Sichuan landslide =

Landslide in Sichuan, China

- 2017 Sichuan landslide (Sichuan)
- Native name: 2017年茂县山体垮塌事件
- English name: 2017 Sichuan landslide
- Date: 24 June 2017 (23 June 2017)
- Time: 5:38:55 CST (21:38 UTC 23 June)
- Location: Xinmo Village, Diexi Town, Mao County, Ngawa Prefecture, Sichuan Province (四川省阿坝藏族羌族自治州茂县叠溪镇新磨村); 32.0663°N 103.6504°E
- Deaths: 83

A landslide occurred at about 05:38 local time on 24 June 2017 in Diexi Town, Mao County, Sichuan Province in south-western China. It destroyed 40 homes in Xinmo Village and killed 83 people. A second smaller landslide at around 17:19 impeded rescue efforts.

== Background ==
The location of Mao County between the Tibetan Plateau and the Sichuan Basin is characterized by deep mountain canyons with exposed batholith. In 1933, the landslide site became especially unstable after the 7.3-magnitude Diexi earthquake, whose epicenter was only a few kilometers away from Xinmo Village. Major geological hazards occur on almost a yearly basis.

Ngawa Tibetan and Qiang Autonomous Prefecture, also known as Aba, where Mao County is located, was one of the regions worst affected by the 2008 Sichuan earthquake. During the earthquake, 20,258 people in Aba and 3,933 in Mao County were confirmed killed, and 8,183 people in Mao County were injured. A large factor in the fatality rate during both the 1933 and 2008 earthquakes was the landslides and the subsequent formation of landslide dam lakes. During the 1933 earthquake, a catastrophic landslide lake outburst flood occurred on the Minjiang River, which has its headwaters in Aba Prefecture and runs through the region of the landslide.

The majority of Mao County residents, almost 90%, are of the Qiang ethnicity. Large numbers of students had also returned home from university studies. The landslide site is located near the locally known Songpinggou scenic area, where many tourists were staying in guest houses when the landslide struck.

== Landslide ==
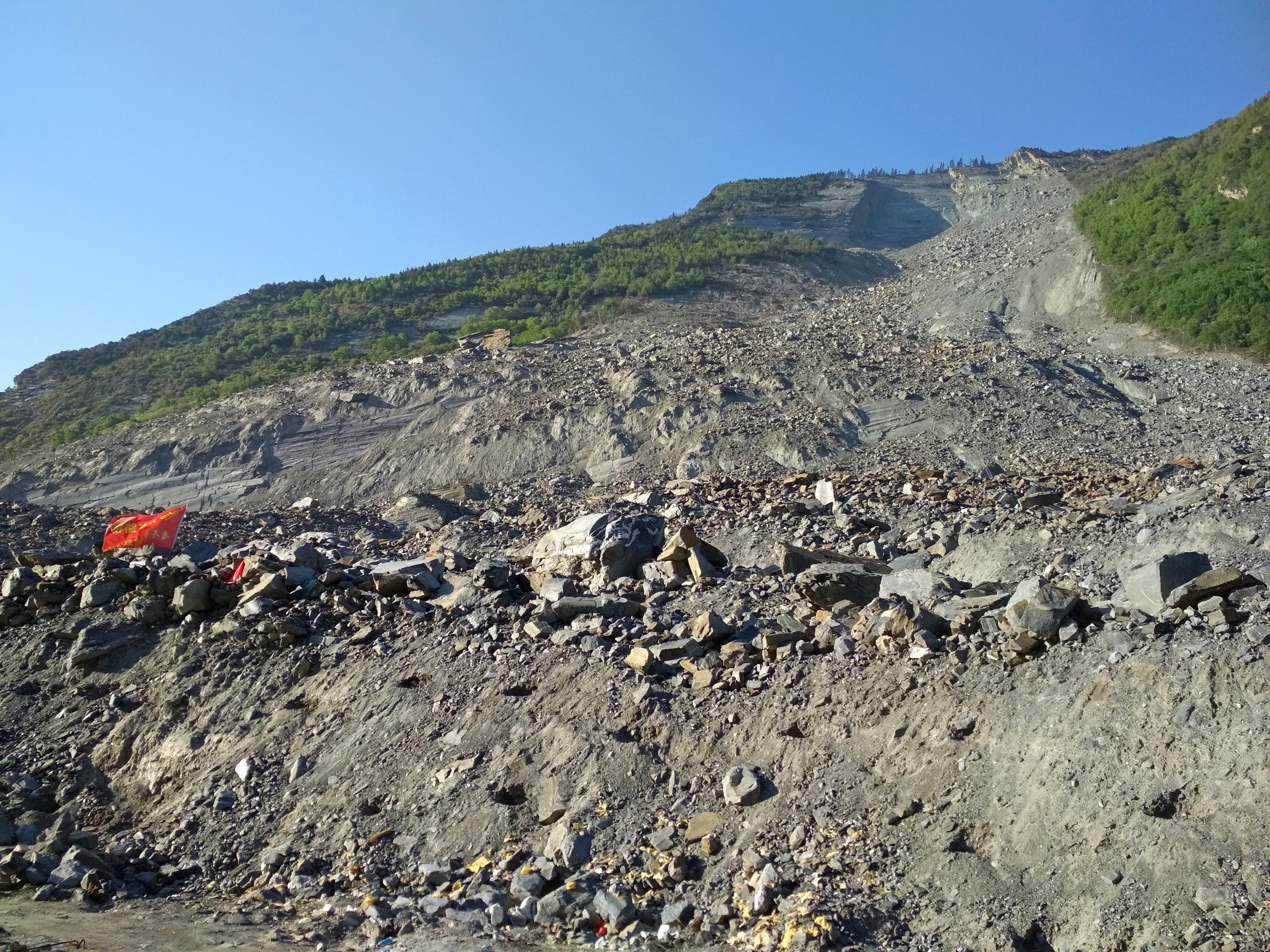
The debris of the Xinmo village landslide as seen on 15 May 2018 from the reconstructed road. A red flag stands in memory of the victims.

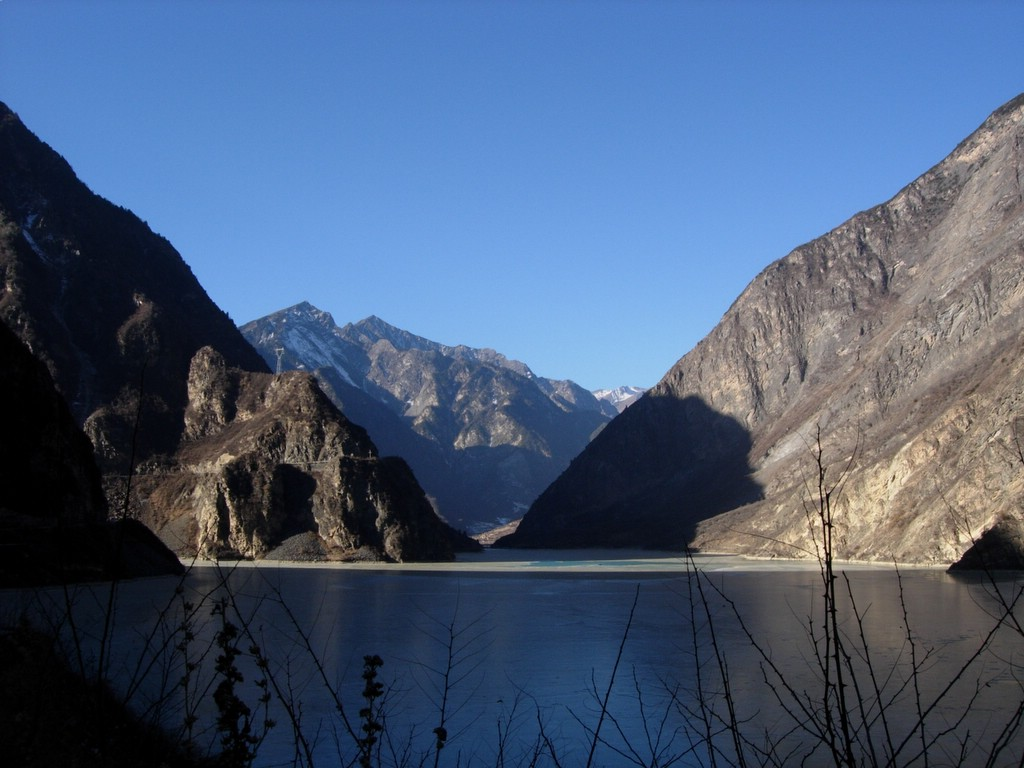
Diexi Lake, 1.9 kilometers from the 2017 landslide site, was created by a landslide over the Minjiang River in the 1933 earthquake.

Before and after satellite imagery of the affected area

The landslide occurred in the early morning on 24 June 2017 at about 05:38 local time (21:38 on 23 June UTC). It was preceded by three weeks of frequent, but not intense rains. Forty homes were destroyed in Xinmo Village (新磨村), where more than 140 people from at least 62 families were initially feared buried. The landslide also blocked a 1.2-kilometre (0.75 mi) stretch of the Songping Stream (松坪沟), as well as a 1,600 m section of road. Approximately 4.5 million m^{3} (160 million cu ft) of rock was displaced from the mountain crest. However, while avalanching downslope, the rock mass fragmented heavily and incorporated a large amount of pre-existing debris. The landslide finally formed a deposit of more than 13 million m^{3} (460 million cu ft). The mass covered a distance of more than 2,600 m with a height relief of almost 1,200 m in less than 60 seconds. It was estimated that the landslide hit the village at approximately 250 km/h.

A second smaller landslide at around 20:15 on 24 June affected the rescue work. At least 1,959 rescue and medical workers were involved in the recovery effort. Fears of new landslides from the adjacent areas temporarily halted the work, which was resumed after the installation of a monitoring system capable of providing a timely alarm. Subsequent engineering analyses confirmed the possibility of new landslides coming from the same ridge. They could run on the 2017 landslide deposit but also toward still-inhabited buildings located just upstream, and could potentially block the flow of the Songping Stream again.

The landslide is thought to be a delayed effect of the rock weakening and cracking caused by the 1933 Diexi earthquake, which accelerated the chemo-mechanical degradation of the rock. On the contrary, no apparent correlation with the 2008 Sichuan earthquake was found.

After the event, several cracks were identified from satellite imagery and significant surface deformation was found to have preceded the landslide by several months. However, these precursory signals went unnoticed as no systematic remote sensing of the area was being carried out, and the cracks were not visible from the town or from the valley.

== Aftermath and recovery efforts ==
Three people from the same family had been pulled alive from the rubble by the evening of 24 June. By 10:00 on 25 June, 15 people had been confirmed killed, with a further 118 listed as missing. By 14:00 on the same day, the number of missing was reduced to 93, after more people were confirmed to be alive or were rescued.

At least 300 people who survived the landslide were relocated to facilities in Diexi town, including a school and a hotel. The prefecture's civil affairs bureau sent clothing, two electric generators, 20 tents and 400 quilts to the survivors.

During disaster relief, People's Armed Police 3rd Hydropower Corps 12th Detachment Sergeant Xu Wen was killed by a traffic accident while transporting aid; he was posthumously awarded martyr status.

== See also ==
- 2010 Gansu mudslide
- 1933 Diexi earthquake
- 2008 Sichuan earthquake
