= Diexi =

Diexi may refer to:

- Diexi, Mao County, town in Mao County, Sichuan, China
- Diexi Lake, lake in Mao County, Sichuan, China
