= Qiang language =

Dialect continuum of Sichuan, China

Qiang
- Geographic distribution: Sichuan Province
- Ethnicity: Qiang people
- Linguistic classification: Sino-Tibetan: Tibeto-Burman; Qiangic; Qiang
- Subdivisions: Northern Qiang; Southern Qiang

Language codes
- Glottolog: qian1264
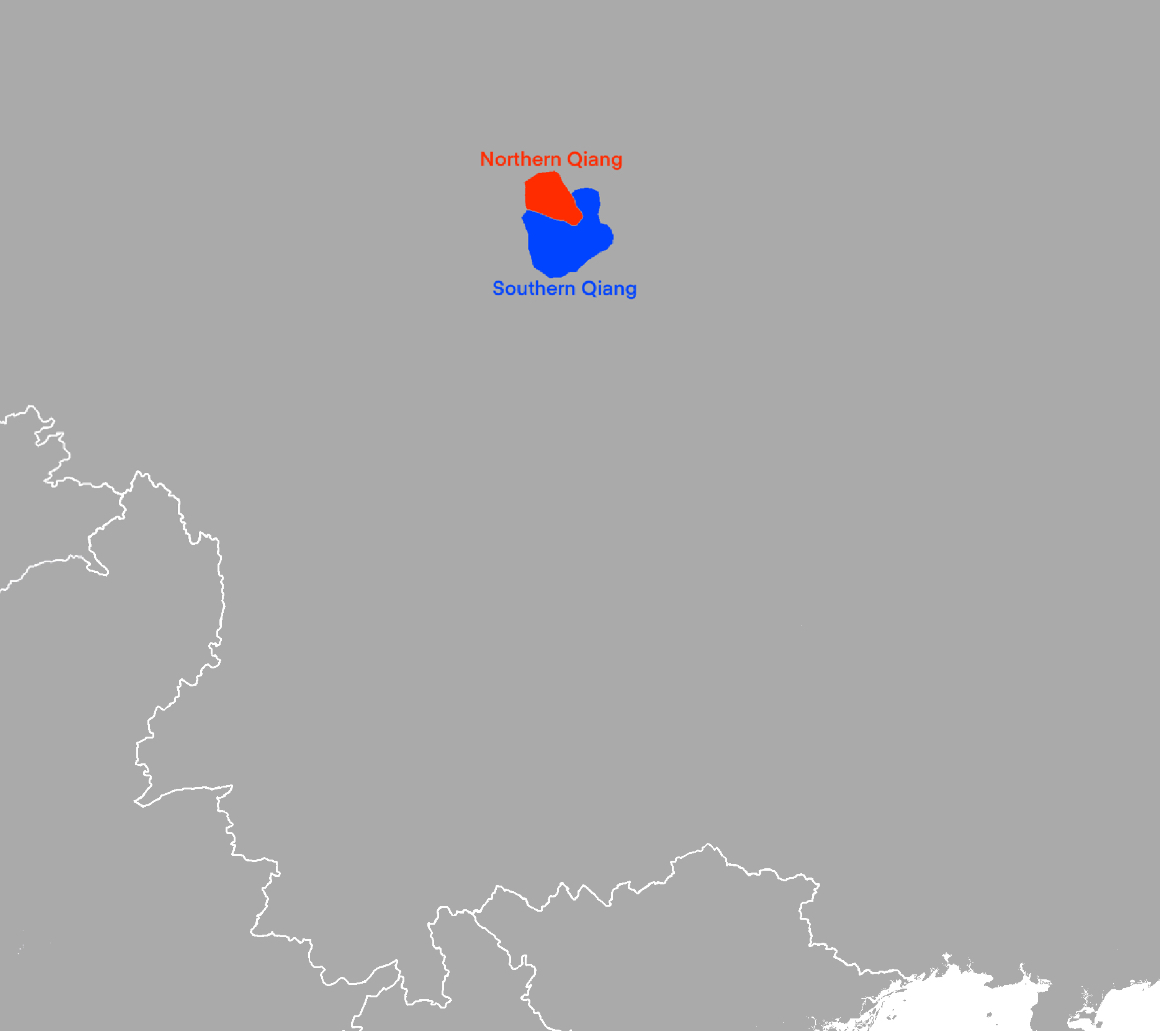

Qiang (also Qiangish languages or Rma languages), called Rma (尔玛) or Rme by its speakers, and formerly spelled Kʻiang, is a Sino-Tibetan language cluster of the Qiangic branch spoken by approximately 140,000 people in north-central Sichuan Province, China.

Qiang consists of:

- Northern Qiang language (a non-tonal language)
- Southern Qiang language (a tonal language)

== Writing systems ==
=== Qiang Phonetic Alphabet Scheme ===
There have been two phonetic writing systems for Qiang commissioned by PRC authorities, both based on the Latin-script alphabet. The first design was commissioned centrally in 1958 following early PRC work on distinguishing minority ethnic groups in China, but was never officially promoted. The second system, known as the Qiang Phonetic Alphabet Scheme (羌族拼音文字方案; Qiāngzú Pīnyīn Wénzì Fāng'àn) was commissioned by the local government of Ngawa Tibetan and Qiang Autonomous Prefecture and the provincial Ethnic Affairs Commission (EAC) of Sichuan in 1989. The Qiang Phonetic Alphabet Scheme uses the 26 standard English alphabet letters, and is a standardised form based on the Qugu Qiang dialect, which belongs to the Northern dialect area but roughly situated at the linguistic middle point between the two dialects.

The Qiang Phonetic Alphabet Scheme was completed in late 1990 and was approved for trial operation by the Sichuan provincial government in 1991, in tandem with recommending the Scheme for official approval by the National Ethnic Affairs Commission (NEAC) in 1991. In 1993, the NEAC requested the Chinese Academy of Social Sciences to organise an academic review, which concluded favourably, but the NEAC only informed their approval of the scheme to the provincial EAC by telephone. The Qiang Phonetic Alphabet Scheme never ended up being officially published by the NEAC or other national authorities thereafter, although the Scheme was acknowledged as legitimate in one written report from the NEAC to the central government in 1999.

In 2015, the Beichuan Qiang Autonomous County government commissioned a Qiang language graded reader for schools, which uses the Qiang Phonetic Alphabet Scheme.

In 2019, a local TV station at Mao County started a weekly news programme using the Qiang language and the Latin-based alphabet.

=== Rma script ===
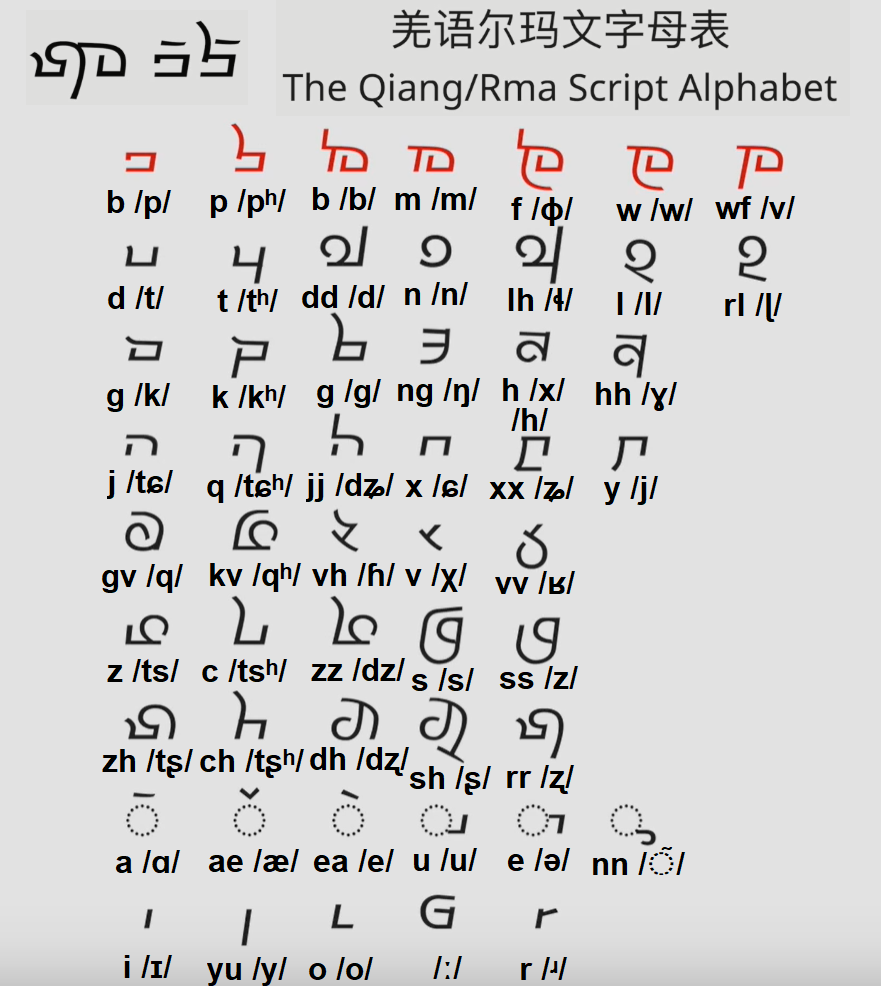
Rma Script from Qiang Language

In 2017, Wei Jiuqiao (魏久乔) finalised their design of the Rma script. There is no published information as to whether the script is compatible with both the Northern Qiang language and the Southern Qiang language or if it is only compatible with one of the languages. In 2022, preliminary proposal was made to encode this system in the Universal Character Set of Unicode.

Consonants

b /p/	p /pʰ/	bb /b/	m /m/	f /f/	w /w/	wf /v/
d /t/	t /tʰ/	dd /d/	n /n/	lh /ɬ/	l /l/	lr /lʴ/
g /k/	k /kʰ/	gg /ɡ/	ng /ŋ/	h /h/	hh /ɣ/	—N/a
j /tɕ/	q /tɕʰ/	jj /dʑ/	x /ɕ/	xx /ʑ/	y /j/	—N/a
gv /q/	kv /qʰ/	v /χ/	vh /ɦ/	vv /ʁ/	—N/a	—N/a
z /ts/	c /tsʰ/	zz /dz/	s /s/	ss /z/	—N/a	—N/a
zh /tʂ/	ch /tʂʰ/	dh /dʐ/	sh /ʂ/	rr /ʐ/	—N/a	—N/a

Vowels

a /a/	ae /æ/	ea /e/	u /u/	e /ə/	nn /◌̃/
i /i/	ü /y/	o /o/	/ʔ/	r /ʴ/	—N/a

== Classification ==
=== Sims (2016) ===
Sims (2016) gives the following classification for the "Qiangish" (or "Rma") languages, which include Northern Qiang and Southern Qiang. Individual dialects are highlighted in italics.

Qiangish

- Northern Qiang ('upstream' *nu- innovation group)
  - NW Heishui: Luhua 芦花镇
  - Central Heishui
    - Qinglang 晴朗乡
    - Zhawo 扎窝乡
    - Ciba 慈坝乡
    - Shuangliusuo 双溜索乡
    - uvular V's innovation group: Zhimulin 知木林乡, Hongyan 红岩乡, Mawo 麻窝乡
  - SE Heishui: Luoduo 洛多乡, Longba 龙坝乡, Musu 木苏乡, Shidiaolou 石碉楼乡
  - North Maoxian: Taiping 太平乡, Songpinggou 松坪沟乡
  - South Songpan: Xiaoxing 小姓乡, Zhenjiangguan 镇江关乡, Zhenping 镇坪乡
  - West Maoxian / South Heishui: Weigu 维古乡, Waboliangzi 瓦钵乡梁子, Se'ergu 色尔古镇, Ekou, Weicheng 维城乡, Ronghong, Chibusu 赤不苏镇, Qugu 曲谷乡 [basis for written language], Wadi 洼底乡, Baixi 白溪乡, Huilong 回龙乡, Sanlong 三龙乡
  - Central Maoxian: Heihu 黑虎乡
  - SE Maoxian (reflexive marker innovation): Goukou 沟口乡, Yonghe 永和乡
- Southern Qiang (perfective agreement suffixes innovation group)
  - 'inward' *ji innovation subgroup
    - North Wenchuan: Longxi 龙溪乡
    - South Wenchuan: Miansi 绵虒镇
  - 'downward' *ɚ innovation subgroup
    - Western Lixian: Puxi 蒲溪乡, Xuecheng 薛城镇, Muka 木卡乡, Jiuzi 九子村
    - Eastern Lixian: Taoping 桃坪乡, Tonghua 通化乡

=== Sun, Liu & Huang (2024) ===
Sun, Liu & Huang (2024) list the following dialects of Southern Qiang and Northern Qiang.

Region	Dialect	Distribution	Population
Southern	Daqishan (大岐山)	Li County (理县): Xuecheng (薛城), Shangmeng (上孟), Xiameng (下孟), Xinglong (兴龙), Ganbao (甘堡), Liedai (列歹), Jiuzi (九子), Muka (木卡), Putou (朴头), Puxi (蒲溪), etc.	7,400
Southern	Taoping (桃坪)	Li County (理县): Taoping (桃坪), Jiashan (佳山), Ganxi (甘溪), Sancha (三叉), Zengtou (曾头), Niushan (牛山), Xishang (西商), Tonghua (通化), Gucheng (古城), etc.	4,900
Southern	Longxi (龙溪)	Wenchuan County (汶川县): Longxi (龙溪), Bulan (布兰), Baduo (巴夺), Xiazhuang (下庄), Mushang (木上), etc.	3,300
Southern	Miansi (绵虒)	Wenchuan County (汶川县): areas within Wenchuan County (汶川县) other than where the Longxi dialect (龙溪土语) is spoken	15,700
Southern	Goukou (沟口)–Weimen (渭门)	Mao County (茂县): Heihu (黑虎), Sujiaping (苏加坪), Feihong (飞虹), Goukou (沟口), Weimen (渭门), Jiaoyuanping (椒园坪), etc.	16,000
Southern	Sanlong (三龙)	Mao County (茂县): Fengyi (凤仪), Sanlong (三龙), Shaba (沙坝), Huilong (回龙), Baixi (白溪), Wadi (洼底), Yazhuzhai (雅珠寨), etc.	15,000
Southern	Zhenjiangguan (镇江关)	Mao County (茂县): Jiaochang (较场), Shidaguan (石大关), Taiping (太平), Songpinggou (松坪沟), etc.; the area west of Zhenjiangguan (镇江关) in Songpan County (松潘县) and some areas in Beichuan County (北川县)	19,000
Northern	Yadu (雅都)	Mao County (茂县): Chibusu (赤不苏), Yadu (雅都), Qugu (曲谷), Weicheng (维城) 以及 Heishui County (黑水县): Waboliangzi (瓦钵梁子), Se'ergu (色尔古), etc.	23,000
Northern	Weigu (维古)	Heishui County (黑水县): Weigu (维古), Musu (木苏), Longba (龙坝), Luoduo (洛多), Shidiaolou (石碉楼), etc.	11,000
Northern	Mawo (麻窝)	Heishui County (黑水县): Mawo (麻窝), Zhawo (扎窝), Shuangliusuo (双溜索), Xi'er (西尔), Hongyan (红岩), E'en (俄恩), etc.	12,000
Northern	Cimulin (茨木林)	Heishui County (黑水县): Cimulin (茨木林), Gewo (格窝), Wumushu (乌木树), Rewo (热窝), Qinglanggou (晴朗沟), etc.	9,800
Northern	Luhua (芦花)	Heishui County (黑水县): Luhua (芦花), Shashiduo (沙石多), Yangrong (羊茸), Zegai (泽盖), Ergulu (二古鲁), Zhuogedu (卓格都), etc.	14,000

The following Qiang dialects are documented in the comparative vocabulary table section of Sun, Liu & Huang (2024).

- Daqishan (大岐山)
- Taoping (桃坪); Zengtou (曾头)
- Longxi (龙溪)
- Miansi (绵虒); Suoqiao (索桥)
- Goukou (沟口); Heihu (黑虎); Longchi (龙池)
- Sanlong (三龙)
- Qugu (曲谷)
- Yadu (雅都)
- Weigu (维古); Longba (龙坝); Musu (木苏)
- Cimulin (茨木林)
- Zhawo (扎窝); Mawo (麻窝)
- Luhua (芦花); Yangrong (羊茸)
- Songpan (松潘)

== Vocabulary ==
Autonyms (自称) by Qiang dialect, as well as the word for 'person, human being' (人):

Dialect	autonym (Qiang)	person
Dàqíshān (大岐山)	ʁma⁵³	mə³¹tsɿ⁵³
Táopíng (桃坪)	χma³³	mə³³
Zēngtóu (曾头)	χmɑ⁵⁵	mə³³
Lóngxī (龙溪)	mɑ⁵⁵	mu³¹
Miánchí (绵篪)	mɑ³¹	ma⁵³
Suǒqiáo (索桥)	ʐmi³¹	ɦmə³¹
Gōukǒu (沟口)	mɤ⁵⁵	tʂe³³tʂy⁵⁵
Hēihǔ (黑虎)	məʴ⁵⁵	ba³³fə⁵⁵
Lóngchí (龙池)	ʐme⁵⁵	mi⁵⁵
Sānlóng (三龙)	ʐme⁵⁵	mi⁵⁵
Qūgǔ (曲谷)	ɹme	mi
Yǎdū (雅都)	ʐme	mi
Wéigǔ (维古)	rma	mi
Lóngbà (龙坝)	rma	mi
Mùsū (木苏)	rma	mi
Címùlín (茨木林)	rme	nə
Zhāwō (扎窝)	rma	nə
Máwō (麻窝)	rma	nə
Lúhuā (芦花)	rme	na
Yángróng (羊茸)	rme	ȵə
Sōngpān (松潘)	ɣmep	ȵi

A few basic body part words:

Dialect	eye	nose	ear	hand
Dàqíshān (大岐山)	mi⁴²	χmə³ ~χəm̩³³ pa⁵⁵qa³¹	n̥³³ke⁵⁵	i⁵⁵
Táopíng (桃坪)	mi⁵⁵	xni³¹qo⁵⁵pə³³	ni³¹ke³³	i³³
Zēngtóu (曾头)	mi⁵⁵	xni³¹qo⁵⁵pə³³	ni³¹kie⁵⁵	i⁵⁵
Lóngxī (龙溪)	ni⁵⁵mɑ⁵⁵to³¹	ti³³pɑ⁵⁵pi³³	ni³³qɑ⁵⁵	li³³pɑ⁵⁵
Miánchí (绵篪)	ma³³tie⁵⁵	n̩³³qo⁵⁵pə³³	nə³¹ka⁵⁵	i³³pɑ⁵⁵
Suǒqiáo (索桥)	mi⁵⁵	ɕi³¹qə⁵⁵	niu³¹ku⁵⁵	li³¹
Gōukǒu (沟口)	mi⁵⁵	tɑ³³kɑp⁵⁵	nɤʂ³³ke⁵⁵	ʐi⁵⁵pɑ⁵⁵
Hēihǔ (黑虎)	mi⁵⁵mi⁵⁵	stə³³pɑʴq⁵⁵	nə⁵⁵ku̥ə̥⁵⁵	dʐɑ³³pɑ⁵⁵
Lóngchí (龙池)	mi⁵⁵mi⁵⁵	ɕtiq⁵⁵	niuk⁵⁵	lɑ³³pɑ⁵⁵
Sānlóng (三龙)	mi⁵⁵mi⁵⁵	stə⁵⁵pɑq⁵⁵	nə⁵⁵ku̥ə̥³¹	iɑ³³pɑ⁵⁵
Qūgǔ (曲谷)	–	stuətsqɑp	nəku̥ə̥	iɑpɑ
Yǎdū (雅都)	mei	ɕtɕyəs	nə⁵⁵ku̥ə̥	ipɑ
Wéigǔ (维古)	meː	ʂtʂəq	ȵiku̥ə̥	iːpɑ
Lóngbà (龙坝)	mei	ʂəq	ȵi⁵⁵ku̥ə̥	ipɑ
Mùsū (木苏)	me	ʂtʂəq	nəku̥ə̥	ɿəpɑ
Címùlín (茨木林)	qən	stəqə	nəku̥ə̥	dʐipɑ
Zhāwō (扎窝)	qən	stəq	nəku‘	dʐapɑ
Máwō (麻窝)	qən	stɤq	nəku̥ə̥	dʒəpɑ
Lúhuā (芦花)	qən	stəq	nəku̥	dʒəpɑ
Yángróng (羊茸)	qəȵə	stəndʐʉ	ȵək uə	dʒəpɑ
Sōngpān (松潘)	miȵi	xtəq	ȵuku̥	lapa

== Reconstruction ==
Sims (2017) reconstructs tones for Proto-Rma (alternatively called Proto-Qiangish), proposing that the lack of tones in Northern Qiang is due to Tibetan influence. High tones and low tones are reconstructed for Proto-Rma, as well as for Proto-Prinmi.

== Bibliography ==
- Bradley, David (1997). "Tibeto-Burman Languages and Classification" (PDF). In Bradley, D. (ed.). Papers in South East Asian Linguistics No. 14: Tibeto-Burman Languages of the Himalayas. Canberra: Pacific Linguistics. pp. 1–72. ISBN 0-85883-456-1.
- Evans, Jonathan P. (2006). "Vowel Quality in Hongyan Qiang" (PDF). Language and Linguistics. 7 (4): 731–754. Archived from the original (PDF) on 2021-11-14.
- Huáng, Chénglóng; Wáng, Bǎofēng; Máo, Míngjūn; Zhāng, Xī [黄成龙，王保锋，毛明军，张曦] (2019). Sìchuān Sōngpān Qiāngyǔ [四川松潘羌语]. Beijing: Commercial Press [商务印书馆].
- LaPolla, Randy J. (2003). A Grammar of Qiang: With Annotated Texts and Glossary. with Chenglong Huang. Berlin: Mouton de Gruyter. doi:10.1515/9783110197273. ISBN 3-11-017829-X.
