= Mao County =

County in Sichuan Province, China

Mao County 茂县 · མའོ་རྫོང་། · Shgvunyi Maoxian
- County
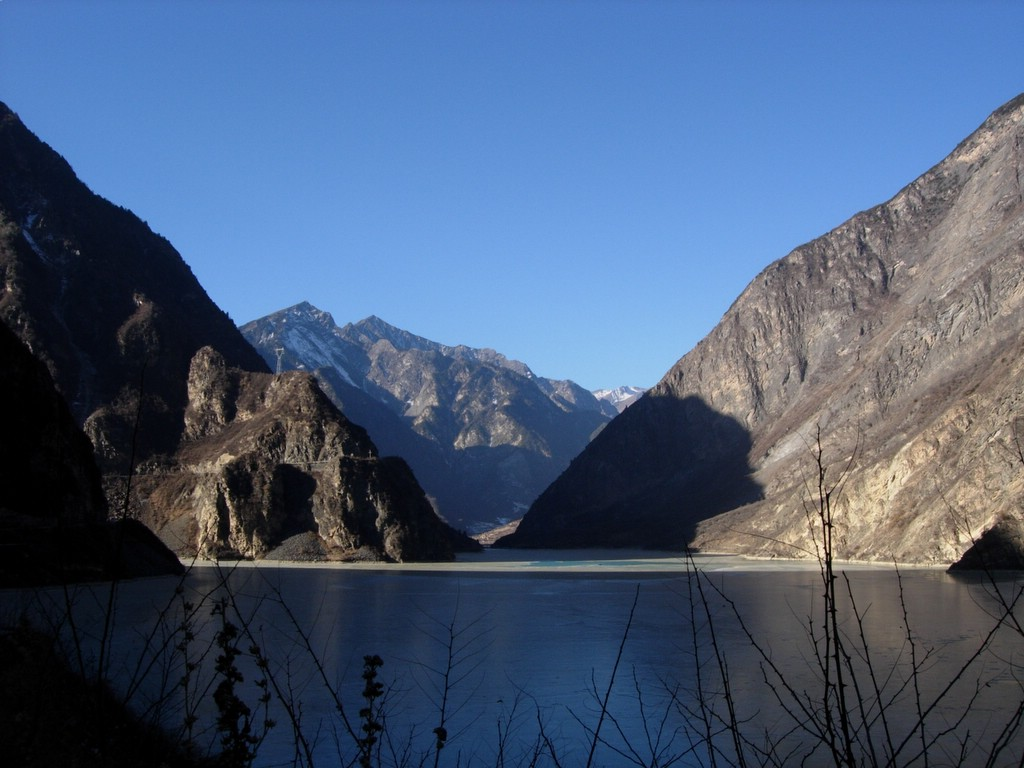
- Diexi Lake, in Diexi

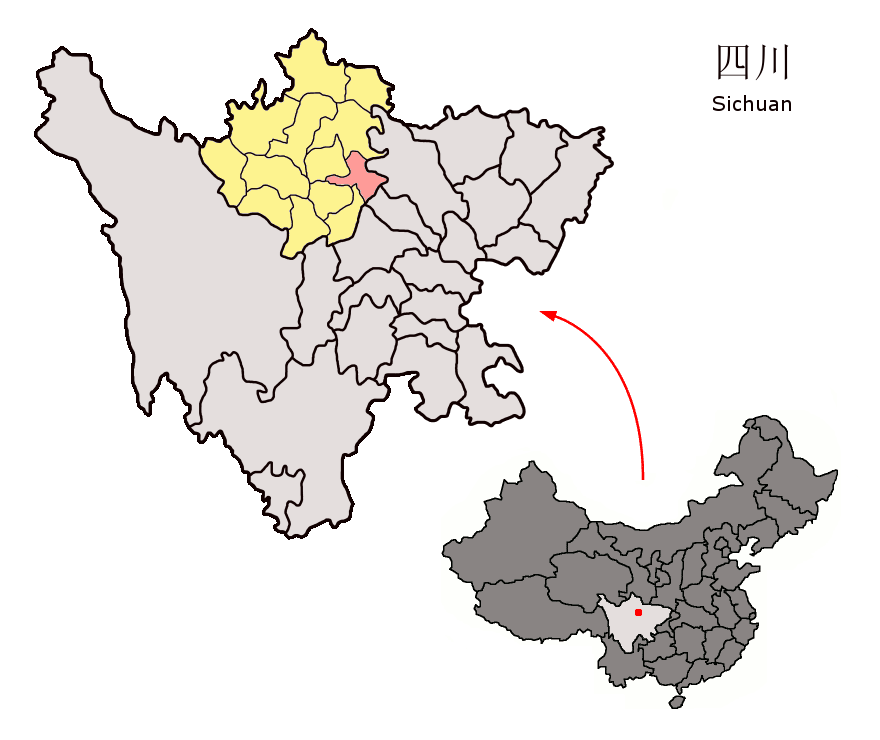
- Mao County (red) in Ngawa (yellow) and Sichuan

- Location of the seat in Sichuan Mao County (China)
- Coordinates: 31°50′N 103°30′E
- Country: China
- Province: Sichuan
- Autonomous prefecture: Ngawa
- County seat: Fengyi

Area
  - Total: 4,064 km^{2} (1,569 sq mi)

Population (2020)
  - Total: 95,361
  - Density: 23.46/km^{2} (60.77/sq mi)
  - Major nationalities: Qiang−88.9% Han Tibetan
- Time zone: UTC+08:00 (China Standard)
- Postal code: 623200
- Area code: 0837
- Website: www.maoxian.gov.cn

Mao County

Chinese name
- Simplified Chinese: 茂县
- Traditional Chinese: 茂縣
Transcriptions
Standard Mandarin
- Hanyu Pinyin: Mào Xiàn

Tibetan name
- Tibetan: མའོ་རྫོང་།
Transcriptions
- Wylie: ma'o rdzong
- Tibetan Pinyin: Mao Zong

Qiang name
- Qiang: Shgvunyi

Mao County or Maoxian (Chinese: 茂县; Tibetan: མའོ་རྫོང་།; Qiang: Shgvunyi) is a county in Ngawa Prefecture, Sichuan Province, China.

It has an area of 3,903 and a population of 106,700 as of 2006. 88.9% of the population are Qiang people. The county seat is Fengyi Town.

== Natural disasters ==
In 1933, an earthquake occurred near Diexi.

In 2017, a landslide occurred in Xinmo Village (新磨村), Diexi.

== Administrative divisions ==
Mao County has 11 towns.

Name	Simplified Chinese	Hanyu Pinyin	Tibetan	Wylie	Qiang	Administrative division code
Towns
Fengyi Town (Fünyi)	凤仪镇	Fèngyí Zhèn	ཧྥུན་ཡིས་གྲོང་རྡལ།	hphun yis grong rdal		513223100
Nanxin Town (Nainxin)	南新镇	Nánxīn Zhèn	ནན་ཤིན་གྲོང་རྡལ།	nan shin grong rdal		513223101
Diexi Town (Dêxi)	叠溪镇	Diéxī Zhèn	ཏེ་ཞི་གྲོང་རྡལ།	te zhi grong rdal		513223102
Fushun Town (Foshung)	富顺镇	Fùshùn Zhèn	ཧྥོ་ཧྲུང་གྲོང་རྡལ།	hpho hrung grong rdal		513223105
Tumen Town (Tumin)	土门镇	Tǔmén Zhèn	ཐུའུ་མིན་གྲོང་རྡལ།	thu'u min grong rdal		513223107
Wadi Town (Wadü)	洼底镇	Wādǐ Zhèn	བ་ཏུས་གྲོང་རྡལ།	ba tus grong rdal	Vvuaji	513223109
Shaba Town	沙坝镇	Shābà Zhèn			Zhewa	513223110
Weimen Town (Wümoin)	渭门镇	Wèimén Zhèn	ཝུའེ་མོན་གྲོང་རྡལ།	wu'e mon grong rdal		513223111
Heihu Town	黑虎镇	Hēihǔ Zhèn	ཧྭེ་ཧུའུ་གྲོང་རྡལ།	hwe hu'u grong rdal		513223112
Goukou Town	沟口镇	Gōukǒu Zhèn	གུག་ཁུག་གྲོང་རྡལ།	gug khug grong rdal		513223113
Chibusu Town	赤不苏镇	Chìbúsū Zhèn	ཁྲི་པུའུ་སུའུ་གྲོང་རྡལ།	khri pu'u su'u grong rdal	Shbuvs	513223114

== Transport ==
- China National Highway 213

== Climate ==
Climate data for Maoxian, elevation 1,590 m (5,220 ft), (1991–2020 normals, extremes 1981–2010)
Month	Jan	Feb	Mar	Apr	May	Jun	Jul	Aug	Sep	Oct	Nov	Dec	Year
Record high °C (°F)	18.2 (64.8)	26.3 (79.3)	29.0 (84.2)	28.3 (82.9)	30.3 (86.5)	29.7 (85.5)	32.2 (90.0)	31.6 (88.9)	29.4 (84.9)	25.6 (78.1)	22.8 (73.0)	20.4 (68.7)	32.2 (90.0)
Mean daily maximum °C (°F)	5.9 (42.6)	8.1 (46.6)	12.4 (54.3)	17.8 (64.0)	21.0 (69.8)	23.7 (74.7)	25.8 (78.4)	25.4 (77.7)	21.4 (70.5)	16.6 (61.9)	12.6 (54.7)	7.8 (46.0)	16.5 (61.8)
Daily mean °C (°F)	1.1 (34.0)	3.3 (37.9)	7.3 (45.1)	12.2 (54.0)	15.8 (60.4)	18.7 (65.7)	20.9 (69.6)	20.5 (68.9)	16.9 (62.4)	12.2 (54.0)	7.4 (45.3)	2.5 (36.5)	11.6 (52.8)
Mean daily minimum °C (°F)	−2.4 (27.7)	0.0 (32.0)	3.6 (38.5)	7.8 (46.0)	11.4 (52.5)	14.5 (58.1)	16.7 (62.1)	16.5 (61.7)	13.7 (56.7)	9.2 (48.6)	3.6 (38.5)	−1.3 (29.7)	7.8 (46.0)
Record low °C (°F)	−11.5 (11.3)	−10.4 (13.3)	−8.5 (16.7)	−0.7 (30.7)	2.2 (36.0)	7.0 (44.6)	9.9 (49.8)	7.8 (46.0)	4.5 (40.1)	−0.9 (30.4)	−5.4 (22.3)	−10.4 (13.3)	−11.5 (11.3)
Average precipitation mm (inches)	3.2 (0.13)	5.7 (0.22)	22.6 (0.89)	49.1 (1.93)	67.6 (2.66)	79.0 (3.11)	70.0 (2.76)	71.8 (2.83)	52.6 (2.07)	41.3 (1.63)	9.8 (0.39)	1.9 (0.07)	474.6 (18.69)
Average precipitation days (≥ 0.1 mm)	6.6	7.8	12.5	15.7	18.2	18.1	15.8	14.2	15.1	16.1	6.5	3.7	150.3
Average snowy days	14.9	11.1	4.1	0.3	0	0	0	0	0	0	1.4	7.9	39.7
Average relative humidity (%)	68	70	71	71	73	77	77	77	80	80	76	70	74
Mean monthly sunshine hours	133.2	114.2	128.2	149.1	148.2	123.7	144.3	150.4	92.9	92.3	125.5	134.7	1,536.7
Percentage possible sunshine	42	36	34	38	35	29	34	37	25	26	40	43	35
Source: China Meteorological Administration
