= Lizhou (disambiguation) =

Lizhou District (利州) is a district in Guangyuan, Sichuan, China.

Lizhou or Li Prefecture may also refer to:

- Lizhou (利州), a former prefecture in roughly modern Tianlin County, Guangxi, China
- Lizhou (利州), a former prefecture in roughly modern Harqin Banner, Inner Mongolia, China
- Lizhou (黎州), a former prefecture in roughly modern Hanyuan County, Sichuan, China
- Lizhou (黎州), a former prefecture in roughly modern Xun County, Henan, China
- Lizhou (黎州), a former prefecture in roughly modern Jiangchuan County, Yunnan, China
- Lizhou (黎州), a former prefecture in modern Beijing, China
- Hebei Lizhou BOB Rural Commercial Bank (河北蠡州北银农商银行), a rural commercial bank, located in Li County, Baoding, Hebei

== See also ==
- Li County (disambiguation)
- Yeoju (Korean equivalent)
