= Se'ergu, Sichuan =

Se'ergu 色尔古镇
- Town
- Se'erguzhen
- Location in Sichuan
- Coordinates: 31°56′38″N 103°56′38″E
- Country: People's Republic of China
- Province: Sichuan
- Autonomous prefecture: Ngawa Tibetan and Qiang Autonomous Prefecture
- County: Heishui County

Area
  - Total: 52.32 km^{2} (20.20 sq mi)

Population (2010)
  - Total: 2,813
  - Density: 53.77/km^{2} (139.3/sq mi)
- Time zone: UTC+8 (China Standard)

Se'ergu (Mandarin: 色尔古镇) is a town in Heishui County, Ngawa Tibetan and Qiang Autonomous Prefecture, Sichuan, China. In 2010, Se'ergu had a total population of 2,813: 1,486 males and 1,327 females: 642 aged under 14, 1,981 aged between 15 and 65 and 190 aged over 65.
