= 1933 Baffin Bay earthquake =

Earthquake that struck Greenland and the Northwest Territories (now Nunavut), Canada

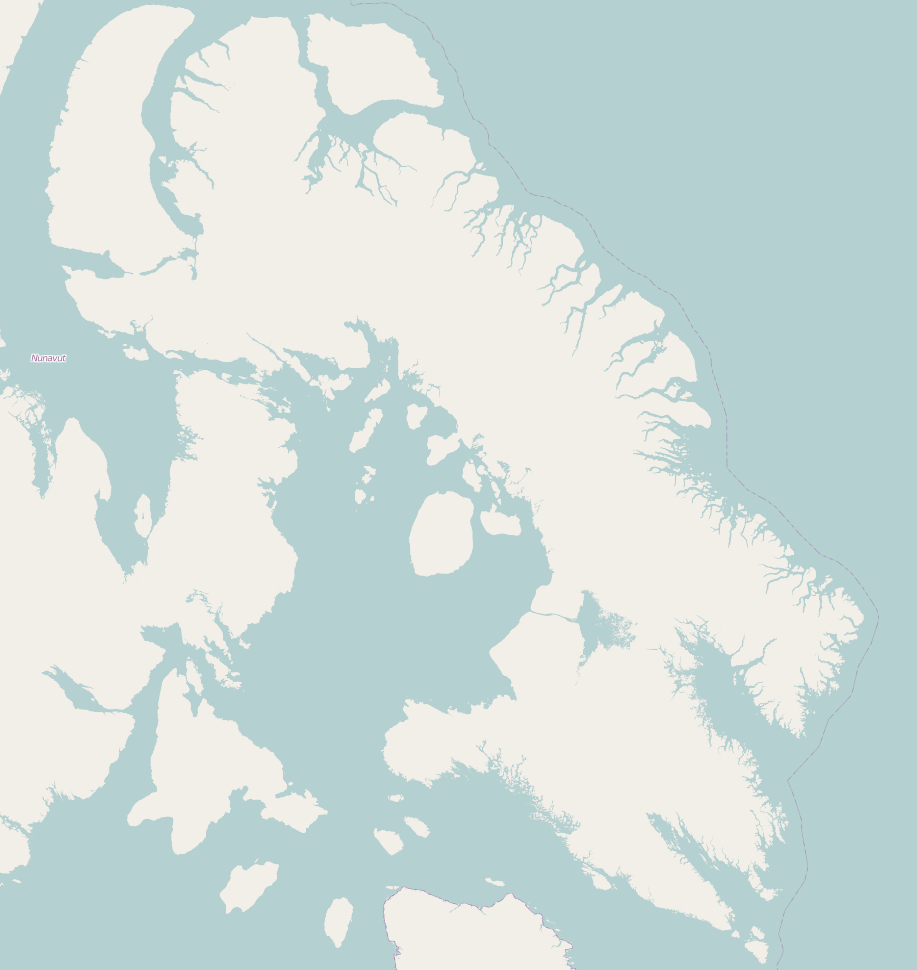
- Location within Canada Location within Baffin Island
- UTC time: 1933-11-20 23:21:35
- ISC event: 905919
- USGS-ANSS: ComCat
- Local date: November 20, 1933
- Local time: 18:21:35 Eastern Time Zone
- Magnitude: M_{w} 7.4, M_{s} 7.3, mb 7.2±0.3
- Depth: 10–15 km (6–9 mi)
- Epicenter: 73.07°N 70.01°W
- Type: Strike-slip and thrust
- Areas affected: Canada, Greenland
- Max. intensity: MMI IV (Light)

The 1933 Baffin Bay earthquake struck Greenland and the Northwest Territories (now Nunavut), Canada with a moment magnitude of 7.4 at 18:21:35 Eastern Time Zone on November 20, 1933. Depth is estimated at 10–65 km (6.2–40.4 mi) and the maximum felt intensity is estimated at IV (Light).

The main shock epicenter was located in Baffin Bay on the east coast of Baffin Island. Shaking was only felt at the small towns of Upernavik, Greenland and Clyde River, Nunavut. The event is the largest recorded earthquake to strike the passive margin of North America and is the largest north of the Arctic Circle. It is also one of the largest intraplate earthquakes of all time. No damage was reported because of its offshore location and the small population of the nearby communities.

== Tectonic setting ==
Canada is not typically associated with seismic activity, however, Canada does experience infrequent large earthquakes. At the location of the earthquake, there is an extinct spreading center which formed the Baffin Bay itself. That rift separated Baffin Bay from Greenland by up to 200 km (120 mi). As this region is not at the boundary of a plate, earthquakes occurring here are considered intraplate. As the spreading center created zones of weakness, this passive margin occasionally reactivates in a strike-slip manner, likely including a destructive event in the 1860s that took out an Inuit hunting party. Due to the seismic activity in the Baffin Bay area, seismic hazard maps have the area at level 4 out of 5 in the onshore area nearest to the seismicity, with the nearest inhabited area being in a level 3 area. Despite being primarily strike-slip, the seismic events in this region can pose a risk of tsunami.

== Earthquake ==
The M_{w} 7.4 earthquake struck offshore Baffin Island in the Baffin Bay at 18:21:35 Eastern Time Zone on November 20, 1933. It had a hypocentral depth of 10–15 km (6.2–9.3 mi), and a maximum felt intensity of IV (Light). The earthquake was not widely felt, with reports of shaking initially only coming from Upernavik, Greenland, some 330 km (210 mi) away. Records from the Hudson Bay Company recorded shaking felt at Clyde River, Nunavut, but these were only accessed years after the shock. There was no reported damage from the earthquake due to the epicenter location's remoteness and low population of nearby communities. This earthquake is one of the largest known intraplate earthquakes ever recorded, and is the largest both north of the Arctic Circle and along the North American passive margin.

=== Rupture complexity ===
The earthquake's rupture was complex, requiring multiple sub-events to fit recorded waveforms. The rupture scenario with the best fit had 3 distinct sub-events. Rupture nucleated along a strike-slip fault, which had the highest moment (~M_{w} 7.3) of any of the sub-events. 10.5 seconds after the earthquake begins, a thrusting sub-event begins (~M_{w} 6.9), with the final sub-event (~M_{w} 7.0), also with a thrust mechanism, starting 21.5 seconds after the initial nucleation.

== Aftershocks ==
In the years after the earthquake struck, there have been many aftershocks. The 4 largest struck within the next couple decades. There was a M_{GR} 6.5 earthquake a year after the mainshock, a couple earthquakes (M_{GR} 6.5 & M_{GR} 6.0) in the mid 1940s, and a final large (M_{GR} 6.4) aftershock in 1957. Seismic activity continues in the area, with multiple magnitude 5 earthquakes since.

== See also ==
- List of earthquakes in 1933
- List of earthquakes in Canada
