= List of earthquakes in 1933 =

Earthquakes in 1933
Approximate epicenters of the earthquakes in 1933
- 4.0–5.9 magnitude
- 6.0–6.9 magnitude
- 7.0–7.9 magnitude
- 8.0+ magnitude
- Strongest: Japan, off the east coast of Honshu, (Magnitude 8.4) March 2
- Deadliest: China, Sichuan Province (Magnitude 7.3) August 25 9,300 deaths
- Total fatalities: 13,368

Number by magnitude
- 9.0+: 0

This is a list of earthquakes in 1933. Only magnitude 6.0 or greater earthquakes appear on the list. Lower magnitude events are included if they have caused death, injury or damage. Events which occurred in remote areas will be excluded from the list as they wouldn't have generated significant media interest. All dates are listed according to UTC time. The biggest event of the year was the great Japan earthquake which struck early in March. A little over a week later saw southern California's deadliest earthquake to date, and a major shock in southern Sumatra left over 780 dead. China had the deadliest event in August with over 9,300 deaths.

== Overall ==
=== By death toll ===
Rank	Death toll	Magnitude	Location	MMI	Depth (km)	Date
1	9,300	7.3	China, Sichuan Province	X (Extreme)	15.0	August 25
2	3,022	8.4	Japan, off the east coast of Honshu	( )	15.0	March 2
3	788	7.6	Dutch East Indies, southern Sumatra	IX (Violent)	20.0	June 25
4	200	5.0	China, Sichuan Province	VI (Strong)	0.0	September 20
5	181+	6.4	Greece, off the coast of Kos	X (Extreme)	15.0	April 23
6	120	6.4	United States, off the coast of California	IX (Violent)	6.0	March 11
7	10	5.6	Italy, Abruzzo	IX (Violent)	15.0	September 26

- Note: At least 10 casualties

=== By magnitude ===
Rank	Magnitude	Death toll	Location	MMI	Depth (km)	Date
1	8.4	3,022	Japan, off the east coast of Honshu	( )	15.0	March 2
2	7.6	788	Dutch East Indies, southern Sumatra	IX (Violent)	20.0	June 25
3	7.5	0	United Kingdom, South Sandwich Islands	( )	35.0	August 28
4	7.4	0	Canada, Baffin Bay	( )	15.0	November 20
5	7.3	9,300	China, Sichuan Province	X (Extreme)	15.0	August 25
= 6	7.2	0	Chile, Tarapaca Region	( )	35.0	February 23
= 6	7.2	0	Japan, off the east coast of Honshu	( )	30.0	June 18
= 7	7.1	0	Southwest Indian Ridge	( )	10.0	January 21
= 7	7.1	0	Fiji	( )	600.0	September 6
= 8	7.0	0	New Hebrides	( )	135.0	January 1
= 8	7.0	0	Argentina, Jujuy Province	( )	205.0	October 25

- Note: At least 7.0 magnitude

== Notable events ==
=== January ===
January
- Strongest: 7.1 M_{w} Southwest Indian Ridge
- Total fatalities: 0

Number by magnitude
- 8.0–8.9: 0
- 7.0–7.9: 2
- 6.0–6.9: 8

Date	Country and location	M_{w}	Depth (km)	MMI	Notes	Casualties	
Date	Country and location	M_{w}	Depth (km)	MMI	Notes	Dead	Injured
1	New Hebrides	7.0	135.0				
4	United States, Kenai Peninsula, Alaska	6.4	20.0				
7	Japan, off the east coast of Honshu	6.6	15.0				
8	Japan, off the east coast of Honshu	6.0	35.0		Aftershock.		
9	Afghanistan, Badakhshan Province	6.5	230.0				
15	New Guinea, off the east coast	6.2	140.0				
18	Russian SFSR, Sea of Okhotsk	6.5	570.0				
21	Southwest Indian Ridge	7.1	10.0				
24	Mexico, Michoacan	6.2	90.0				
27	Samoa, south of	6.5	15.0				

=== February ===
February
- Strongest: 7.2 M_{w} Chile
- Total fatalities: 0

Number by magnitude
- 8.0–8.9: 0
- 7.0–7.9: 1
- 6.0–6.9: 2

Date	Country and location	M_{w}	Depth (km)	MMI	Notes	Casualties	
Date	Country and location	M_{w}	Depth (km)	MMI	Notes	Dead	Injured
13	China, Xinjiang Province	6.4	10.0				
19	British Solomon Islands	6.5	60.0				
23	Chile, Tarapaca Region	7.2	35.0				

=== March ===
March
- Strongest: 8.4 M_{w} Japan
- Deadliest: 8.4 M_{w} Japan; 3,022 deaths
- Total fatalities: 3,142

Number by magnitude
- 8.0–8.9: 1
- 7.0–7.9: 0
- 6.0–6.9: 12

Date	Country and location	M_{w}	Depth (km)	MMI	Notes	Casualties	
Date	Country and location	M_{w}	Depth (km)	MMI	Notes	Dead	Injured
2	Japan, off the east coast of Honshu	8.4	15.0		The 1933 Sanriku earthquake caused the destruction of many homes. A tsunami was triggered and caused 3,022 deaths. 6,000 homes were destroyed.	3,022	
2	Japan, off the east coast of Honshu	6.5	35.0		Aftershock.		
3	Philippines, Luzon	6.5	120.0				
3	Japan, off the east coast of Honshu	6.4	15.0		Aftershock.		
3	Japan, off the east coast of Honshu	6.3	15.0		Aftershock.		
3	Japan, off the east coast of Honshu	6.0	35.0		Aftershock.		
8	Japan, off the east coast of Honshu	6.0	35.0		Aftershock.		
11	United States, Newport Beach, California	6.4	6.0	IX	The 1933 Long Beach earthquake caused 120 deaths and extensive property damage. Costs were around $40 million (1933 rate). Many schools were damaged which led to changes in building codes.	120	
11	Japan, Bonin Islands	6.8	480.0				
17	Russian SFSR, Kamchatka Krai	6.6	35.0				
17	Philippines, southeast of Mindanao	6.7	35.0				
18	Japan, south of Honshu	6.5	170.0				
23	Mongolia, Bulgan Province	6.0	35.0				

=== April ===
April
- Strongest: 6.8 M_{w} United States
- Deadliest: 6.4 M_{w} Greece; 181+ deaths
- Total fatalities: 181+

Number by magnitude
- 8.0–8.9: 0
- 7.0–7.9: 0
- 6.0–6.9: 8

Date	Country and location	M_{w}	Depth (km)	MMI	Notes	Casualties	
Date	Country and location	M_{w}	Depth (km)	MMI	Notes	Dead	Injured
1	Japan, off the east coast of Honshu	6.0	35.0		Aftershock.		
9	Japan, off the east coast of Honshu	6.7	15.0		Aftershock.		
9	Mexico, off the coast of Jalisco	6.4	15.0				
16	Dutch East Indies, Papua (province)	6.2	35.0				
19	Taiwan, Hualien County	6.7	35.0				
23	Greece, Dodecanese Islands	6.3	15.0	X	The 1933 Kos earthquake killed at least 181 people, destroyed many homes on Kos and damaged buildings on nearby islands. Minor damage to buildings in Turkey.	181+	
23	Japan, off the east coast of Honshu	6.4	15.0		Aftershock.		
27	United States, southern Alaska	6.8	15.0				

=== May ===
May
- Strongest: 6.7 M_{w} Mexico
- Total fatalities: 0

Number by magnitude
- 8.0–8.9: 0
- 7.0–7.9: 0
- 6.0–6.9: 5

Date	Country and location	M_{w}	Depth (km)	MMI	Notes	Casualties	
Date	Country and location	M_{w}	Depth (km)	MMI	Notes	Dead	Injured
1	United States, Andreanof Islands, Alaska	6.5	0.0		Depth unknown.		
8	Mexico, Guerrero	6.7	30.0				
11	Greece, Central Macedonia	6.3	10.0				
21	Dutch East Indies, eastern Seram	6.2	120.0				
21	Dutch East Indies, Banda Sea	6.2	180.0				

=== June ===
June
- Strongest: 7.6 M_{w} Dutch East Indies
- Deadliest: 7.6 M_{w} Dutch East Indies; 788 deaths
- Total fatalities: 788

Number by magnitude
- 8.0–8.9: 0
- 7.0–7.9: 2
- 6.0–6.9: 12

Date	Country and location	M_{w}	Depth (km)	MMI	Notes	Casualties	
Date	Country and location	M_{w}	Depth (km)	MMI	Notes	Dead	Injured
2	Japan, southeast of Kyushu	6.2	35.0				
3	Japan, Ryukyu Islands	6.2	35.0				
4	New Guinea, off the east coast	6.0	120.0				
6	Philippines, southwest of Luzon	6.2	35.0				
7	China, Yunnan Province	6.2	35.0				
10	Iceland, southwest of	6.0	35.0				
11	Fiji	6.5	80.0				
13	Japan, off the east coast of Honshu	6.2	35.0		Foreshock.		
13	United States, southern Alaska	6.3	0.0		Depth unknown.		
18	Japan, off the east coast of Honshu	7.2	30.0				
19	United States, southern Alaska	6.0	0.0		Aftershock. Depth unknown.		
21	Dutch East Indies, off the west coast of northern Sumatra	6.5	80.0				
24	Dutch East Indies, southern Sumatra	7.6	20.0	IX	The 1933 Sumatra earthquake killed at least 788 people and caused extensive damage.	788	650
25	United States, western Nevada	6.1	0.0		Depth unknown.		

=== July ===
July
- Strongest: 6.9 M_{w} United States
- Total fatalities: 0

Number by magnitude
- 8.0–8.9: 0
- 7.0–7.9: 0
- 6.0–6.9: 12

Date	Country and location	M_{w}	Depth (km)	MMI	Notes	Casualties	
Date	Country and location	M_{w}	Depth (km)	MMI	Notes	Dead	Injured
9	Russian SFSR, east of the Kuril Islands	6.4	15.0				
9	Russian SFSR, east of the Kuril Islands	6.6	15.0				
10	Mexico, off the coast of Michoacan	6.4	15.0				
10	Dutch East Indies, Aru Islands	6.2	35.0				
13	Japan, off the west coast of Hokkaido	6.0	100.0				
13	Dutch East Indies, south of Java	6.2	70.0				
19	Turkey, Denizli Province	6.0	100.0				
22	United States, Fox Islands (Alaska)	6.9	30.0				
23	Peru, off the southern coast of	6.0	80.0				
24	Samoa	6.5	25.0				
30	New Hebrides, Espiritu Santo	6.5	160.0				
31	Peru, off the southern coast of	6.0	80.0				

=== August ===
August
- Strongest: 7.5 M_{w} United Kingdom
- Deadliest: 7.3 M_{w} China; 9,300 deaths
- Total fatalities: 9,300

Number by magnitude
- 8.0–8.9: 0
- 7.0–7.9: 2
- 6.0–6.9: 6

Date	Country and location	M_{w}	Depth (km)	MMI	Notes	Casualties	
Date	Country and location	M_{w}	Depth (km)	MMI	Notes	Dead	Injured
6	Peru, Junin Region	6.5	100.0				
9	Bolivia, La Paz Department (Bolivia)	6.2	170.0				
11	China, British Burma, border region	6.4	10.0				
20	Philippines, southeast of Catanduanes	6.3	20.0				
25	China, Sichuan Province	7.3	15.0	X	The 1933 Diexi earthquake caused major destruction. 9,300 people were killed and scores of homes were destroyed.	9,300	
25	Dutch East Indies, Sulawesi	6.5	720.0				
28	United Kingdom, South Sandwich Islands	7.5	35.0				
29	Brazil, Acre (state)	6.5	650.0				

=== September ===
September
- Strongest: 7.1 M_{w} Fiji
- Deadliest: 5.0 M_{w} China; 200 deaths
- Total fatalities: 210

Number by magnitude
- 8.0–8.9: 0
- 7.0–7.9: 1
- 6.0–6.9: 11
- 5.0–5.9: 1

Date	Country and location	M_{w}	Depth (km)	MMI	Notes	Casualties	
Date	Country and location	M_{w}	Depth (km)	MMI	Notes	Dead	Injured
2	Japan, Izu Islands	6.8	425.0				
6	Fiji	7.1	600.0				
7	Philippines, Mindanao	6.2	150.0				
9	China, Heilongjiang Province	6.2	590.0				
20	China, Sichuan Province	5.0	0.0	VI	200 people were killed in the moderate event. Landslides destroyed 30 homes. Depth unknown.	200	
20	Philippines, Mindoro	6.5	100.0				
21	Japan, off the west coast of Honshu	6.2	50.0				
21	Japan, off the east coast of Honshu	6.2	35.0				
24	United States, Andreanof Islands, Alaska	6.4	55.0				
25	Philippines, east of Mindanao	6.0	35.0				
25	China, Xinjiang Province	6.7	10.0				
26	Italy, Abruzzo	5.6	15.0	IX	10 people died and some damage was reported.	10	
27	New Guinea, north of New Britain	6.0	35.0				
30	Dutch East Indies, Papua (province)	6.2	35.0				

=== October ===
October
- Strongest: 7.0 M_{w} Argentina
- Total fatalities: 0

Number by magnitude
- 8.0–8.9: 0
- 7.0–7.9: 1
- 6.0–6.9: 10

Date	Country and location	M_{w}	Depth (km)	MMI	Notes	Casualties	
Date	Country and location	M_{w}	Depth (km)	MMI	Notes	Dead	Injured
1	Peru, Loreto Region	6.2	120.0				
2	Ecuador, off the coast of	6.7	15.0				
3	Ecuador, Santa Elena Province	6.2	35.0		Aftershock.		
3	Ecuador, Santa Elena Province	6.0	35.0		Aftershock.		
3	Japan, Niigata Prefecture, Honshu	6.0	35.0				
5	Iran, Semnan Province	6.0	35.0				
12	Chile, Antofagasta Region	6.2	100.0				
17	Dutch East Indies, east of Seram	6.5	130.0				
25	Argentina, Jujuy Province	7.0	205.0				
27	Dutch East Indies, Flores Sea	6.0	420.0				
30	New Hebrides, Malekula	6.0	35.0				

=== November ===
November
- Strongest: 7.4 M_{w} Canada
- Deadliest: 6.2 M_{w} Iran; 4 deaths
- Total fatalities: 4

Number by magnitude
- 8.0–8.9: 0
- 7.0–7.9: 1
- 6.0–6.9: 7

Date	Country and location	M_{w}	Depth (km)	MMI	Notes	Casualties	
Date	Country and location	M_{w}	Depth (km)	MMI	Notes	Dead	Injured
4	Venezuela, Tachira	6.0	35.0				
14	Argentina, San Juan Province, Argentina	6.5	110.0				
20	Canada, Baffin Bay	7.4	10.0		1933 Baffin Bay earthquake.		
21	Costa Rica, off the south coast	6.0	35.0				
22	New Guinea, south of New Britain	6.7	35.0				
23	Costa Rica, off the south coast	6.0	35.0				
28	Iran, Yazd Province	6.2	10.0		4 people were killed and major damage was caused.	4	
29	Costa Rica, off the south coast	6.0	35.0				

=== December ===
December
- Strongest: 6.8 M_{w} Russian SFSR
- Total fatalities: 0

Number by magnitude
- 8.0–8.9: 0
- 7.0–7.9: 0
- 6.0–6.9: 6

Date	Country and location	M_{w}	Depth (km)	MMI	Notes	Casualties	
Date	Country and location	M_{w}	Depth (km)	MMI	Notes	Dead	Injured
1	France, Loyalty Islands, New Caledonia	6.5	140.0				
4	Russian SFSR, Sea of Okhotsk	6.8	305.0				
12	New Guinea, eastern New Ireland (island)	6.4	15.0		Minor damage was caused.		
13	Mexico, off the coast of Colima	6.6	20.0				
14	Mexico, Michoacan	6.3	30.0				
21	Argentina, San Juan Province, Argentina	6.2	120.0				
