= Heishui County =

Heishui County 黑水县 • ཁྲོ་ཆུ་རྫོང་། • Vvlukvua Choqu
- County
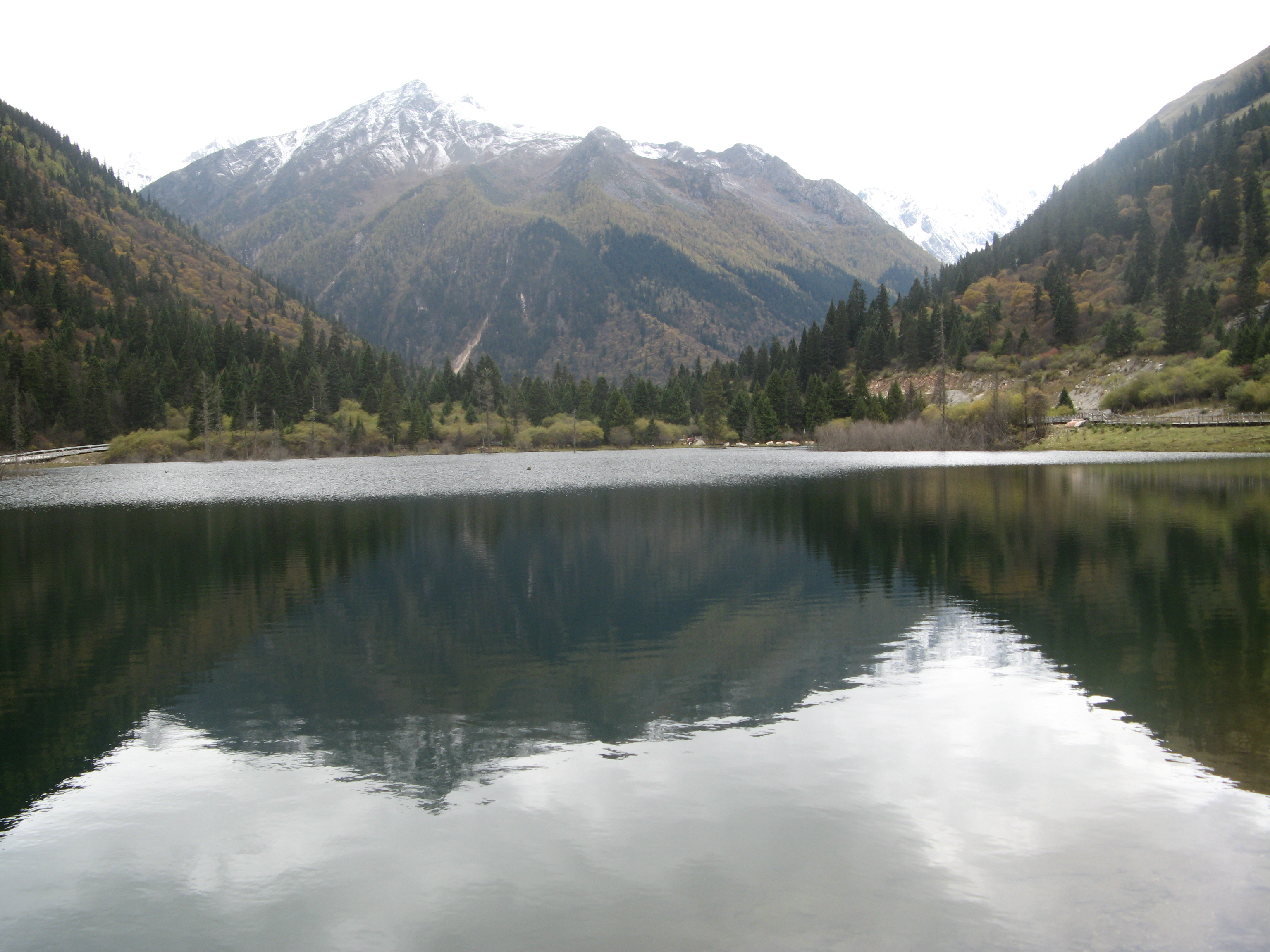

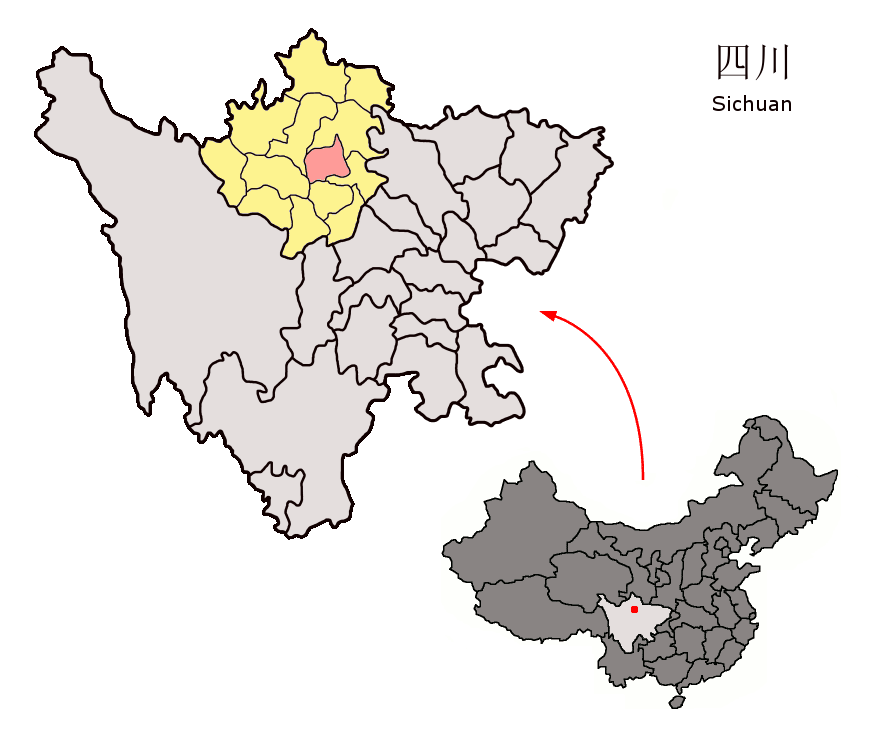
- Location of Heishui County (light red) in Aba (yellow) and Sichuan (light gray)

- Location of the seat in Sichuan Heishui (China)
- Coordinates: 32°14′07″N 103°03′20″E
- Country: China
- Province: Sichuan
- Autonomous prefecture: Ngawa
- County seat: Doka (Luhua)

Area
  - Total: 4,356 km^{2} (1,682 sq mi)
- Elevation: 3,544 m (11,627 ft)

Population (2020)
  - Total: 44,564
  - Density: 10.23/km^{2} (26.50/sq mi)
- Time zone: UTC+8 (China Standard)
- Website: www.heishui.gov.cn

Heishui County

Chinese name
- Simplified Chinese: 黑水县
- Traditional Chinese: 黑水縣
- Literal meaning: black water
Transcriptions
Standard Mandarin
- Hanyu Pinyin: Hēishuǐ Xiàn

Tibetan name
- Tibetan: ཁྲོ་ཆུ་རྫོང་།
Transcriptions
- Wylie: khro chu rdzong
- Tibetan Pinyin: Choqu Zong

Qiang name
- Qiang: Vvlukvua

Heishui County (Chinese: 黑水县; Tibetan: ཁྲོ་ཆུ་རྫོང་།; Qiang: Vvlukvua) is a county in the north of Sichuan Province, China. It is under the administration of the Ngawa Tibetan and Qiang Autonomous Prefecture. The county has an area of 1,682 square miles (4,356 km^{2}) and its average elevation is 11,627 feet (3,544 m). As of 2016, the county has a population of 61,744.

== Administrative divisions ==
Heishui County has jurisdiction over 8 towns and 7 townships:

Name	Simplified Chinese	Hanyu Pinyin	Tibetan	Wylie	Administrative division code
Towns
Doka Town (Luhua)	芦花镇	Lúhuā Zhèn	རྡོ་ཁ་གྲོང་རྡལ།	rdo kha grong rdal	513228100
Kalung Town (Luhua)	卡龙镇	Lúhuā Zhèn	མཁའ་ལུང་གྲོང་རྡལ།	mkhav lung grong rdal	513228101
Sêrgu Town (Ser'ergu)	色尔古镇	Sè'ěrgǔ Zhèn	གསེར་རྒུ་གྲོང་རྡལ།	gser rgu grong rdal	513228102
Kixiu Town (Xi'er)	西尔镇	Xī'ěr Zhèn	གིས་གཤིའུ་གྲོང་རྡལ།	gis gshivu grong rdal	513228103
Musu Town	木苏镇	Mùsū Zhèn	མུ་སུ་གྲོང་རྡལ།	mu su grong rdal	513228104
Sadoi Town (Shashiduo)	沙石多镇	Shāshíduō Zhèn	ས་སྟོད་གྲོང་རྡལ།	sa stod grong rdal	513228105
Jimulê Town (Zhimulin)	知木林镇	Zhīmùlín Zhèn	ཅི་མུ་ལེའི་གྲོང་རྡལ།	ci mu levi grong rdal	513228106
Jawu Town (Zhawo)	扎窝镇	Zhāwō Zhèn	ཅ་བུ་གྲོང་རྡལ།	ca bu grong rdal	513228107
Townships
Qibirliangzi Township (Waboliangzi)	瓦钵梁子乡	Wǎbōliángzǐ Xiāng	ཆི་པིར་ལིའང་ཙི་ཡུལ་ཚོ།	chi pir livang tsi yul tsho	513228204
Diru Township (Shidiaolou)	石碉楼乡	Shídiāolóu Xiāng	སྟི་རུ་ཡུལ་ཚོ།	sti ru yul tsho	513228206
Lonbag Township (Longba)	龙坝乡	Lóngbà Xiāng	གློ་འབག་ཡུལ་ཚོ།	glo vbag yul tsho	513228207
Zhido Township (Luoduo)	洛多乡	Luòduō Xiāng	འདྲི་ཏོ་ཡུལ་ཚོ།	vdri to yul tsho	513228208
Gaku Township (Weigu)	维古乡	Wéigǔ Xiāng	དགའ་གུ་ཡུལ་ཚོ།	dgav gu yul tsho	513228210
Qunag Township (Qinglang)	晴朗乡	Qínglǎng Xiāng	ཆུ་ནག་ཡུལ་ཚོ།	chu nag yul tsho	513228213
Cibir Township (Ciba)	慈坝乡	Cíbà Xiāng	ཚི་པིར་ཡུལ་ཚོ།	tshi pir yul tsho	513228214

== Climate ==
Climate data for Heishui, elevation 2,400 m (7,900 ft), (1991–2020 normals, extremes 1981–2010)
Month	Jan	Feb	Mar	Apr	May	Jun	Jul	Aug	Sep	Oct	Nov	Dec	Year
Record high °C (°F)	21.1 (70.0)	25.3 (77.5)	28.6 (83.5)	33.0 (91.4)	31.8 (89.2)	31.5 (88.7)	33.4 (92.1)	32.8 (91.0)	31.2 (88.2)	26.8 (80.2)	23.7 (74.7)	18.7 (65.7)	33.4 (92.1)
Mean daily maximum °C (°F)	8.0 (46.4)	11.7 (53.1)	15.5 (59.9)	19.4 (66.9)	21.6 (70.9)	23.0 (73.4)	25.2 (77.4)	25.4 (77.7)	21.9 (71.4)	17.3 (63.1)	13.6 (56.5)	9.2 (48.6)	17.7 (63.8)
Daily mean °C (°F)	−0.5 (31.1)	2.8 (37.0)	6.6 (43.9)	10.5 (50.9)	13.1 (55.6)	15.5 (59.9)	17.5 (63.5)	17.4 (63.3)	14.4 (57.9)	9.8 (49.6)	4.8 (40.6)	0.4 (32.7)	9.4 (48.8)
Mean daily minimum °C (°F)	−6.1 (21.0)	−3.3 (26.1)	0.4 (32.7)	4.1 (39.4)	7.5 (45.5)	10.9 (51.6)	12.6 (54.7)	12.4 (54.3)	10.1 (50.2)	5.5 (41.9)	−0.5 (31.1)	−5.0 (23.0)	4.1 (39.3)
Record low °C (°F)	−13.9 (7.0)	−11.7 (10.9)	−11.0 (12.2)	−2.6 (27.3)	−0.4 (31.3)	3.8 (38.8)	4.7 (40.5)	3.4 (38.1)	0.6 (33.1)	−4.3 (24.3)	−7.8 (18.0)	−12.5 (9.5)	−13.9 (7.0)
Average precipitation mm (inches)	6.0 (0.24)	10.0 (0.39)	35.2 (1.39)	68.6 (2.70)	134.9 (5.31)	155.0 (6.10)	116.7 (4.59)	91.6 (3.61)	114.5 (4.51)	83.9 (3.30)	17.3 (0.68)	4.4 (0.17)	838.1 (32.99)
Average precipitation days (≥ 0.1 mm)	5.1	6.7	12.4	16.2	21.6	22.8	18.3	16.3	18.8	18.2	6.7	3.2	166.3
Average snowy days	8.6	9.7	7.3	1.5	0	0	0	0	0	0.2	2.9	5.2	35.4
Average relative humidity (%)	52	51	55	58	68	75	75	74	76	74	62	55	65
Mean monthly sunshine hours	168.4	151.4	158.7	167.4	168.5	141.2	161.5	161.8	135.7	140.1	158.5	171.1	1,884.3
Percentage possible sunshine	53	48	42	43	39	33	37	40	37	40	51	55	43
Source: China Meteorological Administration
