= Diexi, Mao County =

Town in Mao County, Ngawa Prefecture, Sichuan Province, China

Diexi
- Town

Chinese transcription(s)
  - Characters: 叠溪
  - Pinyin: Diéxī
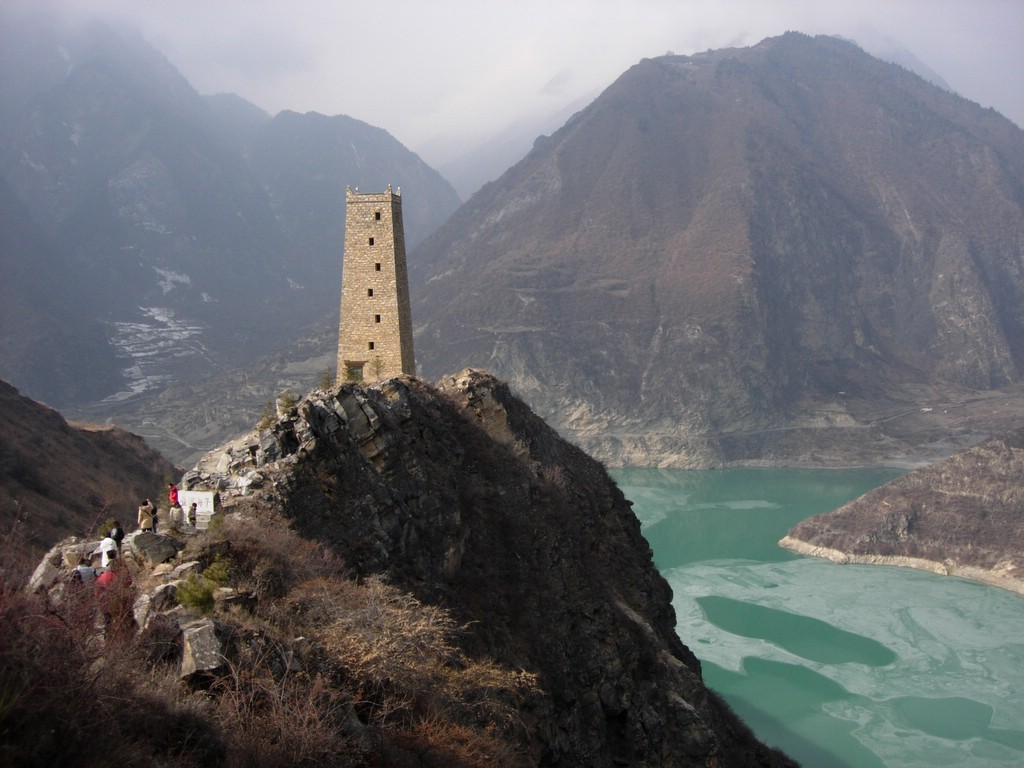
- Diexi

- Location in China
- Coordinates: 32°2′37″N 103°40′45″E
- Country: China
- Province: Sichuan
- Prefecture: Ngawa
- County: Mao County

Population (2000)
  - Total: 2,697
- Time zone: UTC+08:00 (China Standard)

Diexi (Chinese: 叠溪镇; pinyin: Diéxī zhèn; Tibetan: ཏེ་ཞི་གྲོང་རྡལ།, Wylie: te zhi grong rdal) is a town in Mao County, Ngawa Prefecture, Sichuan, China. As of 2000, it has a population of 2,697.

The old town of Diexi was destroyed in the 1933 Diexi earthquake and sank into Diexi Lake. On 24 June 2017, a landslide occurred in Xinmo Village (新磨村), Diexi.
