= Li County =

Li County or Lixian may refer to the following counties of the People's Republic of China :

- Lixian, Beijing (礼贤), in Daxing District, Beijing
- Li County, Gansu (礼县), county of Longnan City
- Li County, Hebei (蠡县), alias Lizhou/ Lichow, county of Baoding City, also seat of the Apostolic prefecture of Lixian
- Li County, Hunan (澧县), county of Changde City
- Li County, Sichuan (理县), county of Ngawa Tibetan and Qiang Autonomous Prefecture

== See also ==
- Lizhou (disambiguation), sometimes translated as "Li County"
