= 1933 Kos earthquake =

Earthquake affecting Greece

- Location within Greece
- UTC time: 1933-04-23 05:57:34
- ISC event: 905533
- USGS-ANSS: ComCat
- Local date: 23 April 1933
- Local time
- Magnitude: 6.4 M_{w}
- Depth: 15 km (9.3 mi)
- Epicenter: 36.759°N 27.299°E
- Areas affected: Greece, Turkey
- Max. intensity: MMI X (Extreme)
- Tsunami: None
- Casualties: 181+ fatalities

The 1933 Kos earthquake struck the Aegean Sea region on 23 April. It measured M_{w} 6.4 and had an epicenter offshore, near Kos, Greece. The earthquake collapsed many buildings on Kos, Nisyros and other islands. At least 181 people were killed with a possible death toll reaching several hundred.

== Tectonic setting ==
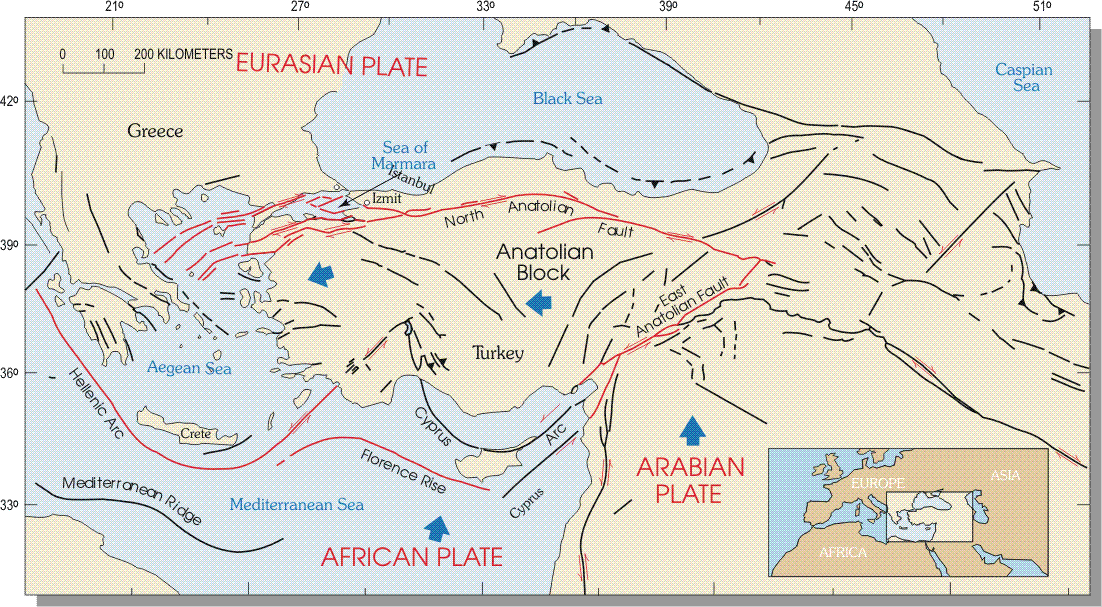
Geologic map of Anatolia and the Aegean region

The eastern Mediterranean Sea is a region of dynamic plate interactions involving the Eurasian and Aftican plates—dominated by the North Anatolian Fault and Hellenic subduction zone. The Aegean Sea is a seismically active and complex area in the eastern Mediterranean Sea that experiences frequent large earthquakes and tsunamis. The Aegean Sea plate formed between the divergent boundary in Greece, separating it from the Eurasian plate; and the subduction zone in the south separating it from the African plate. The east Aegean Sea is a region of extensional tectonics; around Kos, this tectonic setting formed the Kos and Gökova grabens, Quaternary submarine structures trending northeast–southwest and east–west, respectively. Earthquakes in the area are associated with normal faults that accommodates extension. Earthquakes in 1493, 1869 and 2017 caused severe damage and casualties.

== Earthquake ==
Prior to 1933, Kos was damaged by an intermediate-depth (115 km (71 mi)) M_{s} 7.4 earthquake. The April 1933 earthquake had magnitudes between 6.43 and 6.70; the International Seismological Centre cataloged it at M_{w} 6.4. The Modified Mercalli intensity on Kos ranged from VIII (Severe) to X (Extreme). Intensity IX–X (Violent–Extreme) was observed at Antimachia, Kardamaina and Kos. On Nissyros, the seismic intensity was VI–VII (Strong–Very strong). On Rhodes, the earthquake was felt V–VI (Moderate–Strong).

== Impact ==
In Kos historic city center, 90 percent of homes were demolished and only some government buildings were intact. Only 50 percent of homes were decimated in the new city. The Church of Agios Nikolaos was badly damaged and has to be torn down. At Pyli, a village west of the city, there was heavy damage. Almost all homes in Antimakheia were destroyed, and the village of Kardamena was near completely ruined. On Nissyros, the villages of Emporio, Pali, Mandraki and Nikia were damaged. Slight damage also occurred at Bodrum, Turkey.

The death toll ranged from 181 to several hundreds. Various press reports estimated 200–300 deaths on Kos. Only 122 victims were named. In Kos city, the death toll was reexamined to 178. Three more deaths occurred at Pyli. The number of injured was 600 to several thousand. Various press reports also stated between 20 and 100 deaths or no deaths on Nissyros.

== Tsunami ==
The island population and mass media continues to suppose a 2–3 m (6 ft 7 in – 9 ft 10 in) tsunami struck the island but no reports exist. A newspaper reported ebb tide at Kos port for several tens of meters although it is unclear when did it occur. No coastal uplift associated with the earthquake was documented. Reports of waves likely were due to strong wind rather a tsunami associated with the earthquake.

== See also ==
- List of earthquakes in 1933
- List of earthquakes in Greece
