= 1933 Diexi earthquake =

Earthquake centered in Sichuan Province, China

- Location within China
- UTC time: 1933-08-25 07:50:32
- ISC event: 905779
- USGS-ANSS: ComCat
- Local date: August 25, 1933
- Local time: 15:50:32
- Magnitude: 7.3 M_{w}
- Depth: 15 km (9 mi)
- Epicenter: 32.01°N 103.68°E (Diexi, Mao County, Sichuan)
- Areas affected: Republic of China
- Total damage: Extreme
- Max. intensity: MMI X (Extreme)
- Casualties: 6,865–9,300 dead 1,925 injured

The 1933 Diexi earthquake occurred in Diexi, Mao County, Sichuan, Republic of China on August 25, with a moment magnitude of 7.3 and a maximum Mercalli intensity of X (Extreme). With an estimated 6,865–9,300 killed, making it the deadliest earthquake in 1933.

This earthquake destroyed the town of Diexi and surrounding villages, and induced numerous landslides. The old town of Diexi was submerged in the landslide dam-created Diexi Lake.

== See also ==
- 2008 Sichuan earthquake
- List of earthquakes in 1933
- List of earthquakes in China
- List of earthquakes in Sichuan
