= Diexi Lake =

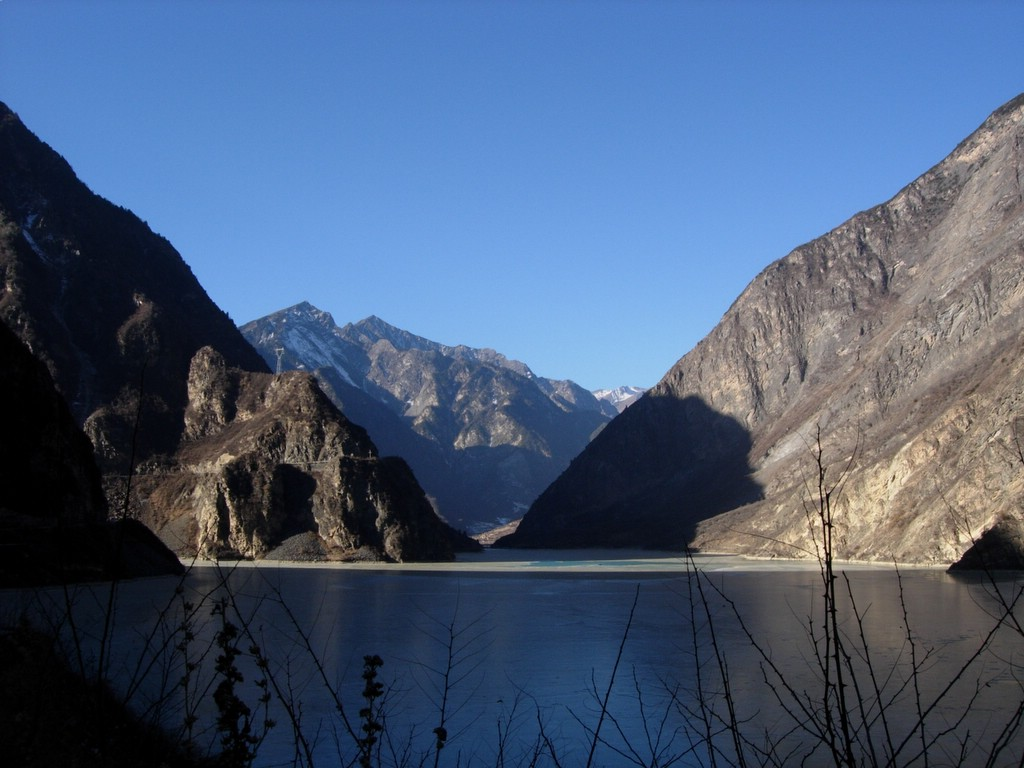

- Location within Sichuan
- Location: Diexi, Mao County, Sichuan
- Coordinates: 32°2′46.93″N 103°40′27.68″E
- Type: Landslide dam-created lake
- Primary inflows: Min River
- Primary outflows: Min River
- Basin countries: China
- Surface area: 3.5 km^{2} (1.4 sq mi)

Diexi Lake (Chinese: 叠溪海子; pinyin: Diéxī Hǎizi) is a lake in Diexi, Mao County, Sichuan, China.

Diexi Lake is a landslide dam-created lake formed in the 1933 Diexi earthquake and covers 3.5 square kilometers. The old town of Diexi sank into this lake. The remnants of the town's watch towers, a temple, stone lions and cliff murals are still visible today.
