= 2017 Jiuzhaigou earthquake =

7.0 Ms earthquake in Sichuan, China

2017 Jiuzhaigou earthquake 2017年九寨沟地震
- Location within Sichuan Location within China
- UTC time: 2017-08-08 13:19:49
- ISC event: 610873866
- USGS-ANSS: ComCat
- Local date: 8 August 2017
- Local time: 21:19:49 CST (UTC+8) (USGS)
- Duration: 15 seconds
- Magnitude: M_{s} 7.0 (CENC) M_{w} 6.5 (USGS)
- Depth: about 20 km (12 mi) (CENC) 9.0 km (5.6 mi) (USGS)
- Epicenter: 33.193°N 103.855°E; Zhangzha Town, Jiuzhaigou County, Ngawa Prefecture, Sichuan Province, China
- Areas affected: Sichuan Province, Gansu Province and Shaanxi Province
- Total damage: $500 million USD
- Max. intensity: CSIS IX
- Aftershocks: 1,741 (including 30 major aftershocks)
- Casualties: 29 dead, 543 injured and 1 missing

The 2017 Jiuzhaigou earthquake occurred on 8 August 2017, in Zhangzha Town, Jiuzhaigou County, Ngawa Prefecture, Sichuan Province, China. The earthquake was registered at M_{s} 7.0 and killed 29 people in the mountainous region of northern Sichuan.

== Earthquake ==
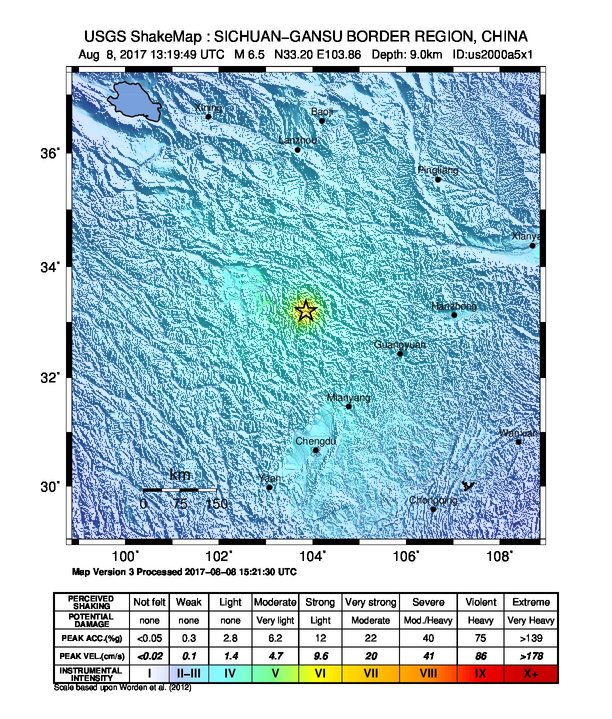
The distribution of the seismic intensity of this earthquake, where the epicentre is labelled with a star (USGS)

The earthquake struck at 21:19:46 China Standard Time (CST, UTC+8) on 8 August 2017 in Zhangzha Town in Jiuzhaigou County (33.20°N 103.82°E) with magnitude 7.0. (Note: The result from United States Geological Survey was M_{w} 6.5, with depth 9.0 kilometres) (Note: China Earthquake Networks Center automatically reported 6.5 at first, and then formally reported 7.0.) Cities as far away as Lanzhou, Chengdu and Xi'an felt the quake. The epicenter was 39 kilometres from the county seat of Jiuzhaigou County, 66 kilometres from Songpan County, 83 kilometres from Zhouqu County, 90 kilometres from Zoigê County, 105 kilometres from Longnan City, and 285 kilometres from Chengdu City.

== Setting ==
Northern Sichuan lies in an area with high tectonic activity. In this region, the Tibetan Plateau abuts against the Yangtze plate with immense pressure forming faults along the edges. Jiuzhaigou County is located in the Min Mountains, a range that was formed at the intersection of these faults. The devastating 1879 Gansu earthquake had its epicenter approximately 65 km (40 mi) to the east of where the 2017 Jiuzhaigou earthquake occurred. The mountainous areas to the south of Jiuzhaigou County were the epicenter of the 2008 Sichuan earthquake that resulted in tens of thousands of fatalities.

The Jiuzhaigou earthquake did not correlate with any of the known active faults. Field investigation and remote sensing of the surface effects of the earthquake (surface rupture, landslides) permitted the identification of a previously unknown active fault segment.

== Impacts ==
According an isoseismal map produced by the China Earthquake Administration, the seismic intensity could be higher than level IX, and the earthquake epicentre in Zhangzha County could reach level VIII.

The earthquake triggered at least 1,883 landslides, most of which were shallow rock slides, debris slides and rock falls that occurred close to the road network.

After the earthquake, the entire Jiuzhaigou County completely suffered a power failure. The eyewitnesses found that some buildings had fallen off in Jiuzhaigou Valley Scenic and Historic Interest Area. The staff of the Jiuzhaigou Valley Scenic and Historic Interest Area told the correspondent from Xinhua News Agency that in the fourth ditch of the Jiuzhaigou Valley Scenic and Historic Interest Area a house had collapsed and cracked, and the locals were stepping up to evacuate people.

== Rescue ==
The China Earthquake Administration put up a Level I reaction, changing to Level II afterwards, and sent troops to the earthquake area for rescue. At 21:26 CST (UTC+8), Health and Family Planning Commission of Sichuan Province started an emergency plan, and the medical rescue team was going to head to the earthquake area within one hour. The Red Cross Society of China, Sichuan Branch was on emergency standby, preparing for rescue. Early the following day, China's State Council Earthquake relief headquarters established national level II earthquake emergency response.

At 06:20 CST on 9 August, a Shuajingsi Town (刷经寺镇) militia vehicle collided with a Sichuan F (Deyang) coach in Hongyuan County, Ngawa Prefecture. Three people from the coach were injured.

By 9 August 2017, there were 40 people critically injured, seven of whom were transferred to other hospitals, four to West China Hospital of Sichuan University, and the rest to Jiuzhaigou County Hospital and Zhongzang Hospital.

== Casualties ==
The Emergency Management Office of the Ngawa Prefecture, Sichuan Province announced on 13:10 CST on 9 August, the 7.0-magnitude earthquake in Zhangzha Town in Jiuzhaigou County killed 19 people and injured 247 people, including 40 people critically injured. The following day, the death toll rose to 20 with over 400 injured. Deaths and injuries mainly occurred in Zhangzha Town in Jiuzhaigou County.

| CST date and time | Fatalities | Injuries | | | Sources | References |
| CST date and time | Fatalities | Critical injuries | Minor injuries | Total injuries | Sources | References |
|---|---|---|---|---|---|---|
| 2017-08-08 21:19:46 | (main tremor occurred) | | | | China Earthquake Networks Center (中国地震台网) | |
| 2017-08-08 23:39 | 1 | | 4 | 4 | Chengdu Tourism Administration (成都市旅游局) | |
| 2017-08-08 23:58 | 5 | | | 63 | Emergency Management Office of the Jiuzhaigou County (九寨沟县应急办) | |
| 2017-08-09 02:08 | 5 | | | 88 | China Central Television (中国中央电视台) | |
| 2017-08-09 04:00 | 9 | 32 | 103 | 135 | Information Office of Ngawa Prefecture Government (阿坝州政府新闻办) | |
| 2017-08-09 05:00 | 9 | | | 164 | Emergency Management Office of Ngawa Prefecture Government (阿坝州人民政府应急管理办公室) | |
| 2017-08-09 08:10 | 12 | | | | Ngawa Weibo (阿坝微博) | |
| 2017-08-09 08:58 | 12 | 28 | 147 | 175 | People's Daily (人民日报) | |
| 2017-08-09 09:30 | 13 | | | 175 | Information Office of Sichuan Province Government (四川省政府新闻办) | |
| 2017-08-09 13:10 | 19 | 40 | 207 | 247 | Emergency Management Office of Ngawa Prefecture Government (阿坝州人民政府应急管理办公室) | |
| 2017-08-10 12:00 | 20 | 18 | 413 | 431 | Emergency Management Office of the Jiuzhaigou County (九寨沟县应急办) | |
| 2017-08-11 19:00 | 23 | 45 | 448 | 493 | Emergency Management Office of Ngawa Prefecture Government (阿坝州人民政府应急管理办公室) | |
*All the times are reporting times, so the reported casualties might possibly be different from the actual casualties.

== Aftershocks ==
Aftershocks of 2017 Jiuzhaigou earthquake

As of 10 August 2017 10:00 CST (UTC+8), 1,741 aftershocks had occurred, including 30 major ones. Some experts predicted that the aftershocks might reach a magnitude of six after several days. The major aftershocks reported by China Earthquake Networks Center are listed below:

List of aftershocks
| # | CST date and time | Epicentre | | Depth | magnitude | Sources |
| # | CST date and time | Coordinate | Place | Depth | magnitude | Sources |
|---|---|---|---|---|---|---|
| Main | 2017-08-08 21:19:46 | 33.20°N 103.82°E | Jiuzhaigou County, Ngawa Prefecture, Sichuan Province, China | 20 kilometres | 7.0 | |
| 1 | 2017-08-08 21:28:55 | 33.24°N 103.78°E | Jiuzhaigou County, Ngawa Prefecture, Sichuan Province, China | 5 kilometres | 3.2 | |
| 2 | 2017-08-08 21:41:34 | 33.18°N 103.85°E | Jiuzhaigou County, Ngawa Prefecture, Sichuan Province, China | 9 kilometres | 3.3 | |
| 3 | 2017-08-08 23:04:56 | 33.24°N 103.79°E | Jiuzhaigou County, Ngawa Prefecture, Sichuan Province, China | 5 kilometres | 3.2 | |
| 4 | 2017-08-08 23:49:18 | 33.28°N 103.78°E | Jiuzhaigou County, Ngawa Prefecture, Sichuan Province, China | 9 kilometres | 3.0 | |
| 5 | 2017-08-08 23:51:12 | 33.11°N 103.88°E | Jiuzhaigou County, Ngawa Prefecture, Sichuan Province, China | 10 kilometres | 3.1 | |
| 6 | 2017-08-09 00:35:17 | 33.13°N 103.85°E | Jiuzhaigou County, Ngawa Prefecture, Sichuan Province, China | 20 kilometres | 3.2 | |
| 7 | 2017-08-09 03:59:09 | 33.29°N 103.79°E | Jiuzhaigou County, Ngawa Prefecture, Sichuan Province, China | 10 kilometres | 3.0 | |
| 8 | 2017-08-09 05:16:02 | 33.30°N 103.76°E | Jiuzhaigou County, Ngawa Prefecture, Sichuan Province, China | 10 kilometres | 3.6 | |
| 9 | 2017-08-09 05:37:14 | 33.12°N 103.87°E | Jiuzhaigou County, Ngawa Prefecture, Sichuan Province, China | 17 kilometres | 3.6 | |
| 10 | 2017-08-09 05:41:09 | 33.14°N 103.83°E | Jiuzhaigou County, Ngawa Prefecture, Sichuan Province, China | 10 kilometres | 3.3 | |
| 11 | 2017-08-09 06:24:49 | 33.14°N 103.85°E | Jiuzhaigou County, Ngawa Prefecture, Sichuan Province, China | 18 kilometres | 3.0 | |
| 12 | 2017-08-09 06:49:03 | 33.11°N 103.88°E | Jiuzhaigou County, Ngawa Prefecture, Sichuan Province, China | 18 kilometres | 3.2 | |
| 13 | 2017-08-09 06:49:31 | 33.31°N 103.77°E | Jiuzhaigou County, Ngawa Prefecture, Sichuan Province, China | 13 kilometres | 3.3 | |
| 14 | 2017-08-09 08:10:09 | 33.12°N 103.87°E | Jiuzhaigou County, Ngawa Prefecture, Sichuan Province, China | 23 kilometres | 3.7 | |
| 15 | 2017-08-09 08:29:04 | 33.28°N 103.80°E | Jiuzhaigou County, Ngawa Prefecture, Sichuan Province, China | 13 kilometres | 3.9 | |
| 16 | 2017-08-09 09:22:14 | 33.16°N 103.85°E | Jiuzhaigou County, Ngawa Prefecture, Sichuan Province, China | 19 kilometres | 3.8 | |
| 17 | 2017-08-09 09:32:47 | 33.28°N 103.75°E | Jiuzhaigou County, Ngawa Prefecture, Sichuan Province, China | 19 kilometres | 3.7 | |
| 18 | 2017-08-09 10:17:02 | 33.16°N 103.86°E | Jiuzhaigou County, Ngawa Prefecture, Sichuan Province, China | 26 kilometres | 4.8 | |
| 19 | 2017-08-09 14:41:00 | 32.23°N 102.63°E | Heishui County, Ngawa Prefecture, Sichuan Province, China | 18 kilometres | 2.9 | |
| 20 | 2017-08-09 20:03:03 | 33.16°N 103.87°E | Jiuzhaigou County, Ngawa Prefecture, Sichuan Province, China | 24 kilometres | 3.1 | |
| 21 | 2017-08-10 02:30:50 | 33.15°N 103.86°E | Jiuzhaigou County, Ngawa Prefecture, Sichuan Province, China | 26 kilometres | 3.1 | |
| 22 | 2017-08-10 03:02:13 | 33.22°N 103.79°E | Jiuzhaigou County, Ngawa Prefecture, Sichuan Province, China | 19 kilometres | 3.7 | |
| 23 | 2017-08-10 03:06:09 | 33.14°N 103.86°E | Jiuzhaigou County, Ngawa Prefecture, Sichuan Province, China | 24 kilometres | 3.0 | |
| 24 | 2017-08-10 05:05:54 | 33.16°N 103.85°E | Jiuzhaigou County, Ngawa Prefecture, Sichuan Province, China | 26 kilometres | 4.3 | |
| 25 | 2017-08-10 09:54:02 | 33.16°N 103.85°E | Jiuzhaigou County, Ngawa Prefecture, Sichuan Province, China | 27 kilometres | 3.2 | |
| 26 | 2017-08-10 15:30:09 | 33.14°N 103.86°E | Jiuzhaigou County, Ngawa Prefecture, Sichuan Province, China | 26 kilometres | 2.8 | |
| 27 | 2017-08-10 17:38:31 | 33.26°N 103.76°E | Jiuzhaigou County, Ngawa Prefecture, Sichuan Province, China | 19 kilometres | 3.0 | |
| 28 | 2017-08-10 17:48:34 | 33.22°N 103.85°E | Jiuzhaigou County, Ngawa Prefecture, Sichuan Province, China | 26 kilometres | 4.1 | |
| 29 | 2017-08-11 08:05:09 | 33.17°N 103.87°E | Jiuzhaigou County, Ngawa Prefecture, Sichuan Province, China | 25 kilometres | 3.0 | |
| 30 | 2017-08-11 19:26:21 | 33.10°N 103.87°E | Jiuzhaigou County, Ngawa Prefecture, Sichuan Province, China | 26 kilometres | 3.4 | |

== See also ==
- List of earthquakes in 2017
- List of earthquakes in China
- List of earthquakes in Sichuan
- 2008 Sichuan earthquake
- 2010 Yushu earthquake
- 2013 Dingxi earthquakes
- 2014 Ludian earthquake
