= Hadapu =

Coordinates: 34°13′56″N 104°13′26″E

Hadapu 哈达铺镇
- Town
- Interactive map of Hadapu

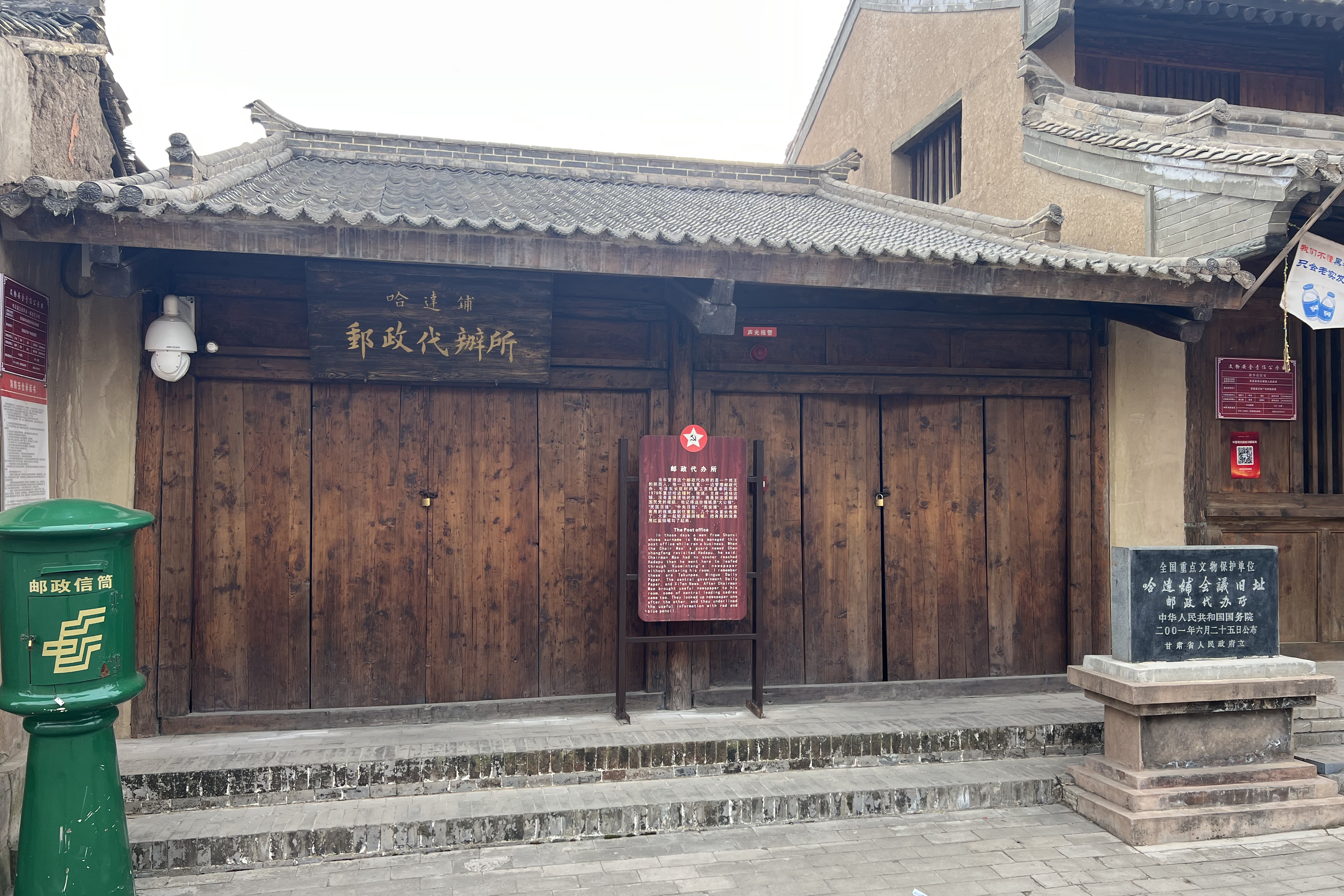
Hadapu Post Office

Hadapu is a town of Tanchang County, Gansu, China.

It was formerly known as Hatachuan (哈塔川) and Hadachuan (哈达川). In 1933 Hadapu township was established.

The town is located in a strategic position on the foot of the Min Mountains on the route between Sichuan and Northwestern China. In 1935, during the Chinese Civil War, several waves of the Long March stayed in the town and reorganized before crossing north.

Hadapu is a major production area of traditional Chinese medicine from plants including Rhubarb, Codonopsis, Astragalus, Notopterygium and Angelica.

Hadapu station is a major station on the Lanzhou–Chongqing railway.

== See also ==
- Lazikou Pass
