= Jiuzhaigou (disambiguation) =

Jiuzhaigou, or Jiuzhaigou Valley Scenic and Historic Interest Area, is a nature reserve and national park in northwestern Sichuan, China.

Jiuzhaigou may also refer to:

- Jiuzhaigou County, containing the nature reserve
- Jiuzhaigou Town, former name of Zhangzha Town, a town in Jiuzhaigou County, Sichuan, China
- Jiuzhai Huanglong Airport, occasionally Jiuzhaigou [Huanglong] Airport
