= Nuorilang Waterfall =

Waterfall in Jiuzhaigou, China

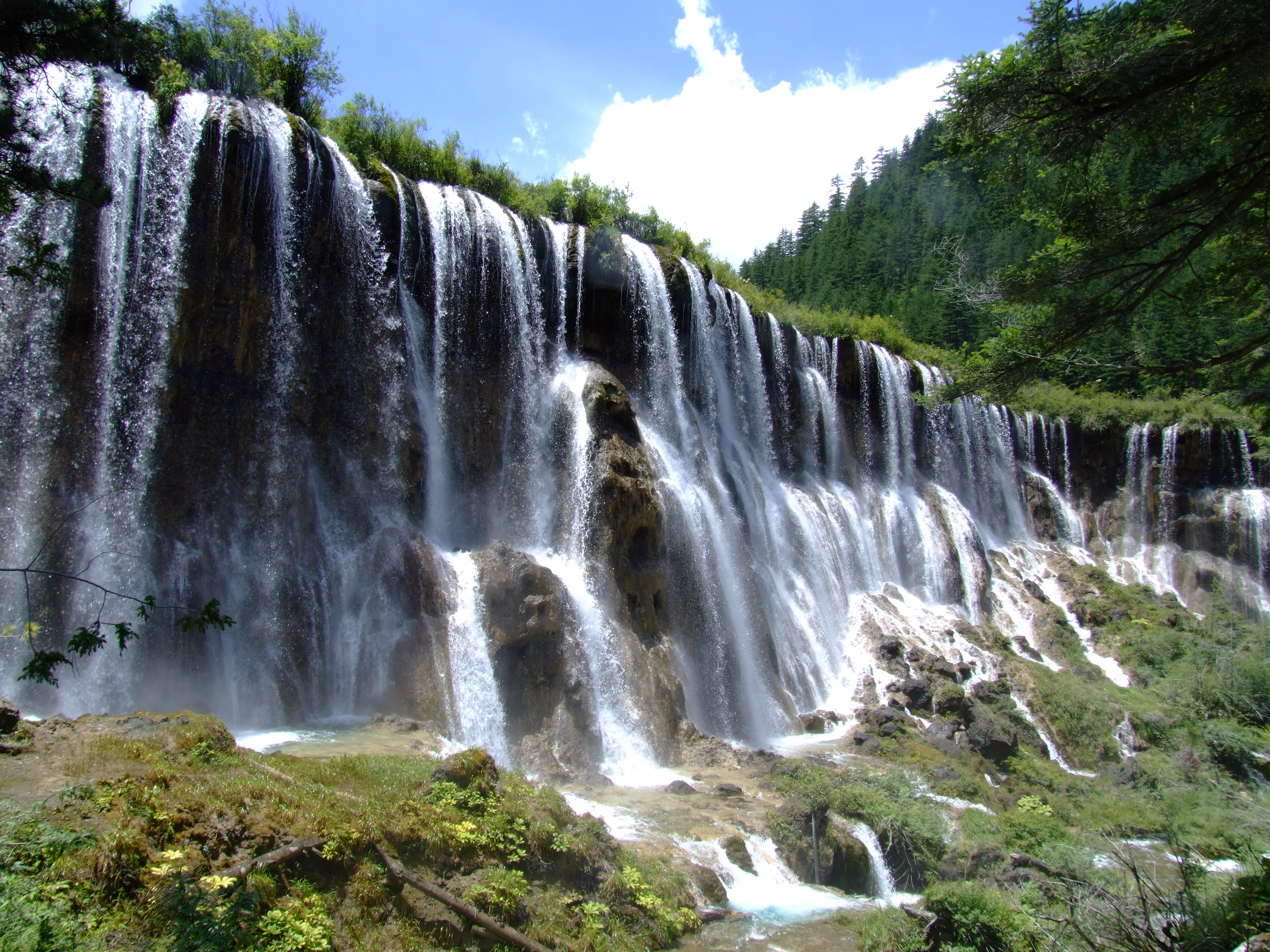
- Location: Sichuan, China
- Type: Calcified waterfall
- Total height: 24.5 m (80 ft)

Nuorilang Waterfall (simplified Chinese: 诺日朗瀑布; traditional Chinese: 諾日朗瀑布; pinyin: Nuòrìlǎng pùbù), also spelled as Norilang Waterfall, is a waterfall located in the middle of Jiuzhaigou, Sichuan Province, 2365 meters in elevation, 320 meters wide and 24.5 meters high. It is one of the large calcified waterfalls in China.

In the noun "Nuorilang Waterfall", "Nuorilang" is the transliteration of the Tibetan, which means "majestic and sublime or male god" in Tibetan.

== Hydrological changes ==
After the 2017 Jiuzhaigou earthquake, Nuorilang Waterfall was severely damaged, and it was only left with a trickle of water. As of August 2019, Nuorilang Waterfall has recovered well. At present, it is still the widest waterfall in China.
