= Chen Poxi =

Chinese singer and musician

Chen Poxi (14th-century) was a Chinese tanchang-singer and musician.

She was famous in contemporary China for her ability to perform in all the languages of the Chinese minorities during her tours, while accompanying herself by playing music instruments, and was praised by critics for having a "Golden" voice which "reigned over the clouds." She was described as intelligent, wise and entertaining and enjoyed great popularity.
