= Huanglong Scenic and Historic Interest Area =

UNESCO World Heritage Site
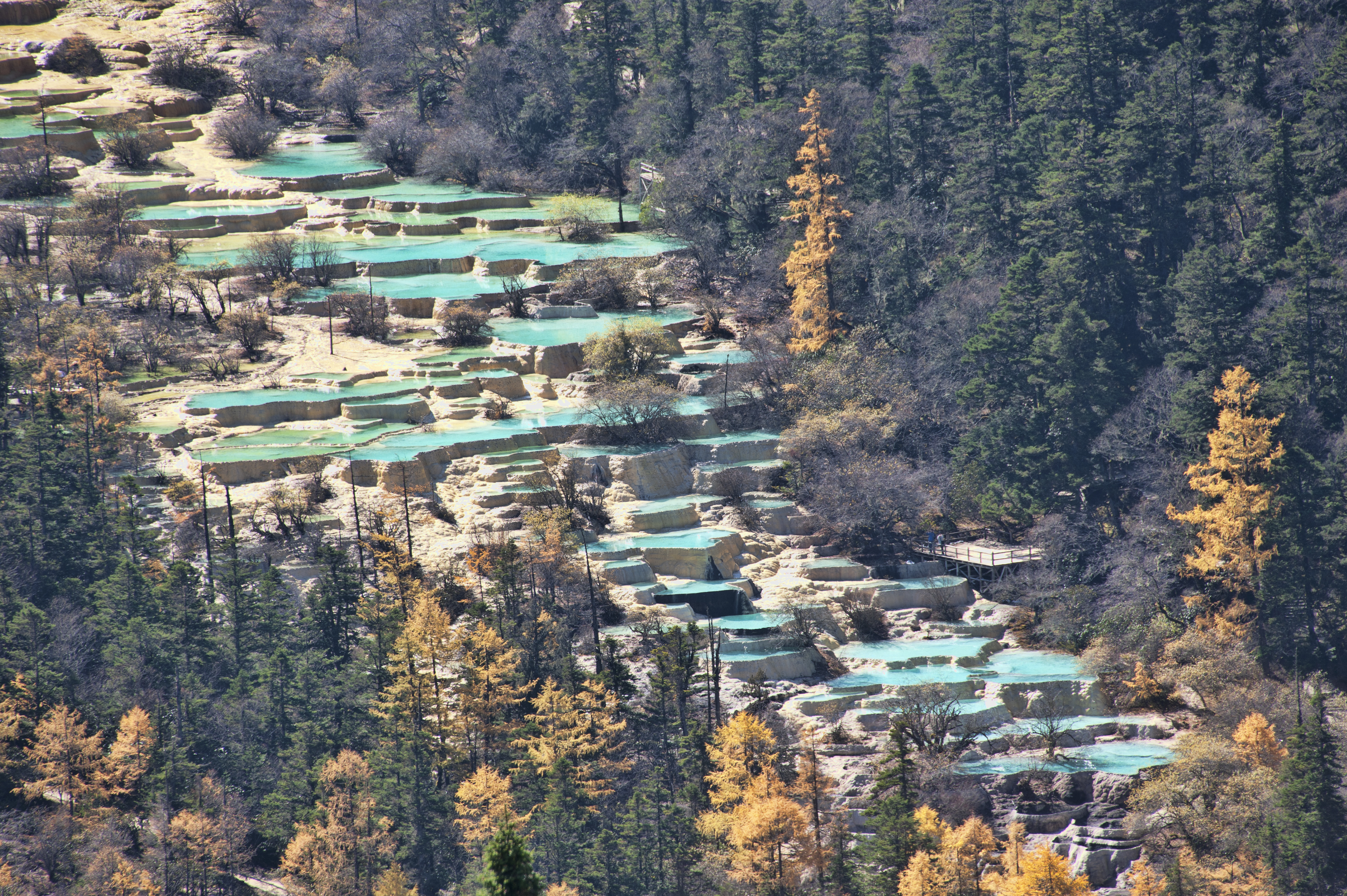

- Location within Sichuan
- Location: Songpan County, Sichuan, People's Republic of China
- Criteria: Natural: (vii)
- Reference: 638
- Inscription: 1992 (16th Session)
- Area: 60,000 ha (230 sq mi)
- Coordinates: 32°44′36″N 103°49′59″E

Huanglong (simplified Chinese: 黄龙; traditional Chinese: 黃龍; pinyin: Huánglóng; lit. 'yellow dragon') is a scenic and historic interest area in the northwest part of Sichuan, China. It is located in the southern part of the Minshan mountain range, 370 kilometres (230 mi) north-northwest of the capital Chengdu. This area is known for its colorful travertine pools formed by calcite deposits, especially in Huanglonggou (Yellow Dragon Gully), as well as diverse forest ecosystems, snow-capped peaks, waterfalls and hot springs. Huanglong is also home to many endangered species including the giant panda and the Sichuan golden snub-nosed monkey. In addition, a large population of the endemic orchid species Cypripedium plectrochilum was discovered at the site. Huanglong was declared a World Heritage Site by UNESCO in 1992 because of its outstanding travertine formations, waterfalls and limestone formations as well as its travertine terraces and lakes rating among the three most outstanding examples in the world.

== Description ==
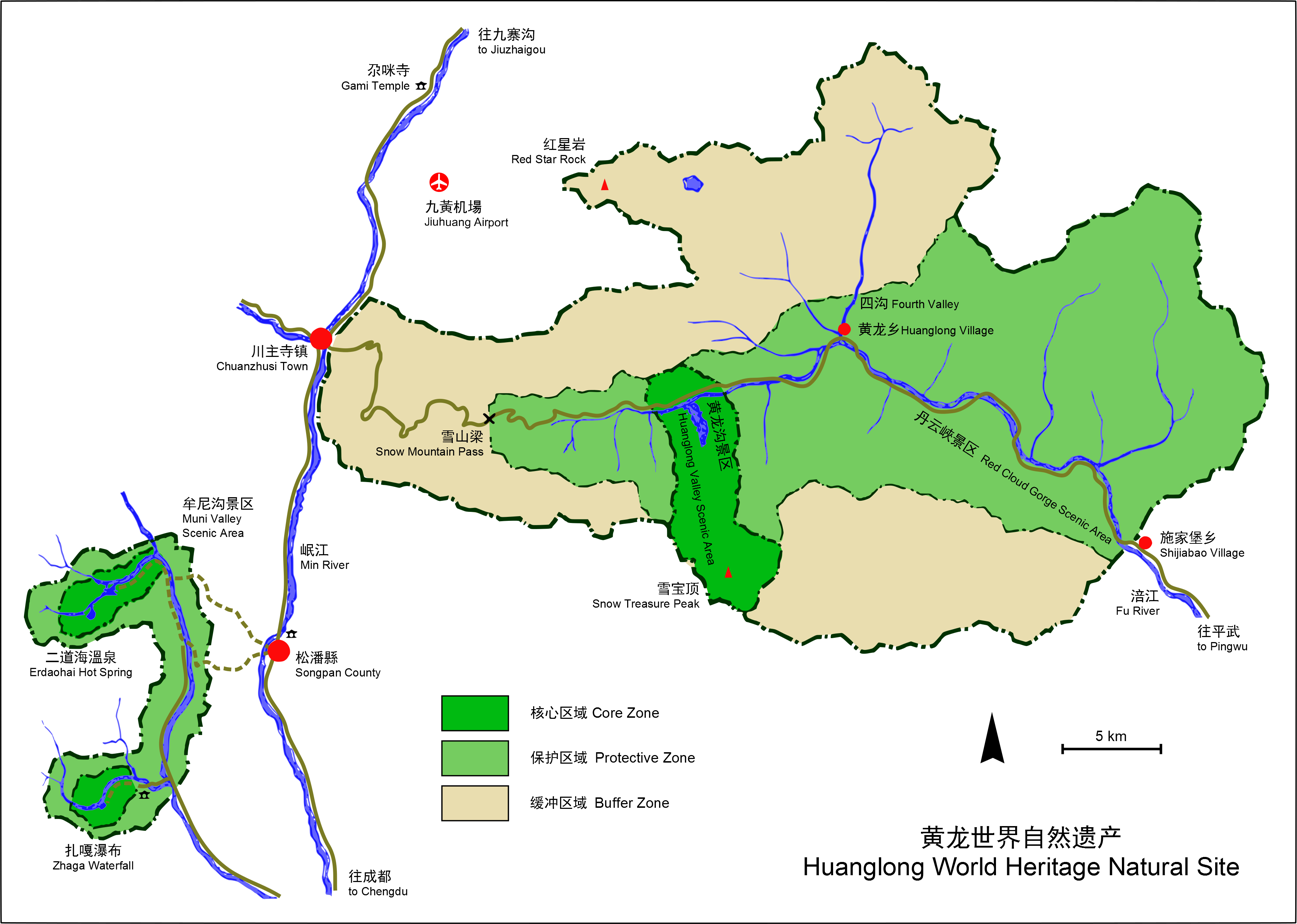
Repeated glaciation events, the unique terrane structure, the formation of tufa, the stratum of carbonic acid rock, and climatic conditions such as Arctic-alpine sunlight have created this world-famous travertine landscape. Huanglong covers an area of 700 km^{2} at an altitude between 1700m and 5588m. Major scenic areas include:

- Huanglong Valley (黄龙沟)
- Danyun Gorge (Chinese: 丹云峽; lit. 'red cloud gorge'): A canyon more than 1,000 meters in depth. The snow melt from the nearby Mount Xuebaoding travels through this canyon, providing much of the water for the region.
- Muni Valley (牟尼沟)
- Xuebaoding (雪宝顶; 'snow treasure peak') – 5,588 m (18,333 ft). The highest peak in the Min Mountains
- Xueshan Ridge (雪山梁; 'snow mountain ridge') – 4,007 m (13,146 ft), the highest point on the road from Jiuhuang Airport to Huanglong Valley.
- Red Star Rock (红星岩)
- Sigou (四沟; 'fourth gully')

=== Huanglong Valley ===
The total length of the travertine in Huanglong Valley is 3.6 km and it is thought to look like a huge golden dragon wheeling through the snow-capped mountains of the valley. The main landscapes are travertine banks, colorful ponds and travertine waterfalls and caves. The main body of water starts from the ancient Buddhist/Benbo temple at the top of the valley and ends at the Guests Welcome Pond in the north with a length of 2.5 km and a width of 30–170m. The colours of Huanglong's waters consist of yellows, greens, blues and browns.

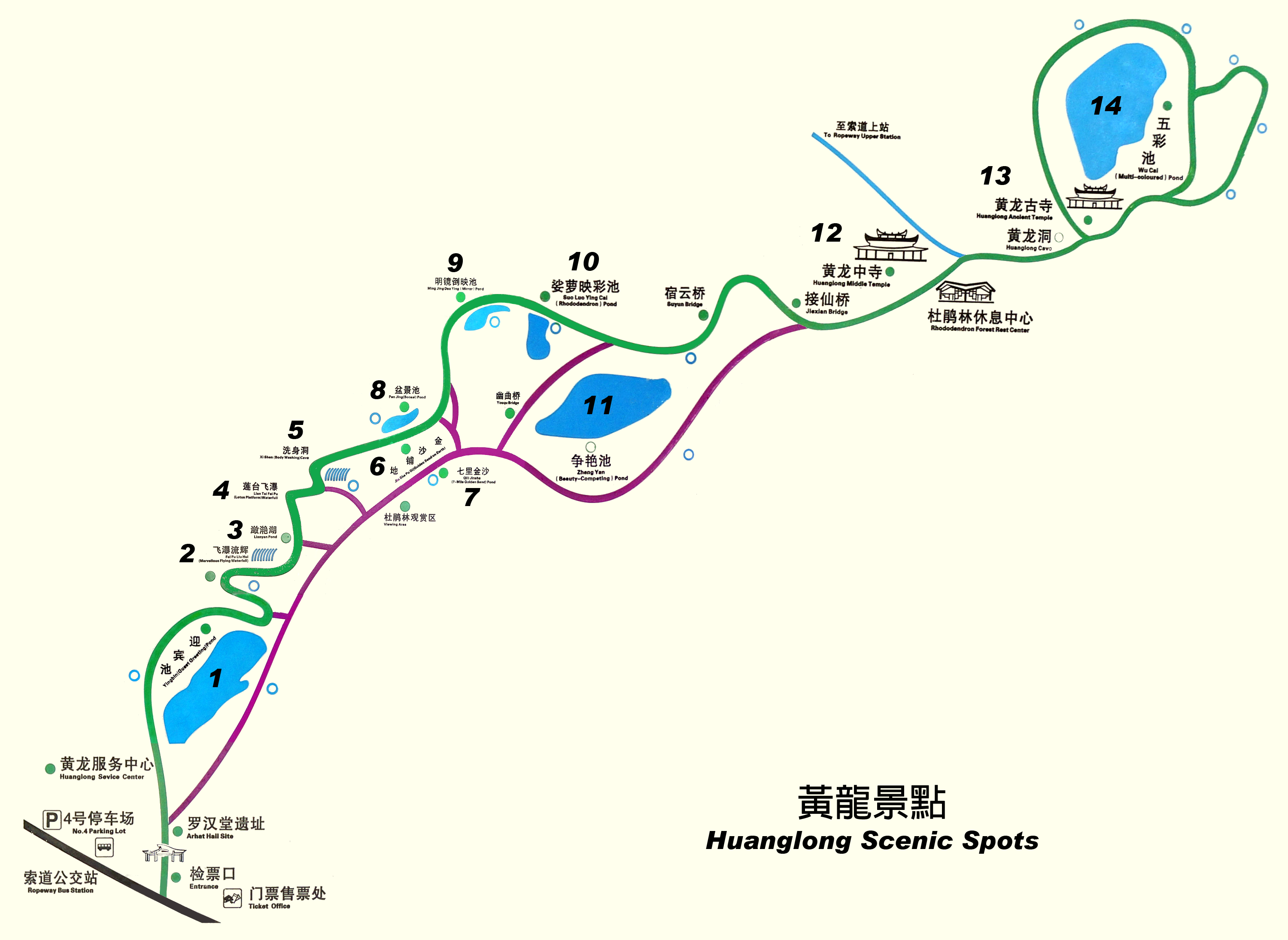
Map of Huanglong Valley Scenic Spots

Aerial view of Zhengyan Pools

	Scenic spots in Huanglong Valley	Sea level	Remarks
1	Guests Welcome Pond 迎宾池	3230m	350 pools
2	Marvelous Flying Waterfall 飛瀑流輝	3245m	14m tall 68m wide
3	Lianyan Pond 瀲灩湖	3251m	2000sq.m
4	Flying Waterfall on Lotus Platform 蓮台飛瀑	3260m	45m tall 19m wide
5	Washing Cave 洗身洞	3280m	10m tall 40m wide
6	Golden Sand Pavement 金沙鋪地	3305m	1300m long
7	Seven Mile Golden Sand 七里金沙	3400m	
8	Bonsai Pond 盆景池	3320m	330 pools
9	Mirror Pond 明鏡倒映池	3400m	180 pools
10	Azalea Pond 娑蘿映彩池	3415m	400 pools
11	Flamboyant Pond 爭豔池	3414m	658 pools
12	Huanglong Middle Temple 黃龍中寺	3470m	
13	Huanglong Ancient Temple 黃龍古寺	3568m	
14	Multi-Colored Pond 五彩池	3576m	693 pools

== Gallery ==
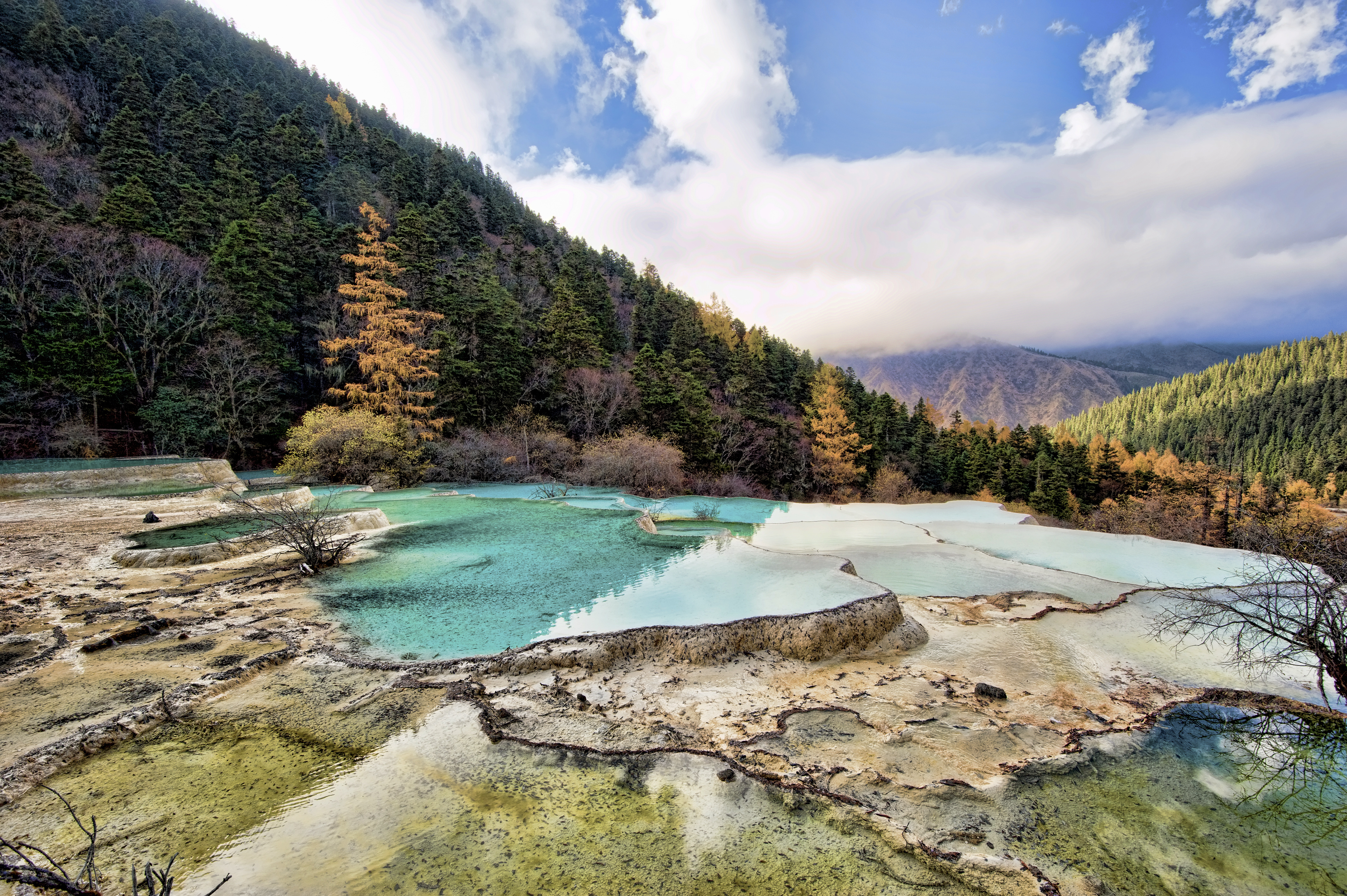

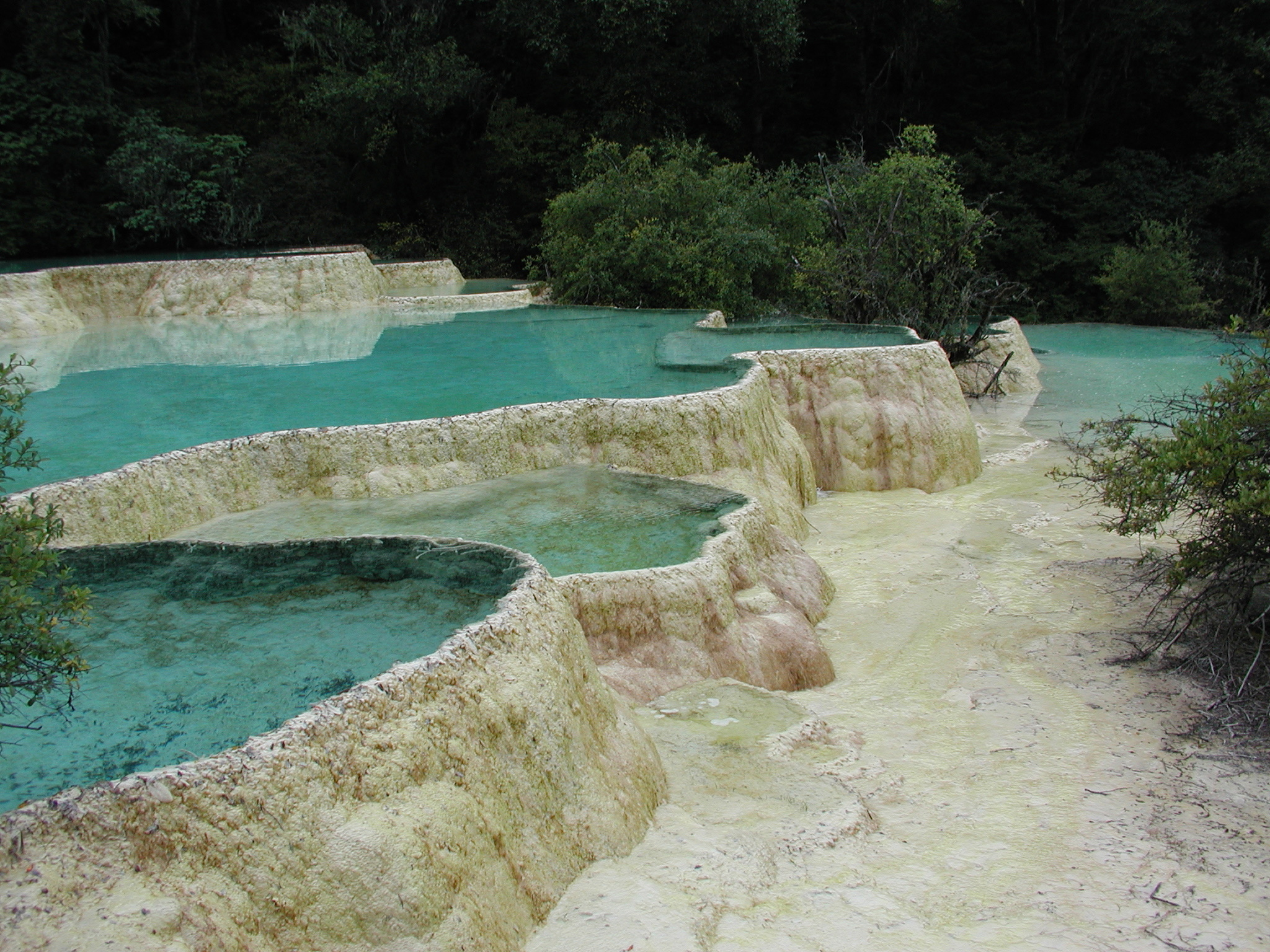

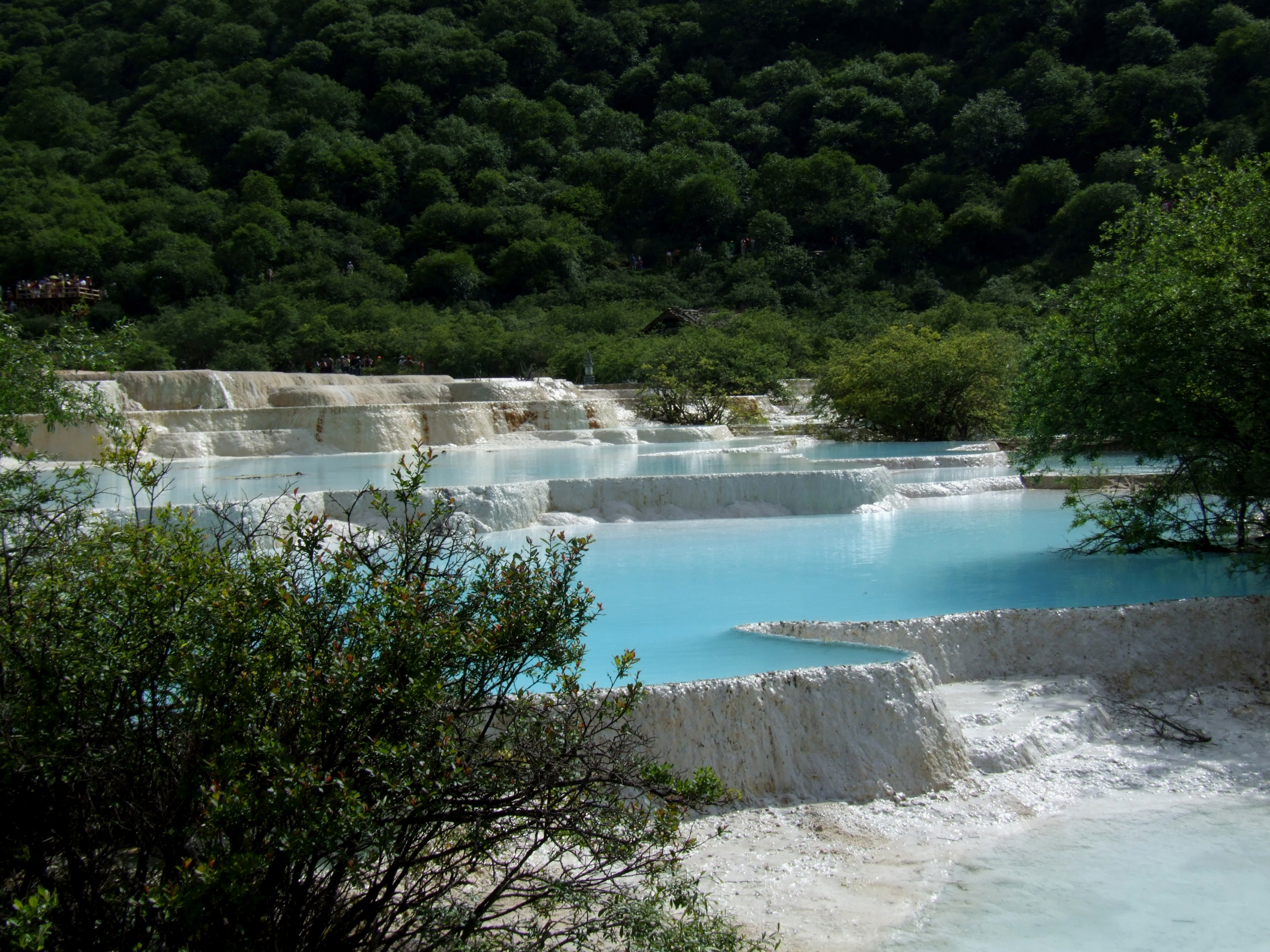

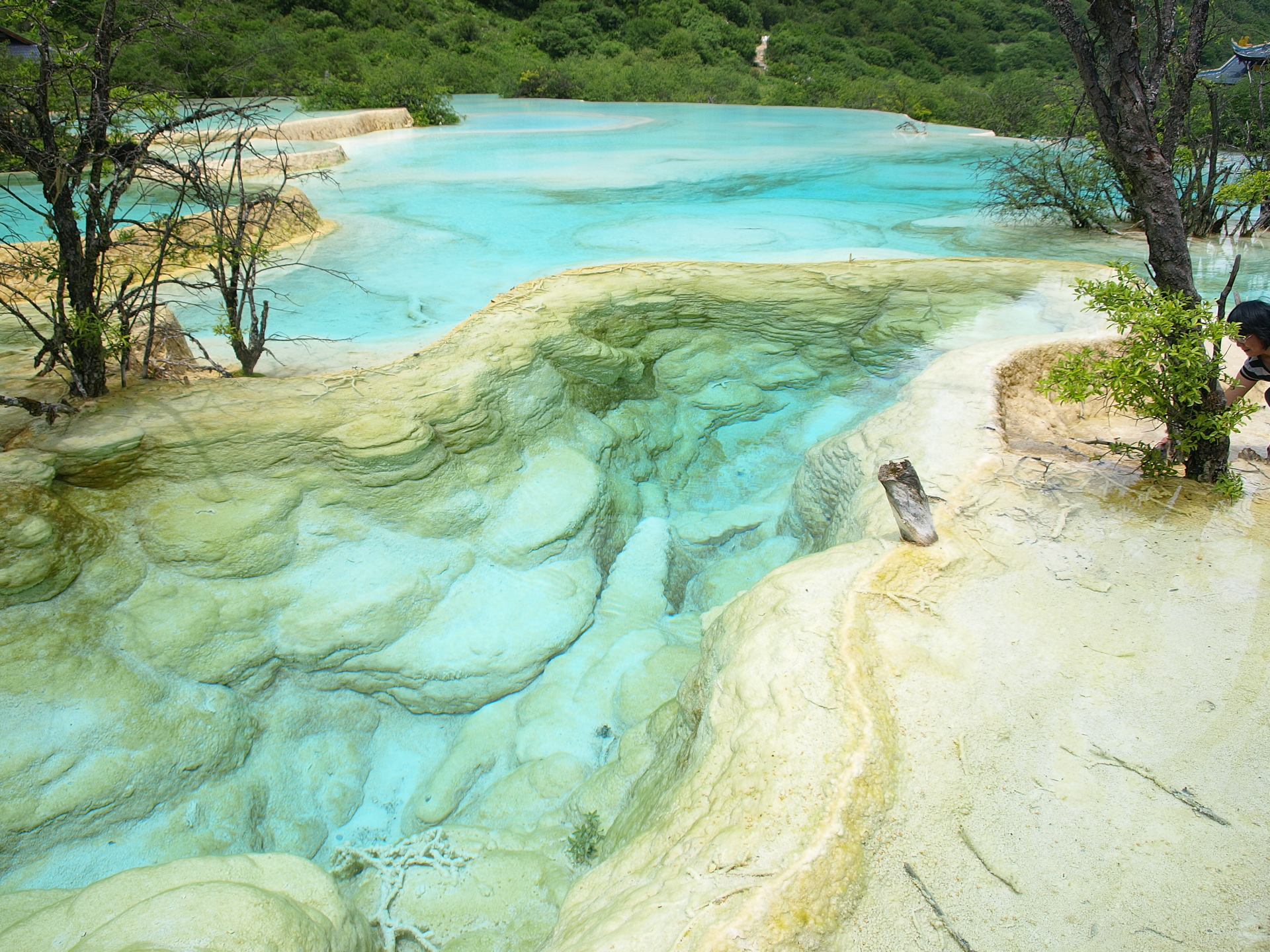

== See also ==
- Baishuitai, Yunnan, China
- Badab-e Surt in Iran
- Mammoth Hot Springs in Yellowstone Park, United States
- Band-e Amir in Afghanistan
- Semuc Champey in Guatemala
- Plitvice Lakes in Croatia
- Pamukkale in Turkey
- Travertine
