= Têwo County =

Têwo County ཐེ་བོ་རྫོང་། · 迭部县 Diebu
- County
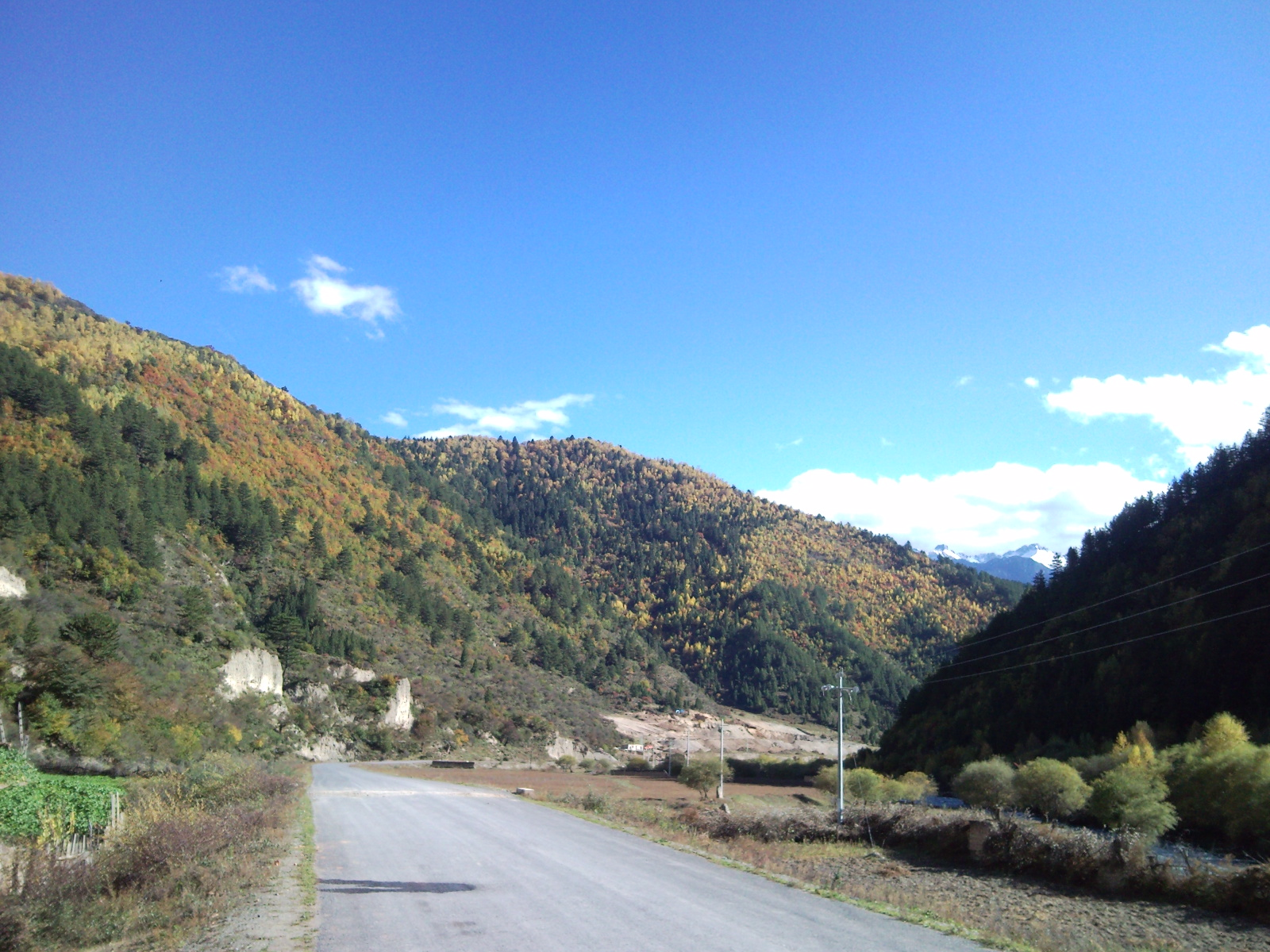

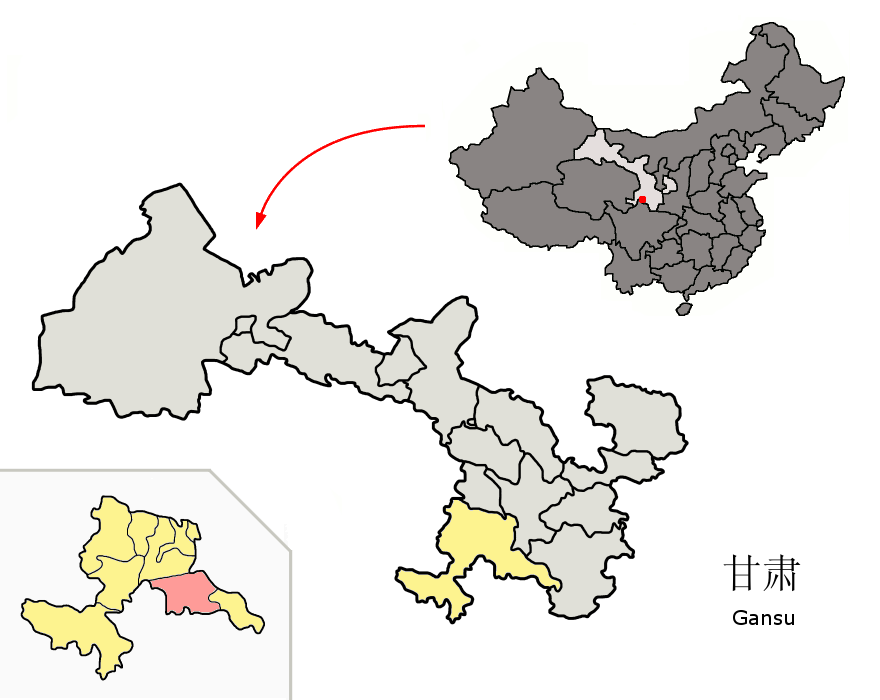
- Têwo County (red) within Gannan

- Location of the seat in Gansu Têwo (China)
- Coordinates: 34°03′22″N 103°13′19″E
- Country: China
- Province: Gansu
- Autonomous prefecture: Gannan
- County seat: Dêngga (Dianga)

Area
  - Total: 5,108.3 km^{2} (1,972.3 sq mi)

Population (2020)
  - Total: 52,192
  - Density: 10.217/km^{2} (26.462/sq mi)
- Time zone: UTC+8 (China Standard)
- Postal code: 747400
- Website: www.tewo.gov.cn

Têwo County

Chinese name
- Simplified Chinese: 迭部县
- Traditional Chinese: 迭部縣
Transcriptions
Standard Mandarin
- Hanyu Pinyin: Diébù Xiàn

Tibetan name
- Tibetan: ཐེ་བོ་རྫོང་།
Transcriptions
- Wylie: the bo rdzong
- Tibetan Pinyin: Têwo Zong

Têwo County (Tibetan: ཐེ་བོ་རྫོང་།; Chinese: 迭部县) is a county in the south of Gansu province of China, bordering Sichuan province to the south. It is under the administration of the prefecture-level city of Gannan Prefecture. Its postal code is 747400, and in 1999 its population was 55,568 people.

The Lazikou Pass, a mountain pass of strategical significance during the Long March, is located in Têwo County.

== Administrative divisions ==
Têwo County is divided to 5 towns and 6 townships.

Name	Simplified Chinese	Hanyu Pinyin	Tibetan	Wylie	Administrative division code
Towns
Dêngga Town (Dianga)	电尕镇	Diàngā Zhèn	སྟེང་ཀ་གྲོང་རྡལ།	steng ka grong rdal	623024100
Yiwa Town	益哇镇	Yìwā Zhèn	གཡི་བ་གྲོང་རྡལ་།	gyi ba grong rdal	623024101
Wangsang Town (Wangzang)	旺藏镇	Wàngzàng Zhèn	དབང་བཟང་གྲོང་རྡལ།	dbang bzang grong rdal	623024102
Lasargag Town (Lazikou)	腊子口镇	Làzǐkǒu Zhèn	ལ་གཟར་འགག་གྲོང་རྡལ།	la gzar ʼgag grong rdal	623024103
Ritang Town (Luoda)	洛大镇	Luòdà Zhèn	རི་དྭངས་གྲོང་རྡལ།	ri dwangs grong rdal	623024104
Townships
Kaba Township	卡坝乡	Kǎbà Xiāng	ཁ་པ་ཤང་།	kha pa shang	623024201
Dara Township (Dagra, Dala)	达拉乡	Dálā Xiāng	རྟ་ར་ཤང་།	rta ra shang	623024202
Nyinngo Township (Ni'ao)	尼傲乡	Ní'ào Xiāng	ཉིན་ངོ་ཤང་།	nyin ngo shang	623024203
Axa Township (Axia)	阿夏乡	Āxià Xiāng	འ་ཞ་ཤང་།	ʼa zha shang	623024205
Dora Township (Duo'er)	多儿乡	Duō'ér Xiāng	རྡོ་ར་ཤང་།	rdo ra shang	623024206
Qangbab Township (Sangba)	桑坝乡	Sāngbà Xiāng	བྱ་འབབ་ཤང་།	bya ʼbab shang	623024207

== Climate ==
Climate data for Têwo, elevation 2,374 m (7,789 ft), (1991–2020 normals, extremes 1981–present)
Month	Jan	Feb	Mar	Apr	May	Jun	Jul	Aug	Sep	Oct	Nov	Dec	Year
Record high °C (°F)	21.0 (69.8)	23.6 (74.5)	28.7 (83.7)	33.9 (93.0)	32.7 (90.9)	33.3 (91.9)	35.5 (95.9)	34.5 (94.1)	33.9 (93.0)	25.7 (78.3)	21.7 (71.1)	17.4 (63.3)	35.5 (95.9)
Mean daily maximum °C (°F)	6.7 (44.1)	10.1 (50.2)	14.2 (57.6)	18.5 (65.3)	20.9 (69.6)	23.3 (73.9)	25.7 (78.3)	25.6 (78.1)	21.0 (69.8)	16.0 (60.8)	12.5 (54.5)	7.7 (45.9)	16.8 (62.3)
Daily mean °C (°F)	−3.2 (26.2)	0.4 (32.7)	4.6 (40.3)	9.1 (48.4)	12.2 (54.0)	15.2 (59.4)	17.5 (63.5)	17.1 (62.8)	13.4 (56.1)	8.0 (46.4)	2.5 (36.5)	−2.4 (27.7)	7.9 (46.2)
Mean daily minimum °C (°F)	−9.9 (14.2)	−6.4 (20.5)	−2.1 (28.2)	1.9 (35.4)	5.6 (42.1)	9.2 (48.6)	11.6 (52.9)	11.4 (52.5)	8.7 (47.7)	3.2 (37.8)	−3.8 (25.2)	−9.0 (15.8)	1.7 (35.1)
Record low °C (°F)	−18.9 (−2.0)	−17.8 (0.0)	−17.1 (1.2)	−7.0 (19.4)	−2.9 (26.8)	−0.4 (31.3)	2.6 (36.7)	2.6 (36.7)	−2.0 (28.4)	−8.2 (17.2)	−14.1 (6.6)	−19.9 (−3.8)	−19.9 (−3.8)
Average precipitation mm (inches)	3.1 (0.12)	5.0 (0.20)	13.9 (0.55)	37.1 (1.46)	84.4 (3.32)	80.9 (3.19)	104.3 (4.11)	98.3 (3.87)	92.8 (3.65)	48.5 (1.91)	7.8 (0.31)	1.4 (0.06)	577.5 (22.75)
Average precipitation days (≥ 0.1 mm)	4.1	3.9	8.6	11.7	16.8	17.9	16.9	15.1	16.5	14.4	4.3	2.1	132.3
Average snowy days	6.8	5.9	8.3	2.5	0.2	0	0	0	0.1	1.4	3.2	3.5	31.9
Average relative humidity (%)	52	51	55	57	64	70	71	71	75	73	62	55	63
Mean monthly sunshine hours	199.1	181.8	203.0	203.8	201.4	180.4	200.6	199.9	149.4	161.6	194.3	199.4	2,274.7
Percentage possible sunshine	63	58	54	52	46	42	46	49	41	47	63	65	52
Source: China Meteorological Administration

== See also ==
- List of administrative divisions of Gansu
