= Hongxing, Ngawa Tibetan and Qiang Autonomous Prefecture =

Hongxing 红星乡
- Town
- Hongxingzhen
- Location in Sichuan
- Coordinates: 34°5′48″N 102°44′38″E
- Country: People's Republic of China
- Province: Sichuan
- Autonomous prefecture: Ngawa Tibetan and Qiang Autonomous Prefecture
- County: Zoige

Area
  - Total: 556.5 km^{2} (214.9 sq mi)

Population (2010)
  - Total: 6,592
  - Density: 11.85/km^{2} (30.68/sq mi)
- Time zone: UTC+8 (China Standard)

Hongxing (Chinese: 红星乡) is a town in Zoige, Ngawa Tibetan and Qiang Autonomous Prefecture, Sichuan, China. In 2010, Hongxing had a total population of 6,592: 3,531 males and 2,061 females: 1,792 aged under 14, 4,379 aged between 15 and 65 and 421 aged over 65.

== See also ==
- List of township-level divisions of Sichuan
