= Mount Little Xuebaoding =

Mountain in Sichuan, China

- Location within China

Highest point
- Elevation: 5,443 m (17,858 ft)
- Prominence: 591 m (1,939 ft)
- Listing: Ultra
- Coordinates: 32°38′29″N 103°53′16″E

Geography
- Location: Songpan County, Sichuan, China
- Parent range: Min Mountains

Climbing
- First ascent: 2012 by an international team

Mount Little Xuebaoding (Chinese: 雪宝顶; lit. 'Snowy Treasure Peak'; Tibetan name:Shar Dung Ri) is a mountain near the easternmost edge of the Tibetan Plateau in China. With an elevation of 5,443 metres (17,858 ft), it is the second highest peak of the Min Mountains and the easternmost 5,000 m (16,400 ft) or higher peak on Earth. It is located in Songpan County of the Ngawa Tibetan and Qiang Autonomous Prefecture, Sichuan Province.

Little Xuebaoding was first climbed in May 2012 by an International team: Karim Adouane (France), Linda Eketoft (Sweden), Jon Otto (USA), Asu (China).
