= Maixi Township, Sichuan =

Maixi Township 麦溪乡
- Township
- Maixixiang
- Location in Sichuan
- Coordinates: 34°1′8″N 102°27′38″E
- Country: People's Republic of China
- Province: Sichuan
- Autonomous prefecture: Ngawa Tibetan and Qiang Autonomous Prefecture
- County: Zoige

Area
  - Total: 808.5 km^{2} (312.2 sq mi)

Population (2010)
  - Total: 5,323
  - Density: 6.584/km^{2} (17.05/sq mi)
- Time zone: UTC+8 (China Standard)

Maixi Township (Mandarin: 麦溪乡) is a township in Zoige, Ngawa Tibetan and Qiang Autonomous Prefecture, Sichuan, China. In 2010, Maixi Township had a total population of 5,323: 2,684 males and 2,639 females: 1,475 aged under 14, 3,485 aged between 15 and 65 and 363 aged over 65.

== See also ==
- List of township-level divisions of Sichuan
