= Zoigê County =

Zoigê County 若尔盖县 · མཛོད་དགེ་རྫོང་། · Zuxxjji Ruo'ergai
- County
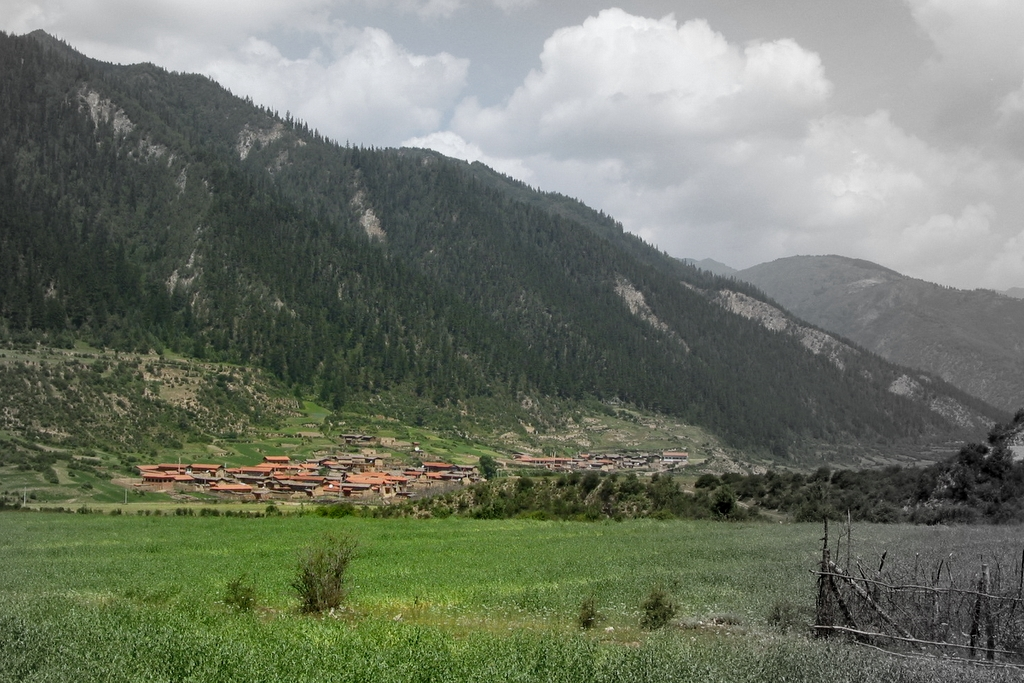
- Baozuo township in Zoigê County

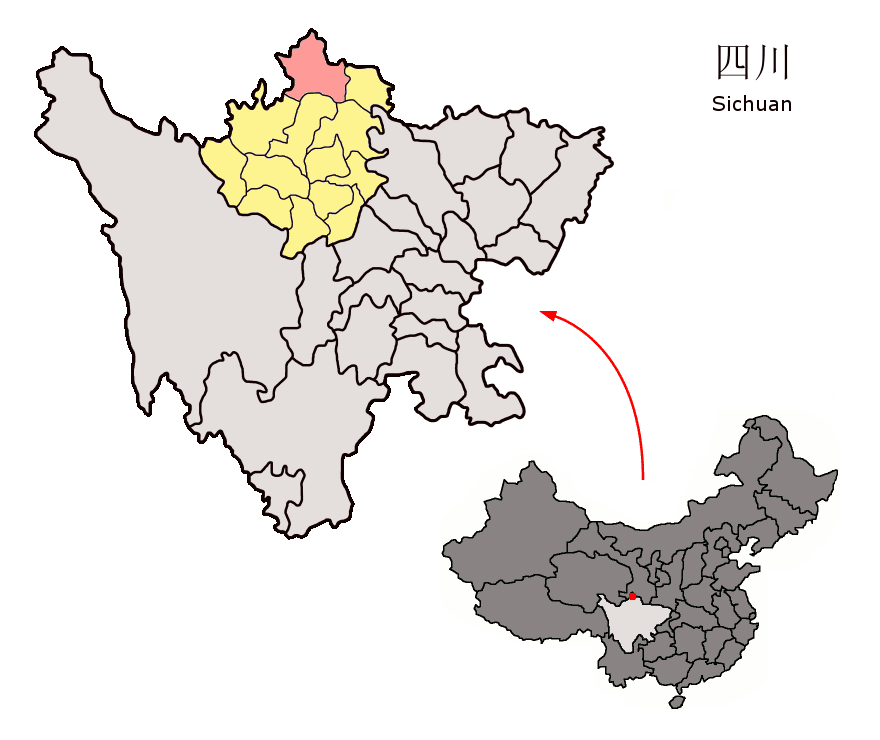
- Zoigê County (pink) in Ngawa Prefecture (yellow) and Sichuan

- Location of the seat in Sichuan Zoigê (China)
- Coordinates (Zoigê County Cultural Pavilion (若尔盖县文化馆)): 33°34′30″N 102°57′43″E
- Country: China
- Province: Sichuan
- Autonomous prefecture: Ngawa
- County seat: Dagcagoin

Area
  - Total: 10,620 km^{2} (4,100 sq mi)

Population (2020)
  - Total: 76,712
  - Density: 7.223/km^{2} (18.71/sq mi)
  - Major nationalities: Tibetan - 90.4%
- Time zone: UTC+8 (China Standard)
- Postal code: 624500
- Area code: 0837
- Website: www.ruoergai.gov.cn

Zoigê County

Chinese name
- Simplified Chinese: 若尔盖县
- Traditional Chinese: 若爾蓋縣
Transcriptions
Standard Mandarin
- Hanyu Pinyin: Ruò'ěrgài Xiàn

Tibetan name
- Tibetan: མཛོད་དགེ་རྫོང་།
Transcriptions
- Wylie: mdzod dge rdzong
- Tibetan Pinyin: Zoigê Zong

Qiang name
- Qiang: Zuxxjji

Zoigê County or Ruo'ergai County (Tibetan: མཛོད་དགེ་རྫོང་།, Wylie: mdzod dge rdzong, ZWPY: Zoigê Zong; Chinese: 若尔盖县; pinyin: Ruò'ěrgài Xiàn) is a county of Ngawa Tibetan and Qiang Autonomous Prefecture in Sichuan, China, bordering Gansu to the north. It is the northernmost county of the province and part of the Tibetan traditional region of Amdo.

It has an area of 10,620 km^{2} (4,100 sq mi) and a population of 69,900, 90.4% of which are Tibetan people.

== Governance ==
Ruo'ergai County Public Security Bureau (Chinese: 若尔盖县公安局) is the primary law enforcement agency of Ruo'ergai county. It operates police stations in Baigyi town, Qoijê Township and Pabso Township.

On 14 July 2022, the Ruo'ergai County Public Security Bureau began a major operation to crack down on firearms and explosives, seizing a total of 198 firearms, 4,300 rounds of ammunition, 10 hand grenades, 20 kg of explosives and an improvised mortar.

The Ruo'ergai County Fire and Rescue Battalion (Chinese: 若尔盖县消防救援大队) provides fire and rescue services in Ruo'ergai county.

== Geography ==
Ruo'ergai County is found in the easternmost sections of the Tibetan Plateau. The county is primarily a highland basin made up of the Zoigê Marsh between the Min Mountains and Amne Machin. The western border of the county, shared with Maqu County in Gansu, is formed by the first major bend of the Yellow River where it changes course nearly 180 degrees and heads back towards Qinghai.

== Climate ==
Ruo'ergai has an alpine subarctic climate (Köppen Dwc), featuring very cold nights even in summertime, and very cold winters with extreme diurnal temperature ranges. Snow can fall any time of the year and usually does not melt until summer due to repeated nightly freezing even when maxima are above 0 °C (32 °F). Therefore, access to Ruo'ergai is heavily restricted during the winter months from late October to early May. Sitting at an altitude of more than 11,000 feet, high-altitude sickness is another common problem for tourists.

Climate data for Ruo'ergai, elevation 3,441 m (11,289 ft), (1991–2020 normals, extremes 1971–2020)
| Month | Jan | Feb | Mar | Apr | May | Jun | Jul | Aug | Sep | Oct | Nov | Dec | Year |
|---|---|---|---|---|---|---|---|---|---|---|---|---|---|
| Record high °C (°F) | 13.6 (56.5) | 16.2 (61.2) | 20.2 (68.4) | 23.5 (74.3) | 23.3 (73.9) | 25.6 (78.1) | 25.2 (77.4) | 26.5 (79.7) | 25.6 (78.1) | 22.6 (72.7) | 16.2 (61.2) | 13.6 (56.5) | 26.5 (79.7) |
| Mean daily maximum °C (°F) | 1.3 (34.3) | 3.6 (38.5) | 6.4 (43.5) | 10.2 (50.4) | 13.2 (55.8) | 15.6 (60.1) | 18.2 (64.8) | 18.0 (64.4) | 14.7 (58.5) | 9.8 (49.6) | 5.7 (42.3) | 2.2 (36.0) | 9.9 (49.9) |
| Daily mean °C (°F) | −8.9 (16.0) | −5.8 (21.6) | −1.5 (29.3) | 2.7 (36.9) | 6.2 (43.2) | 9.5 (49.1) | 11.7 (53.1) | 11.1 (52.0) | 7.8 (46.0) | 2.5 (36.5) | −3.1 (26.4) | −7.7 (18.1) | 2.0 (35.7) |
| Mean daily minimum °C (°F) | −17.2 (1.0) | −13.5 (7.7) | −7.5 (18.5) | −3.1 (26.4) | 0.5 (32.9) | 4.4 (39.9) | 6.1 (43.0) | 5.4 (41.7) | 2.9 (37.2) | −2.3 (27.9) | −9.1 (15.6) | −15.2 (4.6) | −4.1 (24.7) |
| Record low °C (°F) | −33.6 (−28.5) | −31.8 (−25.2) | −26.0 (−14.8) | −17.2 (1.0) | −11.5 (11.3) | −6.6 (20.1) | −3.7 (25.3) | −5.6 (21.9) | −9.6 (14.7) | −15.5 (4.1) | −23.4 (−10.1) | −28.0 (−18.4) | −33.6 (−28.5) |
| Average precipitation mm (inches) | 5.6 (0.22) | 9.7 (0.38) | 20.3 (0.80) | 35.5 (1.40) | 82.7 (3.26) | 104.8 (4.13) | 124.9 (4.92) | 109.9 (4.33) | 103.1 (4.06) | 55.8 (2.20) | 10.1 (0.40) | 3.4 (0.13) | 665.8 (26.23) |
| Average precipitation days (≥ 0.1 mm) | 5.3 | 6.8 | 11.4 | 14.2 | 18.7 | 19.5 | 17.3 | 15.7 | 17.8 | 15.3 | 5.7 | 3.3 | 151 |
| Average snowy days | 7.3 | 9.1 | 15.0 | 14.3 | 9.0 | 1.3 | 0.2 | 0.3 | 2.1 | 12.8 | 8.0 | 4.9 | 84.3 |
| Average relative humidity (%) | 54 | 56 | 61 | 65 | 69 | 73 | 75 | 75 | 77 | 74 | 65 | 57 | 67 |
| Mean monthly sunshine hours | 213.6 | 185.0 | 208.1 | 211.3 | 205.8 | 180.4 | 219.6 | 223.6 | 175.0 | 180.6 | 217.0 | 224.7 | 2,444.7 |
| Percentage possible sunshine | 67 | 59 | 56 | 54 | 48 | 42 | 51 | 55 | 48 | 52 | 70 | 73 | 56 |
Source 1: China Meteorological AdministrationNOAA
Source 2: Weather China

== Transport ==
- China National Highway 213
- China National Highway 248

== Administrative divisions ==
Ruo'ergai County has 7 towns and 6 townships:

| Name | Simplified Chinese | Hanyu Pinyin | Tibetan | Wylie | Administrative division code |
|---|---|---|---|---|---|
Towns
| Dagcagoin Town (Dazhasi) | 达扎寺镇 | Dázhāsì Zhèn | སྟག་ཚ་དགོན་གྲོང་རྡལ། | stag tsha dgon grong rdal | 513232100 |
| Tanggor town (Tangke) | 唐克镇 | Tángkè Zhèn | ཐང་སྐོར་གྲོང་རྡལ། | thang skor grong rdal | 513232101 |
| Xagdom Town (Hongxing) | 红星镇 | Hóngxīng Zhèn | བཞག་སྡོམ་གྲོང་རྡལ། | bzhag sdom grong rdal | 513232102 |
| Qammê Town (Xiaman) | 辖曼镇 | Xiámàn Zhèn | བྱམས་མེ་གྲོང་རྡལ། | byams me grong rdal | 513232103 |
| Baigyi town (Baxi) | 巴西镇 | Bāxī Zhèn | དཔལ་སྐྱིད་གྲོང་རྡལ། | dpal skyid grong rdal | 513232104 |
| A'gyi town (Axi) | 阿西镇 | Āxī Zhèn | ཨ་སྐྱིད་གྲོང་རྡལ། | a skyid grong rdal | 513232105 |
| Têwo town (Tiebu) | 铁布镇 | Tiěbù Zhèn | ཐེ་བོ་གྲོང་རྡལ། | the bo grong rdal | 513232106 |
Townships
| Mêqu Township (Maixi) | 麦溪乡 | Màixī Xiāng | རྨེ་ཆུ་ཡུལ་ཚོ། | rme chu yul tsho | 513232205 |
| Lingwa township (Nenwa) | 嫩哇乡 | Nènwā Xiāng | གླིང་བ་ཡུལ་ཚོ། | gling ba yul tsho | 513232206 |
| Zhingwa Township (Zhanwa) | 占哇乡 | Zhànwā Xiāng | འབྲིང་བ་ཡུལ་ཚོ། | 'bring ba yul tsho | 513232210 |
| Gyangca Township (Jiangzha) | 降扎乡 | Jiàngzhā Xiāng | རྐྱང་ཚ་ཡུལ་ཚོ། | rkyang tsha yul tsho | 513232211 |
| Qoijê Township (Qiuji) | 求吉乡 | Qiújí Xiāng | ཆོས་རྗེ་ཡུལ་ཚོ། | chos rje yul tsho | 513232214 |
| Pabso Township (Bobso, Baozuo) | 包座乡 | Bāozuò Xiāng | བབ་བཟོ་ཡུལ་ཚོ། | bab bzo yul tsho | 513232215 |

== National priority protected sites ==
There are two National Priority protected sites in Ruo'ergai County.

- Aba Long March Relics - added as part of the 6th Batch of National Priority Protected Sites in 2006
  - Baozuo battlefield relics
  - Baxi Conference Site
- Dagcagoin Monastery - added as part of the 7th Batch of National Priority Protected Sites in 2013
