= Lazikou Pass =

Mountain pass in China

- 腊子口
- Location within China Location within Gansu
- Traversed by: Gansu Provincial Road S210

Third Approach
- Location: Têwo County, Gannan Prefecture, Gansu, China
- Range: Min Mountains
- Coordinates: 34°6′32.77″N 103°53′38.14″E

Lazikou Pass

Chinese name
- Traditional Chinese: 臘子口
- Simplified Chinese: 腊子口
Transcriptions
Standard Mandarin
- Hanyu Pinyin: Làzǐkǒu

Tibetan name
- Tibetan: ལ་རྩེ་ཁོག
Transcriptions
- Wylie: la rtse khog

The Lazikou Pass (Chinese: 腊子口), also known as Latsekhok (Tibetan: ལ་རྩེ་ཁོག), is a narrow mountain pass in the Min Mountain Range, Têwo County, Gannan Tibetan Autonomous Prefecture, southern Gansu, Northwestern part of China. The pass forms a gateway between northwestern Sichuan (Ngawa) and southern Gansu. It is of historical significance due to its strategic importance in the final phase of the Long March.

During the Long March, the Lazikou Pass was the last major obstacle for the forces led by Mao Zedong (i.e. Red Army of China) to reach northern Gansu after their crossing of the Zoigê Marsh. The pass had been fortified with blockhouses by Kuomintang forces and was taken by mountaineers led by Yang Chengwu on September 16, 1935.

In 2014, the 3,735 m long Lazikou Tunnel was completed, which bypasses the mountain pass.
