= Tanchang County =

Tanchang County 宕昌县
- County
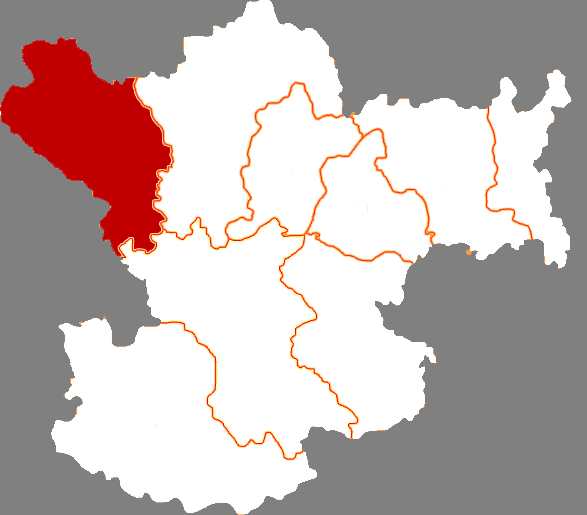
- Tanchang in Longnan

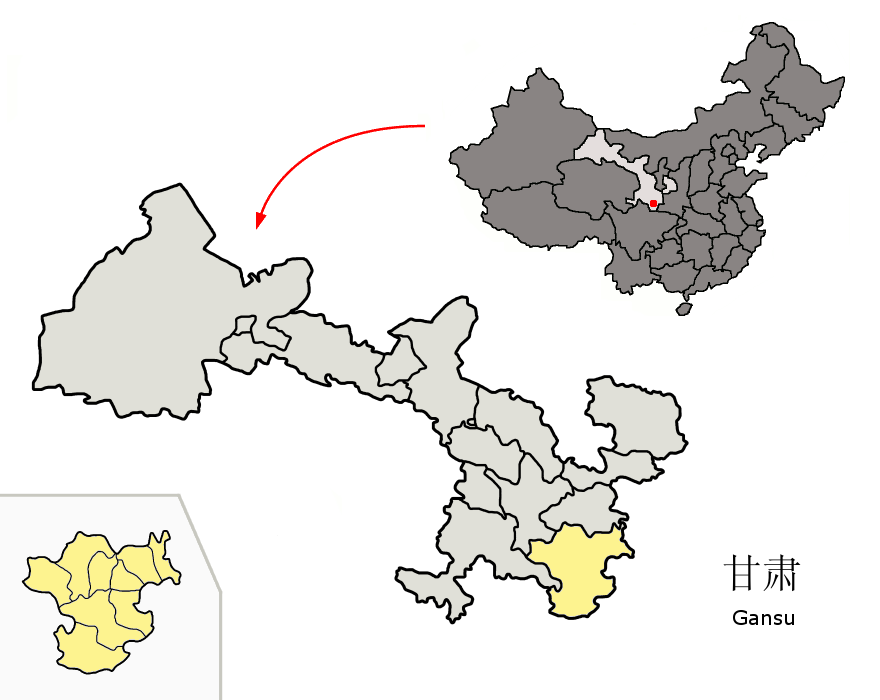
- Longnan in Gansu
- Coordinates: 34°02′49″N 104°23′35″E
- Country: China
- Province: Gansu
- Prefecture-level city: Longnan
- County seat: Chengguan

Area
  - County: 3,331 km^{2} (1,286 sq mi)
- Elevation: 2,300 m (7,500 ft)
- Highest elevation (Leigushan): 4,154 m (13,629 ft)
- Lowest elevation: 1,138 m (3,734 ft)

Population (2017)
  - County: 319,400
  - Density: 95.89/km^{2} (248.3/sq mi)
  - Urban: 35,800
  - Rural: 283,600
- Time zone: UTC+8 (China Standard)
- Postal code: 748500
- Area code: 0939
- Website: www.tanchang.gov.cn

Tanchang (Chinese: 宕昌; pinyin: Tànchāng), also pronounced Dàngchāng, is a county in the south of Gansu province, China. It is the westernmost county-level division of the prefecture-level city of Longnan. In 2017 its population was 319,400 people.

== History ==
During the 4th-5th century, the region was ruled by the Dangchang Kingdom. Then as part of the Western Xia, Tanchang was inhabited by Qiangics.

== Administrative divisions ==
Tanchang County has 11 towns and 13 townships and 1 ethnic township.

Towns

- Chengguan (城关镇)
- Hadapu (哈达铺镇)
- Lichuan (理川镇)
- Nanyang (南阳镇)
- Guanting (官亭镇)
- Shawan (沙湾镇)

Towns upgraded from Townships

- Awu (阿坞镇)
- Nanhe (南河镇)
- Bali (八力镇)

Towns established newly

- Linjiangpu (临江铺镇)
- Lianghekou (两河口镇)

Townships

- Mu'er Township (木耳乡)
- Pangjia Township (庞家乡)
- Jiahe Township (贾河乡)
- Jiangtai Township (将台乡)
- Chela Township (车拉乡)
- Haodi Township (好梯乡)
- Hanyuan Township (韩院乡)
- Zhuyuan Township (竹院乡)
- Xinghua Township (兴化乡)
- Ganjiangtou Township (甘江头乡)
- Xinzhai Township (新寨乡)
- Shizi Township (狮子乡)

Townships established newly

- Hejiabao Township (何家堡乡)

Former Townships

- Boji Township (簸箕乡)
- Jinmu Township (金木乡)
- Niujia Township (牛家乡)
- Dashe Township (大舍乡)
- Hejiabao Township (何家堡乡)
- Qinyu Township (秦峪乡)
- Huama Township (化马乡)

Ethnic township

- Xinchengzi Tibetan Ethnic Township (新城子藏族乡)

== Climate ==
Climate data for Tanchang, elevation 1,753 m (5,751 ft), (1991–2020 normals, extremes 1981–2010)
Month	Jan	Feb	Mar	Apr	May	Jun	Jul	Aug	Sep	Oct	Nov	Dec	Year
Record high °C (°F)	15.2 (59.4)	22.3 (72.1)	30.3 (86.5)	30.9 (87.6)	33.0 (91.4)	33.7 (92.7)	36.7 (98.1)	34.1 (93.4)	33.8 (92.8)	25.7 (78.3)	23.1 (73.6)	17.4 (63.3)	36.7 (98.1)
Mean daily maximum °C (°F)	5.6 (42.1)	8.4 (47.1)	13.3 (55.9)	18.7 (65.7)	22.2 (72.0)	25.1 (77.2)	27.5 (81.5)	26.7 (80.1)	21.7 (71.1)	16.5 (61.7)	12.1 (53.8)	7.0 (44.6)	17.1 (62.7)
Daily mean °C (°F)	−1.6 (29.1)	1.6 (34.9)	6.2 (43.2)	11.2 (52.2)	14.8 (58.6)	18.2 (64.8)	20.7 (69.3)	20.0 (68.0)	15.8 (60.4)	10.6 (51.1)	5.1 (41.2)	−0.6 (30.9)	10.2 (50.3)
Mean daily minimum °C (°F)	−6.7 (19.9)	−3.2 (26.2)	1.1 (34.0)	5.4 (41.7)	9.0 (48.2)	12.7 (54.9)	15.5 (59.9)	15.2 (59.4)	11.8 (53.2)	6.7 (44.1)	0.4 (32.7)	−5.6 (21.9)	5.2 (41.3)
Record low °C (°F)	−15.5 (4.1)	−13.4 (7.9)	−13.1 (8.4)	−4.1 (24.6)	−0.4 (31.3)	4.7 (40.5)	6.9 (44.4)	5.7 (42.3)	1.3 (34.3)	−4.6 (23.7)	−10.5 (13.1)	−16.6 (2.1)	−16.6 (2.1)
Average precipitation mm (inches)	4.7 (0.19)	8.0 (0.31)	23.2 (0.91)	48.9 (1.93)	80.8 (3.18)	83.5 (3.29)	87.9 (3.46)	92.5 (3.64)	75.0 (2.95)	58.3 (2.30)	10.8 (0.43)	2.3 (0.09)	575.9 (22.68)
Average precipitation days (≥ 0.1 mm)	5.2	6.0	10.0	12.5	15.8	15.4	14.0	13.4	15.4	14.7	5.8	2.6	130.8
Average snowy days	9.8	9.8	6.1	0.9	0	0	0	0	0	0.2	2.9	6.3	36
Average relative humidity (%)	58	59	60	60	64	68	69	70	75	74	67	60	65
Mean monthly sunshine hours	164.7	142.9	153.3	169.0	184.5	167.1	183.0	176.1	115.6	120.8	151.9	169.4	1,898.3
Percentage possible sunshine	52	46	41	43	43	39	42	43	32	35	49	55	43
Source: China Meteorological Administration

== Transport ==
- China National Highway 212

== See also ==
- Dangxiang
- List of administrative divisions of Gansu
