= Mount Xuebaoding =

5588 m mountain in China

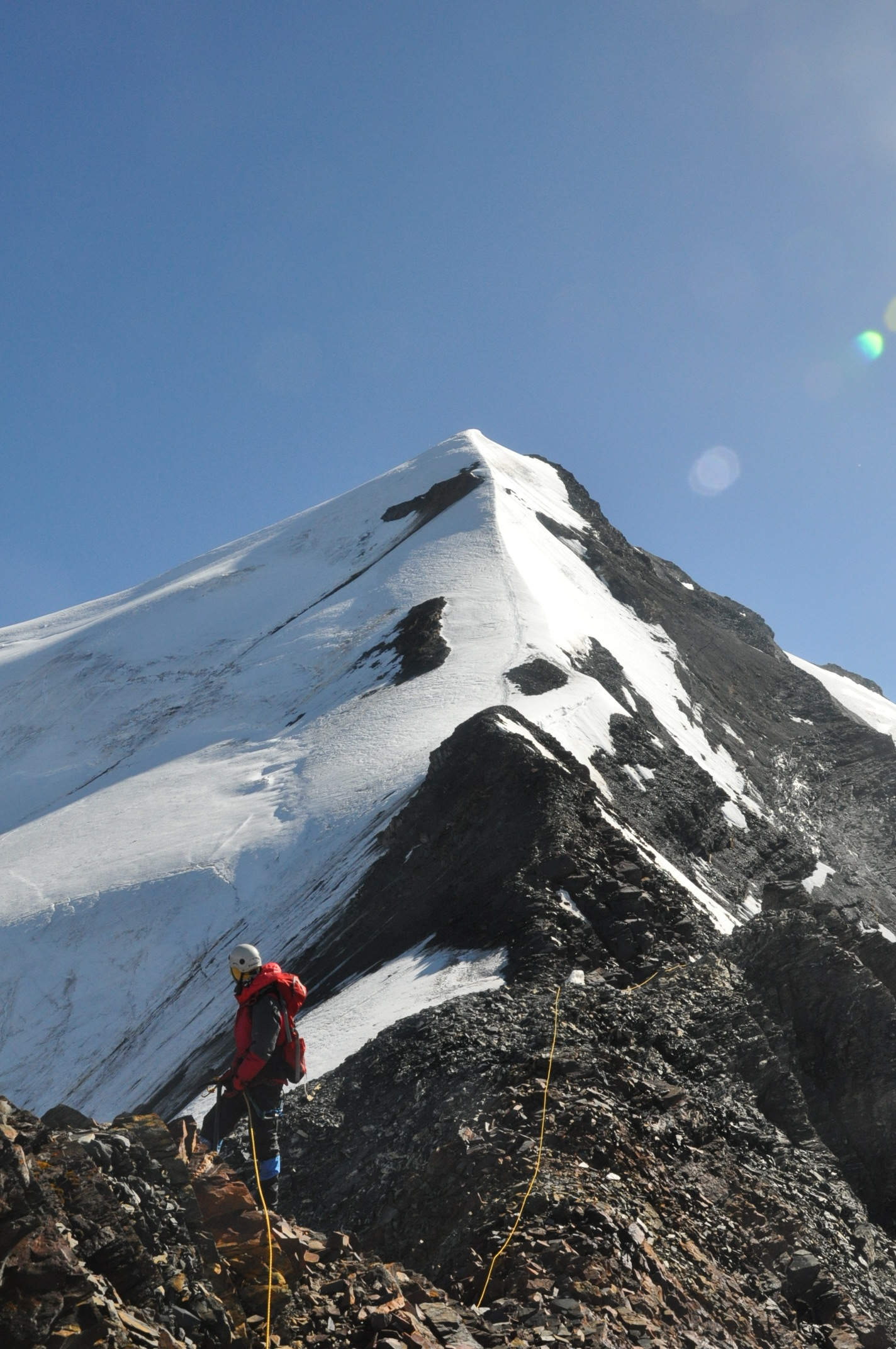

Highest point
- Elevation: 5,588 m (18,333 ft)
- Prominence: 2,057 m (6,749 ft)
- Listing: Ultra
- Coordinates: 32°40′33″N 103°50′48″E

Geography
- Location within China
- Location: Songpan County, Sichuan, China
- Parent range: Min Mountains

Climbing
- First ascent: 1986 by a Japanese team
- Easiest route: snow/ice/glacier climb

Mount Xuebaoding (Chinese: 雪宝顶; lit. 'Snowy Treasure Peak'; Standard Tibetan: Shar Dung Ri) is a mountain near the easternmost edge of the Tibetan Plateau in China. With an elevation of 5,588 metres (18,333 ft) it is the highest peak of the Min Mountains and is Earth's most easterly peak over 5,500 metres (18,000 ft). It is located in Songpan County of the Ngawa Tibetan and Qiang Autonomous Prefecture, Sichuan Province.

Xuebaoding was first climbed in 1986 by a joint Chinese-Japanese expedition.

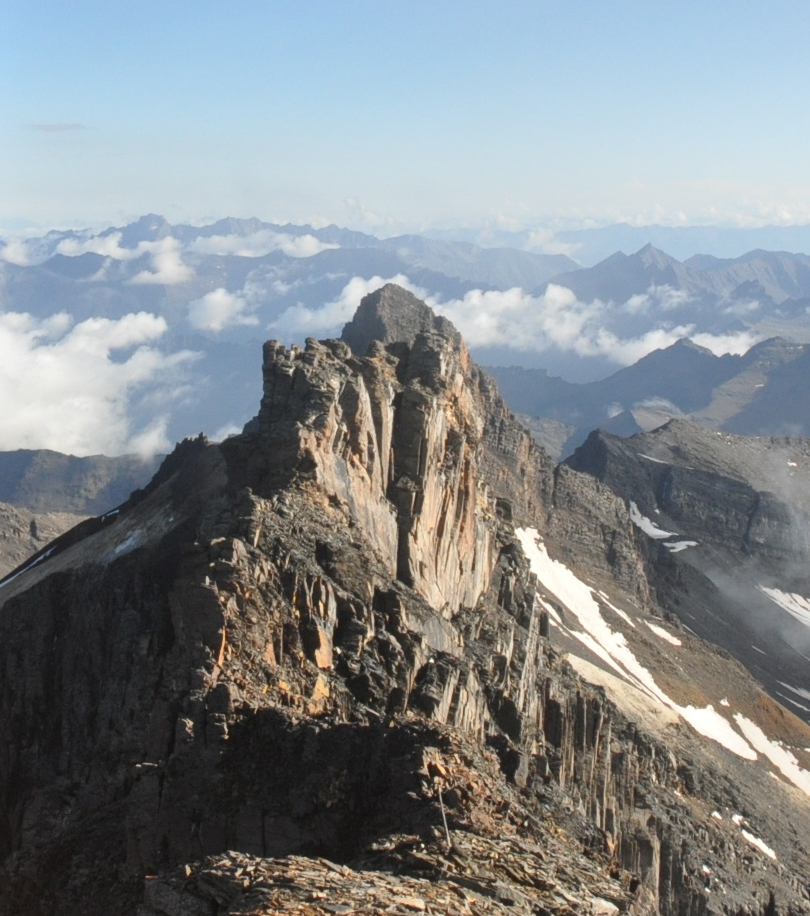
The LuoTuoBei, or Camel's back

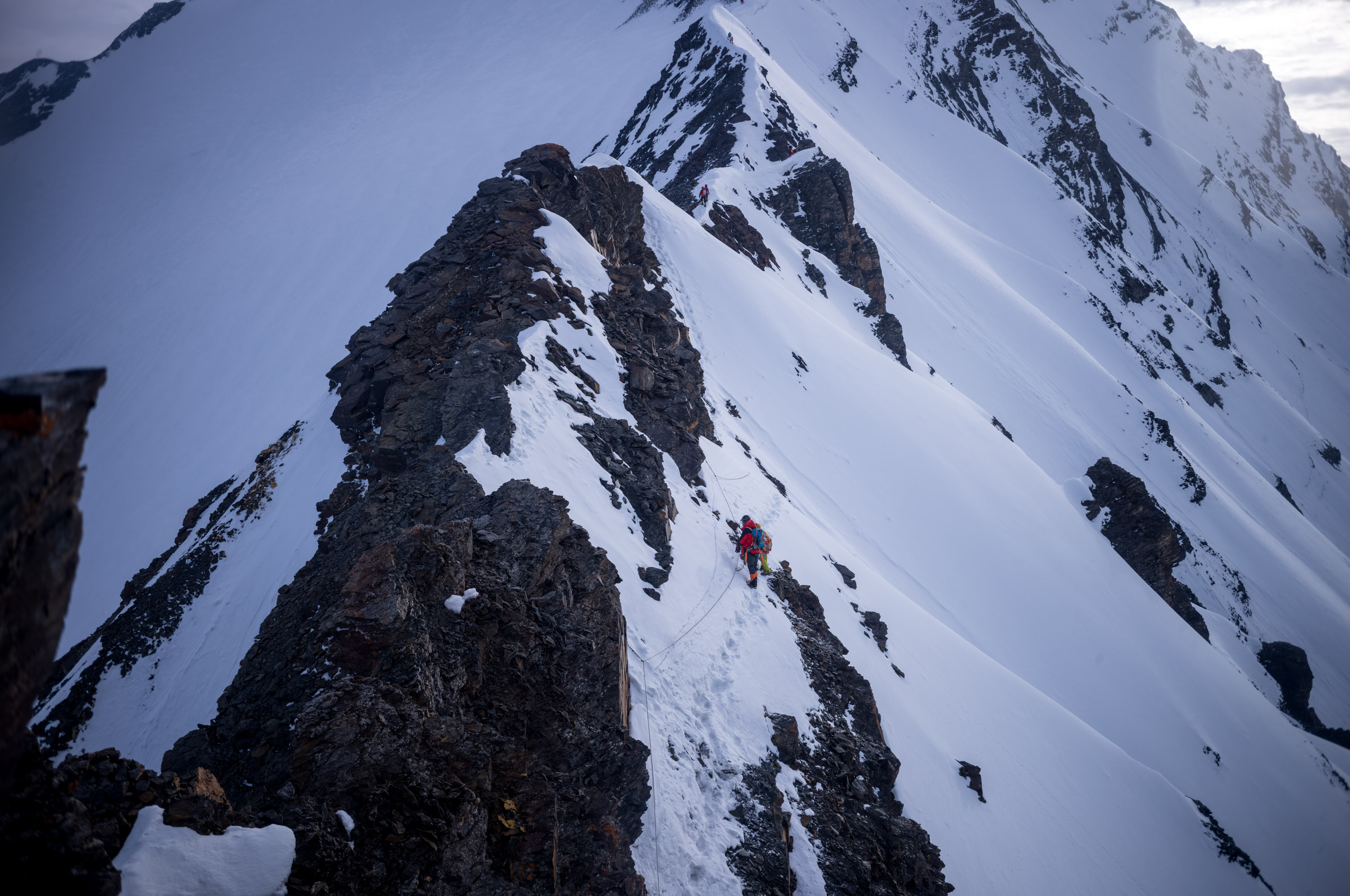
On the way to the summit of Mt Xuebaoding

== See also ==
- List of ultras of Tibet, East Asia and neighbouring areas

== See also ==
- List of Ultras of Tibet and East Asia
