= Min Mountains =

Mountain range in central China

Min Range
- 岷山
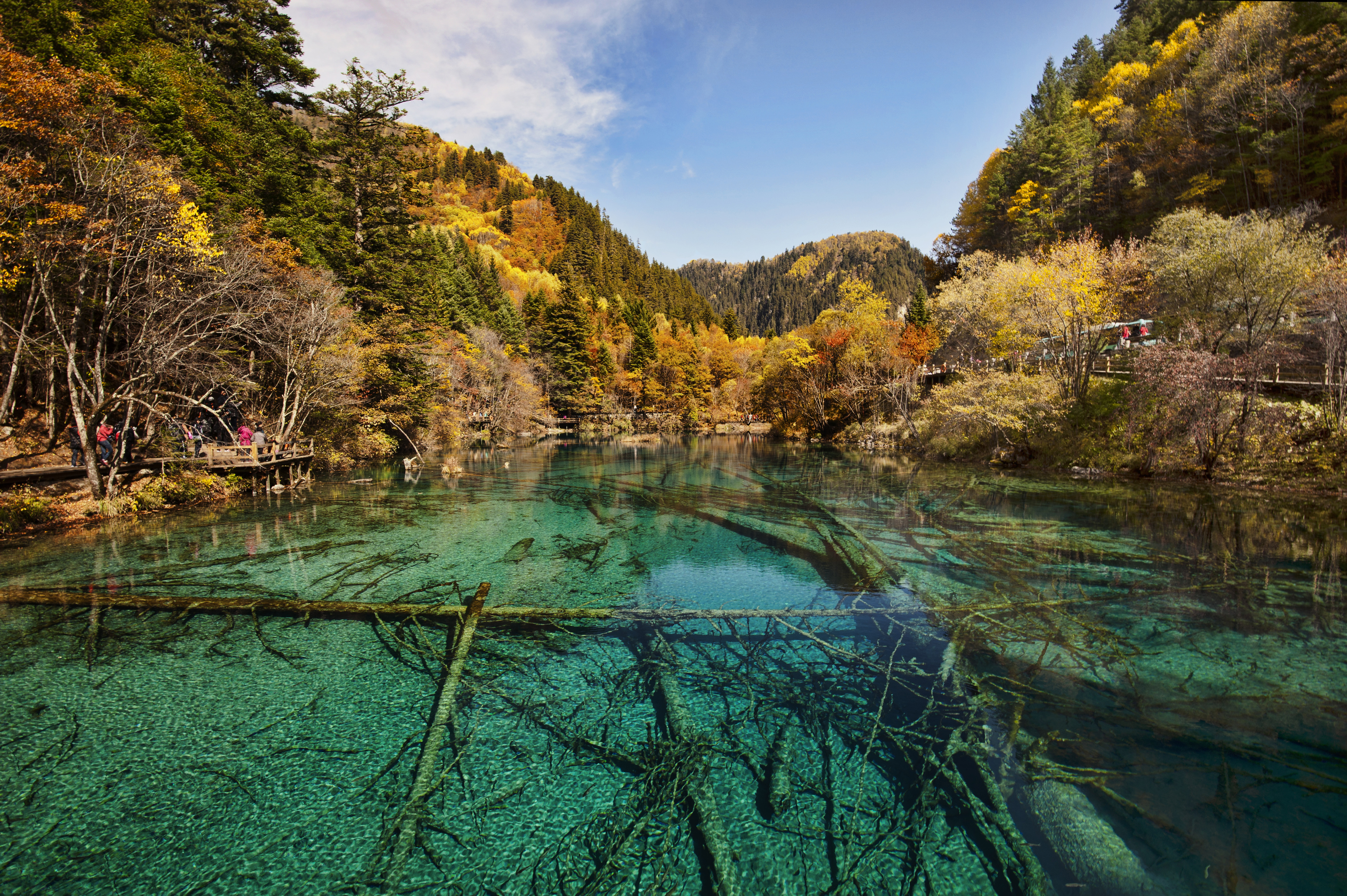
- Landscape in the Jiuzhaigou Valley

Highest point
- Peak: Mount Xuebaoding (Snow Treasure Peak)
- Elevation: 5,588 m (18,333 ft)
- Coordinates: 32°41′N 103°51′E

Geography
- Location within China
- Country: China
- Provinces: Sichuan and Gansu
- Prefecture: Mianyang
- Parent range: Hengduan Mountains

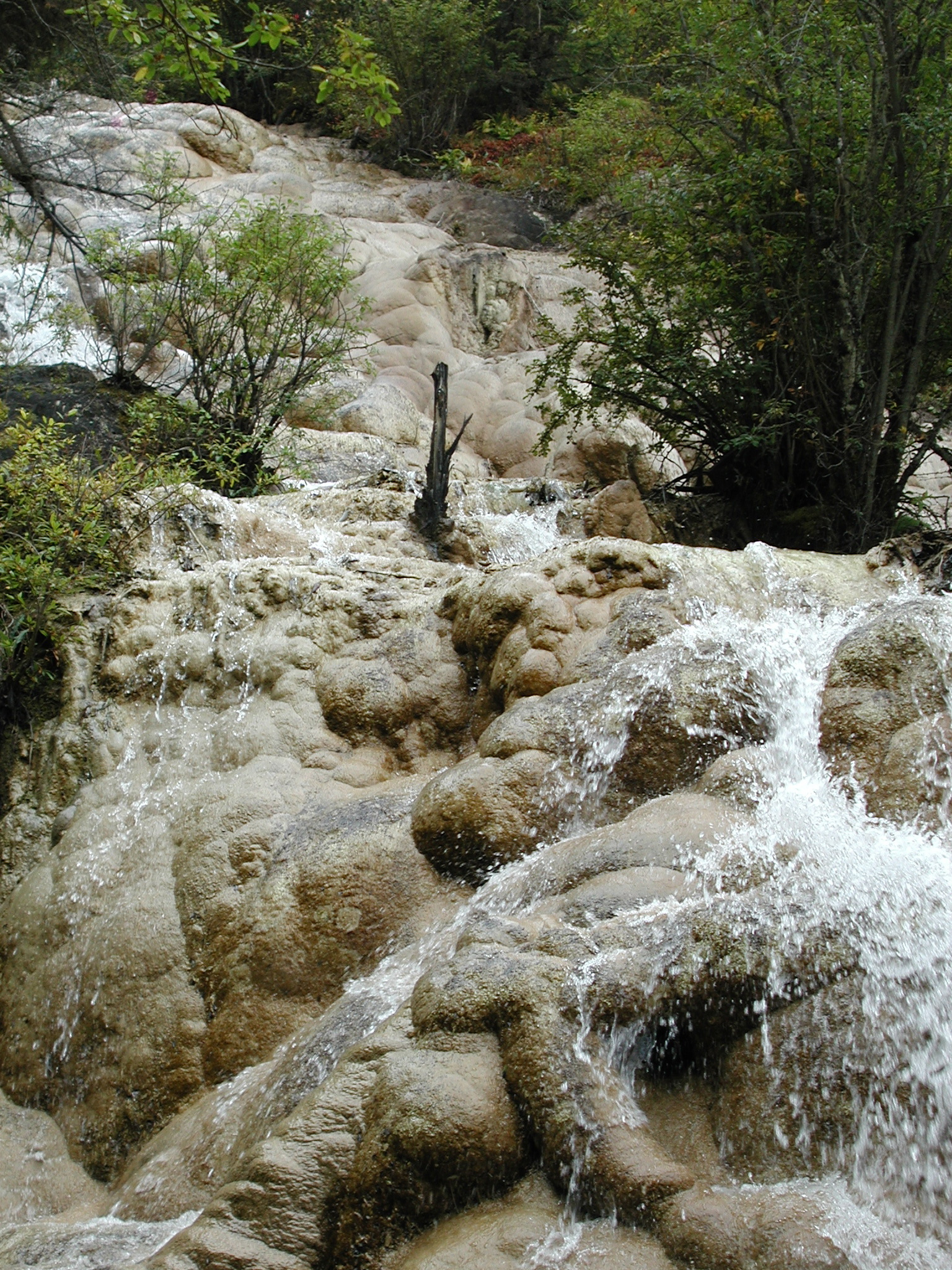
A waterfall at the Huanglong site

Min Mountains or Minshan (Chinese: 岷山; pinyin: Mín Shān) are a mountain range in central China. It runs in the general north-south direction through northern Sichuan (the eastern part of the Ngawa Tibetan and Qiang Autonomous Prefecture and adjacent areas of Mianyang Prefecture-level city) and southernmost borderlands of Gansu. The highest elevation is Mount Xuebaoding ("Snow Treasure Peak"), 5588 m and the second highest is Mt Little Xuebaoding ("Little Snow Treasure Peak"), 5443m.

== Geography ==
The Min mountain range is a southern prolongation of the Kunlun Mountains that separates the basins of two major rivers of Sichuan: the Min River (to the west) and the Jialing River (to the east). Both rivers flow in the general southern direction, and are tributaries of the Yangtze.

The Min Mountains are part of a wider mountainous region:

- Amne Machin: The range located to the far west, known to the ancient Chinese as Mount Jishi (積石山, 积石山, Jīshíshān), part of the Kunlun Mountains.
- Xiqing Mountains (西倾山): The northern range.
- Qionglai Mountains: The central part of the range to the west of the Min River
- Motian Mountains: The easternmost prolongation, merging with the Daba Mountains.

== History ==
According to the Records of the Grand Historian, the Xia dynasty managed this mountain range as early as 2000 BC.

The Lazikou Pass, a site of strategical importance during the Long March, passes through the Min Mountains and connects northwestern Sichuan with southern Gansu.

== Ecology ==
The characteristic ecosystem of the Min Mountains and the Qionglai Mountains (which are located further west, separated from the Min Mountains by the Min River valley) has been described by the World Wildlife Fund as the Qionglai-Minshan conifer forests.

Important tourism and nature conservation objects in the Min Mountains include the Jiuzhaigou Valley Nature Reserve (in Jiuzhaigou County) and the Huanglong Scenic and Historic Interest Area (in Songpan County); both are listed on the UNESCO World Heritage Sites list.
