= Zhangzha, Jiuzhaigou County =

Zhangzha 漳扎镇
- Town
- Location in Sichuan
- Coordinates: 33°17′28″N 103°52′25″E
- Country: People's Republic of China
- Province: Sichuan
- Prefecture: Ngawa Tibetan and Qiang Autonomous Prefecture
- County: Jiuzhaigou
- Communities and villages: List: Heye Community; Shuzheng Community; Zharu Community; Zhangzha Community; Pengfeng Community; Longkang Community; Ganhaizi Community; Zhangzha Village; Longkang Village; Congya Village; Yazha Village; Shaba Village; Erdaoqiao Village; Shangsizhai Village; Langzhai Village; Zhongcha Village; Yongzhu Village; Pengfeng Village

Area
  - Total: 1,348.41 km^{2} (520.62 sq mi)

Population (2020)
  - Total: 13,593
  - Density: 10.081/km^{2} (26.109/sq mi)
- Time zone: UTC+8 (China Standard)
- Postal code: 623402
- Area code: +86 (0)837
- Administrative code: 51 32 25 101

Zhangzha (simplified Chinese: 漳扎镇; traditional Chinese: 漳扎鎮; pinyin: Zhāngzhā Zhèn; Tibetan: གཙང་རྩ་ཀྲེན།, Wylie: gtsang rtsa kren), formerly Jiuzhaigou (simplified Chinese: 九寨沟镇; traditional Chinese: 九寨溝鎮; pinyin: Jiǔzhàigōu Zhèn), is a township-level division under Jiuzhaigou County, Ngawa Tibetan and Qiang Autonomous Prefecture, Sichuan Province, China, with an area of 1,348.41 square kilometres (520.62 mi^{2}), and a permanent population of 13,593 as of 2020.

== History ==
In 1992, the town of Jiuzhaigou following the merger of Longkang Township (Chinese: 龙康乡) and Tazang Township (Chinese: 塔藏乡). On June 19, 1998, Nanping County, which governed the town, was renamed to Jiuzhaigou County, prompting the town of Jiuzhaigou to change its name to Zhangha after the village where its government was seated.

== Administrative divisions ==
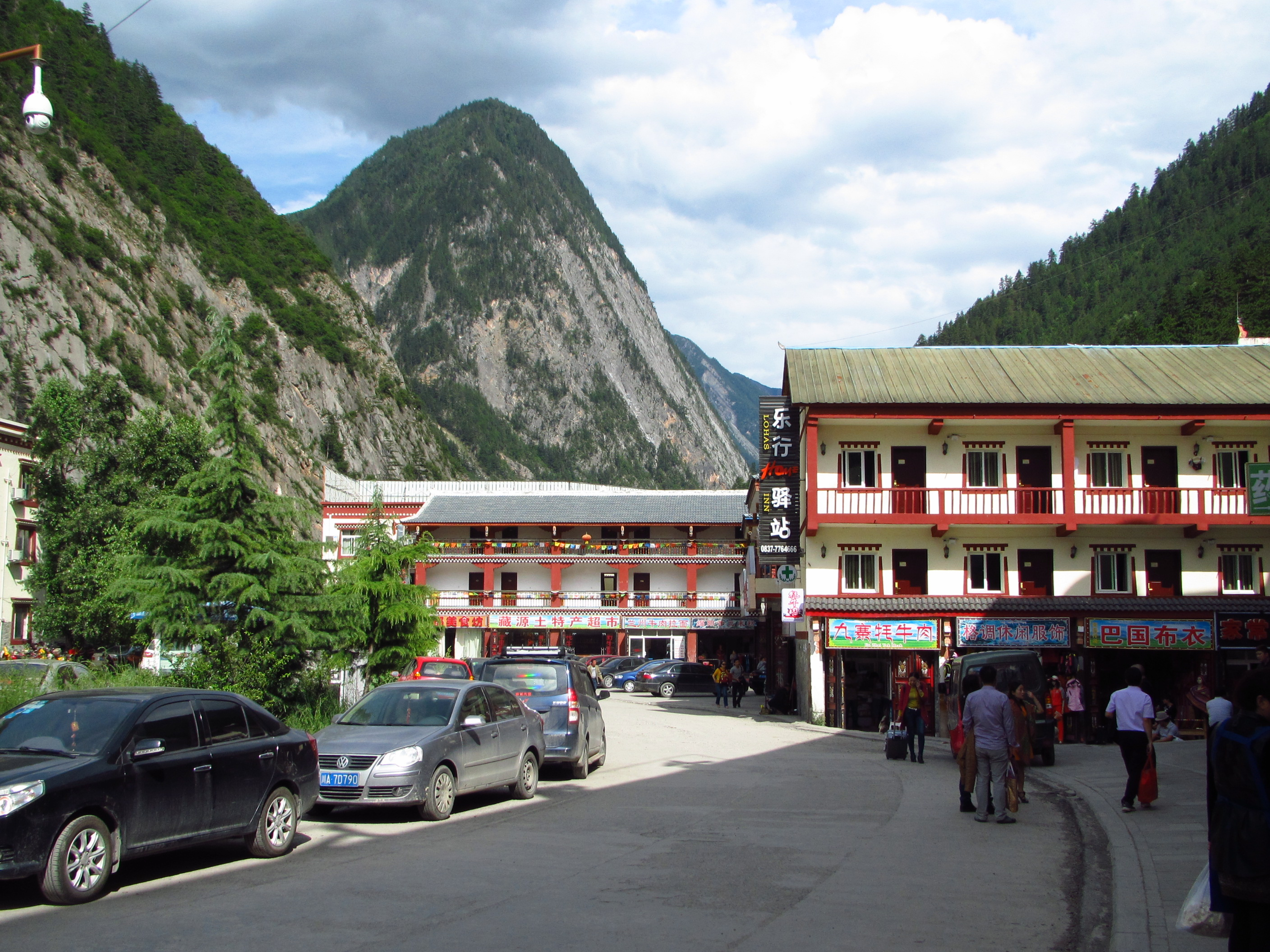
Pengfeng Village in Zhangzha Town in 2014, with Jiuzhaigou Valley in background

Zhangzha has jurisdiction over 7 residential communities and 11 administrative villages.

=== Residential communities ===
The town's residential communities are as follows:

- Heye Community (Chinese: 荷叶社区)
- Shuzheng Community (Chinese: 树正社区)
- Zharu Community (Chinese: 扎如社区)
- Zhangzha Community (Chinese: 漳扎社区)
- Pengfeng Community (Chinese: 彭丰社区)
- Longkang Community (Chinese: 隆康社区)
- Ganhaizi Community (Chinese: 甘海子社区)

=== Administrative villages ===
The town's administrative villages are as follows:

- Zhangzha Village (Chinese: 漳扎村)
- Longkang Village (Chinese: 隆康村)
- Congya Village (Chinese: 丛牙村)
- Yazha Village (Chinese: 牙扎村)
- Shaba Village (Chinese: 沙坝村)
- Erdaoqiao Village (Chinese: 二道桥村)
- Shangsizhai Village (Chinese: 上四寨村)
- Langzhai Village (Chinese: 郎寨村)
- Zhongcha Village (Chinese: 中查村)
- Yongzhu Village (Chinese: 永竹村)
- Pengfeng Village (Chinese: 彭丰村)

== Jiuzhaigou Earthquake ==
On August 8, 2017, Zhangzha Town was the epicenter of the earthquake, causing severe power failure in Jiuzhaigou County and damage to the formerly pristine Jiuzhaigou Scenic Area.

== Demographics ==
The town is home to 7,524 residents registered under the hukou system, belonging to 2,924 households. However, as of 2020, it has a higher permanent population, totaling 13,593.

Zhangzha is predominantly ethnically Tibetan, but has a sizable Han Chinese and Hui population.

== Education ==
As of 2017, Zhangzha has 1 kindergarten, 10 primary schools, and 1 middle school.
