= Jiuzhaigou County =

Jiuzhaigou County 九寨沟县 · གཟི་རྩ་སྡེ་དགུ་རྫོང་། · Rrggucua Sizadêgu
- County
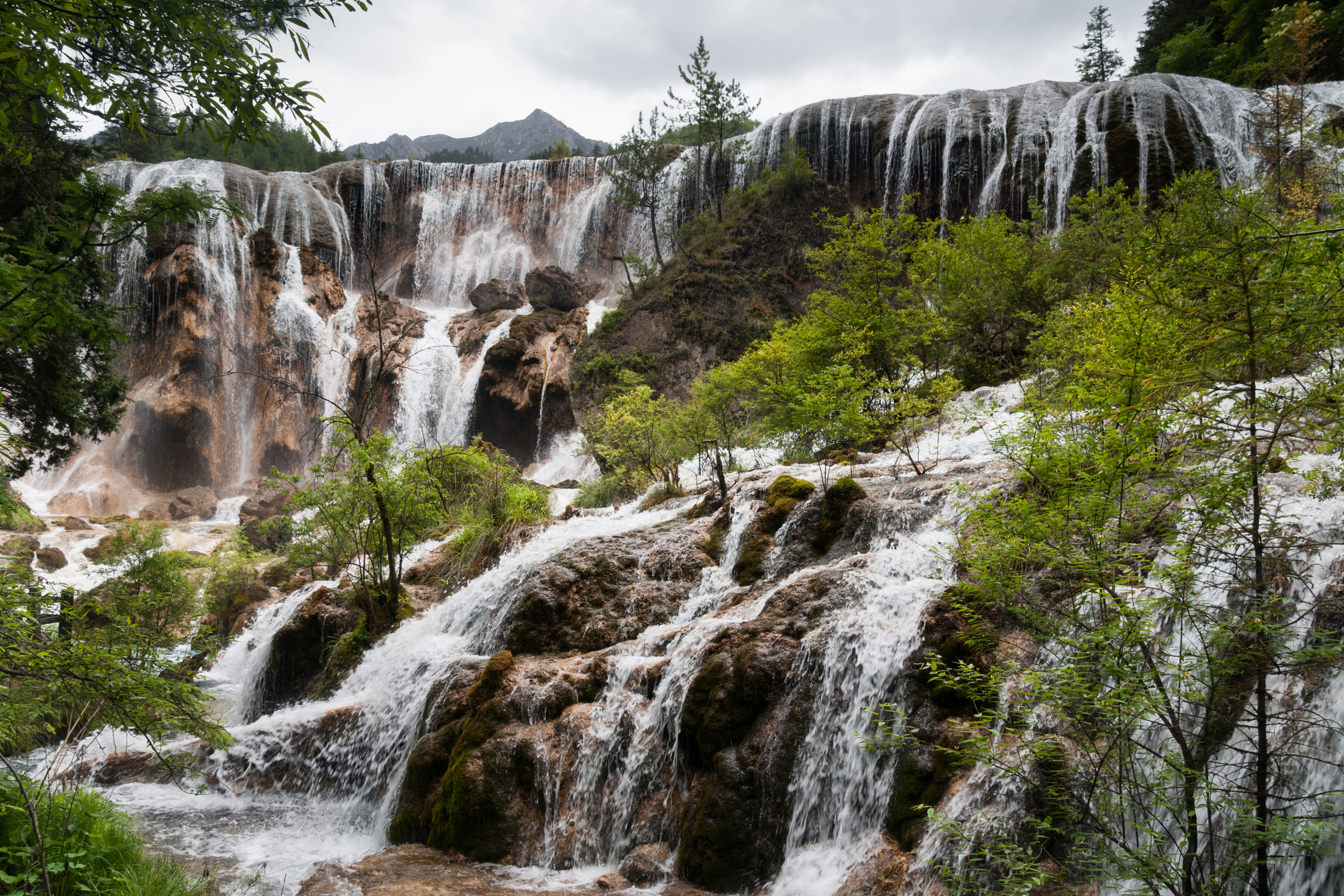
- Pearl Shoals Waterfalls, Jiuzhaigou

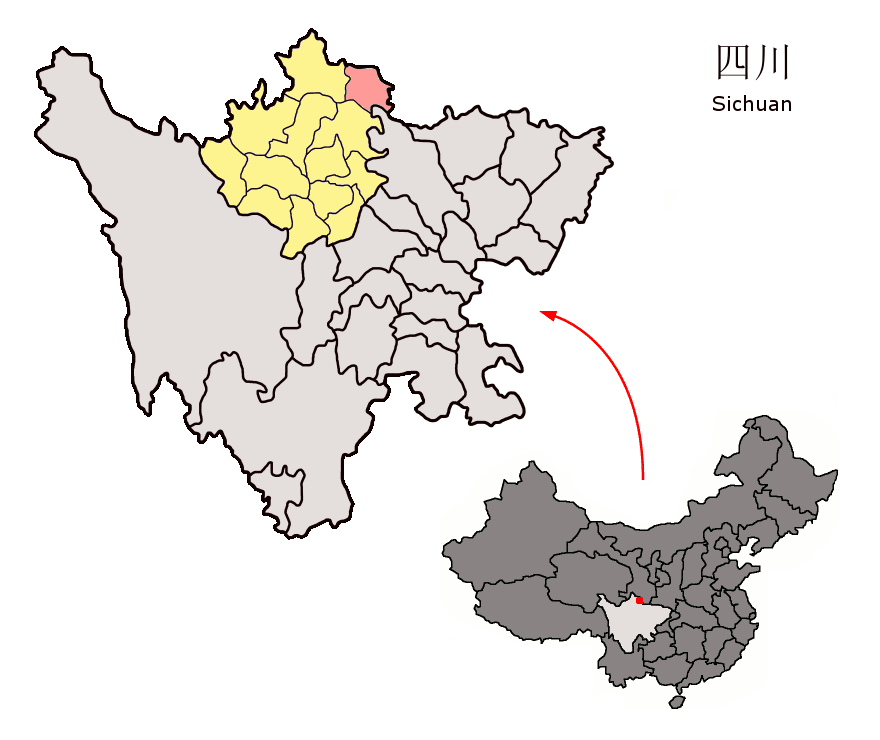
- Location of Jiuzhaigou County (light red) in Ngawa (yellow) and Sichuan (light gray)

- Location of the seat in Sichuan Jiuzhaigou (China)
- Coordinates: 33°16′N 104°14′E
- Country: China
- Province: Sichuan
- Autonomous prefecture: Ngawa
- Seat: Nanping (Nainpin)

Area
  - Total: 5,286 km^{2} (2,041 sq mi)
- Elevation (County seat): 1,400 m (4,600 ft)

Population (2020)
  - Total: 66,055
  - Density: 12.50/km^{2} (32.37/sq mi)
- Time zone: UTC+8 (China Standard)
- Postal code: 623400
- Website: www.jzg.gov.cn

Jiuzhaigou County

Chinese name
- Simplified Chinese: 九寨沟县
- Traditional Chinese: 九寨溝縣
Transcriptions
Standard Mandarin
- Hanyu Pinyin: Jiǔzhàigōu Xiàn

Tibetan name
- Tibetan: གཟི་རྩ་སྡེ་དགུ་རྫོང་།
Transcriptions
- Wylie: gZi rtsa sde dgu rDzong
- Tibetan Pinyin: Sirza Degu Zong

Qiang name
- Qiang: Rrggucua

Jiuzhaigou County (Chinese: 九寨沟县; Tibetan: གཟི་རྩ་སྡེ་དགུ་རྫོང་།; Qiang: Rrggucua) is a county of Sichuan Province, China. It is under the administration of the Ngawa Tibetan and Qiang Autonomous Prefecture. Formerly called Nanping County (南坪县; Nánpíng Xiàn), it was renamed in 1998 to reflect the fact that the Jiuzhaigou Valley is located within its administration. The county seat, Nanping, was created in 2013 by the merger of Yongle Town (永乐镇), Yongfeng Township (永丰乡), and Anle Township (安乐乡).

The county consists of nine villages in a valley in Sichuan Province. The main ethnic group in the county is Han, with the second being Tibetan. The county seat has an altitude of about 1,400 m (4,600 ft). It has a total area of 2,041 square miles (5,286 km^{2}). As of 2015, the county's total population was 67,519.

== Administrative divisions ==
Jiuzhaigou County contains fives towns, seven townships, and two other township-level divisions.

Name	Simplified Chinese	Hanyu Pinyin	Tibetan	Wylie	Administrative division code
Towns
Zhangzha Town (Zangza)	漳扎镇	Zhāngzhā Zhèn	གཙང་རྩ་ཀྲེན།	gtsang rtsa kren	513225101
Nanping Town (Nainpin)	南坪镇	Nánpíng Zhèn	ནན་ཕིན་གྲོང་རྡལ།	nan phin grong rdal	513225102
Shuanghe Town (Shongho)	双河镇	Shuānghé Zhèn	ཧྲོང་ཧོ་གྲོང་རྡལ།	hrong ho grong rdal	513225103
Heihe Town (Hêho)	黑河镇	Hēihé Zhèn	ཧེ་ཧོ་གྲོང་རྡལ།	he ho grong rdal	513225104
Wujiao Town (Wujo)	勿角镇	Wùjiǎo Zhèn	ཝུའུ་ཅོ་གྲོང་རྡལ།	wuvu co grong rdal	513225105
Townships
Yonghe Township (Yungho)	永和乡	Yǒnghé Xiāng	ཡུང་ཧོ་ཞང་།	yung ho zhang	513225201
Baihe Township (Qugar)	白河乡	Báihé Xiāng	ཆུ་དཀར་ཡུལ་ཚོ།	chu dkar yul tsho	513225203
Baohua Township	保华乡	Bǎohuá Xiāng	པའོ་ཧྭ་ཡུལ་ཚོ།	pavo hwa yul tsho	513225205
Guoyuan Township (Goyoin)	郭元乡	Guōyuán Xiāng	ཀོའོ་ཡོན་ཞང་།	kovo yon zhang	513225209
Caodi Township	草地乡	Cǎodì Xiāng	ཚའོ་ཏི་ཡུལ་ཚོ།	tshavo ti yul tsho	513225210
Yuwa Township (Xungpa)	玉瓦乡	Yùwǎ Xiāng	གཞུང་བ་ཡུལ་ཚོ།	gzhung ba yul tsho	513225213
Dalu Township (Daglo)	大录乡	Dàlù Xiāng	སྟག་ལོ་ཞང་།	stag lo zhang	513225214
Other divisions
Jiuzhaigou State Ranch	九寨沟国营牧场	Jiǔzhàigōu Guóyíng Mùchǎng			513225400
Jiuzhaigou Scenic Spot Authority	九寨沟风景名胜管理局	Jiǔzhàigōu Fēngjǐng Míngshèng Guǎnlǐjú			513225401

== Climate ==
Climate data for Jiuzhaigou, elevation 1,441 m (4,728 ft), (1991–2020 normals, extremes 1981–present)
Month	Jan	Feb	Mar	Apr	May	Jun	Jul	Aug	Sep	Oct	Nov	Dec	Year
Record high °C (°F)	17.9 (64.2)	24.0 (75.2)	31.2 (88.2)	34.1 (93.4)	34.9 (94.8)	35.8 (96.4)	37.8 (100.0)	37.4 (99.3)	35.7 (96.3)	27.7 (81.9)	23.7 (74.7)	19.6 (67.3)	37.8 (100.0)
Mean daily maximum °C (°F)	8.0 (46.4)	11.1 (52.0)	15.9 (60.6)	21.3 (70.3)	24.4 (75.9)	27.1 (80.8)	29.4 (84.9)	28.8 (83.8)	23.8 (74.8)	18.7 (65.7)	14.4 (57.9)	9.4 (48.9)	19.4 (66.8)
Daily mean °C (°F)	2.6 (36.7)	5.6 (42.1)	9.8 (49.6)	14.4 (57.9)	17.6 (63.7)	20.5 (68.9)	22.9 (73.2)	22.5 (72.5)	18.5 (65.3)	13.7 (56.7)	8.7 (47.7)	3.6 (38.5)	13.4 (56.1)
Mean daily minimum °C (°F)	−1.8 (28.8)	1.2 (34.2)	5.2 (41.4)	9.3 (48.7)	12.6 (54.7)	15.8 (60.4)	18.4 (65.1)	18.1 (64.6)	14.9 (58.8)	10.2 (50.4)	4.5 (40.1)	−0.9 (30.4)	9.0 (48.1)
Record low °C (°F)	−8.5 (16.7)	−7.1 (19.2)	−6.7 (19.9)	0.2 (32.4)	3.7 (38.7)	8.4 (47.1)	10.3 (50.5)	8.9 (48.0)	5.9 (42.6)	−1.5 (29.3)	−3.7 (25.3)	−8.6 (16.5)	−8.6 (16.5)
Average precipitation mm (inches)	2.1 (0.08)	4.1 (0.16)	21.0 (0.83)	51.0 (2.01)	85.9 (3.38)	79.2 (3.12)	82.9 (3.26)	80.8 (3.18)	75.8 (2.98)	59.3 (2.33)	9.0 (0.35)	0.6 (0.02)	551.7 (21.7)
Average precipitation days (≥ 0.1 mm)	3.3	3.8	10.8	14.0	17.6	17.1	15.1	13.6	15.0	16.0	6.0	1.2	133.5
Average snowy days	7.5	4.4	1.4	0.2	0	0	0	0	0	0	0.5	2.7	16.7
Average relative humidity (%)	54	54	57	60	65	68	69	69	73	73	64	56	64
Mean monthly sunshine hours	141.3	127.1	138.1	149.2	155.5	141.1	164.0	157.6	106.1	114.5	137.0	142.2	1,673.7
Percentage possible sunshine	44	41	37	38	36	33	38	38	29	33	44	46	38
Source: China Meteorological Administration all-time extreme temperature

== Economy ==
The economy of Jiuzhaigou County primarily depends on tourism. In 2023 it totalled RMB 7.2 billion in revenue from 7 million tourists, accounting for 78.5% of the local income.

Jiuzhaigou produces four designated origin agricultural products: Jiuzhaigou persimmon, Jiuzhaigou honey, Jiuzhai Daodang (Codonopsis) and Jiuzhai pork. Other notable products are Jiuzhaigou sweet cherries and Cordyceps mushroom.

The industrial output mainly concerns (hydro)power generation and gold mining.
