= List of Sichuan Airlines destinations =

Sichuan Airlines serves the following destinations (as of September 2023).

== List ==
| Hub |
| Focus city |
| Cargo |
| Seasonal |
| Future route |
| Terminated route |

| City | State/province | Country | IATA | ICAO | Airport | Notes |
|---|---|---|---|---|---|---|
| Athens | — | Greece | ATH | LGAV | Athens International Airport | |
| Auckland | Auckland Region | New Zealand | AKL | NZAA | Auckland International Airport | |
| Bangalore | Karnataka | India | BLR | VOBL | Kempegowda International Airport | |
| Bangkok | Central Thailand | Thailand | BKK | VTBS | Suvarnabhumi International Airport | |
| Beijing | Beijing | China | PEK | ZBAA | Beijing Capital International Airport | |
| Brussels | Brussels-Capital Region | Belgium | BRU | EBBR | Brussels Airport | |
| Cairo | Cairo Governorate | Egypt | CAI | HECA | Cairo International Airport | |
| Cebu | Cebu | Philippines | CEB | RPVM | Mactan–Cebu International Airport | |
| Changsha | Hunan | China | CSX | ZGHA | Changsha Huanghua International Airport | |
| Changzhou | Jiangsu | China | CZX | ZSCG | Changzhou Benniu International Airport | |
| Chengdu | Sichuan | China | CTU | ZUUU | Chengdu Shuangliu International Airport | |
| Chengdu | Sichuan | China | TFU | ZUTF | Chengdu Tianfu International Airport | |
| Chennai | Tamil Nadu | India | MAA | VOMM | Chennai International Airport | |
| Chiang Mai | Chiang Mai Province | Thailand | CNX | VTCC | Chiang Mai International Airport | |
| Chiang Rai | Chiang Rai Province | Thailand | CEI | VTCT | Chiang Rai International Airport | |
| Chongqing | Chongqing | China | CKG | ZUCK | Chongqing Jiangbei International Airport | |
| Da Nang | South Central Coast | Vietnam | DAD | VVDN | Da Nang International Airport | |
| Dalian | Liaoning | China | DLC | ZYTL | Dalian Zhoushuizi International Airport | |
| Dehong | Yunnan | China | LUM | ZPLX | Dehong Mangshi Airport | |
| Delhi | NCR | India | DEL | VOMM | Indira Gandhi International Airport | |
| Denpasar | Bali | Indonesia | DPS | WADD | Ngurah Rai International Airport | |
| Dubai | Emirate of Dubai | United Arab Emirates | DXB | OMDB | Dubai International Airport | |
| Fuzhou | Fujian | China | FOC | ZSFZ | Fuzhou Changle International Airport | |
| Guangzhou | Guangdong | China | CAN | ZGGG | Guangzhou Baiyun International Airport | |
| Guilin | Guangxi | China | KWL | ZGKL | Guilin Liangjiang International Airport | |
| Guiyang | Guizhou | China | KWE | ZUGY | Guiyang Longdongbao International Airport | |
| Haikou | Hainan | China | HAK | ZJHK | Haikou Meilan International Airport | |
| Hangzhou | Zhejiang | China | HGH | ZSHC | Hangzhou Xiaoshan International Airport | |
| Hanoi | Hanoi Capital Region | Vietnam | HAN | VVNB | Noi Bai International Airport | |
| Harbin | Heilongjiang | China | HRB | ZYHB | Harbin Taiping International Airport | |
| Hefei | Anhui | China | HFE | ZSOF | Hefei Xinqiao International Airport | |
| Helsinki | Vantaa | Finland | HEL | EFHK | Helsinki Airport | |
| Ho Chi Minh City | TPHCM | Vietnam | SGN | VVTS | Tan Son Nhat International Airport | |
| Hohhot | Inner Mongolia | China | HET | ZBHH | Hohhot Baita International Airport | |
| Hong Kong | Hong Kong | Hong Kong | HKG | VHHH | Hong Kong International Airport | |
| Istanbul | Marmara Region | Turkey | IST | LTFM | Istanbul Airport | |
| Jakarta | Banten | Indonesia | CGK | WIII | Soekarno–Hatta International Airport | |
| Jinan | Shandong | China | TNA | ZSJN | Jinan Yaoqiang International Airport | |
| Jinghong | Yunnan | China | JHG | ZPJH | Xishuangbanna Gasa Airport | |
| Jiuzhaigou | Sichuan | China | JZH | ZUJZ | Jiuzhai Huanglong Airport | |
| Kalibo | Aklan | Philippines | KLO | RPVK | Kalibo International Airport | |
| Kathmandu | Bagmati Province | Nepal | KTM | VNKT | Tribhuvan International Airport | |
| Krabi | Krabi Province | Thailand | KBV | VTSG | Krabi International Airport | |
| Kuala Lumpur | Selangor | Malaysia | KUL | WMKK | Kuala Lumpur International Airport | |
| Kunming | Yunnan | China | KMG | ZPPP | Kunming Changshui International Airport | |
| Kunming | Yunnan | China | ~~KMG~~ | ~~ZPPP~~ | Kunming Wujiaba International Airport | |
| Lanzhou | Gansu | China | LHW | ZLLL | Lanzhou Zhongchuan International Airport | |
| Lhasa | Tibet | China | LXA | ZULS | Lhasa Gonggar Airport | |
| Lijiang | Yunnan | China | LJG | ZPLJ | Lijiang Sanyi International Airport | |
| Los Angeles | California | United States | LAX | KLAX | Los Angeles International Airport | |
| Madrid | Community of Madrid | Spain | MAD | LEMD | Madrid–Barajas Airport | |
| Malé | Malé | Maldives | MLE | VRMM | Velana International Airport | |
| Melbourne | Victoria | Australia | MEL | YMML | Melbourne Airport | |
| Mandalay | Mandalay | Myanmar | MDL | VYMY | Mandalay International Airport | |
| Mianyang | Sichuan | China | MIG | ZUMY | Mianyang Nanjiao Airport | |
| Moscow | Moscow Oblast / Moscow Federal City | Russia | SVO | UUEE | Sheremetyevo International Airport | |
| Muan | South Jeolla Province | South Korea | MWX | RKJB | Muan International Airport | |
| Mumbai | Maharashtra | India | BOM | VABB | Chhatrapati Shivaji Maharaj International Airport | |
| Nanchang | Jiangxi | China | KHN | ZSNJ | Nanchang Changbei International Airport | |
| Nanjing | Jiangsu | China | NKG | ZSCN | Nanjing Lukou International Airport | |
| Nanning | Guangxi | China | NNG | ZGNN | Nanning Wuxu International Airport | |
| Nantong | Jiangsu | China | NTG | ZSNT | Nantong Xingdong International Airport | |
| Nha Trang | Khánh Hòa province | Vietnam | CXR | VVCR | Cam Ranh International Airport | |
| Ningbo | Zhejiang | China | NBG | ZSNB | Ningbo Lishe International Airport | |
| Osaka | Ōsaka-fū | Japan | KIX | RJBB | Kansai International Airport | |
| Prague | Capital city of Prague | Czech Republic | PRG | LKPR | Václav Havel Airport Prague | |
| Qingdao | Shandong | China | TAO | ZSQD | Qingdao Jiaodong International Airport | |
| Qingdao | Shandong | China | ~~TAO~~ | ~~ZSQD~~ | Qingdao Liuting International Airport | |
| Rome | Lazio | Italy | FCO | LIRF | Leonardo da Vinci–Fiumicino Airport | |
| Saint Petersburg | Leningrad Oblast / St Petersburg Federal City | Russia | LED | ULLI | Pulkovo Airport | |
| Saipan | — | Northern Mariana Islands | SPN | PGSN | Saipan International Airport | |
| Sapporo | Hokkaido | Japan | CTS | RJCC | New Chitose Airport | |
| Sanya | Hainan | China | SYX | ZJSY | Sanya Phoenix International Airport | |
| Seoul | Seoul Capital Area | South Korea | ICN | RKSI | Incheon International Airport | |
| Shanghai | Shanghai | China | SHA | ZSSS | Shanghai Hongqiao International Airport | |
| Shanghai | Shanghai | China | PVG | ZSPD | Shanghai Pudong International Airport | |
| Shenyang | Liaoning | China | SHE | ZYTX | Shenyang Taoxian International Airport | |
| Shenzhen | Guangdong | China | SZX | ZGSZ | Shenzhen Bao'an International Airport | |
| Shijiazhuang | Hebei | China | SJW | ZBSJ | Shijiazhuang Zhengding International Airport | |
| Singapore | — | Singapore | SIN | WSSS | Changi Airport | |
| Sydney | New South Wales | Australia | SYD | YSSY | Sydney Airport | |
| Taichung | Taichung | Taiwan | RMQ | RCMQ | Taichung International Airport | |
| Taipei | Taipei | Taiwan | TSA | RCSS | Songshan Airport | |
| Taipei | Taoyuan | Taiwan | TPE | RCTP | Taoyuan International Airport | |
| Taiyuan | Shanxi | China | TYN | ZBYN | Taiyuan Wusu International Airport | |
| Tel Aviv | Tel Aviv District | Israel | TLV | LLBG | Ben Gurion Airport | |
| Tianjin | Tianjin | China | TSN | ZBTJ | Tianjin Binhai International Airport | |
| Tokyo | Tōkyō-to | Japan | NRT | RJAA | Narita International Airport | |
| Ürümqi | Xinjiang | China | URC | ZWWW | Ürümqi Diwopu International Airport | |
| Vancouver | British Columbia | Canada | YVR | CYVR | Vancouver International Airport | |
| Vladivostok | Primorsky Krai | Russia | VVO | UHWW | Vladivostok International Airport | |
| Wanzhou | Chongqing | China | WXN | ZUWX | Wanzhou Wuqiao Airport | |
| Wenzhou | Zhejiang | China | WNZ | ZSWZ | Wenzhou Longwan International Airport | |
| Wuhan | Hubei | China | WUH | ZHHH | Wuhan Tianhe International Airport | |
| Xi'an | Shaanxi | China | XIY | ZLXY | Xi'an Xianyang International Airport | |
| Xiamen | Fujian | China | XMN | ZSAM | Xiamen Gaoqi International Airport | |
| Xichang | Sichuan | China | XIC | ZUXC | Xichang Qingshan Airport | |
| Xining | Qinghai | China | XNN | ZLXN | Xining Caojiabao International Airport | |
| Xuzhou | Jiangsu | China | XUZ | ZSXZ | Xuzhou Guanyin International Airport | |
| Yangon | Yangon | Myanmar | RGN | VYYY | Yangon International Airport | |
| Yichang | Hubei | China | YIH | ZHYC | Yichang Sanxia Airport | |
| Yinchuan | Ningxia | China | INC | ZLIC | Yinchuan Hedong International Airport | |
| Zhangjiajie | Hunan | China | DYG | ZGDY | Zhangjiajie Hehua International Airport | |
| Zhanjiang | Guangdong | China | ZHA | ZGJZ | Zhanjiang Airport | |
| Zhengzhou | Henan | China | CGO | ZHCC | Zhengzhou Xinzheng International Airport | |
| Zürich | Canton of Zürich | Switzerland | ZRH | LSZH | Zurich Airport | |
