= Pearl Shoal Waterfall =

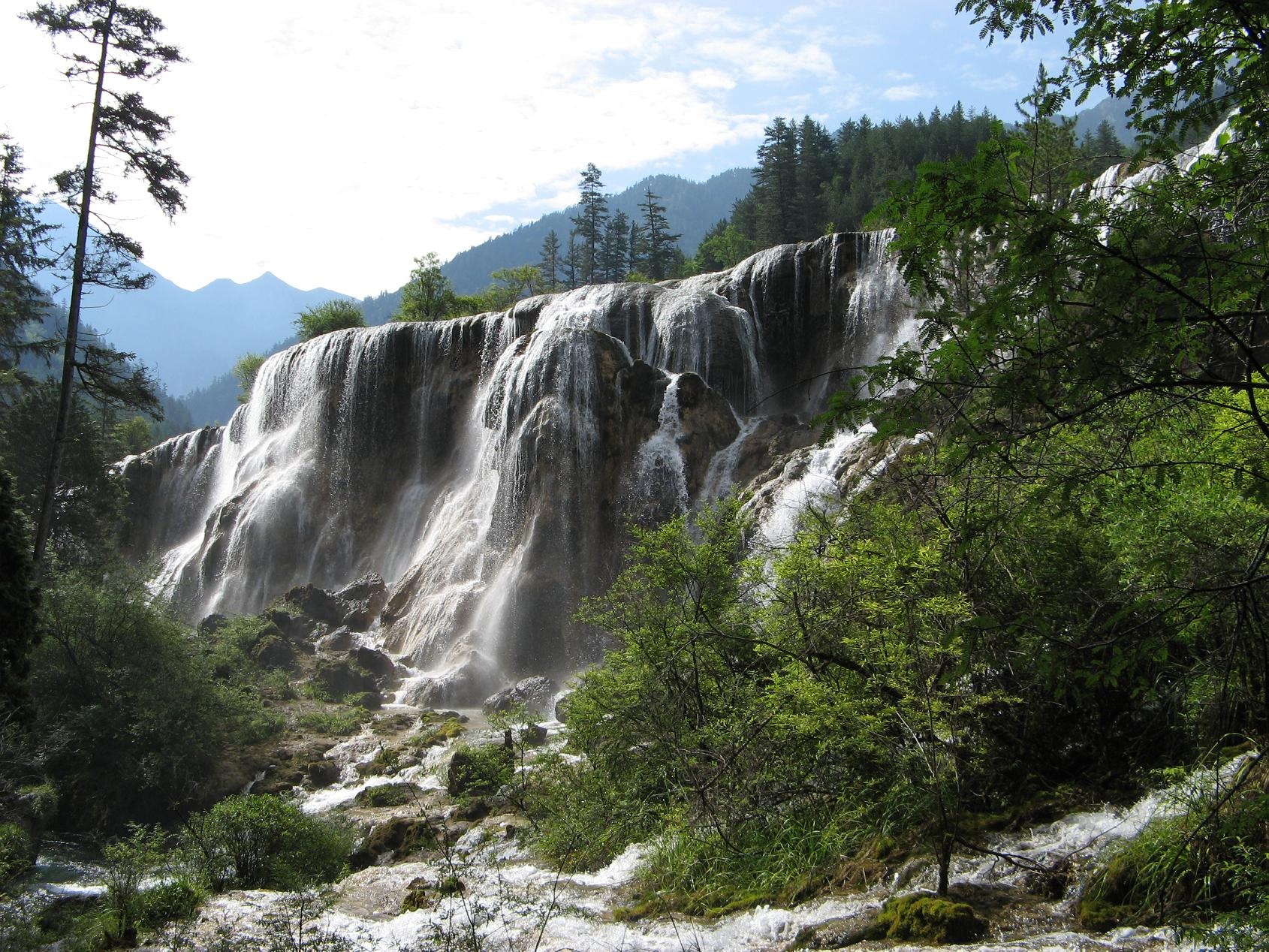
- Pearl Shoal Waterfall

- Location within Sichuan Location within China
- Coordinates: 33°10′07″N 103°53′06″E
- Elevation: 2,433 metres (7,982 ft)
- Total height: 40 metres (130 ft)
- Total width: 310 metres (1,020 ft)

Pearl Shoal Waterfall (Chinese: 珍珠滩瀑布; pinyin: Zhēnzhū tān pùbù) is a waterfall located in Jiuzhaigou, Aba-Ngawa Tibetan and Qiang Autonomous Prefecture in northern Sichuan Province, China. Located at an altitude of 2,433 metres (7,982 ft), the top of the waterfall is 310 metres (1,020 ft) in width. It has a fall of 40 metres (130 ft). The waterfall exists on one of the tributaries of the Bailong River.

== Gallery ==
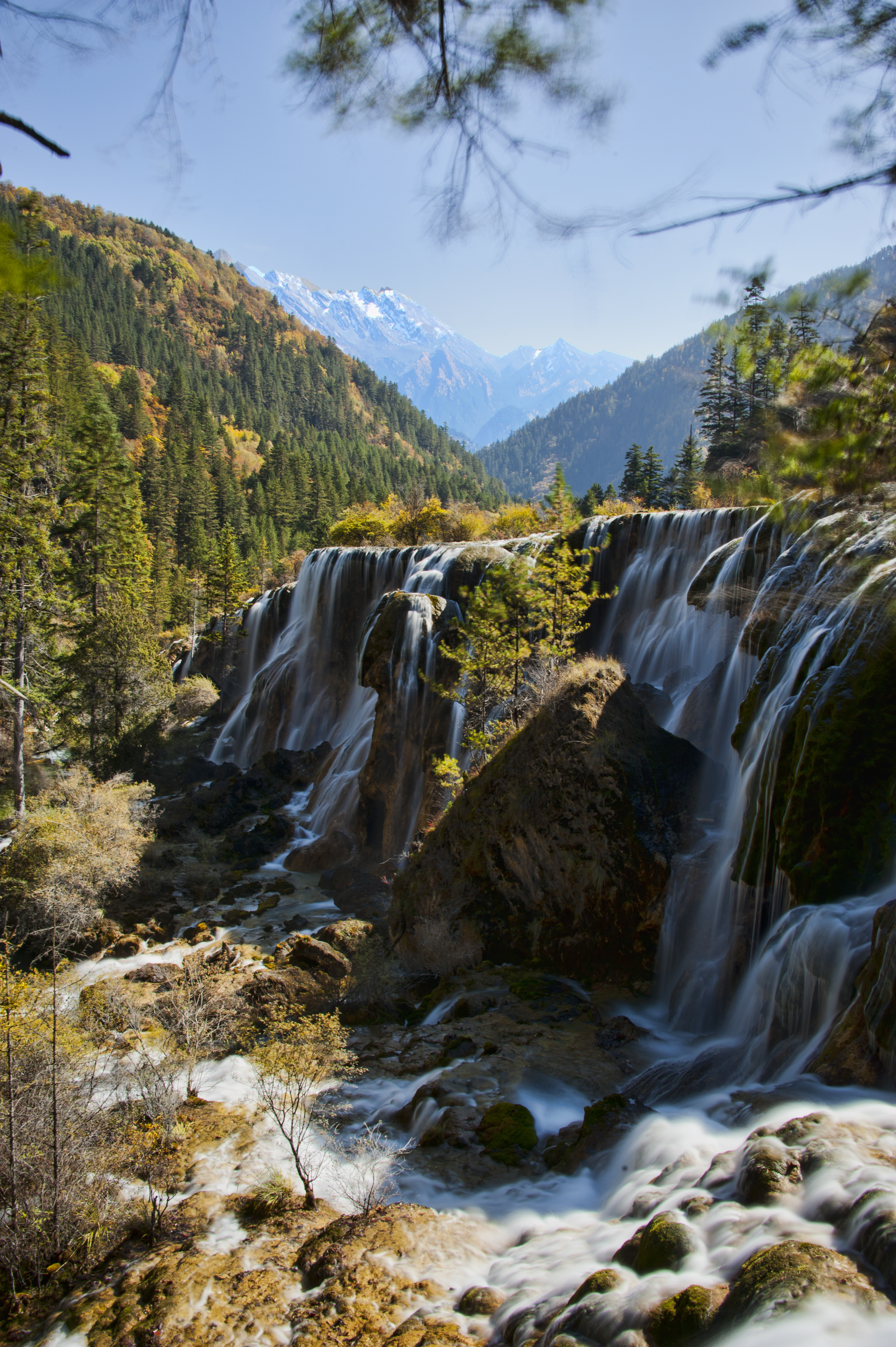
The Pearl Shoal Waterfall

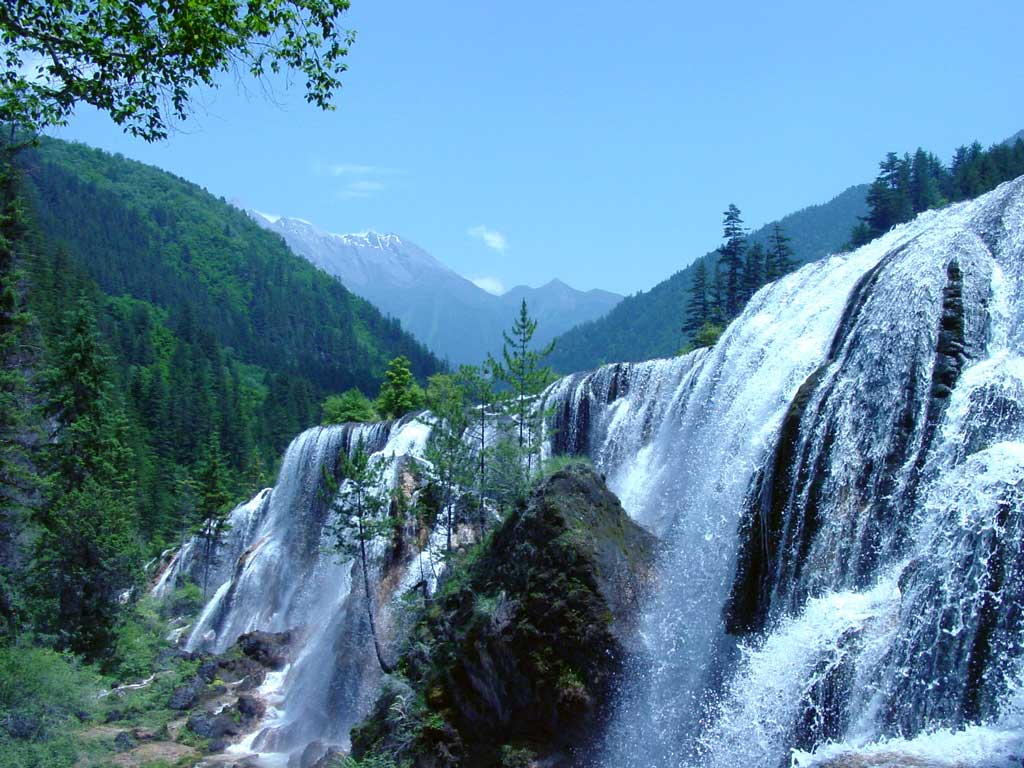
The Pearl Shoal Waterfall

== See also ==
- Aba, Sichuan
- List of waterfalls
