= Jiuzhaigou =

Nature reserve and national park in Sichuan, China

Jiuzhaigou Valley Scenic and Historic Interest Area 九寨沟风景名胜区
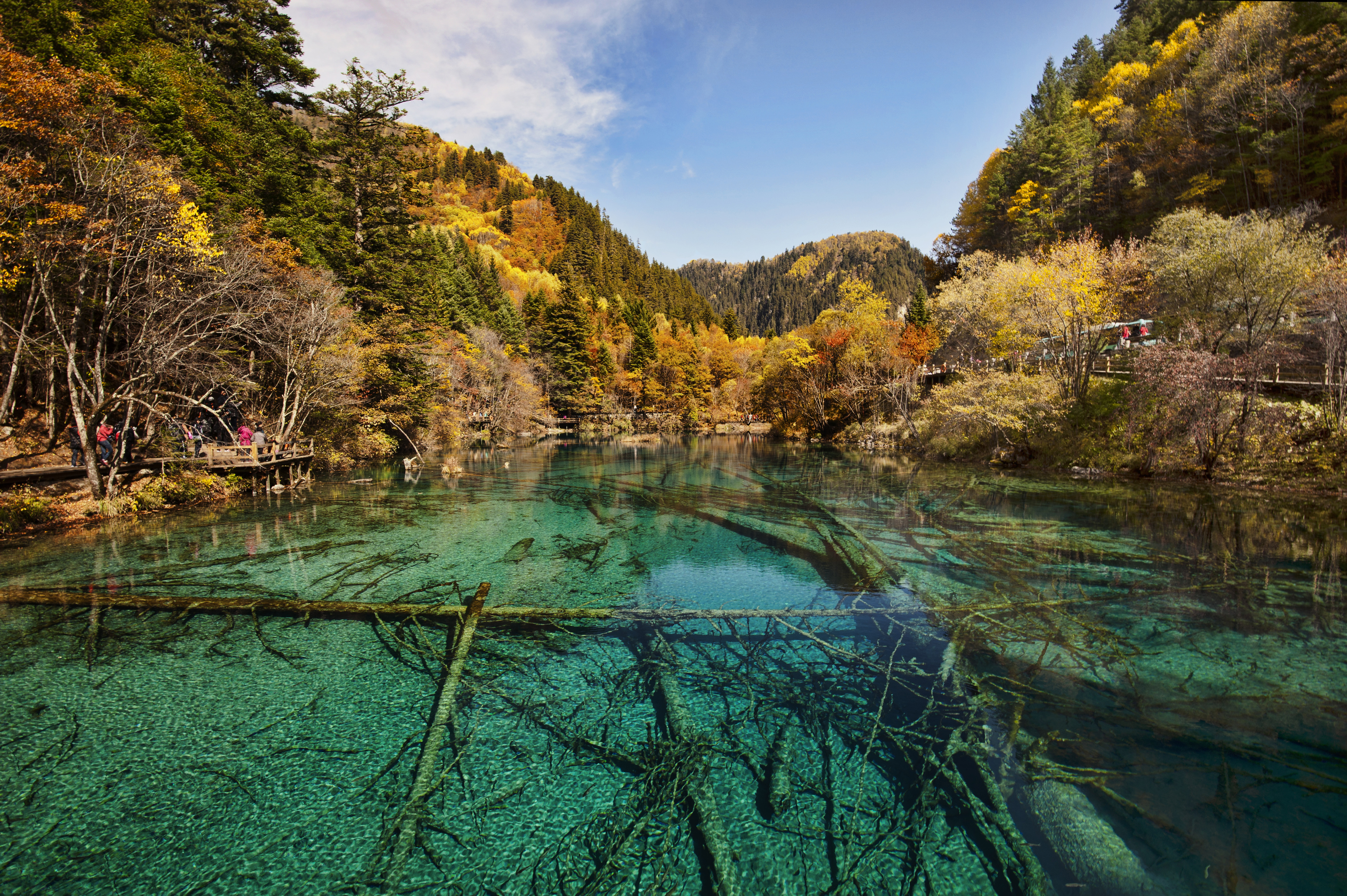
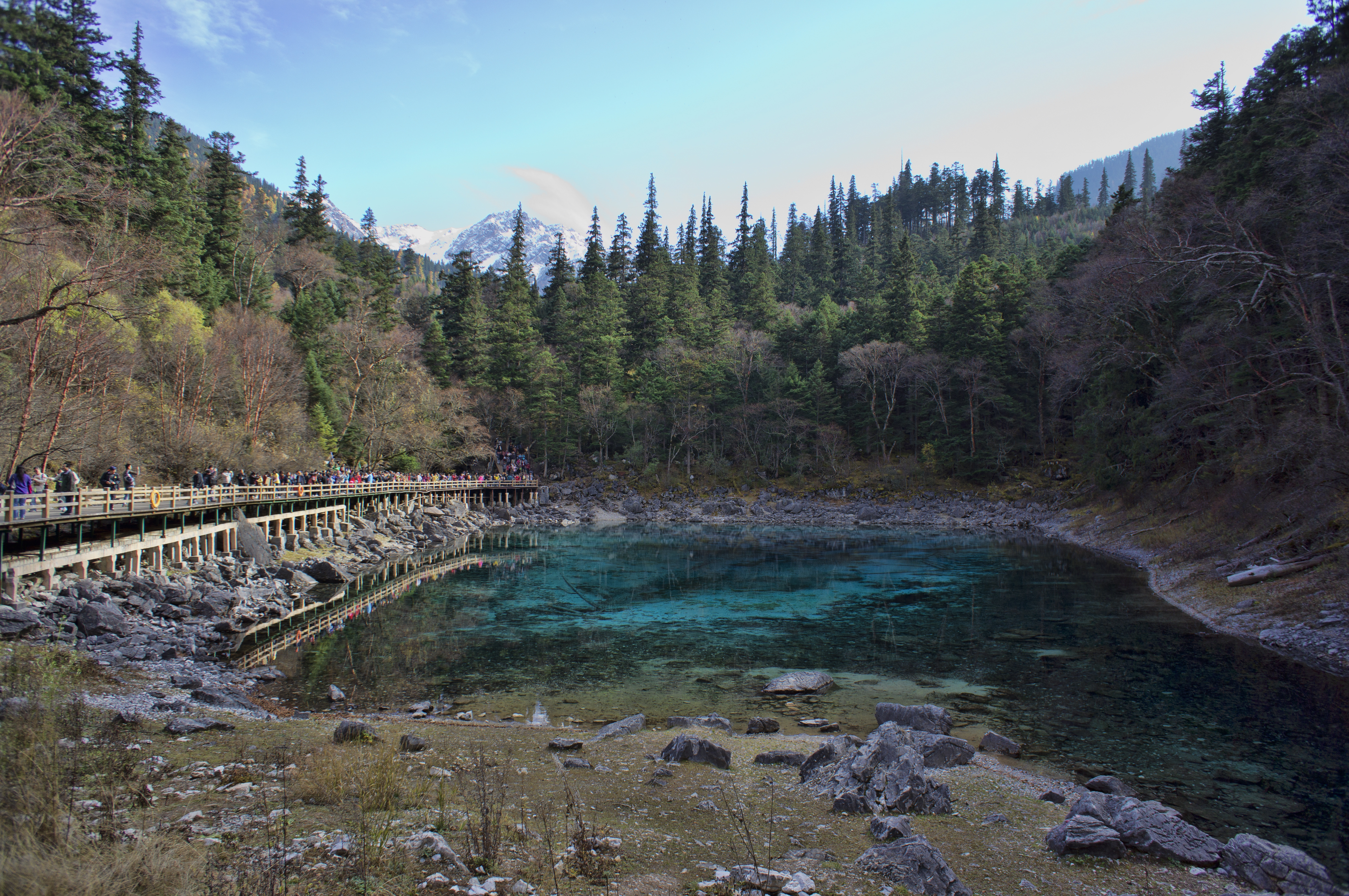
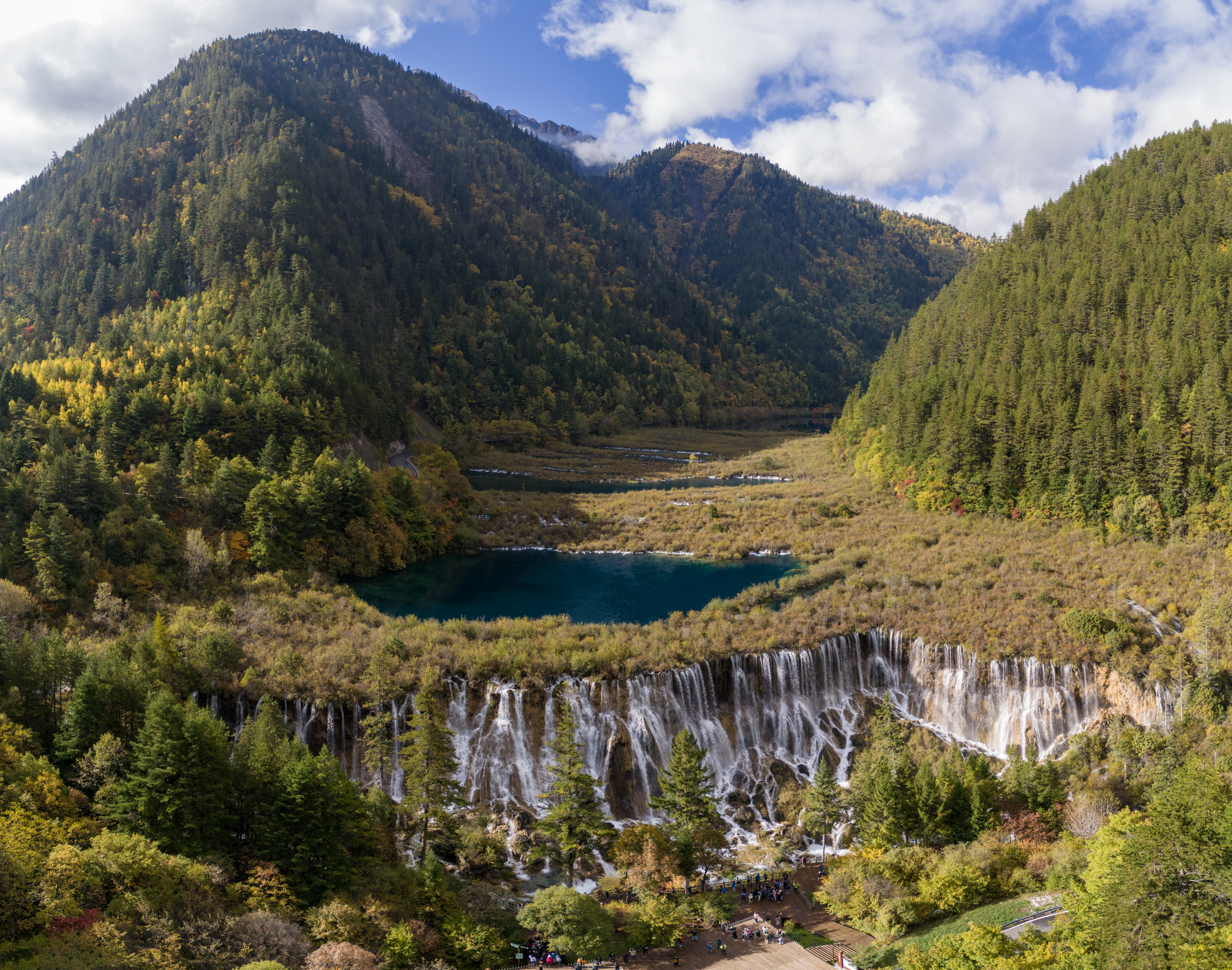
- From top, left to right: Five Flower Lake, Five Colour Pond, Nuorilang Falls, Pearl Shoal Falls

- Location within Sichuan
- Location: Jiuzhaigou County, Sichuan
- Nearest city: Songpan
- Coordinates: 33°12′N 103°54′E
- Area: 720 km^{2} (280 sq mi)
- Established: 1978
- Visitors: 1,190,000 (in 2002)
- Governing body: Sichuan Provincial Commission for Construction

UNESCO World Heritage Site
- Criteria: Natural: (vii)
- Reference: 637
- Inscription: 1992 (16th Session)
- Area: 72,000 ha (280 sq mi)

Jiuzhaigou
- "Valley of Nine Fortified Villages (Jiuzhaigou)" in Simplified Chinese (top), Traditional Chinese (middle), and Tibetan (bottom) characters

Chinese name
- Simplified Chinese: 九寨沟
- Traditional Chinese: 九寨溝
- Literal meaning: "Valley of Nine Fortified Villages"
Transcriptions
Standard Mandarin
- Hanyu Pinyin: Jiǔzhàigōu
- Wade–Giles: Chiu^{3}-chai^{4}-kou^{1}
- IPA: [tɕjòʊ.ʈʂâɪ.kóʊ]

Tibetan name
- Tibetan: གཟི་རྩ་སྡེ་དགུ།
Transcriptions
- Wylie: gzi-rtsa sde-dgu
- Tibetan Pinyin: Sirza Degu

Jiuzhaigou ([tɕjòʊ.ʈʂâɪ.kóʊ]; Chinese: 九寨沟; pinyin: Jiǔzhàigōu) is a nature reserve and national park located in the north of Sichuan Province in southwestern China. A long valley running north to south, Jiuzhaigou was inscribed by UNESCO as a World Heritage Site in 1992 and a World Biosphere Reserve in 1997. It belongs to the category V (Protected Landscape) in the IUCN system of protected area categorization.

The Jiuzhaigou valley is part of the Min Mountains on the edge of the Tibetan Plateau and stretches over 72,000 hectares (180,000 acres). It has an altitude of over 4800 meters and is composed of a series of diverse forest ecosystems. It is known for its many multi-level waterfalls, colorful lakes, and snow-capped peaks. Its elevation ranges from 2,000 to 4,500 metres (6,600 to 14,800 ft). The Jiuzhaigou area borders the Minshan Garna Peak in the south, and the Huanglong Scenic Area is to Jiuzhaigou's north. It originates from the Baishui River area, one of the headwaters of the Jialing River and a part of the Yangtze River system.

== History ==
Jiuzhaigou (literally "Nine Settlement Valley") takes its name from the nine Tibetan settlements along its length.

The remote region was inhabited by various Tibetan and Qiang peoples for centuries. Until 1975 this inaccessible area was little known. In 1975, famous forestry scientist Wu Zhonglun conducted a comprehensive survey of Jiuzhaigou. He was deeply moved, saying "I have visited several countries in Europe and America, but I have never seen such breathtaking natural beauty. It must be well protected." He then wrote to the Sichuan Provincial People's Government and the Sichuan Provincial Forestry Department, urging local authorities to protect the natural landscape and prohibit the indiscriminate logging of trees. The Sichuan Provincial Forestry Department promptly issued a notice stating that logging must be restricted beyond 200 meters in the Zechawa and Rize gullies of Jiuzhaigou. The Sichuan Provincial Government subsequently prioritized the protection of Jiuzhaigou, directing relevant departments and research institutes to develop a detailed conservation plan and completely halting logging in the valley. In 1980, the Jiuzhaigou Nature Reserve was established.

An Administration Bureau was established and the site officially opened to tourism in 1984; layout of facilities and regulations were completed in 1987. The site was inscribed by UNESCO as a World Heritage Site in 1992 and a World Biosphere Reserve in 1997. The tourism area is classified as a AAAAA scenic area by the China National Tourism Administration.

=== Visitor numbers ===
Since opening, tourist activity has increased every year: from 5,000 in 1984 to 170,000 in 1991, 160,000 in 1995, to 200,000 in 1997, including about 3,000 foreigners. Visitors numbered 1,190,000 in 2002. In 2004, the site averaged 7,000 visits per day, with a quota of 12,000 being reportedly enforced during high season. In 2024 the site welcomed 5.11 million tourists, with over 30,000 per day during the peak season during the end of July and start of August. A limit of 41,000 daily visitors is enforced by requiring timed tickets. The town of Zhangzha at the exit of the valley and the nearby Songpan County feature an ever-increasing number of hotels, including several luxury five-stars, such as Sheraton.

The site has become more accessible with mass transport due to the opening of the Sichuan–Qinghai railway and Jiuzhai Huanglong Airport. Developments related to mass tourism in the region have caused concerns about the impact on the environment around the park.

=== 2017 earthquake ===
In August 2017, a magnitude 7.0 earthquake struck Jiuzhaigou County, causing significant structural damage. The authorities closed the valley to tourists until March 3, 2018, before reopening the park with limited access.

The Jiuzhaigou earthquake in Sichuan, China had a significant impact on the scenic area. The earthquake also resulted in the damage and breakage of two natural dams, namely the Nuorilang Waterfall dam and the Huohua Lake dam.

The Nuorilang Waterfall suffered damage due to its initial low stability and topographic effects. The dam was composed of poor material with low mechanical strength, making it prone to rockfalls even during non-earthquake periods. The nearly vertical structure of the dam amplified the seismic influences at its upper part, increasing the likelihood of deformation and collapse.

The Jiuzhaigou earthquake caused the Huohua Lake dam to break. After the dam broke, the water discharge increased from the normal level of 9.3 m^{3}/s to a maximum of 21.5 m^{3}/s. As a result, the water level rapidly descended, leading to collapses along the dam.

== Population ==
Seven of the nine Tibetan villages are still populated today. The main agglomerations that are readily accessible to tourists are Heye, Shuzheng and Zechawa along the main paths that cater to tourists, selling various handicrafts, souvenirs and snacks. There is also Rexi in the smaller Zaru Valley and behind Heye village are Jianpan, Panya and Yana villages. Guodu and Hejiao villages are no longer populated. Penbu, Panxing and Yongzhu villages lie along the road that passes through the town of Jiuzhaigou/Zhangza outside the valley.

In 2003, the permanent population of the valley was about 1,000 comprising 112 families, and due to the protected nature of the park, agriculture is no longer permitted so the locals now rely on tourism and local government subsidies to make a living.

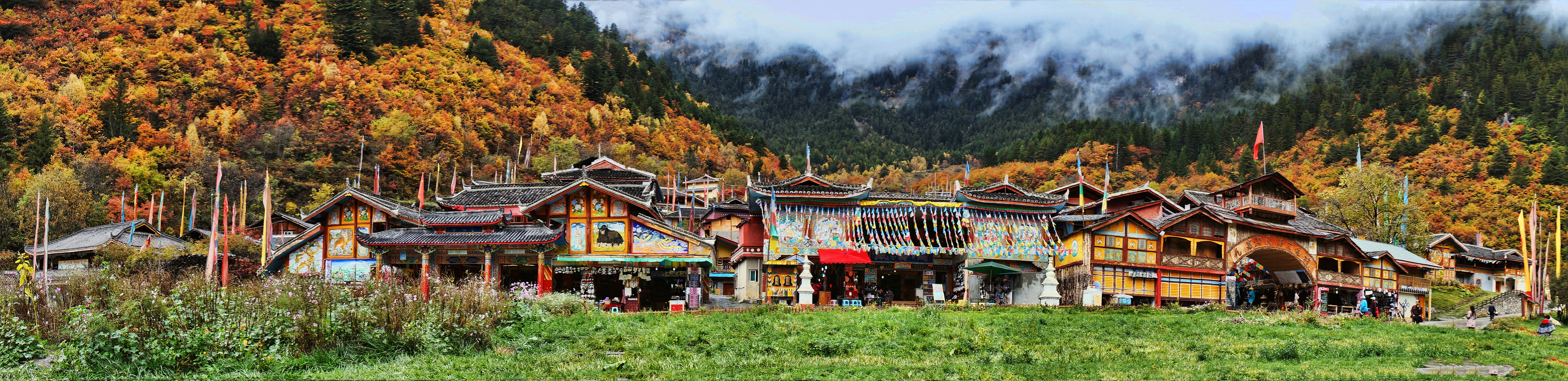
Panorama of Shuzheng Village, the busiest Tibetan village in the valley

== Geography and climate ==
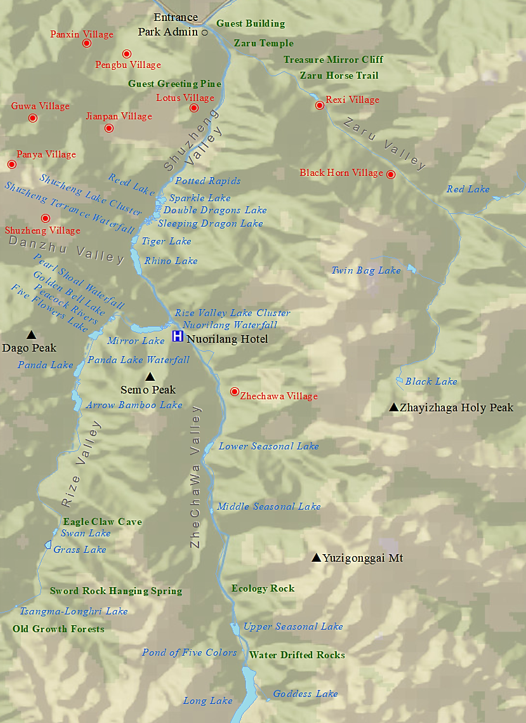
Map of Jiuzhaigou

Jiuzhaigou lies at the southern end of the Minshan mountain range, 330 km (205 mi) north of the provincial capital of Chengdu. It is part of the Jiuzhaigou County (formerly Nanping County) in the Aba Tibetan Qiang Autonomous Prefecture of northwestern Sichuan province, near the Gansu border.

The valley covers 720 km^{2} (278 sq mi), with buffer zones covering an additional 600 km^{2} (232 sq mi). Its elevation, depending on the area considered, ranges from 1,998 to 2,140 m (at the mouth of Shuzheng Gully) to 4,558-4,764 m (on Mount Ganzigonggai at the top of Zechawa Gully).

The climate is subtropical to temperate monsoon with a mean annual temperature of 7.8 °C, with means of −3.7 °C in January and 16.8 °C in July. Total annual rainfall is 761 mm but in the cloud forest it is at least 1,000 mm. 80% of rainfall occurs between May and October. Due to the monsoon moving towards the valley, summer is mild, cloudy, and moderately humid. Above an altitude of 3500 meters, the climate is colder and drier.

== Ecology ==
Jiuzhaigou's ecosystem is classified as temperate broad-leaf forest and woodlands, with mixed mountain and highland systems. Nearly 300 km^{2} (116 sq mi) of the core scenic area are covered by virgin mixed forests. Those forests take on attractive (vibrant) yellow, orange and red hues in the autumn, making that season a popular one for visitors. They are home to a number of plant species of interest, such as endemic varieties of rhododendron and bamboo.

Local fauna includes the endangered giant panda and golden snub-nosed monkey. Both populations are very small (fewer than 20 individuals for the pandas) and isolated. Their survival is in question in a valley subject to increasing tourism. It is one of only three known locations for the threatened Duke of Bedford's vole. Jiuzhaigou is also home to approximately 140 bird species.

The region is indeed a natural museum for mountain karst hydrology and research. It preserves a series of important forest ecosystems, including ancient forests that provide important habitats for many endangered animal and plant species such as giant pandas and antelopes. Jiuzhaigou Valley Scenic and Historic Interest Area also contains a large number of well preserved Quaternary glacial relics, which are of great scenic value.

== Geology and hydrology ==
Jiuzhaigou's landscape is made up of high-altitude karsts shaped by glacial, hydrological and tectonic activity. It lies on major faults on the diverging belt between the Qinghai-Tibet Plate and the Yangtze Plate, and earthquakes have also shaped the landscape. The rock strata are mostly made up of carbonate rocks such dolomite and tufa, as well as some sandstone and shales.

The region contains a large amount of tuff, which is a type of limestone formed by the rapid precipitation of calcium carbonate in freshwater. It falls on rocks, lake beds, and even fallen trees in the water, sometimes accumulating into terraces, shoals, and dam barriers in the lake.

The valley includes the catchment area of three gullies (which due to their large size are often called valleys themselves), and is one of the sources of the Jialing River via the Bailong River, part of the Yangtze River system.

Jiuzhaigou's best-known feature is its dozens of blue, green and turquoise-colored lakes. The local Tibetan people call them Haizi in Chinese, meaning "son of the sea". Originating in glacial activity, they were dammed by rockfalls and other natural phenomena, then solidified by processes of carbonate deposition. Some lakes have a high concentration of calcium carbonate, and their water is very clear so that the bottom is often visible even at high depths. The lakes vary in color and aspect according to their depths, residues, and surroundings. Some of the less stable dams and formations have been artificially reinforced, and direct contact with the lakes or other features is forbidden to tourists.

== Notable features ==
Jiuzhaigou is composed of three valleys arranged in a Y shape. The Rize and Zechawa valleys flow from the south and meet at the centre of the site where they form the Shuzheng valley, flowing north to the mouth of the valley. The mountainous watersheds of these gullies are lined with 55 km (34 mi) of roads for shuttle buses, as well as wooden boardwalks and small pavilions. The boardwalks are typically located on the opposite side of the lakes from the road, shielding them from disturbance by passing buses.

Most visitors will first take the shuttle bus to the end of Rize and/or Shuzheng gully, then make their way back downhill by foot on the boardwalks, taking the bus instead when the next site is too distant. Here is a summary of the sites found in each of the gullies:

=== Rize Valley ===
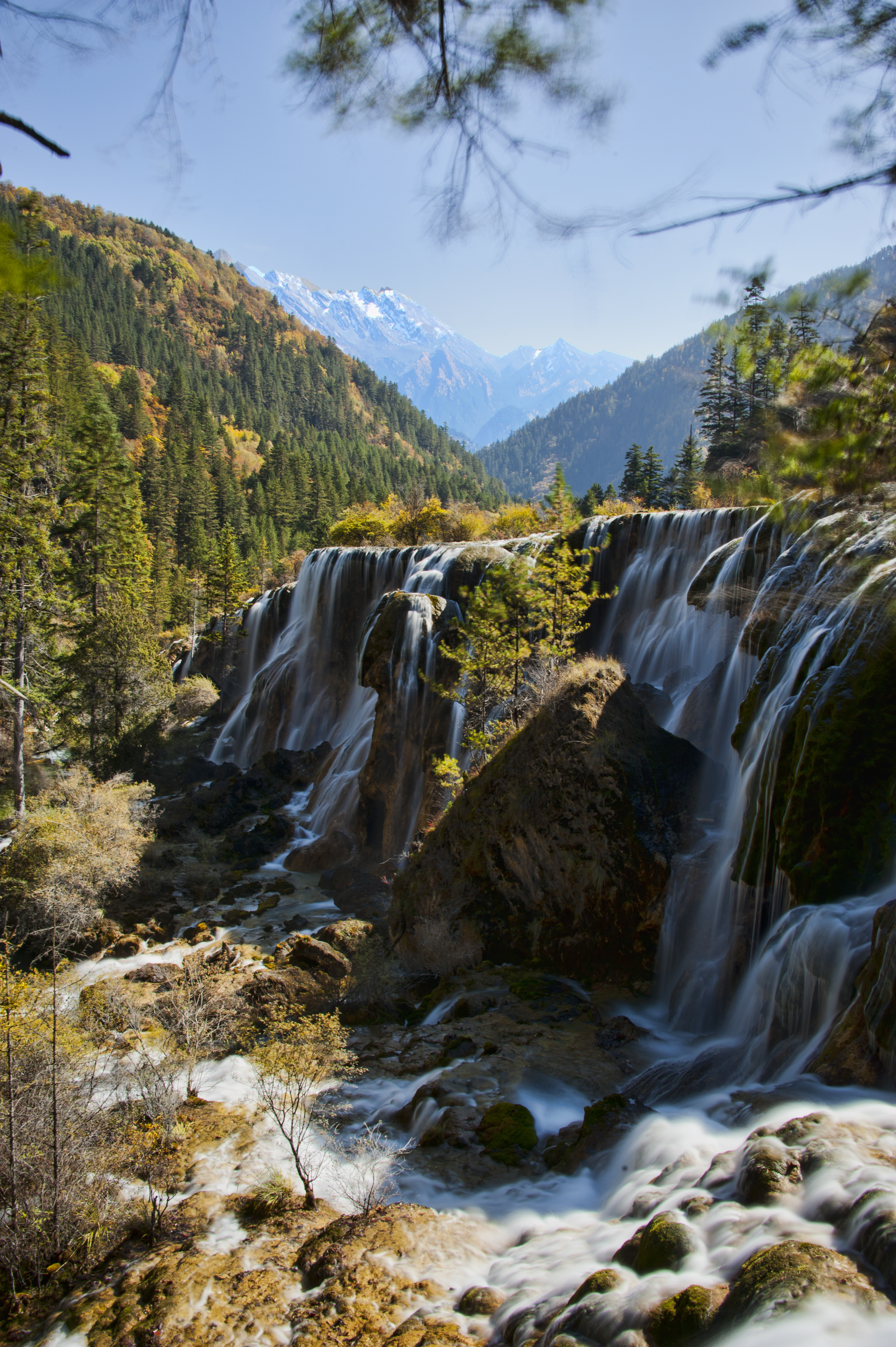
The Pearl Shoal Waterfall is a 310-metre-wide curtain of water

The 18-kilometre-long (11 mi) Rize Valley (日则沟, pinyin: Rìzé Gōu) is the south-western branch of Jiuzhaigou. It contains the largest variety of sites and is typically visited first. Going downhill from its highest point, one passes the following sites:

- The Primeval Forest (原始森林 Yuánshǐ Sēnlín) is a preserved ancient woodland. It is fronted by views of the surrounding mountains and cliffs, including the 500-metre-high, blade-shaped Sword Rock (剑岩 Jiàn Yán).
- Swan Lake (天鹅海, Tiān'é Hǎi) is a 2250-metre-long, 125-metre-wide lake named for its visiting swans and ducks.
- Grass Lake (草海, Cǎo Hǎi) is a shallow lake covered in intricate vegetation patterns.
- Arrow Bamboo Lake (箭竹海, Jiànzhú Hǎi), covering an area of 170,000 m^{2}, is a shallow lake with a depth of 6 m. It lies at an elevation of 2,618 m, and was a main feature site for the 2002 Chinese film Hero.
- Panda Lake (熊猫海, Xióngmāo Hǎi) features curious color patterns of blue and green. Giant Pandas were said to have come to this lake to drink, though there have been no sightings for many years. The lake empties into the multi-stream, multi-level Panda Waterfalls, dropping 78 m in three steps.
- Five Flower Lake (五花海, Wǔhuā Hǎi) is a shallow multi-colored lake whose bottom is criss-crossed by ancient fallen tree trunks.
- Pearl Shoal (珍珠滩, Zhēnzhū Tān) is a wide, gently sloping area of active calcareous tufa deposition covered in a thin sheet of flowing water. It empties into the famous Pearl Waterfalls, where the shoal drops 28 m in a 310-metre-wide broad curtain of water. A scene of the television adaptation of Journey to the West was filmed there.
- Mirror Lake (镜海, Jìng Hǎi) is another quiet lake casting beautiful reflections of the surroundings when the water is calm.

=== Zechawa Valley ===
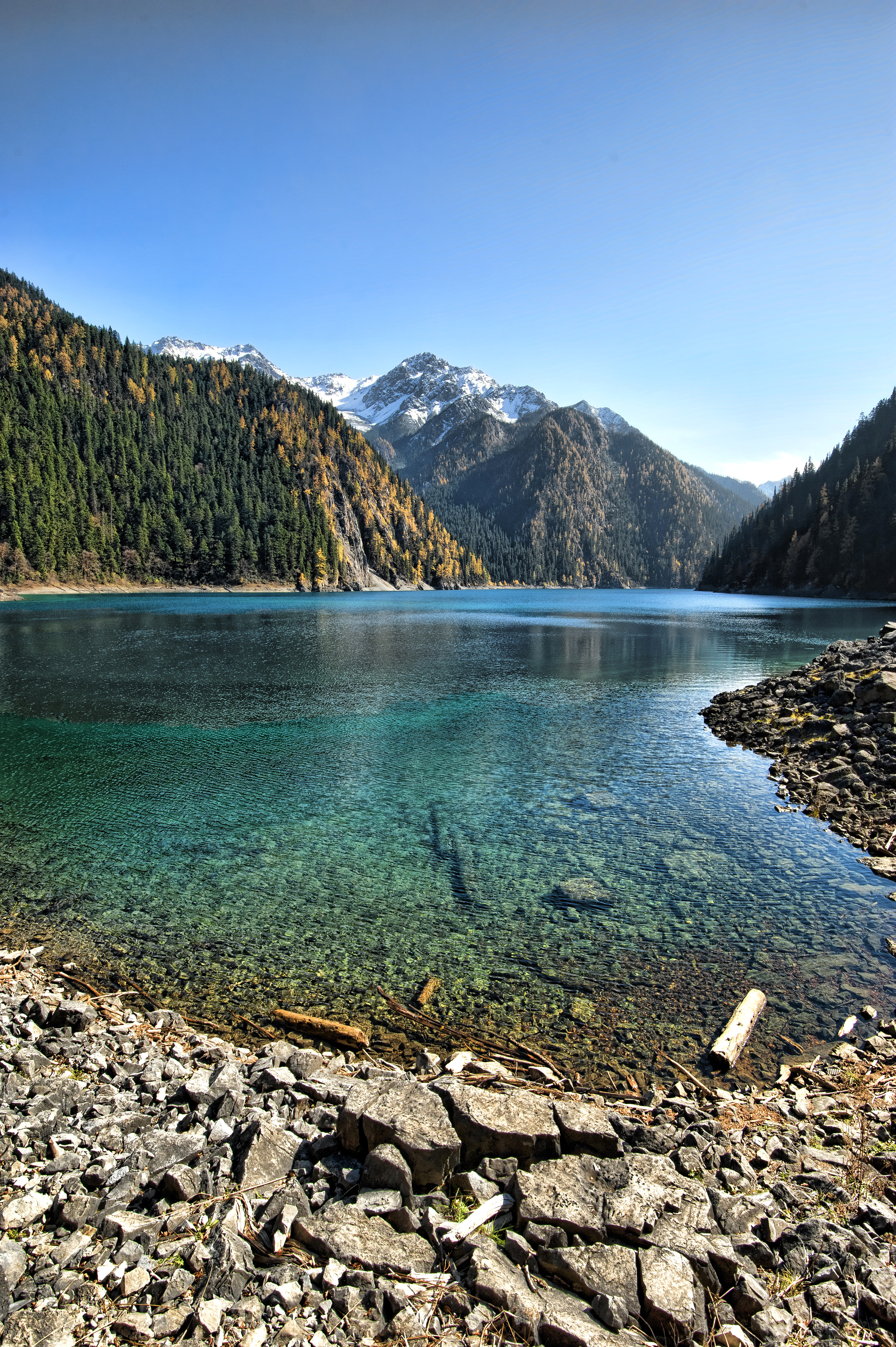
Long Lake is the highest, largest and deepest lake in Jiuzhaigou

The Zechawa Gully (则查洼沟, Zécháwā Gōu) is the south-eastern branch of Jiuzhaigou. It is approximately the same length as Rize gully (18 km) but climbs to a higher altitude (3150 m at the Long Lake). Going downhill from its highest point, it features the following sites:

- Long Lake (长海, Cháng Hǎi) is crescent-shaped and is the highest, largest and deepest lake in Jiuzhaigou, measuring 7.5 km (5 mi) in length and up to 103 m in depth. It reportedly has no outgoing waterways, getting its water from snowmelt and losing it from seepage. Local folklore features a monster in its depths.
- Five-Color Pond (五彩池, Wǔcǎi Chí) is one of the smallest bodies of water in Jiuzhaigou lakes. Despite its very modest dimensions and depth, it has a richly colored underwater landscape with some of the brightest and clearest waters in the area. According to legend, the pond was where Goddess Semo washed her hair and God Dage came daily to bring her water.
- The Seasonal Lakes (季节海, Jìjié Hǎi) are a series of 3 lakes (Lower, Middle and Upper) along the main road, that change from empty to full during each year.

=== Shuzheng Valley ===
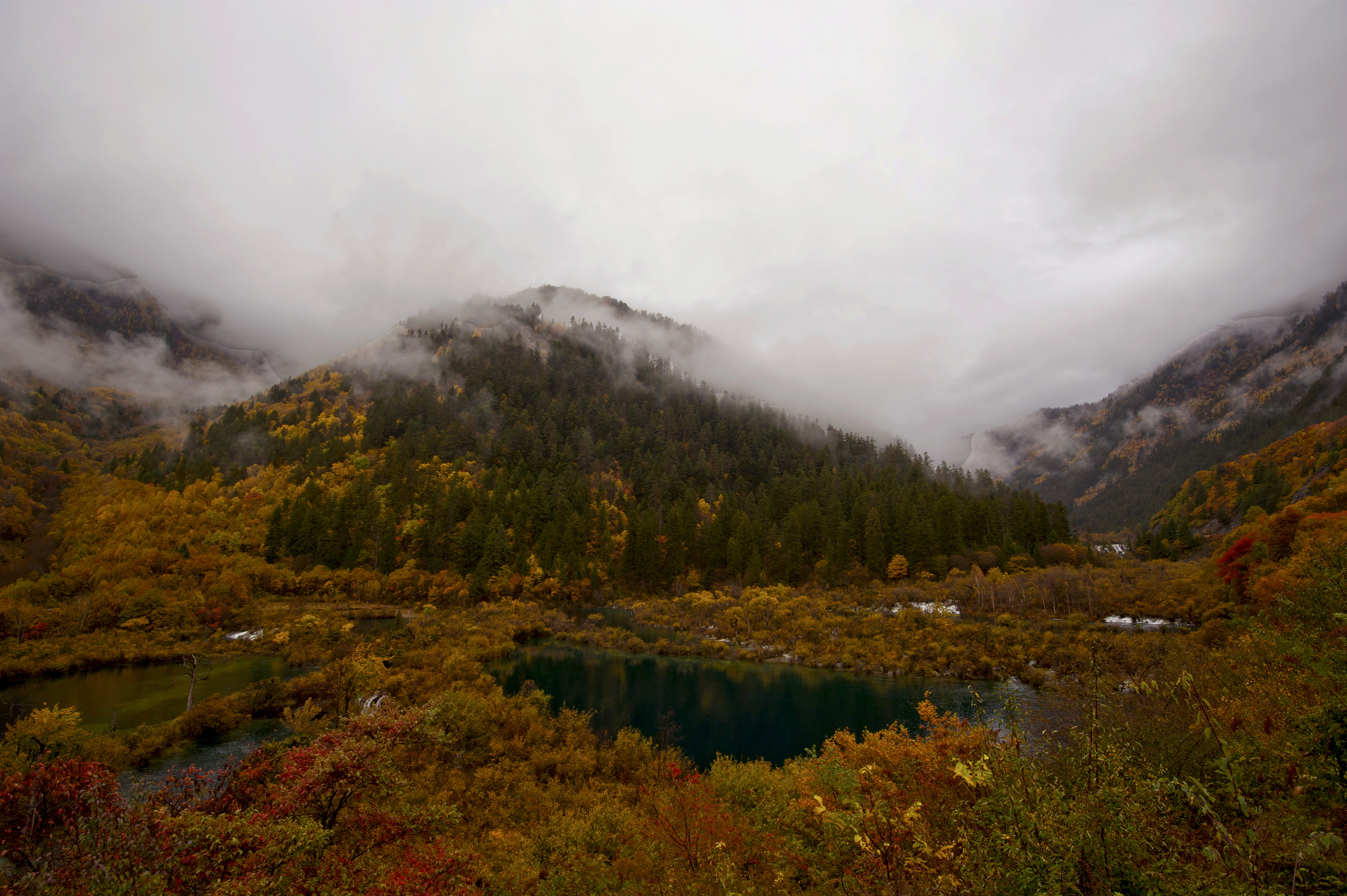
Sleeping Dragon Lake and Sparkling Lake amidst the morning mist during autumn

The Shuzheng Valley (树正沟, Shùzhèng Gōu) is the northern (main) branch of Jiuzhaigou. It ends after 14.5 km (9 mi) at the Y-shaped intersection of the three gullies. Going downhill from the intersection to the mouth of the valley, visitors encounter the following:

- Nuorilang Falls (诺日朗瀑布, Nuòrìlǎng Pùbù), near the junction of the valleys, are 20 m high and 320 m wide. They are reportedly the widest highland waterfall in China, the widest travertine-topped waterfall in the world, and one of the symbols of Jiuzhaigou.
- Nuorilang Lakes (诺日朗群海, Nuòrìlǎng Qúnhǎi) and Shuzheng Lakes (树正群海 Shùzhèng Qúnhǎi) are stepped series of respectively 18 and 19 ribbon lakes formed by the passage of glaciers, then naturally dammed. Some of them have their own folkloric names, such as the Rhinoceros, Unknown, and Tiger lakes.
- Sleeping Dragon Lake (卧龙海, Wòlóng Hǎi) is one of the lower lakes in the area. With a depth of 20 m, it is notable for the clearly visible calcareous dyke running through it, whose shape has been compared to a dragon lying on the bottom.
- Reed Lake (芦苇海, Lúwěi Hǎi) is a 1375-metre-long, reed-covered marsh with a clear turquoise brook (known as the "Jade Ribbon") zigzagging through it. The contrast is particularly striking in the autumn when the reeds turn golden yellow.

=== Others ===
- The Fairy Pool (神仙池, Shénxiān Chí) lies 42 km (26 mi) west of Jiuzhaigou and features travertine pools very similar to those of the nearby Huanglong Scenic and Historic Interest Area.

== Tourism ==
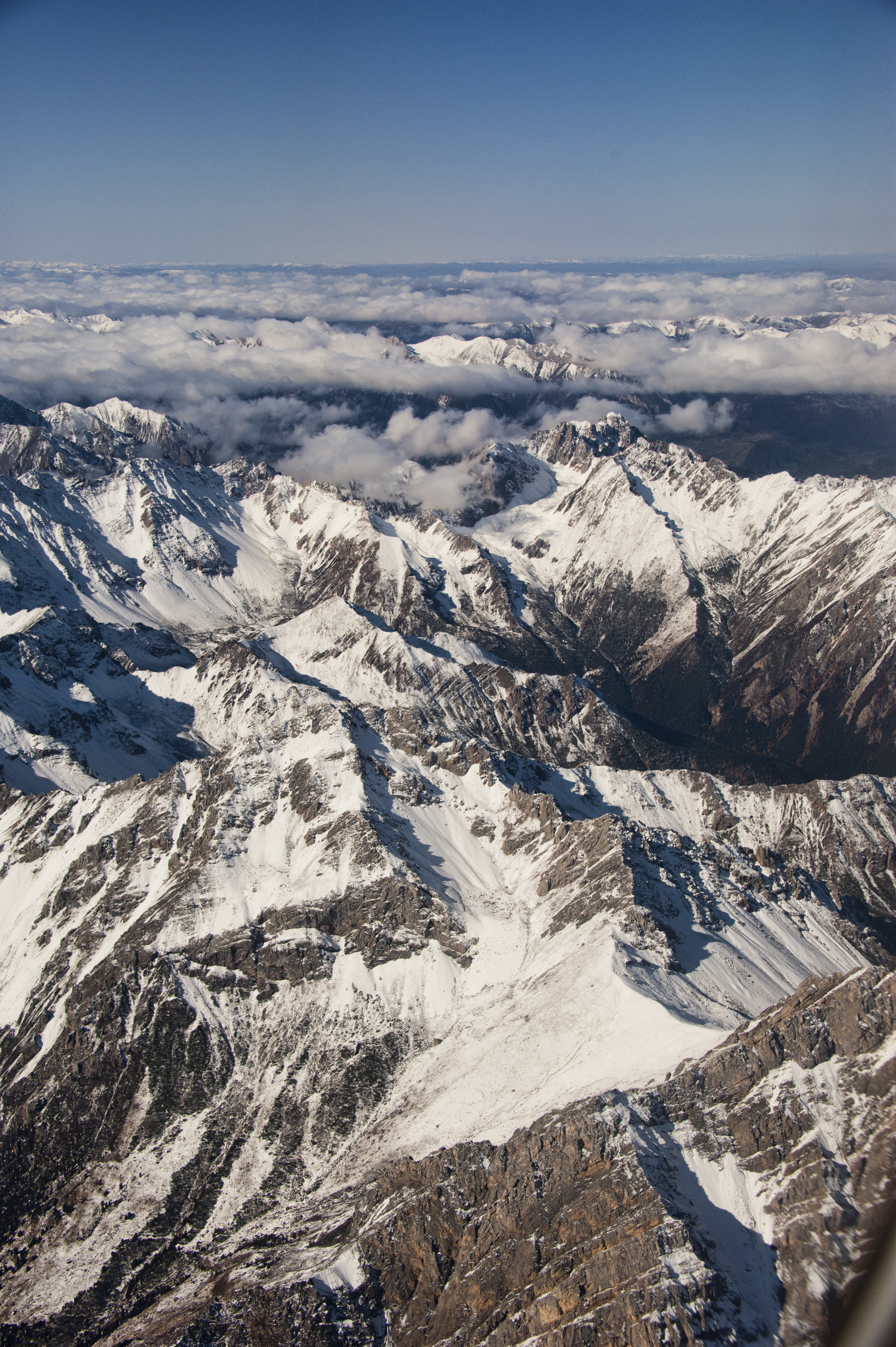
View of the Min Mountains as the plane approaches the Jiuzhai Huanglong Airport

The Zharu Valley (扎如沟, Zhārú Gōu) runs southeast from the main Shuzheng gully and is rarely visited by tourists. The valley begins at the Zharu Buddhist monastery and ends at the Red, Black, and Daling lakes.

Zharu Valley is the home of tourism in Jiuzhaigou. The valley has recently been opened to a small number of tourists wishing to go hiking and camping off the beaten track. Visitors can choose from day walks and multiple day hikes, depending on their time availability. Knowledgeable guides accompany tourists through the valley, sharing their knowledge about the unique biodiversity and local culture of the national park. The Zharu Valley has 40% of all the plant species that exist in China and it is the best place to spot wildlife inside the national park.

The main hike follows the pilgrimage of the local Benbo Buddhists circumnavigating the sacred 4,528 m Zha Yi Zha Ga Mountain.

== Access ==
Jiuzhaigou, compared with other high-traffic scenic spots in China, is still relatively difficult to reach. Until the opening of the Sichuan—Qinghai Railway in 2024, the majority of tourists reached the valley by a ten-hour bus ride from Chengdu along the Min River canyon. The new highway constructed along this route was badly damaged during the 2008 Sichuan Earthquake, but has since been repaired and the road is open to public buses and private vehicles.

Since 2003, it has been possible to fly from Chengdu or Chongqing to Jiuzhai Huanglong Airport on a 3,448-metre-high (11,311 ft) mountain side in Songpan County, and then take an hour-long bus ride to Huanglong, or a 90-minute bus ride to Jiuzhaigou. Since 2006, a daily flight to Xi'an opens in the peak season. In October 2009, new direct flights were added from Beijing, Shanghai, and Hangzhou.

Huanglongjiuzhai railway station, opened on 30 August 2024, is the closest station to Jiuzhaigou, some 90 minutes away by car. The station forms part of the Sichuan—Qinghai Railway.

== Protection ==
As a national park and national nature reserve, Jiuzhaigou Valley Scenic and Historic Interest Area is protected by national and provincial laws and regulations, ensuring the long-term management and protection of the heritage. In 2004, the Sichuan Provincial Regulations on the Protection of World Heritage and the Implementation of the Sichuan Provincial Regulations on the Protection of World Heritage in Aba Autonomous Prefecture became laws, providing a stricter basis for the protection of heritage.

The Sichuan Provincial Construction Commission is fully responsible for the protection and management of the site. The Jiuzhaigou Valley Scenic and Historic Interest Area Administrative Bureau (ABJ) consists of several departments, including the Protection Section, the Construction Section, the police station and so on, which are responsible for the field administration. In addition to national legislation, there are many relevant local government laws and regulations. The revised management plan in 2001 is based on these laws and contains specific regulations and recommendations: prohibiting the logging of trees and forests, as well as activities that cause pollution, and fully considering the needs of local Tibetan residents.

== Image gallery ==
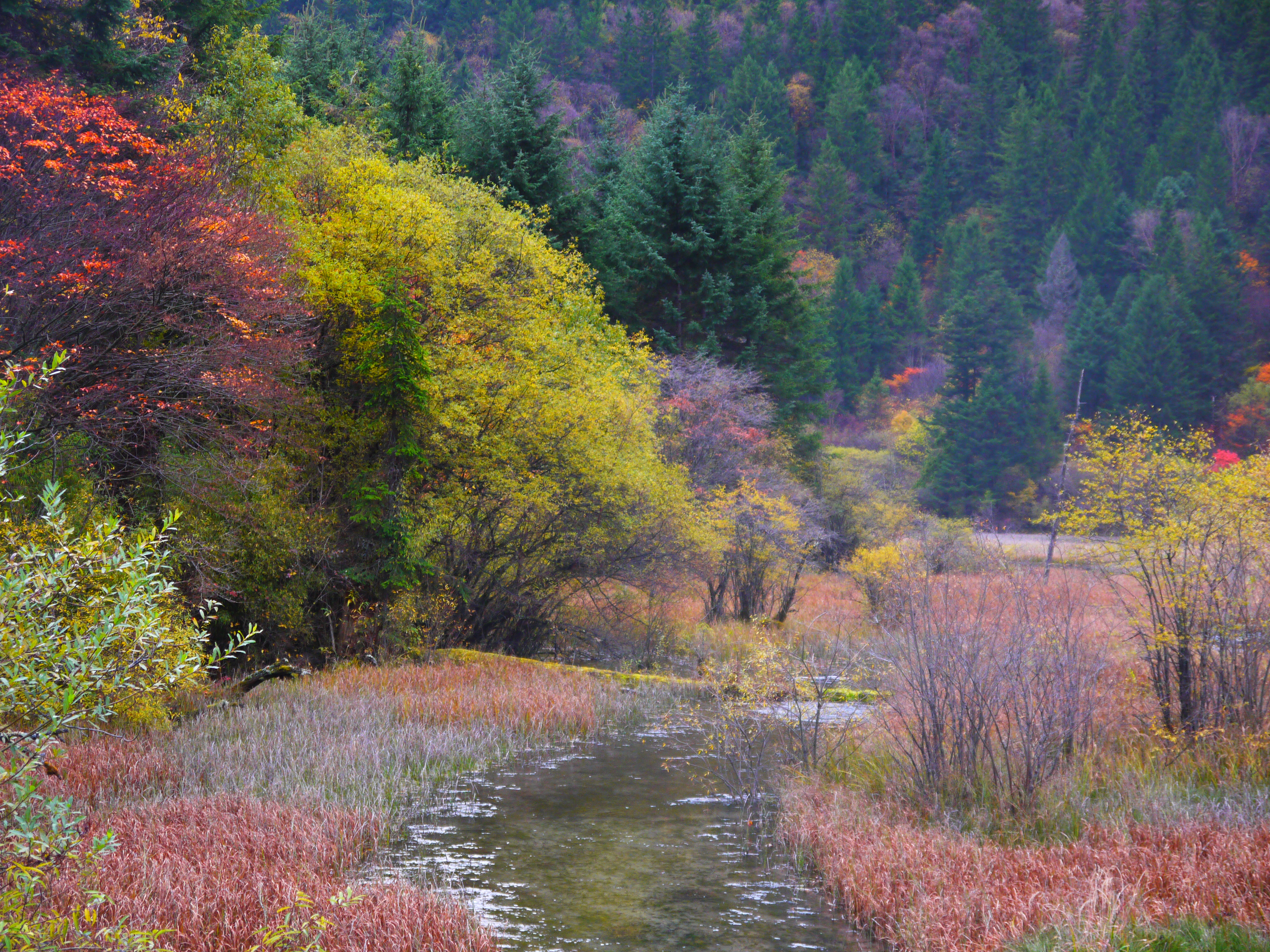
Arrow Bamboo Lake

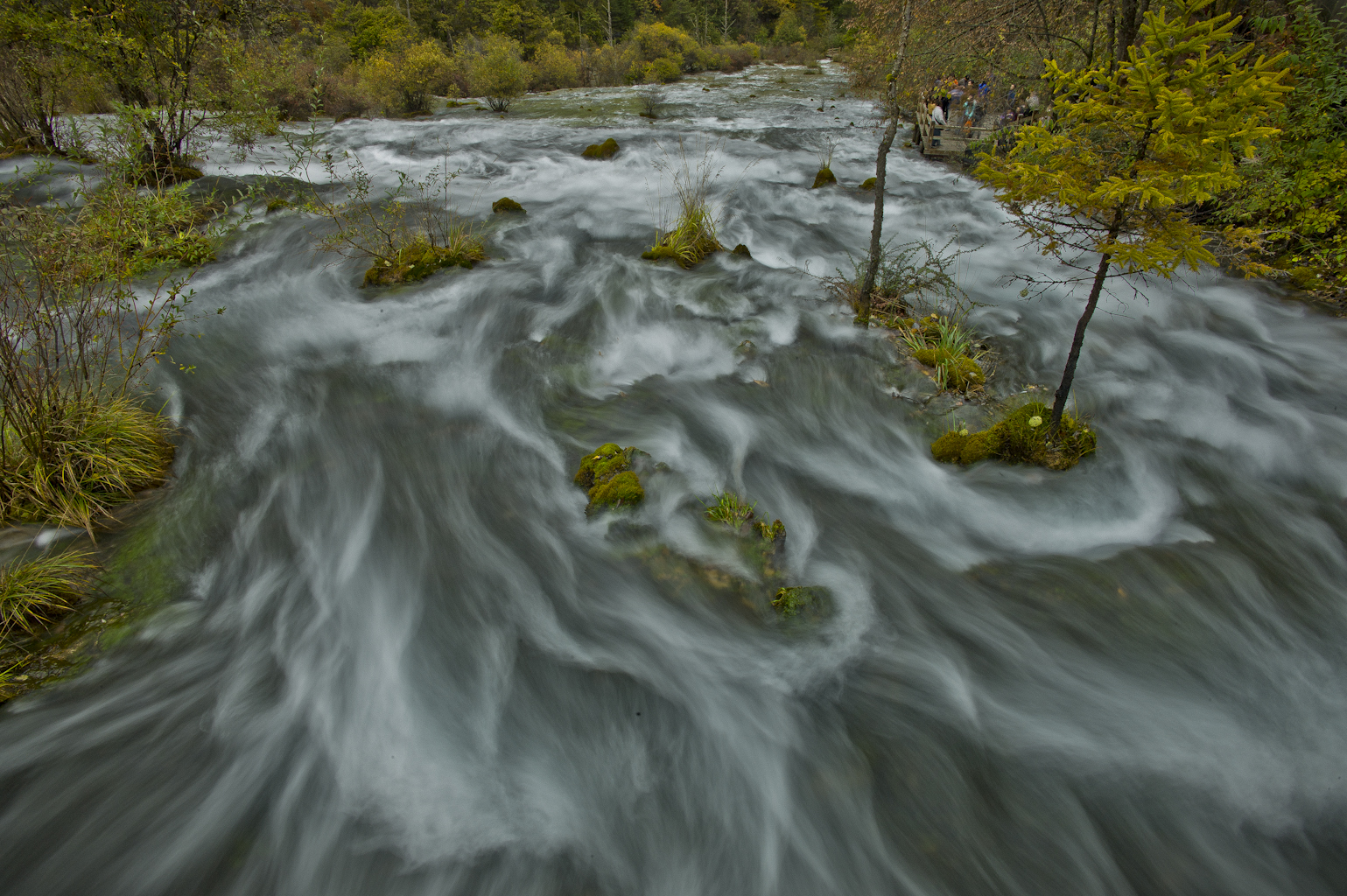
Pearl Shoal rapids

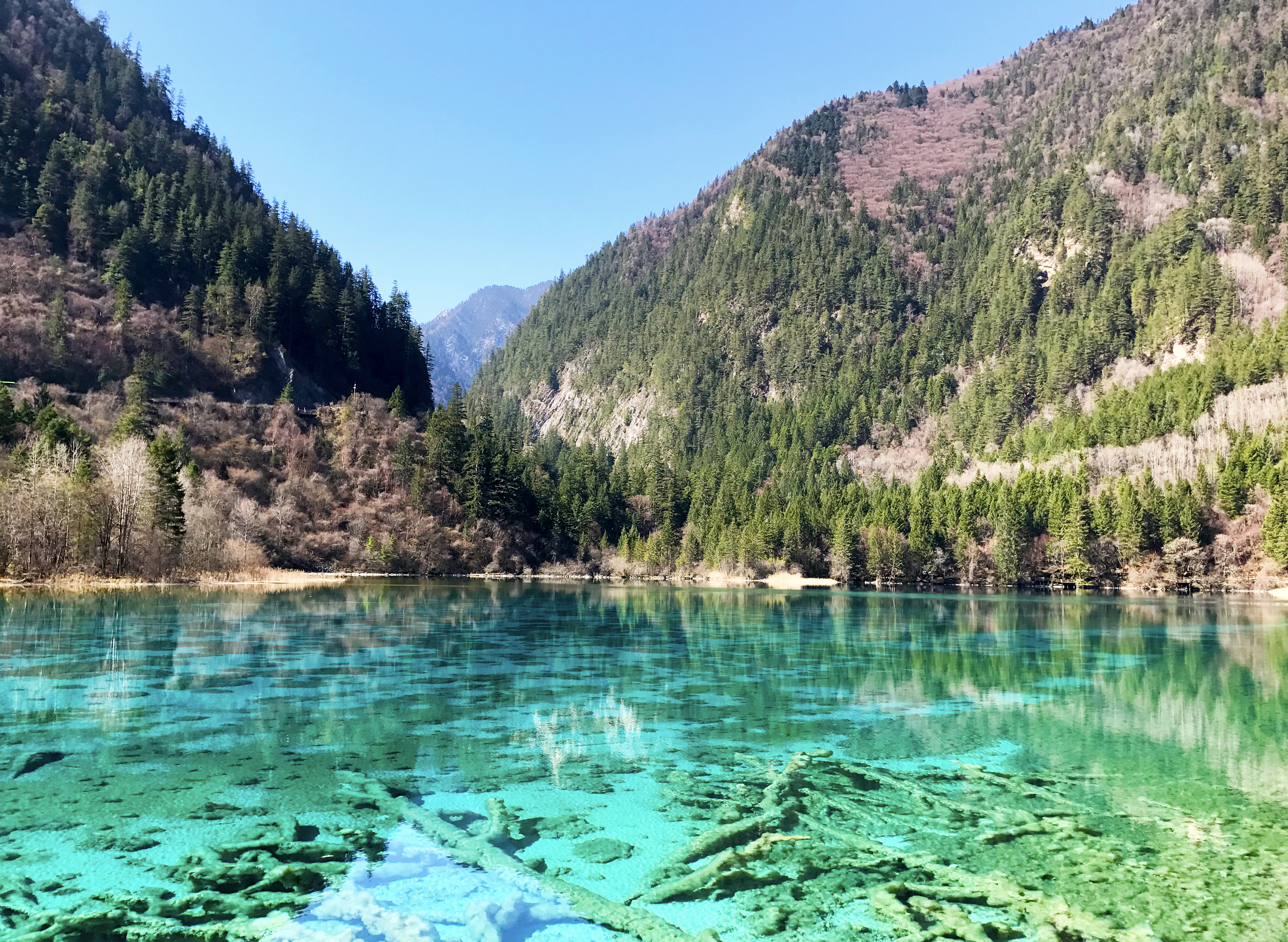
Stunning emerald green lake water in the park

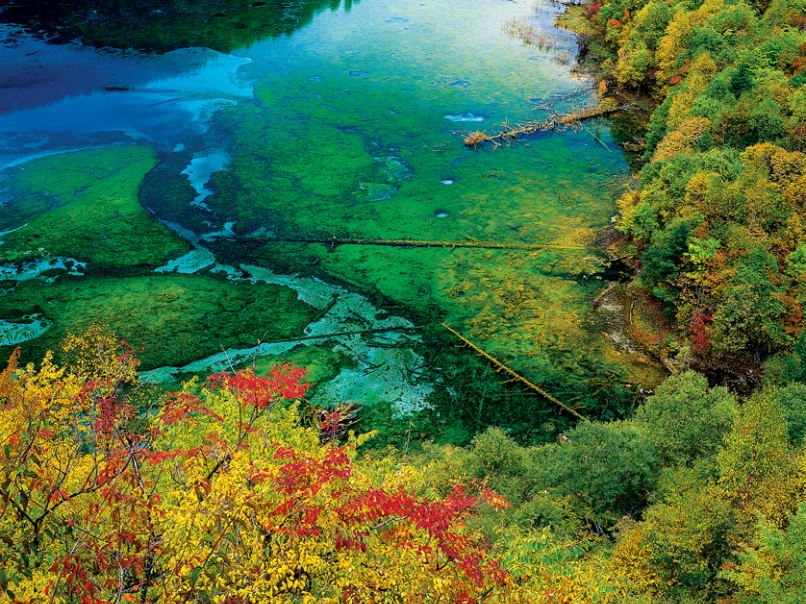
Five Flower Lake

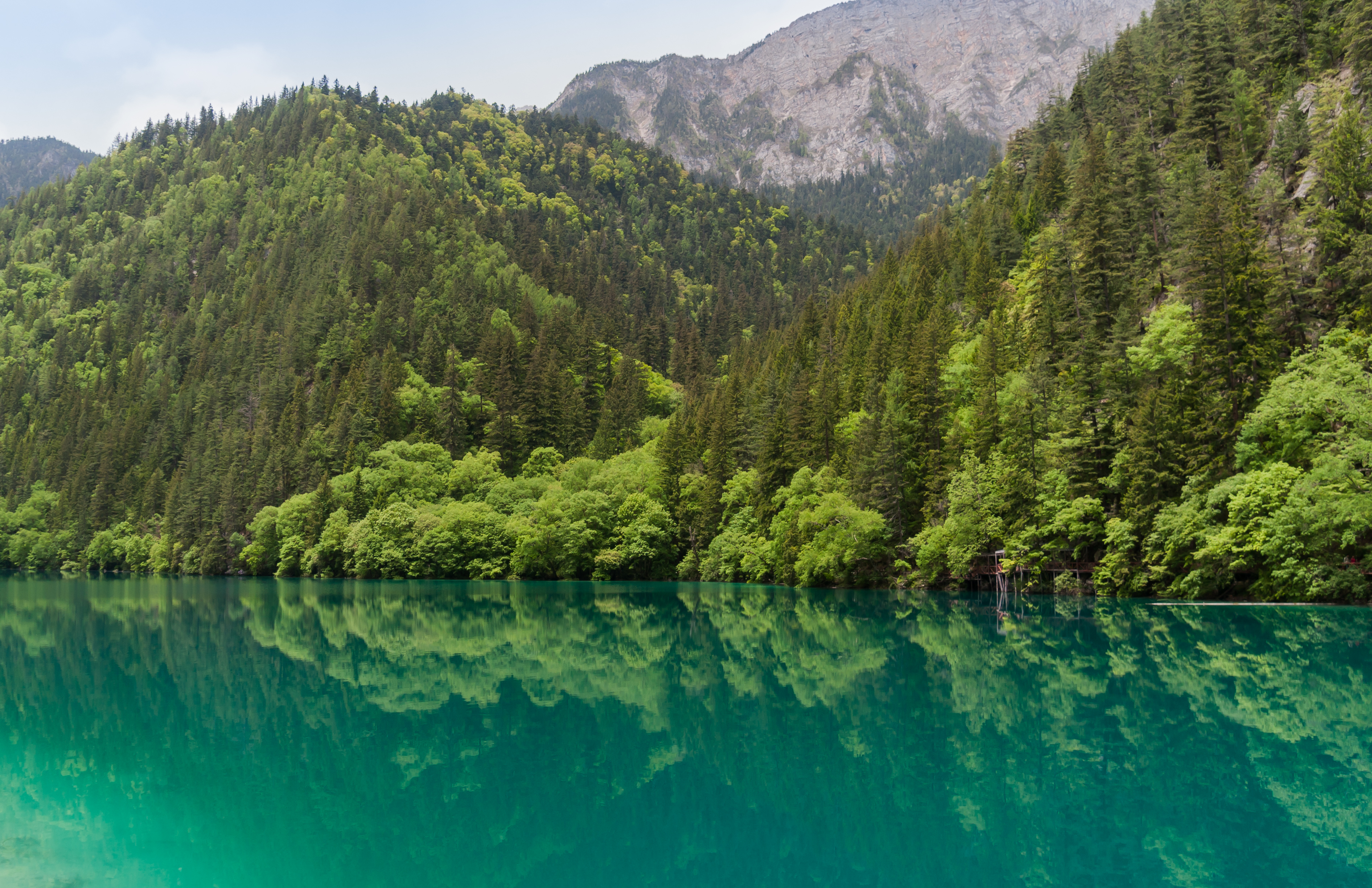
Panda Lake

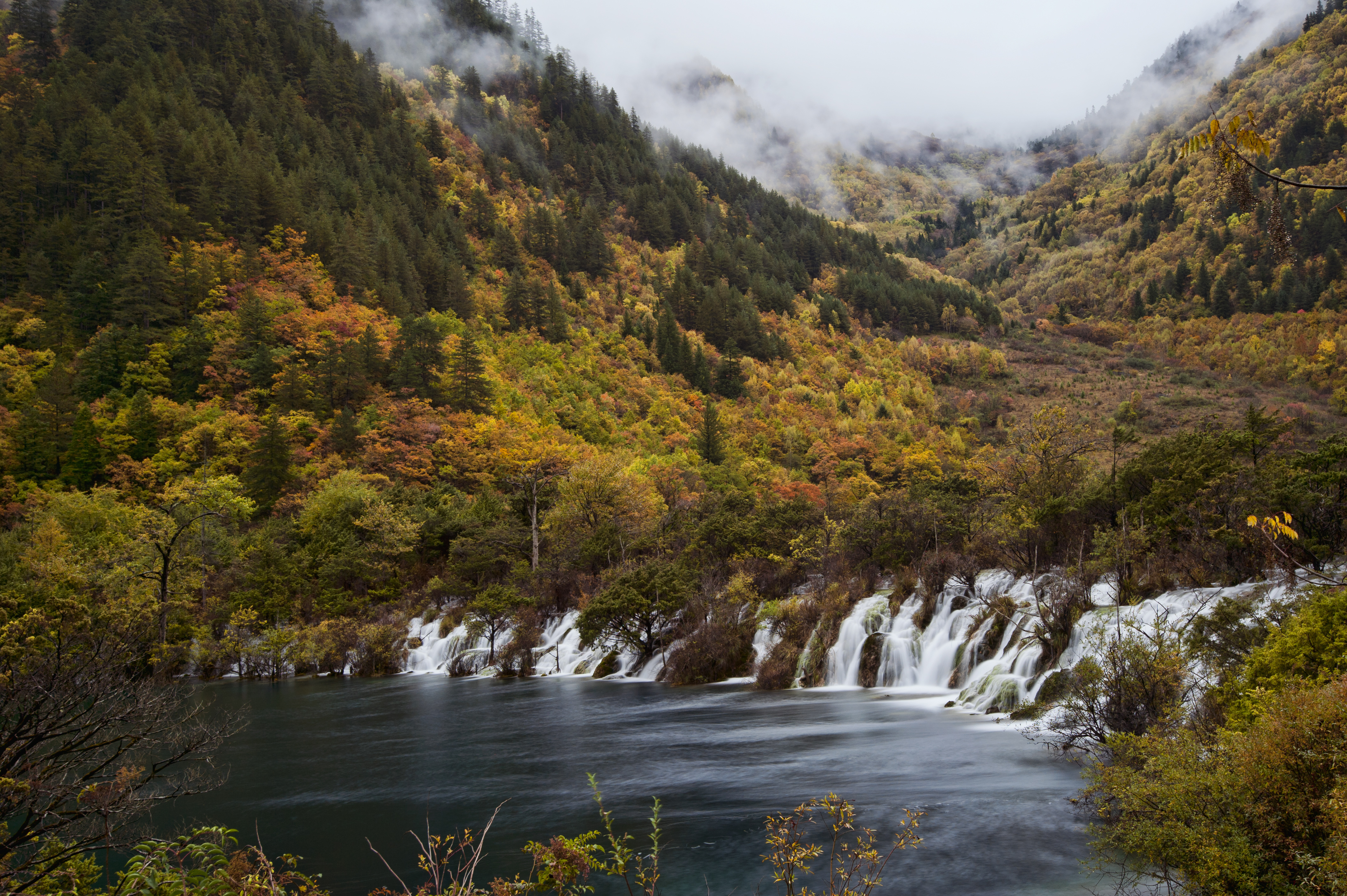
Sleeping Dragon Lake

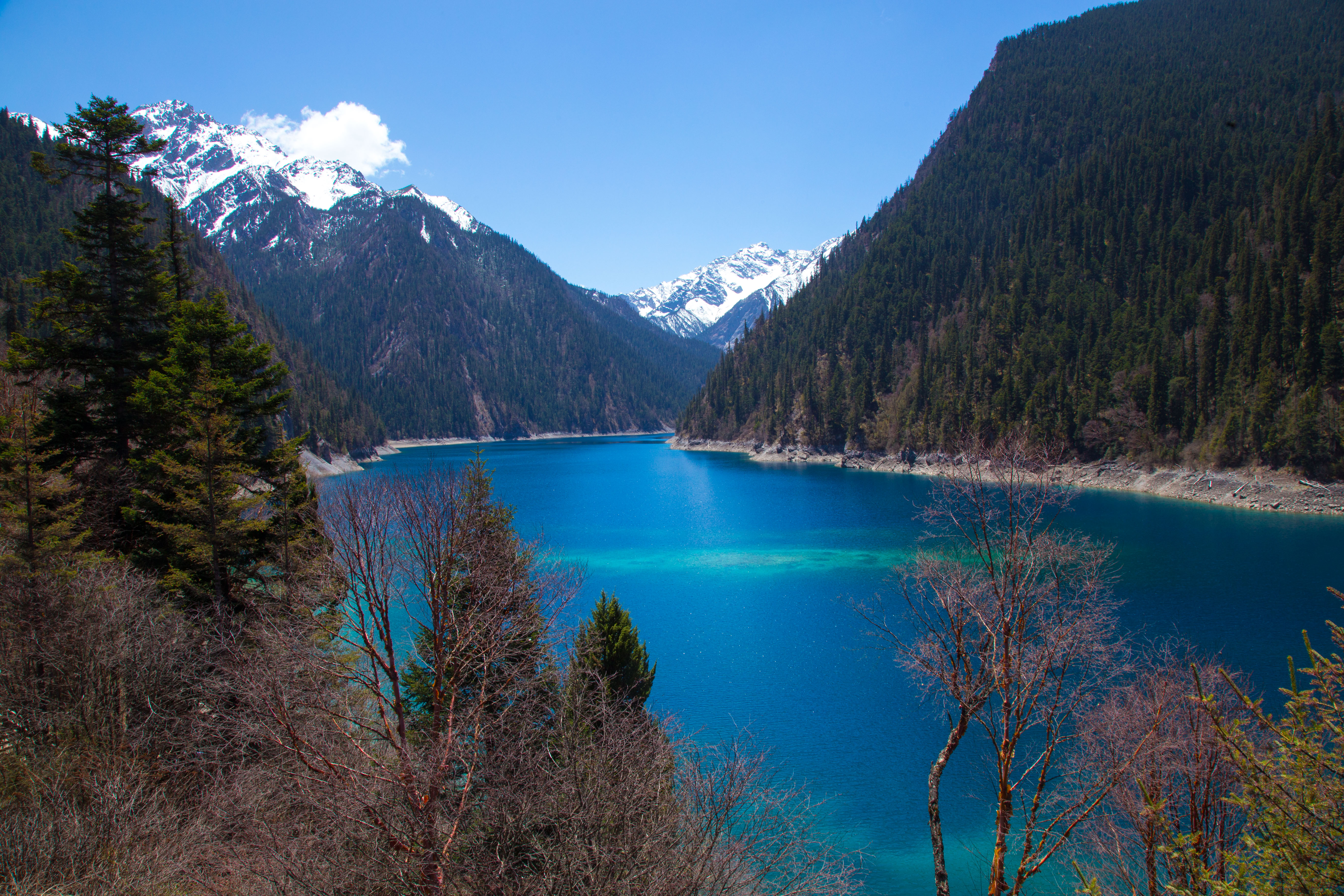
Long Lake

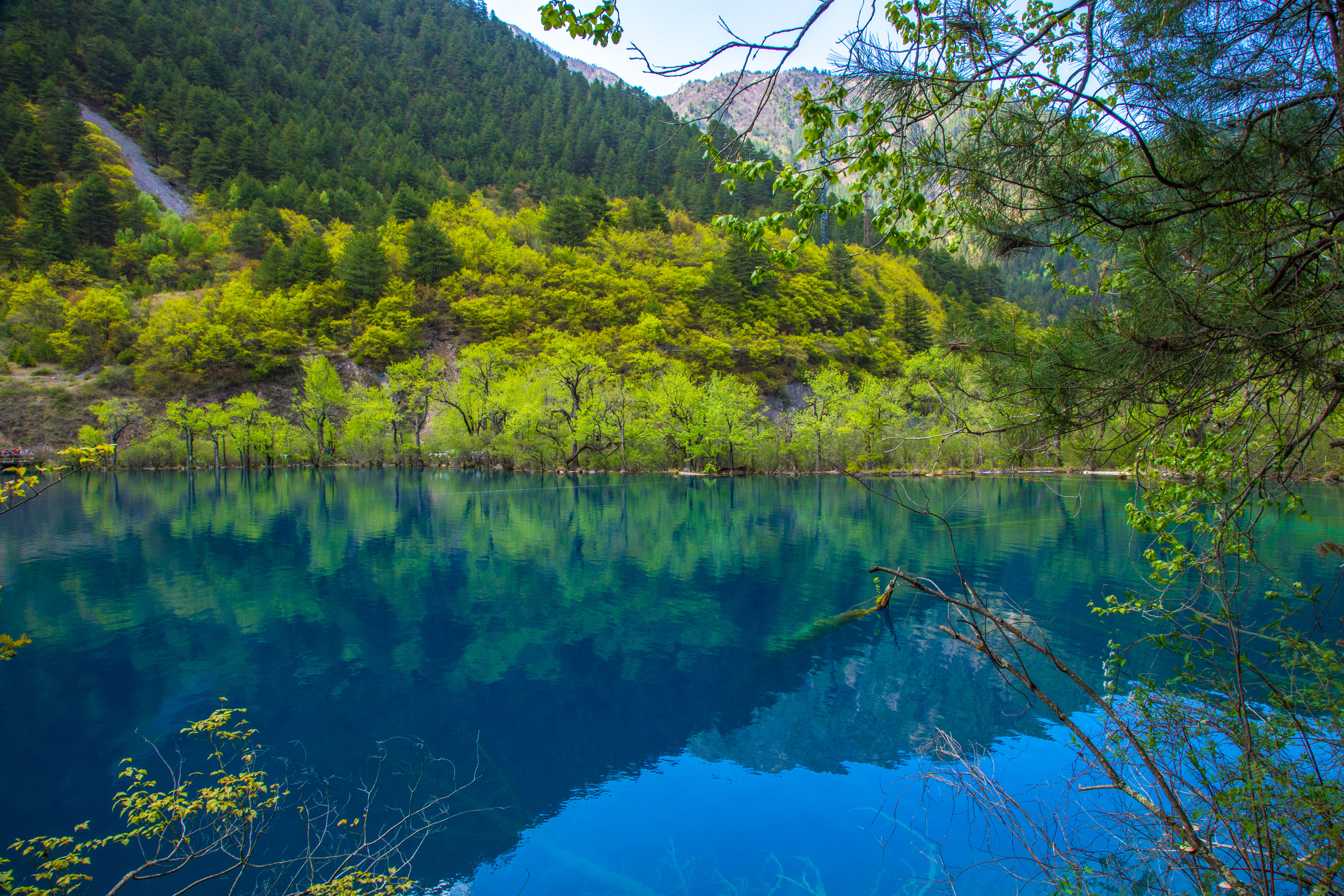
Tiger Lake

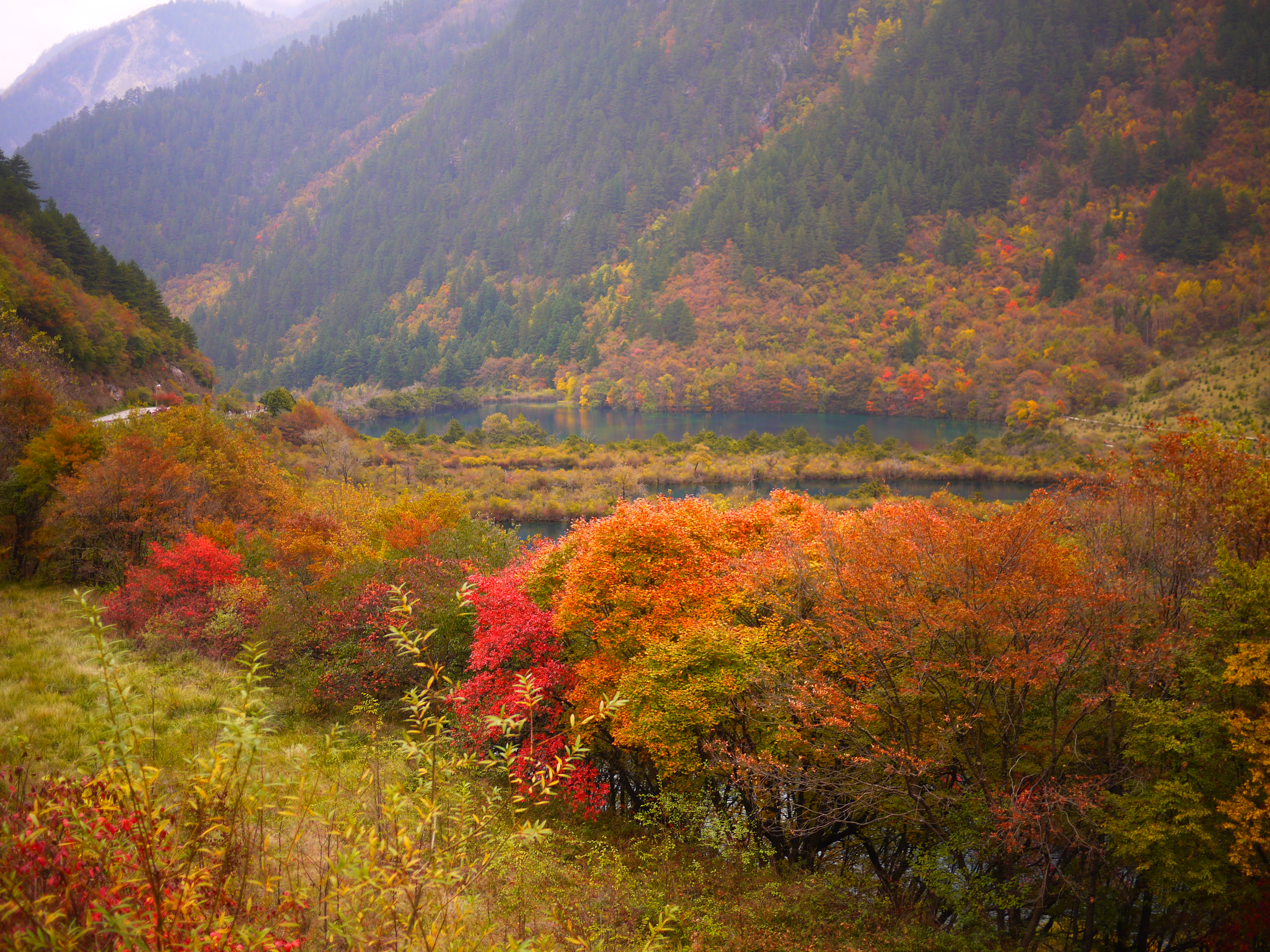
Shuzheng Lakes

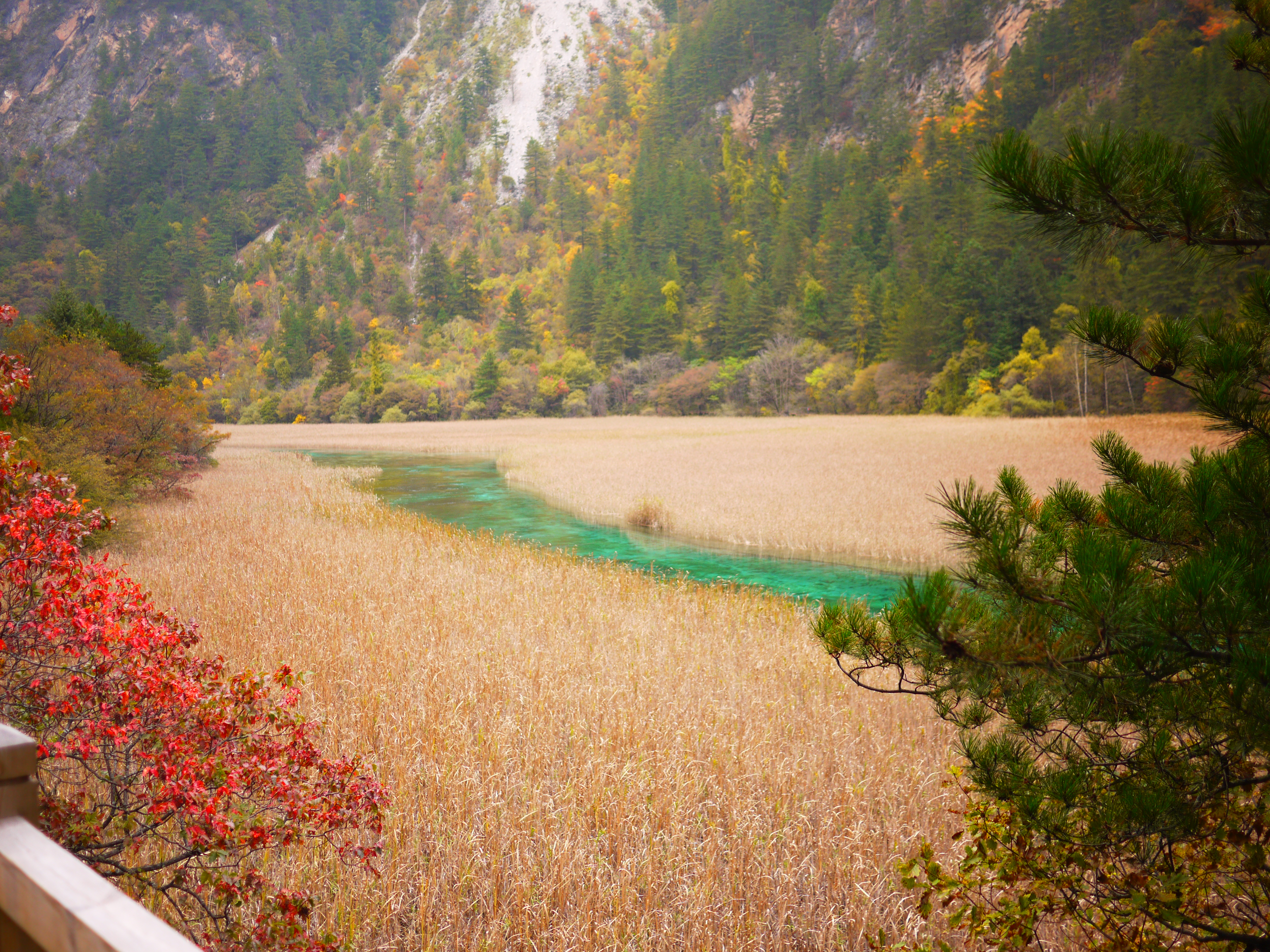
"Jade Ribbon" in Reed Lake

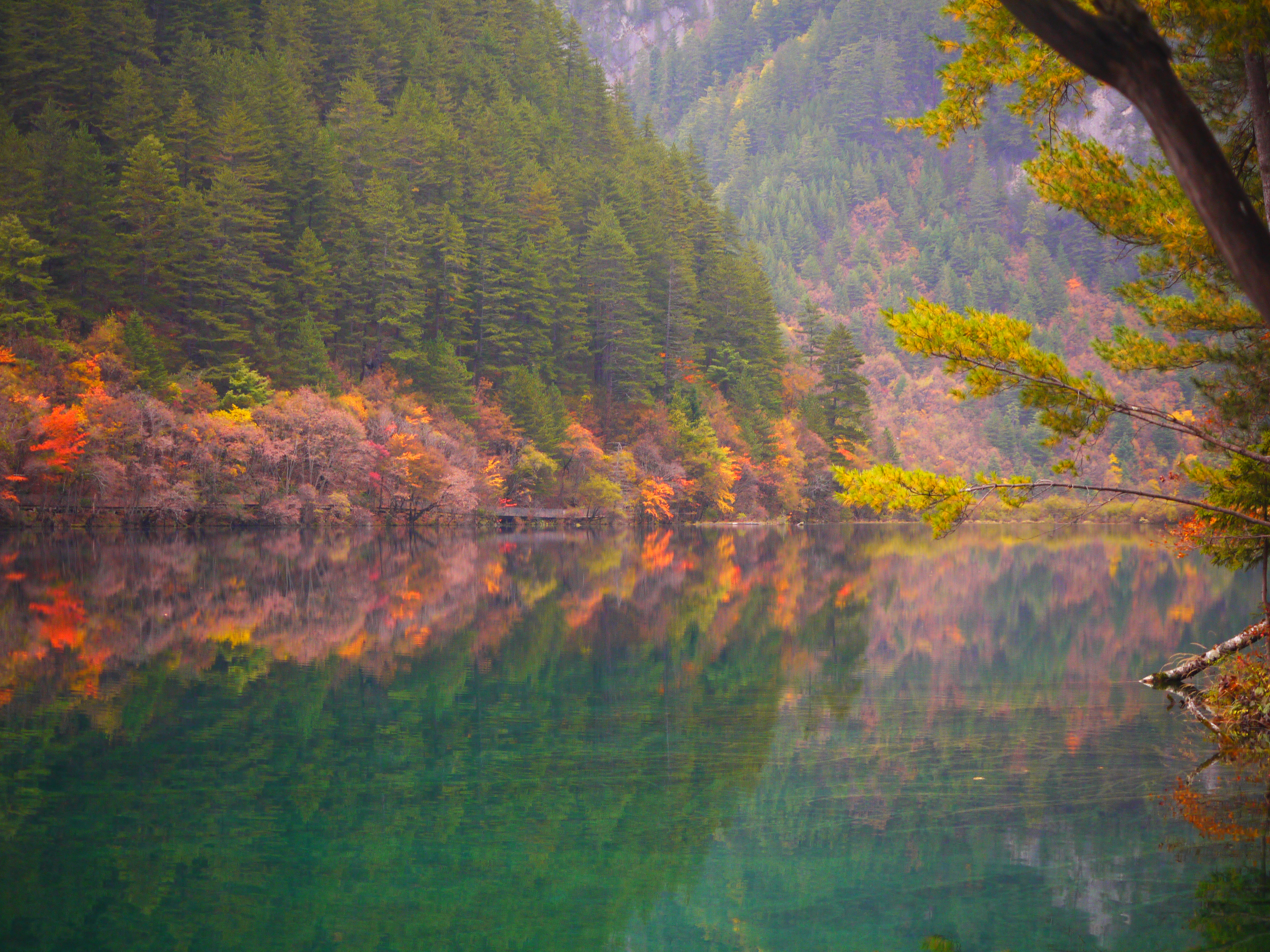
Mirror Lake

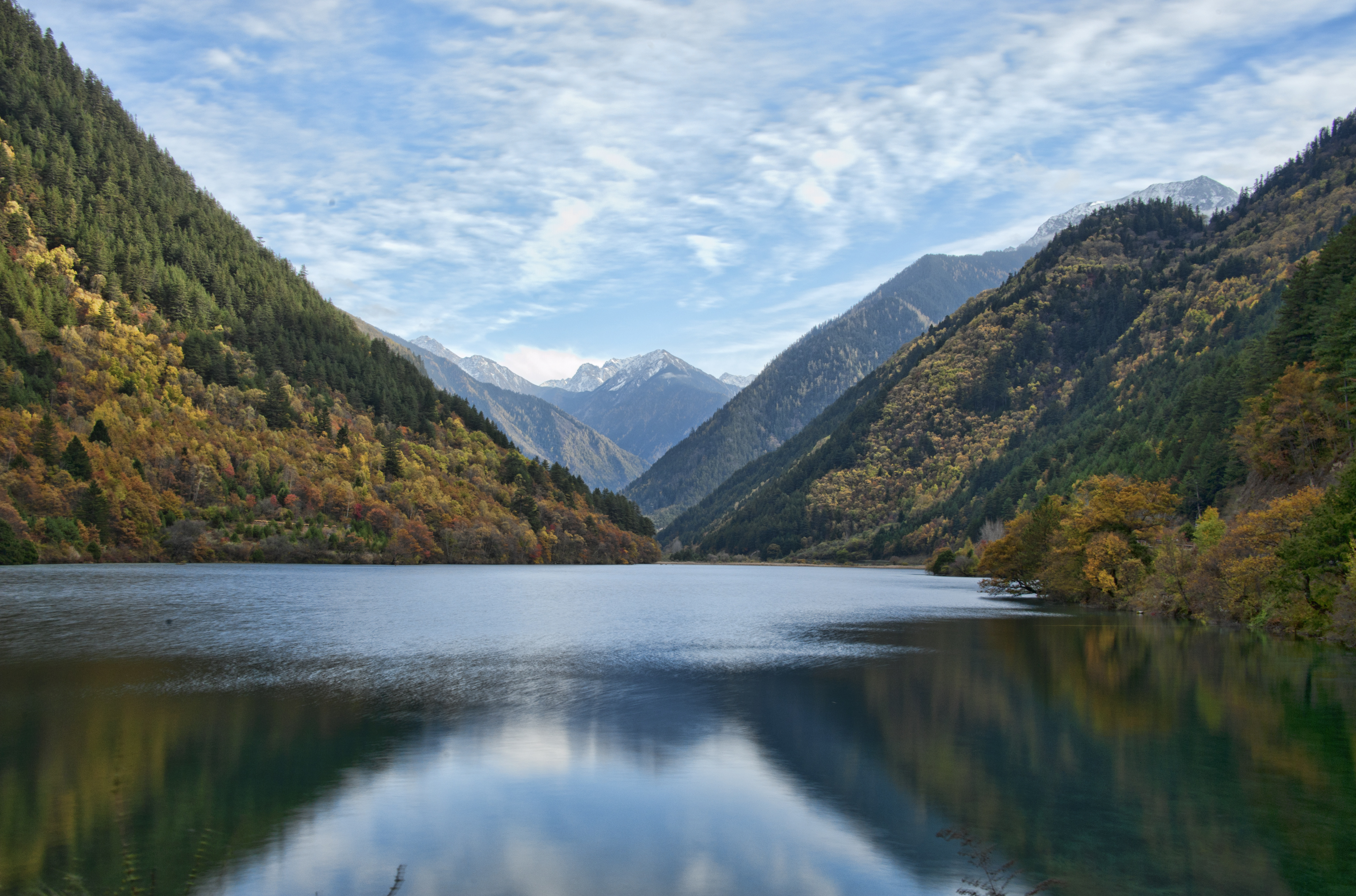
Rhinoceros Lake

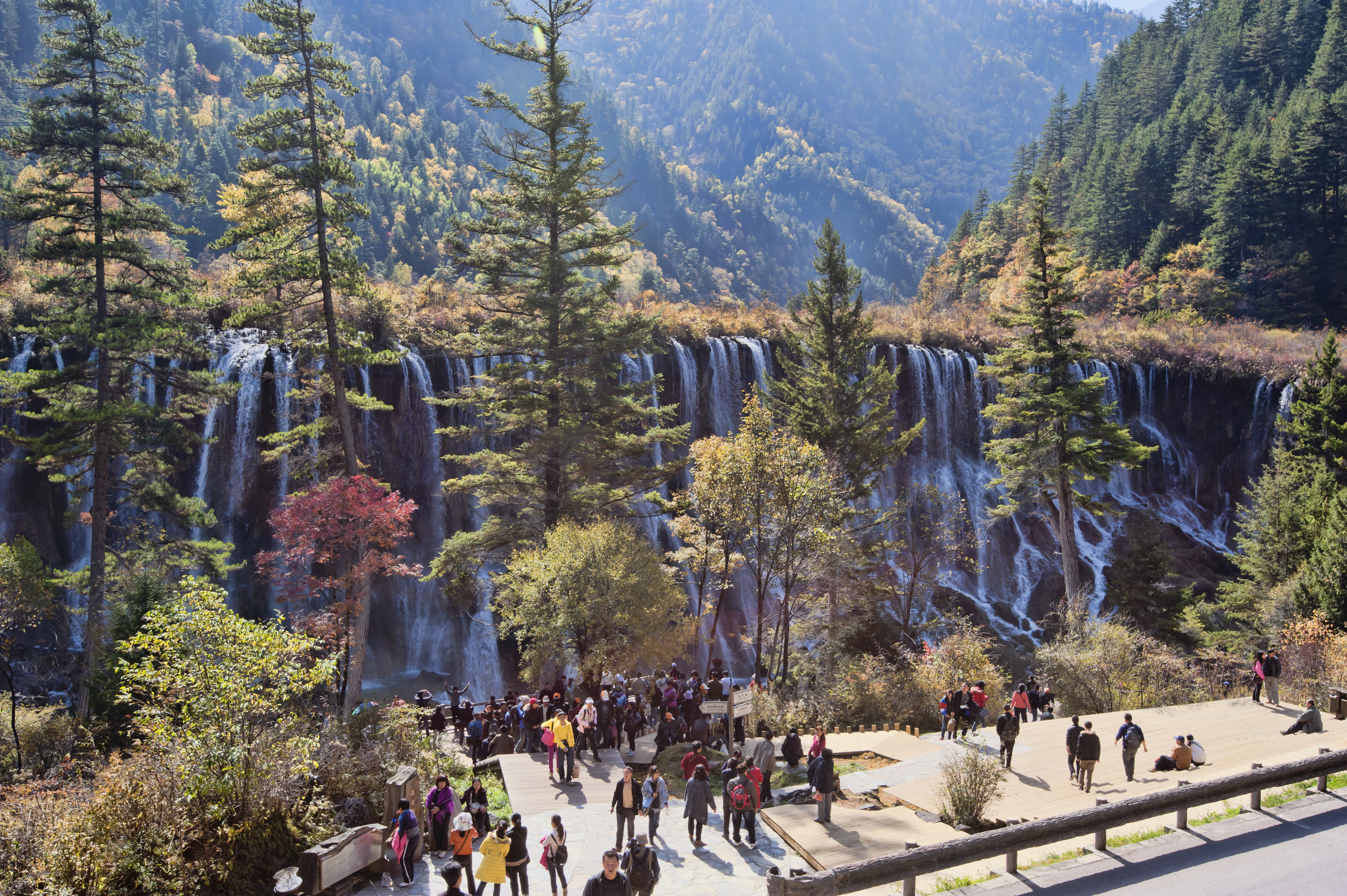

== See also ==
Related places

- Pearl Waterfall
- Huanglong Scenic and Historic Interest Area, south of Jiuzhaigou

Related lists

- List of World Heritage Sites in China
- List of Biosphere Reserves in China
