= Jiuzhai Huanglong Airport =

Jiuzhai Huanglong Airport 九寨黄龙机场
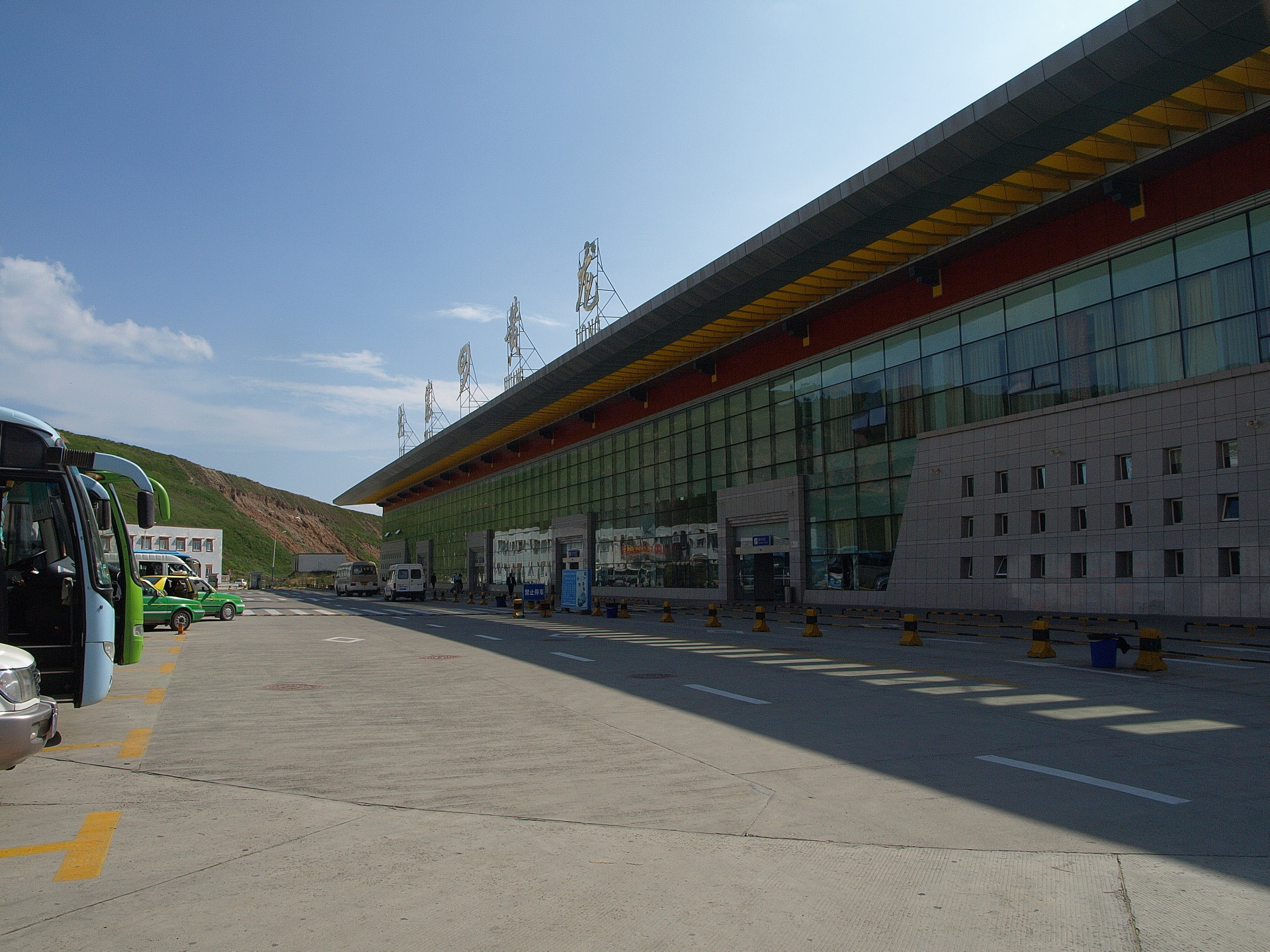
- IATA: JZH; ICAO: ZUJZ

Summary
- Airport type: Public
- Operator: Sichuan Jiuzhaihuanglong Airport Co. Ltd.
- Location: Songpan, Sichuan
- Elevation AMSL: 3,448 m (11,312 ft)
- Coordinates: 32°51′15″N 103°41′07″E
- Website: www.jzairport.com

Map
- Location of airport in Sichuan

Runways
Direction	Length		Surface
Direction	m	ft	Surface
02/20	3,200	10,499	Concrete

Statistics (2021)
- Passengers: 150,029
- Aircraft movements: 2,222
- Cargo (metric tons): 16.9
- Source: CAAC

Jiuzhai Huanglong Airport
- Simplified Chinese: 九寨黄龙机场
- Traditional Chinese: 九寨黃龍機場
Transcriptions
Standard Mandarin
- Hanyu Pinyin: Jiǔzhài Huánglóng Jīchǎng

Jiuzhai Huanglong Airport (IATA: JZH, ICAO: ZUJZ) is an airport in Songpan County, Sichuan province, China. This airport serves two major scenic places of interest in this area, namely Huanglong Scenic and Historic Interest Area, 53 kilometres (33 mi) away, and Jiuzhaigou, 88 km (55 mi) away. It is 3,448 metres (11,312 ft) above sea level.

Jiuzhai Huanglong Airport is about 240 km (150 mi) (40 minutes' flight) from Chengdu Shuangliu International Airport, an aviation hub of Southwest China. It started flights on September 28, 2003, and has one runway of length 3,200 m (10,500 ft) and width 60 m (200 ft).

Due to the elevation of 3,448 m (11,312 ft), some passengers may experience symptoms of altitude sickness. This should be taken into consideration when planning to fly into or out of Jiuzhai Huanglong airport. The first aid center at the airport has small canisters of oxygen and Tibetan herbal medicine for sale.

During off-season peak in 2026, this airport is handled only 1,069 passengers inbound and outbound. On 1 February 2026, only 1 passenger on this flight from this airport to Tianfu Airport. Due to the extremely low passengers, Jiuzhai Huanglong Airport may have to suspended operations in the near future.

== Airlines and destinations ==
As of October 2023, the airport is served by the following airlines.

Airlines	Destinations
Air China	Beijing–Capital, Chengdu–Tianfu
Sichuan Airlines	Chengdu–Tianfu

== See also ==
- List of airports in China
- List of highest airports
