= Southwest China administration division codes of the PRC (Division 5) =

List of administrative division codes of the PRC in Division 5 or Southwest China .

== Chongqing (50) ==
500000	Chongqing municipality 重庆市								
500100	District 市辖区	500101	Wanzhou 万州区	500102	Fuling 涪陵区	500103	Yuzhong 渝中区	500104	Dadukou 大渡口区
500100	District 市辖区	500105	Jiangbei 江北区	500106	Shapingba 沙坪坝区	500107	Jiulongpo 九龙坡区	500108	Nan'an 南岸区
500100	District 市辖区	500109	Beibei 北碚区	500110	Qijiang 綦江区	500111	Dazu 大足区	500112	Yubei 渝北区
500100	District 市辖区			500110 (Deleted)	~~Wansheng~~ 万盛区	500111 (Deleted)	~~Shuangqiao~~ 双桥区		
500100	District 市辖区	500113	Banan 巴南区	500114	Qianjiang 黔江区	500115	Changshou 长寿区	500116	Jiangjin 江津区
500100	District 市辖区	500117	Hechuan 合川区	500118	Yongchuan 永川区	500119	Nanchuan 南川区	500120	Bishan 璧山区
500100	District 市辖区	500151	Tongliang 铜梁区	500152	Tongnan 潼南区	500153	Rongchang 荣昌区	500154	Kaizhou 开州区
500100	District 市辖区	500155	Liangping 梁平区	500156	Wulong 武隆区				
500220	County 县	500221	~~Changshou Co.~~ 长寿县	500222	~~Qijiang Co.~~ 綦江县	500223	~~Tongnan Co.~~ 潼南县	500224	~~Tongliang Co.~~ 铜梁县
500220	County 县	500225	~~Dazu Co.~~ 大足县	500226	~~Rongchang Co.~~ 荣昌县	500227	~~Bishan Co.~~ 璧山县	500228	~~Liangping Co.~~ 梁平县
500220	County 县	500229	Chengkou Co. 城口县	500230	Fengdu Co. 丰都县	500231	Dianjiang Co. 垫江县	500232	~~Wulong Co.~~ 武隆县
500220	County 县	500233	Zhong Co. 忠县	500234	~~Kai Co.~~ 开县	500235	Yunyang Co. 云阳县	500236	Fengjie Co. 奉节县
500220	County 县	500237	Wushan Co. 巫山县	500238	Wuxi Co. 巫溪县	500239	~~Qianjiang Co.~~ 黔江县	500240	Shizhu Co. 石柱县
500220	County 县	500241	Xiushan Co. 秀山县	500242	Youyang Co. 酉阳县	500243	Pengshui Co. 彭水县		
500300	~~County-level city~~ 县级市								
500300	~~County-level city~~ 县级市	500381	~~Jiangjin city~~ 江津市	500382	~~Hechuan city~~ 合川市	500383	~~Yongchuan city~~ 永川市	500384	~~Nanchuan city~~ 南川市

== Sichuan (51) ==
510000	Sichuan Province 四川省								
510100	Chengdu city 成都市								
510101	District 市辖区	510102	~~Dongcheng~~ 东城区	510103	~~Xicheng~~ 西城区	510104	Jinjiang 锦江区	510105	Qingyang 青羊区
510101	District 市辖区	510106	Jinniu 金牛区	510107	Wuhou 武侯区	510108	Chenghua 成华区		
510101	District 市辖区			510111	~~Jinniu~~ 金牛区	510112	Longquanyi 龙泉驿区	510113	Qingbaijiang 青白江区
510101	District 市辖区	510114	Xindu 新都区	510115	Wenjiang 温江区	510116	Shuangliu 双流区	510117	Pidu 郫都区
510101	District 市辖区					510120	~~Shi~~ 市区		
510121	Jintang Co. 金堂县	510122	~~Shuangliu Co.~~ 双流县	510123	~~Wenjiang Co.~~ 温江县	510124	~~Pi Co.~~ 郫县	510125	~~Xindu Co.~~ 新都县
510126	~~Peng Co.~~ 彭县	510127	~~Guan Co.~~ 灌县	510128	~~Chongqing Co.~~ 崇庆县	510129	Dayi Co. 大邑县	510130	~~Qionglai Co.~~ 邛崃县
510131	Pujiang Co. 蒲江县	510132	Xinjin Co. 新津县						
510181	Dujiangyan city 都江堰市	510182	Pengzhou city 彭州市	510183	Qionglai city 邛崃市	510184	Chongzhou city 崇州市	510185	Jianyang city 简阳市
510200	~~Chongqing city~~ 重庆市								
510300	Zigong city 自贡市								
510301	District 市辖区	510302	Ziliujing 自流井区	510303	Gongjing 贡井区	510304	Da'an 大安区		
510301	District 市辖区			510311	Yantan 沿滩区				
510301	District 市辖区					510320	~~Shi~~ 市区		
510321	Rong Co. 荣县	510322	Fushun Co. 富顺县						
510400	Panzhihua city 攀枝花市								
510401	District 市辖区	510402	Dong 东区	510403	Xi 西区				
510401	District 市辖区			510411	Renhe 仁和区				
510401	District 市辖区					510420	~~Shi~~ 市区		
510421	Miyi Co. 米易县	510422	Yanbian Co. 盐边县						
510500	Luzhou city 泸州市								
510501	District 市辖区	510502	Jiangyang 江阳区	510503	Naxi 纳溪区	510504	Longmatan 龙马潭区		
510521	Lu Co. 泸县	510522	Hejiang Co. 合江县	510523	~~Naxi Co.~~ 纳溪县	510524	Xuyong Co. 叙永县	510525	Gulin Co. 古蔺县
510600	Deyang city 德阳市								
510601	District 市辖区	510602	~~Shizhong~~ 市中区	510603	Jingyang 旌阳区	510604	Luojiang 罗江区		
510621	~~Deyang Co.~~ 德阳县	510622	~~Mianzhu Co.~~ 绵竹县	510623	Zhongjiang Co. 中江县	510624	~~Guanghan Co.~~ 广汉县	510625	~~Shifang Co.~~ 什邡县
510626	~~Luojiang Co.~~ 罗江县								
510681	Guanghan city 广汉市	510682	Shifang city 什邡市	510683	Mianzhu city 绵竹市				
510700	Mianyang city 绵阳市								
510701	District 市辖区	510702	~~Shizhong~~ 市中区	510703	Fucheng 涪城区	510704	Youxian 游仙区	510705	Anzhou 安州区
510721	~~Jiangyou Co.~~ 江油县	510722	Santai Co. 三台县	510723	Yanting Co. 盐亭县	510724	~~An Co.~~ 安县	510725	Zitong Co. 梓潼县
510726	Beichuan Co. 北川县	510727	Pingwu Co. 平武县						
510781	Jiangyou city 江油市								
510800	Guangyuan city 广元市								
510801	District 市辖区	510802	Lizhou 利州区						
510801	District 市辖区			510811	Zhaohua 昭化区	510812	Chaotian 朝天区		
510821	Wangcang Co. 旺苍县	510822	Qingchuan Co. 青川县	510823	Jiange Co. 剑阁县	510824	Cangxi Co. 苍溪县		
510900	Suining city 遂宁市								
510901	District 市辖区	510902	~~Shizhong~~ 市中区	510903	Chuanshan 船山区	510904	Anju 安居区		
510921	Pengxi Co. 蓬溪县	510922	Shehong Co. 射洪县	510923	Daying Co. 大英县				
511000	Neijiang city 内江市								
511001	District 市辖区	511002	Shizhong 市中区						
511001	District 市辖区			511011	Dongxing 东兴区				
511021	~~Neijiang Co.~~ 内江县	511022	~~Lezhi Co.~~ 乐至县	511023	~~Anyue Co.~~ 安岳县	511024	Weiyuan Co. 威远县	511025	Zizhong Co. 资中县
511026	~~Ziyang Co.~~ 资阳县	511027	~~Jianyang Co.~~ 简阳县	511028	~~Longchang Co.~~ 隆昌县				
511081	~~Ziyang city~~ 资阳市	511082	~~Jianyang city~~ 简阳市	511083	Longchang city 隆昌市				
511100	Leshan city 乐山市								
511101	District 市辖区	511102	Shizhong 市中区						
511101	District 市辖区			511111	Shawan 沙湾区	511112	Wutongqiao 五通桥区	511113	Jinkouhe 金口河区
511121	~~Renshou Co.~~ 仁寿县	511122	~~Meishan Co.~~ 眉山县	511123	Qianwei Co. 犍为县	511124	Jingyan Co. 井研县	511125	~~Emei Co.~~ 峨眉县
511126	Jiajiang Co. 夹江县	511127	~~Hongya Co.~~ 洪雅县	511128	~~Pengshan Co.~~ 彭山县	511129	Muchuan Co. 沐川县	511130	~~Qingshen Co.~~ 青神县
511131	~~Danling Co.~~ 丹棱县	511132	Ebian Co. 峨边县	511133	Mabian Co. 马边县				
511181	Emeishan city 峨眉山市								
511200	~~Wanxian city~~ 万县市								
511300	Nanchong city 南充市								
511301	District 市辖区	511302	Shunqing 顺庆区	511303	Gaoping 高坪区	511304	Jialing 嘉陵区		
511321	Nanbu Co. 南部县	511322	Yingshan Co. 营山县	511323	Peng'an Co. 蓬安县	511324	Yilong Co. 仪陇县	511325	Xichong Co. 西充县
511381	Langzhong city 阆中市								
511400	Meishan city 眉山市								
511401	District 市辖区	511402	Dongpo 东坡区	511403	Pengshan 彭山区				
511421	Renshou Co. 仁寿县	511422	~~Pengshan Co.~~ 彭山县	511423	Hongya Co. 洪雅县	511424	Danling Co. 丹棱县	511425	Qingshen Co. 青神县
511500	Yibin city 宜宾市								
511501	District 市辖区	511502	Cuiping 翠屏区	511503	Nanxi 南溪区	511504	Xuzhou 叙州区		
511521	~~Yibin Co.~~ 宜宾县	511522	~~Nanxi Co.~~ 南溪县	511523	Jiang'an Co. 江安县	511524	Changning Co. 长宁县	511525	Gao Co. 高县
511526	Gong Co. 珙县	511527	Junlian Co. 筠连县	511528	Xingwen Co. 兴文县	511529	Pingshan Co. 屏山县		
511600	Guang'an city 广安市								
511601	District 市辖区	511602	Guang'an 广安区	511603	Qianfeng 前锋区				
511621	Yuechi Co. 岳池县	511622	Wusheng Co. 武胜县	511623	Linshui Co. 邻水县				
511681	Huaying city 华蓥市								
511700	Dazhou city 达州市								
511701	District 市辖区	511702	Tongchuan 通川区	511703	Dachuan 达川区				
511721	~~Da Co.~~ 达县	511722	Xuanhan Co. 宣汉县	511723	Kaijiang Co. 开江县	511724	Dazhu Co. 大竹县	511725	Qu Co. 渠县
511781	Wanyuan city 万源市								
511800	Ya'an city 雅安市								
511801	District 市辖区	511802	Yucheng 雨城区	511803	Mingshan 名山区				
511821	~~Mingshan Co.~~ 名山县	511822	Yingjing Co. 荥经县	511823	Hanyuan Co. 汉源县	511824	Shimian Co. 石棉县	511825	Tianquan Co. 天全县
511826	Lushan Co. 芦山县	511827	Baoxing Co. 宝兴县						
511900	Bazhong city 巴中市								
511901	District 市辖区	511902	Bazhou 巴州区	511903	Enyang 恩阳区				
511921	Tongjiang Co. 通江县	511922	Nanjiang Co. 南江县	511923	Pingchang Co. 平昌县				
512000	Ziyang city 资阳市								
512001	District 市辖区	512002	Yanjiang 雁江区						
512021	Lezhi Co. 乐至县	512022	Anyue Co. 安岳县						
512081	~~Jianyang city~~ 简阳市								
512100	~~Wenjiang Prefecture~~ 温江地区								
512200	~~Wanxian Prefecture~~ 万县地区								
512300	~~Fuling Prefecture~~ 涪陵地区								
512400	~~Yongchuan Prefecture~~ 永川地区								
512500	~~Yibin Prefecture~~ 宜宾地区								
512600	~~Mianyang Prefecture~~ 绵阳地区								
512700	~~Neijiang Prefecture~~ 内江地区								
512800	~~Leshan Prefecture~~ 乐山地区								
512900	~~Nanchong Prefecture~~ 南充地区								
513000	~~Dachuan Prefecture~~ 达川地区								
513100	~~Ya'an Prefecture~~ 雅安地区								
513200	Aba Prefecture 阿坝州								
513201	Ma'erkang city 马尔康市								
513221	Wenchuan Co. 汶川县	513222	Li Co. 理县	513223	Mao Co. 茂县	513224	Songpan Co. 松潘县	513225	Jiuzhaigou Co. 九寨沟县
513226	Jinchuan Co. 金川县	513227	Xiaojin Co. 小金县	513228	Heishui Co. 黑水县	513229	~~Ma'erkang Co.~~ 马尔康县	513230	Rangtang Co. 壤塘县
513231	Aba Co. 阿坝县	513232	Ruo'ergai Co. 若尔盖县	513233	Hongyuan Co. 红原县				
513300	Ganzi Prefecture 甘孜州								
513301	Kangding city 康定市								
513321	~~Kangding Co.~~ 康定县	513322	Luding Co. 泸定县	513323	Danba Co. 丹巴县	513324	Jiulong Co. 九龙县	513325	Yajiang Co. 雅江县
513326	Dawu Co. 道孚县	513327	Luhuo Co. 炉霍县	513328	Ganzi Co. 甘孜县	513329	Xinlong Co. 新龙县	513330	Dege Co. 德格县
513331	Baiyu Co. 白玉县	513332	Shiqu Co. 石渠县	513333	Seda Co. 色达县	513334	Litang Co. 理塘县	513335	Batang Co. 巴塘县
513436	Xiangcheng Co. 乡城县	513437	Daocheng Co. 稻城县	513438	Derong Co. 得荣县				
513400	Liangshan Prefecture 凉山州								
513406	Xichang city 西昌市								
513421	~~Xichang Co.~~ 西昌县	513422	Muli Co. 木里县	513423	Yanyuan Co. 盐源县	513424	Dechang Co. 德昌县	513425	Huili Co. 会理县
513426	Huidong Co. 会东县	513427	Ningnan Co. 宁南县	513428	Puge Co. 普格县	513429	Butuo Co. 布拖县	513430	Jinyang Co. 金阳县
513431	Zhaojue Co. 昭觉县	513432	Xide Co. 喜德县	513433	Mianning Co. 冕宁县	513434	Yuexi Co. 越西县	513435	Ganluo Co. 甘洛县
513436	Meigu Co. 美姑县	513437	Leibo Co. 雷波县	513438	~~Mili Co.~~ 米里县	513439	~~Mianning Co.~~ 冕宁县		
513500	~~Qianjiang Prefecture~~ 黔江地区								
513600	~~Guang'an Prefecture~~ 广安地区								
513700	~~Bazhong Prefecture~~ 巴中地区								
513800	~~Meishan Prefecture~~ 眉山地区								
513900	~~Ziyang Prefecture~~ 资阳地区								
514000	~~Xichang Prefecture~~ 西昌地区								
519000	~~Direct administration~~ 省直辖								
519001	~~Guanghan city~~ 广汉市	519002	~~Jiangyou city~~ 江油市	519003	~~Dujiangyan city~~ 都江堰市	519004	~~Emeishan city~~ 峨眉山市		

== Guizhou (52) ==
520000	Guizhou Province 贵州省								
520100	Guiyang city 贵阳市								
520101	District 市辖区	520102	Nanming 南明区	520103	Yunyan 云岩区				
520101	District 市辖区			520111	Huaxi 花溪区	520112	Wudang 乌当区	520113	Baiyun 白云区
520101	District 市辖区	520114	~~Xiaohe~~ 小河区	520115	Guanshanhu 观山湖区				
520121	Kaiyang Co. 开阳县	520122	Xifeng Co. 息烽县	520123	Xiuwen Co. 修文县				
520181	Qingzhen city 清镇市								
520200	Liupanshui city 六盘水市								
520201	Zhongshan 钟山区	520202	~~Panxian~~ 盘县特区	520203	Liuzhi 六枝特区	520204	~~Liuzhi~~ 六枝特区		
520221	Shuicheng Co. 水城县	520222	~~Pan Co.~~ 盘县						
520281	Panzhou city 盘州市								
520300	Zunyi city 遵义市								
520301	District 市辖区	520302	Honghuagang 红花岗区	520303	Huichuan 汇川区	520304	Bozhou 播州区		
520321	~~Bozhou Co.~~ 播州县	520322	Tongzi Co. 桐梓县	520323	Suiyang Co. 绥阳县	520324	Zheng'an Co. 正安县	520325	Daozhen Co. 道真县
520326	Wuchuan Co. 务川县	520327	Fenggang Co. 凤冈县	520328	Meitan Co. 湄潭县	520329	Yuqing Co. 余庆县	520330	Xishui Co. 习水县
520381	Chishui city 赤水市	520382	Renhuai city 仁怀市						
520400	Anshun city 安顺市								
520401	District 市辖区	520402	Xixiu 西秀区	520403	Pingba 平坝区				
520421	~~Pingba Co.~~ 平坝县	520422	Puding Co. 普定县	520423	Zhenning Co. 镇宁县	520424	Guanling Co. 关岭县	520425	Ziyun Co. 紫云县
520500	Bijie city 毕节市								
520501	District 市辖区	520502	Qixingguan 七星关区						
520521	Dafang Co. 大方县	520522	Qianxi Co. 黔西县	520523	Jinsha Co. 金沙县	520524	Zhijin Co. 织金县	520525	Nayong Co. 纳雍县
520526	Weining Co. 威宁县	520527	Hezhang Co. 赫章县						
520600	Tongren city 铜仁市								
520601	District 市辖区	520602	Bijiang 碧江区	520603	Wanshan 万山区				
520621	Jiangkou Co. 江口县	520622	Yuping Co. 玉屏县	520623	Shiqian Co. 石阡县	520624	Sinan Co. 思南县	520625	Yinjiang Co. 印江县
520626	Dejiang Co. 德江县	520627	Yanhe Co. 沿河县	520628	Songtao Co. 松桃县				
522100	~~Zunyi Prefecture~~ 遵义地区								
522200	~~Tongren Prefecture~~ 铜仁地区								
522300	Qianxinan Prefecture 黔西南州								
522301	Xingyi city 兴义市								
522321	~~Xingyi Co.~~ 兴义县	522322	Xingren Co. 兴仁县	522323	Pu'an Co. 普安县	522324	Qinglong Co. 晴隆县	522325	Zhenfeng Co. 贞丰县
522326	Wangmo Co. 望谟县	522327	Ceheng Co. 册亨县	522328	Anlong Co. 安龙县				
522400	~~Bijie Prefecture~~ 毕节地区								
522500	~~Anshun Prefecture~~ 安顺地区								
522600	Qiandongnan Prefecture 黔东南州								
522601	Kaili city 凯里市								
522621	~~Kaili Co.~~ 凯里县	522622	Huangping Co. 黄平县	522623	Shibing Co. 施秉县	522624	Sansui Co. 三穗县	522625	Zhenyuan Co. 镇远县
522626	Cengong Co. 岑巩县	522627	Tianzhu Co. 天柱县	522628	Jinping Co. 锦屏县	522629	Jianhe Co. 剑河县	522630	Taijiang Co. 台江县
522631	Liping Co. 黎平县	522632	Rongjiang Co. 榕江县	522633	Congjiang Co. 从江县	522634	Leishan Co. 雷山县	522635	Majiang Co. 麻江县
522636	Danzhai 丹寨县								
522700	Qiannan Prefecture 黔南州								
522701	Duyun city 都匀市	522702	Fuquan city 福泉市						
522721	~~Duyun Co.~~ 都匀县	522722	Libo Co. 荔波县	522723	Guiding Co. 贵定县	522724	~~Fuquan Co.~~ 福泉县	522725	Weng'an Co. 瓮安县
522726	Dushan Co. 独山县	522727	Pingtang Co. 平塘县	522728	Luodian Co. 罗甸县	522729	Changshun Co. 长顺县	522730	Longli Co. 龙里县
522731	Huishui Co. 惠水县	522732	Sandu Co. 三都县						
522800	~~Liupanshui Prefecture~~ 六盘水地区								
522900	~~Xingyi Prefecture~~ 兴义地区								

== Yunnan (53) ==
530000	Yunnan Province 云南省								
530100	Kunming city 昆明市								
530101	District 市辖区	530102	Wuhua 五华区	530103	Panlong 盘龙区				
530101	District 市辖区			530111	Guandu 官渡区	530112	Xishan 西山区	530113	Dongchuan 东川区
530101	District 市辖区	530114	Chenggong 呈贡区	530115	Jinning 晋宁区				
530101	District 市辖区					530120	~~Shi~~ 市区		
530121	~~Chenggong Co.~~ 呈贡县	530122	~~Jinning Co.~~ 晋宁县	530123	~~Anning Co.~~ 安宁县	530124	Fumin Co. 富民县	530125	Yiliang Co. 宜良县
530126	Shilin Co. 石林县	530127	Songming Co. 嵩明县	530128	Luquan Co. 禄劝县	530129	Xundian Co. 寻甸县		
530181	Anning city 安宁市								
530200	~~Dongchuan city~~ 东川市								
530300	Qujing city 曲靖市								
530301	District 市辖区	530302	Qilin 麒麟区	530303	Zhanyi 沾益区	530304	Malong 马龙区		
530321	~~Malong Co.~~ 马龙县	530322	Luliang Co. 陆良县	530323	Shizong Co. 师宗县	530324	Luoping Co. 罗平县	530325	Fuyuan Co. 富源县
530326	Huize Co. 会泽县	530327	~~Xundian Co.~~ 寻甸县	530328	~~Zhanyi Co.~~ 沾益县				
530381	Xuanwei city 宣威市								
530400	Yuxi city 玉溪市								
530401	District 市辖区	530402	Hongta 红塔区	530403	Jiangchuan 江川区				
530421	~~Jiangchuan Co.~~ 江川县	530422	Chengjiang Co. 澄江县	530423	Tonghai Co. 通海县	530424	Huaning Co. 华宁县	530425	Yimen Co. 易门县
530426	Eshan Co. 峨山县	530427	Xinping Co. 新平县	530428	Yuanjiang Co. 元江县				
530500	Baoshan city 保山市								
530501	District 市辖区	530502	Longyang 隆阳区						
530521	Shidian Co. 施甸县	530522	~~Tengchong Co.~~ 腾冲县	530523	Longling Co. 龙陵县	530524	Changning Co. 昌宁县		
530581	Tengchong city 腾冲市								
530600	Zhaotong city 昭通市								
530601	District 市辖区	530602	Zhaoyang 昭阳区						
530621	Ludian Co. 鲁甸县	530622	Qiaojia Co. 巧家县	530623	Yanjin Co. 盐津县	530624	Daguan Co. 大关县	530625	Yongshan Co. 永善县
530626	Suijiang Co. 绥江县	530627	Zhenxiong Co. 镇雄县	530628	Yiliang Co. 彝良县	530629	Weixin Co. 威信县	530630	Shuifu Co. 水富县
530700	Lijiang city 丽江市								
530701	District 市辖区	530702	Gucheng 古城区						
530721	Yulong Co. 玉龙县	530722	Yongsheng Co. 永胜县	530723	Huaping Co. 华坪县	530724	Ninglang Co. 宁蒗县		
530800	Pu'er city 普洱市								
530801	District 市辖区	530802	Simao 思茅区						
530821	Ning'er Co. 宁洱县	530822	Mojiang Co. 墨江县	530823	Jingdong Co. 景东县	530824	Jinggu Co. 景谷县	530825	Zhenyuan Co. 镇沅县
530826	Jiangcheng Co. 江城县	530827	Menglian Co. 孟连县	530828	Lancang Co. 澜沧县	530829	Ximeng Co. 西盟县		
530900	Lincang city 临沧市								
530901	District 市辖区	530902	Linxiang 临翔区						
530921	Fengqing Co. 凤庆县	530922	Yun Co. 云县	530923	Yongde Co. 永德县	530924	Zhenkang Co. 镇康县	530925	Shuangjiang Co. 双江县
530926	Gengma Co. 耿马县	530927	Cangyuan Co. 沧源县						
532100	~~Zhaotong Prefecture~~ 昭通地区								
532200	~~Qujing Prefecture~~ 曲靖地区								
532300	Chuxiong Prefecture 楚雄州								
532301	Chuxiong city 楚雄市								
532321	~~Chuxiong Co.~~ 楚雄县	532322	Shuangbai Co. 双柏县	532323	Mouding Co. 牟定县	532324	Nanhua Co. 南华县	532325	Yao'an Co. 姚安县
532326	Dayao Co. 大姚县	532327	Yongren Co. 永仁县	532328	Yuanmou Co. 元谋县	532329	Wuding Co. 武定县	532330	~~Luquan Co.~~ 禄劝县
532331	Lufeng Co. 禄丰县								
532400	~~Yuxi Prefecture~~ 玉溪地区								
532500	Honghe Prefecture 红河州								
532501	Gejiu city 个旧市	532502	Kaiyuan city 开远市	532503	Mengzi city 蒙自市	532504	Mile city 弥勒市		
532521	~~Kaiyuan Co.~~ 开远县	532522	~~Mengzi Co.~~ 蒙自县	532523	Pingbian Co. 屏边县	532524	Jianshui Co. 建水县	532525	Shiping Co. 石屏县
532526	~~Mile Co.~~ 弥勒县	532527	Luxi Co. 泸西县	532528	Yuanyang Co. 元阳县	532529	Honghe Co. 红河县	532530	Jinping Co. 金平县
532531	Lüchun Co. 绿春县	532532	Hekou Co. 河口县						
532600	Wenshan Prefecture 文山州								
532601	Wenshan city 文山市								
532621	~~Wenshan Co.~~ 文山县	532622	Yanshan Co. 砚山县	532623	Xichou Co. 西畴县	532624	Malipo Co. 麻栗坡县	532625	Maguan Co. 马关县
532626	Qiubei Co. 丘北县	532627	Guangnan Co. 广南县	532628	Funing Co. 富宁县				
532700	~~Simao Prefecture~~ 思茅地区								
532800	Xishuangbanna Prefecture 西双版纳州								
532801	Jinghong city 景洪市								
532821	~~Jinghong Co.~~ 景洪县	532822	Menghai Co. 勐海县	532823	Mengla Co. 勐腊县				
532900	Dali Prefecture 大理州								
532901	Dali city 大理市								
532921	~~Dali Co.~~ 大理县	532922	Yangbi Co. 漾濞县	532923	Xiangyun Co. 祥云县	532924	Binchuan Co. 宾川县	532925	Midu Co. 弥渡县
532926	Nanjian Co. 南涧县	532927	Weishan Co. 巍山县	532928	Yongping Co. 永平县	532929	Yunlong Co. 云龙县	532930	Eryuan Co. 洱源县
532931	Jianchuan Co. 剑川县	532932	Heqing Co. 鹤庆县						
533000	~~Baoshan Prefecture~~ 保山地区								
533100	Dehong Prefecture 德宏州								
533101	~~Wanding city~~ 畹町市	533102	Ruili city 瑞丽市	533103	Mangshi city 芒市				
533121	~~Luxi Co.~~ 潞西县	533122	Lianghe Co. 梁河县	533123	Yingjiang Co. 盈江县	533124	Longchuan Co. 陇川县	533125	~~Ruili Co.~~ 瑞丽县
533126	~~Wanding Co.~~ 畹町县								
533200	~~Lijiang Prefecture~~ 丽江地区								
533300	Nujiang Prefecture 怒江州								
533301	Lushui city 泸水市								
533321	~~Lushui Co.~~ 泸水县	533322	~~Bijiang Co.~~ 碧江县	533323	Fugong Co. 福贡县	533324	Gongshan Co. 贡山县	533325	Lanping Co. 兰坪县
533400	Dêqên Prefecture 迪庆州								
533401	Xianggelila city 香格里拉市								
533421	~~Xianggelila Co.~~ 香格里拉县	533422	Deqin Co. 德钦县	533423	Weixi Co. 维西县				
533500	~~Lincang Prefecture~~ 临沧地区								

== Tibet (54) ==
540000	Tibet AR 西藏自治区								
540100	Lhasa city 拉萨市								
540101	District 市辖区	540102	Chengguan 城关区	540103	Doilungdêqên 堆龙德庆区	540104	Dagzê 达孜区		
540101	District 市辖区					540120	~~Shi~~ 市区		
540121	Lhünzhub Co. 林周县	540122	Damxung Co. 当雄县	540123	Nyêmo Co. 尼木县	540124	Qüxü Co. 曲水县	540125	~~Doilungdêqên Co.~~ 堆龙德庆县
540126	~~Dagzê Co.~~ 达孜县	540127	Maizhokunggar Co. 墨竹工卡县	540128	~~Gongbo'gyamda Co.~~ 工布江达县	540129	~~Nyingchi Co.~~ 林芝县	540130	~~Mainling Co.~~ 米林县
540131	~~Mêdog Co.~~ 墨脱县								
540200	Xigazê city 日喀则市								
540201	District 市辖区	540202	Samzhubzê 桑珠孜区						
540221	Namling Co. 南木林县	540222	Gyangzê Co. 江孜县	540223	Tingri Co. 定日县	540224	Sa'gya Co. 萨迦县	540225	Lhazê Co. 拉孜县
540226	Ngamring Co. 昂仁县	540227	Xaitongmoin Co. 谢通门县	540228	Bainang Co. 白朗县	540229	Rinbung Co. 仁布县	540230	Kangmar Co. 康马县
540231	Dinggyê Co. 定结县	540232	Zhongba Co. 仲巴县	540233	Yadong Co. 亚东县	540234	Gyirong Co. 吉隆县	540235	Nyalam Co. 聂拉木县
540236	Saga Co. 萨嘎县	540237	Gamba Co. 岗巴县						
540300	Qamdo city 昌都市								
540301	District 市辖区	540302	Karub 卡若区						
540321	Jomda Co. 江达县	540322	Gonjo Co. 贡觉县	540323	Riwoqê Co. 类乌齐县	540324	Dêngqên Co. 丁青县	540325	Zhag'yab Co. 察雅县
540326	Baxoi Co. 八宿县	540327	Zogang Co. 左贡县	540328	Markam Co. 芒康县	540329	Lhorong Co. 洛隆县	540330	Banbar Co. 边坝县
540400	Nyingchi city 林芝市								
540401	District 市辖区	540402	Bayi 巴宜区						
540421	Gongbo'gyamda Co. 工布江达县	540422	Mainling Co. 米林县	540423	Mêdog Co. 墨脱县	540424	Bomê Co. 波密县	540425	Zayü Co. 察隅县
540426	Nang Co. 朗县								
540500	Shannan city 山南市								
540501	District 市辖区	540502	Nêdong 乃东区						
540521	Zhanang Co. 扎囊县	540522	Gonggar Co. 贡嘎县	540523	Sangri Co. 桑日县	540524	Qonggyai Co. 琼结县	540525	Qusum Co. 曲松县
540526	Comai Co. 措美县	540527	Lhozhag Co. 洛扎县	540528	Gyaca Co. 加查县	540529	Lhünzê Co. 隆子县	540530	Cona Co. 错那县
540531	Nagarzê Co. 浪卡子县								
540600	Nagqu city 那曲市								
540601	District 市辖区	540602	Seni 色尼区						
540621	Lhari Co. 嘉黎县	540622	Biru Co. 比如县	540623	Nyainrong Co. 聂荣县	540624	Amdo Co. 安多县	540625	Xainza Co. 申扎县
540626	Sog Co. 索县	540627	Baingoin Co. 班戈县	540628	Baqên Co. 巴青县	542429	Nyima Co. 尼玛县	540630	Shuanghu Co. 双湖县
542100	~~Qamdo Prefecture~~ 昌都地区								
542200	~~Shannan Prefecture~~ 山南地区								
542300	~~Xigazê Prefecture~~ 日喀则地区								
542400	~~Nagqu Prefecture~~ 那曲地区								
542500	Ngari Prefecture 阿里地区								
542521	Burang Co. 普兰县	542522	Zanda Co. 札达县	542523	Gar Co. 噶尔县	542524	Rutog Co. 日土县	542525	Gê'gyai Co. 革吉县
542526	Gêrzê Co. 改则县	542527	Coqên Co. 措勤县	542528	~~Lunggar Co.~~ 隆格尔县				
542600	~~Nyingchi Prefecture~~ 林芝地区								
542700	~~Gyangzê Prefecture~~ 江孜地区								
