= List of administrative divisions of Sichuan =

Overview of the administrative divisions in Sichuan

Sichuan Province
- Province
- Capital: Chengdu

Prefecture-level divisions
- Sub-provincial cities: 1
- Prefectural cities: 17
- Autonomous prefectures: 3
- Administrative regions: 1

County level divisions
- County cities: 18
- Counties: 107
- Autonomous counties: 4
- Districts: 54

Township level divisions
- Towns: 1,865
- Townships: 2,586
- Ethnic townships: 93
- Subdistricts: 238

Villages level divisions
- Communities: 7,202
- Administrative villages: 45,867

Sichuan, a province of the People's Republic of China, is made up of the following administrative divisions. In addition, the Wolong Special Administrative Region is administered separately by the Forestry Department of Sichuan.

== Administrative divisions ==
These administrative divisions are explained in greater detail at administrative divisions of China. The following table lists only the prefecture-level and county-level divisions of Sichuan.

Prefecture level	County Level				
Prefecture level	Name	Chinese	Hanyu Pinyin	Division code	
Chengdu city 成都市; Chéngdū Shì (Capital – Sub-provincial) (5101 / CTU)	Jinjiang District	锦江区	Jǐnjiāng Qū	510104	JJQ
Chengdu city 成都市; Chéngdū Shì (Capital – Sub-provincial) (5101 / CTU)	Qingyang District	青羊区	Qīngyáng Qū	510105	QYQ
Chengdu city 成都市; Chéngdū Shì (Capital – Sub-provincial) (5101 / CTU)	Jinniu District	金牛区	Jīnniú Qū	510106	JNU
Chengdu city 成都市; Chéngdū Shì (Capital – Sub-provincial) (5101 / CTU)	Wuhou District	武侯区	Wǔhóu Qū	510107	WHQ
Chengdu city 成都市; Chéngdū Shì (Capital – Sub-provincial) (5101 / CTU)	Chenghua District	成华区	Chénghuá Qū	510108	CHQ
Chengdu city 成都市; Chéngdū Shì (Capital – Sub-provincial) (5101 / CTU)	Longquanyi District	龙泉驿区	Lóngquányì Qū	510112	LQY
Chengdu city 成都市; Chéngdū Shì (Capital – Sub-provincial) (5101 / CTU)	Qingbaijiang District	青白江区	Qīngbáijiāng Qū	510113	QBJ
Chengdu city 成都市; Chéngdū Shì (Capital – Sub-provincial) (5101 / CTU)	Xindu District	新都区	Xīndū Qū	510114	XDU
Chengdu city 成都市; Chéngdū Shì (Capital – Sub-provincial) (5101 / CTU)	Wenjiang District	温江区	Wēnjiāng Qū	510115	WNJ
Chengdu city 成都市; Chéngdū Shì (Capital – Sub-provincial) (5101 / CTU)	Shuangliu District	双流区	Shuāngliú Qū	510116	SLA
Chengdu city 成都市; Chéngdū Shì (Capital – Sub-provincial) (5101 / CTU)	Pidu District	郫都区	Pídū Qū	510117	PID
Chengdu city 成都市; Chéngdū Shì (Capital – Sub-provincial) (5101 / CTU)	Xinjin District	新津区	Xīnjīn Qū	510118	
Chengdu city 成都市; Chéngdū Shì (Capital – Sub-provincial) (5101 / CTU)	Jintang County	金堂县	Jīntáng Xiàn	510121	JNT
Chengdu city 成都市; Chéngdū Shì (Capital – Sub-provincial) (5101 / CTU)	Dayi County	大邑县	Dàyì Xiàn	510129	DYI
Chengdu city 成都市; Chéngdū Shì (Capital – Sub-provincial) (5101 / CTU)	Pujiang County	蒲江县	Pújiāng Xiàn	510131	PJX
Chengdu city 成都市; Chéngdū Shì (Capital – Sub-provincial) (5101 / CTU)	Dujiangyan city	都江堰市	Dūjiāngyàn Shì	510181	DJY
Chengdu city 成都市; Chéngdū Shì (Capital – Sub-provincial) (5101 / CTU)	Pengzhou city	彭州市	Péngzhōu Shì	510182	PZS
Chengdu city 成都市; Chéngdū Shì (Capital – Sub-provincial) (5101 / CTU)	Qionglai city	邛崃市	Qiónglái Shì	510183	QLA
Chengdu city 成都市; Chéngdū Shì (Capital – Sub-provincial) (5101 / CTU)	Chongzhou city	崇州市	Chóngzhōu Shì	510184	CZO
Chengdu city 成都市; Chéngdū Shì (Capital – Sub-provincial) (5101 / CTU)	Jianyang city	简阳市	Jiǎnyáng Shì	510185	JYC
Zigong city 自贡市; Zìgòng Shì (5103 / ZGS)	Ziliujing District	自流井区	Zìliújǐng Qū	510302	ZLJ
Zigong city 自贡市; Zìgòng Shì (5103 / ZGS)	Gongjing District	贡井区	Gòngjǐng Qū	510303	GJQ
Zigong city 自贡市; Zìgòng Shì (5103 / ZGS)	Da'an District	大安区	Dà'ān Qū	510304	DAQ
Zigong city 自贡市; Zìgòng Shì (5103 / ZGS)	Yantan District	沿滩区	Yántān Qū	510311	YTN
Zigong city 自贡市; Zìgòng Shì (5103 / ZGS)	Rongxian County (Note: Official name registered by the Ministry of Civil Affairs.)	荣县	Róngxiàn	510321	RGX
Zigong city 自贡市; Zìgòng Shì (5103 / ZGS)	Fushun County	富顺县	Fùshùn Xiàn	510322	FSH
Panzhihua city 攀枝花市; Pānzhīhuā Shì (5104 / PZH)	Dongqu District	东区	Dōngqū	510402	DQP
Panzhihua city 攀枝花市; Pānzhīhuā Shì (5104 / PZH)	Xiqu District	西区	Xīqū	510403	XIQ
Panzhihua city 攀枝花市; Pānzhīhuā Shì (5104 / PZH)	Renhe District	仁和区	Rénhé Qū	510411	RHQ
Panzhihua city 攀枝花市; Pānzhīhuā Shì (5104 / PZH)	Miyi County	米易县	Mǐyì Xiàn	510421	MIY
Panzhihua city 攀枝花市; Pānzhīhuā Shì (5104 / PZH)	Yanbian County	盐边县	Yánbiān Xiàn	510422	YBN
Luzhou city 泸州市; Lúzhōu Shì (5105 / LUZ)	Jiangyang District	江阳区	Jiāngyáng Qū	510502	JYB
Luzhou city 泸州市; Lúzhōu Shì (5105 / LUZ)	Naxi District	纳溪区	Nàxī Qū	510503	NXI
Luzhou city 泸州市; Lúzhōu Shì (5105 / LUZ)	Longmatan District	龙马潭区	Lóngmǎtán Qū	510504	LMT
Luzhou city 泸州市; Lúzhōu Shì (5105 / LUZ)	Luxian County	泸县	Lúxiàn	510521	LUX
Luzhou city 泸州市; Lúzhōu Shì (5105 / LUZ)	Hejiang County	合江县	Héjiāng Xiàn	510522	HEJ
Luzhou city 泸州市; Lúzhōu Shì (5105 / LUZ)	Xuyong County	叙永县	Xùyǒng Xiàn	510524	XYO
Luzhou city 泸州市; Lúzhōu Shì (5105 / LUZ)	Gulin County	古蔺县	Gǔlìn Xiàn	510525	GUL
Deyang city 德阳市; Déyáng Shì (5106 / DEY)	Jingyang District	旌阳区	Jīngyáng Qū	510603	JYF
Deyang city 德阳市; Déyáng Shì (5106 / DEY)	Luojiang District	罗江区	Luójiāng Qū	510604	
Deyang city 德阳市; Déyáng Shì (5106 / DEY)	Zhongjiang County	中江县	Zhōngjiāng Xiàn	510623	ZGJ
Deyang city 德阳市; Déyáng Shì (5106 / DEY)	Guanghan city	广汉市	Guǎnghàn Shì	510681	GHN
Deyang city 德阳市; Déyáng Shì (5106 / DEY)	Shifang city	什邡市	Shífāng Shì	510682	SFS
Deyang city 德阳市; Déyáng Shì (5106 / DEY)	Mianzhu city	绵竹市	Miánzhú Shì	510683	MZU
Mianyang city 绵阳市; Miányáng Shì (5107 / MYG)	Fucheng District	涪城区	Fúchéng Qū	510703	FCM
Mianyang city 绵阳市; Miányáng Shì (5107 / MYG)	Youxian District	游仙区	Yóuxiān Qū	510704	YXM
Mianyang city 绵阳市; Miányáng Shì (5107 / MYG)	Anzhou District	安州区	Ānzhōu Qū	510705	AZU
Mianyang city 绵阳市; Miányáng Shì (5107 / MYG)	Santai County	三台县	Sāntái Xiàn	510722	SNT
Mianyang city 绵阳市; Miányáng Shì (5107 / MYG)	Yanting County	盐亭县	Yántíng Xiàn	510723	YTC
Mianyang city 绵阳市; Miányáng Shì (5107 / MYG)	Zitong County	梓潼县	Zǐtóng Xiàn	510725	ZTG
Mianyang city 绵阳市; Miányáng Shì (5107 / MYG)	Beichuan County (Note: Conventional name: Beichuan Qiang Autonomous County; Chinese: 北川羌族自治县; pinyin: Běichuān Qiāngzú Zìzhìxiàn)	北川县	Běichuān Xiàn	510726	BCN
Mianyang city 绵阳市; Miányáng Shì (5107 / MYG)	Pingwu County	平武县	Píngwǔ Xiàn	510727	PWU
Mianyang city 绵阳市; Miányáng Shì (5107 / MYG)	Jiangyou city	江油市	Jiāngyóu Shì	510781	JYO
Guangyuan city 广元市; Guǎngyuán Shì (5108 / GYC)	Lizhou District	利州区	Lìzhōu Qū	510802	LZS
Guangyuan city 广元市; Guǎngyuán Shì (5108 / GYC)	Zhaohua District	昭化区	Zhāohuà Qū	510811	ZHO
Guangyuan city 广元市; Guǎngyuán Shì (5108 / GYC)	Chaotian District	朝天区	Cháotiān Qū	510812	CTN
Guangyuan city 广元市; Guǎngyuán Shì (5108 / GYC)	Wangcang County	旺苍县	Wàngcāng Xiàn	510821	WGC
Guangyuan city 广元市; Guǎngyuán Shì (5108 / GYC)	Qingchuan County	青川县	Qīngchuān Xiàn	510822	QCX
Guangyuan city 广元市; Guǎngyuán Shì (5108 / GYC)	Jiange County	剑阁县	Jiàngé Xiàn	510823	JGE
Guangyuan city 广元市; Guǎngyuán Shì (5108 / GYC)	Cangxi County	苍溪县	Cāngxī Xiàn	510824	CXC
Suining city 遂宁市; Sùiníng Shì (5109 / SNS)	Chuanshan District	船山区	Chuánshān Qū	510903	CUS
Suining city 遂宁市; Sùiníng Shì (5109 / SNS)	Anju District	安居区	Ānjū Qū	510904	AJQ
Suining city 遂宁市; Sùiníng Shì (5109 / SNS)	Pengxi County	蓬溪县	Péngxī Xiàn	510921	PXI
Suining city 遂宁市; Sùiníng Shì (5109 / SNS)	Daying County	大英县	Dàyīng Xiàn	510923	SHE
Suining city 遂宁市; Sùiníng Shì (5109 / SNS)	Shehong city	射洪市	Shèhóng shí	510981	DAY
Neijiang city 内江市; Nèijiāng Shì (5110 / NJS)	Shizhong District	市中区	Shìzhōng Qū	511002	SZM
Neijiang city 内江市; Nèijiāng Shì (5110 / NJS)	Dongxing District	东兴区	Dōngxīng Qū	511011	DXQ
Neijiang city 内江市; Nèijiāng Shì (5110 / NJS)	Weiyuan County	威远县	Wēiyuǎn Xiàn	511024	WYU
Neijiang city 内江市; Nèijiāng Shì (5110 / NJS)	Zizhong County	资中县	Zīzhōng Xiàn	511025	ZZC
Neijiang city 内江市; Nèijiāng Shì (5110 / NJS)	Longchang city	隆昌市	Lóngchāng Shì	511081	LCZ
Leshan city 乐山市; Lèshān Shì (5111 / LES)	Shizhong District	市中区	Shìzhōng Qū	511102	SZP
Leshan city 乐山市; Lèshān Shì (5111 / LES)	Shawan District	沙湾区	Shāwān Qū	511111	SWN
Leshan city 乐山市; Lèshān Shì (5111 / LES)	Wutongqiao District	五通桥区	Wǔtōngqiáo Qū	511112	WTQ
Leshan city 乐山市; Lèshān Shì (5111 / LES)	Jinkouhe District	金口河区	Jīnkǒuhé Qū	511113	JKH
Leshan city 乐山市; Lèshān Shì (5111 / LES)	Qianwei County	犍为县	Qiánwéi Xiàn	511123	QWE
Leshan city 乐山市; Lèshān Shì (5111 / LES)	Jingyan County	井研县	Jǐngyán Xiàn	511124	JYA
Leshan city 乐山市; Lèshān Shì (5111 / LES)	Jiajiang County	夹江县	Jiājiāng Xiàn	511126	JJC
Leshan city 乐山市; Lèshān Shì (5111 / LES)	Muchuan County	沐川县	Mùchuān Xiàn	511129	MCH
Leshan city 乐山市; Lèshān Shì (5111 / LES)	Ebian County (Note: Conventional name: Ebian Yi Autonomous County; Chinese: 峨边彝族自治县; pinyin: Ébiān Yízú Zìzhìxiàn)	峨边县	Ébiān Xiàn	511132	EBN
Leshan city 乐山市; Lèshān Shì (5111 / LES)	Mabian County (Note: Conventional name: Mabian Yi Autonomous County; Chinese: 马边彝族自治县; pinyin: Mǎbiān Yízú Zìzhìxiàn)	马边县	Mǎbiān Xiàn	511133	MBN
Leshan city 乐山市; Lèshān Shì (5111 / LES)	Emeishan city	峨眉山市	Éméishān Shì	511181	EMS
Nanchong city 南充市; Nánchōng Shì (5113 / NCO)	Shunqing District	顺庆区	Shùnqìng Qū	511302	SQG
Nanchong city 南充市; Nánchōng Shì (5113 / NCO)	Gaoping District	高坪区	Gāopíng Qū	511303	GPQ
Nanchong city 南充市; Nánchōng Shì (5113 / NCO)	Jialing District	嘉陵区	Jiālíng Qū	511304	JLG
Nanchong city 南充市; Nánchōng Shì (5113 / NCO)	Nanbu County	南部县	Nánbù Xiàn	511321	NBU
Nanchong city 南充市; Nánchōng Shì (5113 / NCO)	Yingshan County	营山县	Yíngshān Xiàn	511322	YGS
Nanchong city 南充市; Nánchōng Shì (5113 / NCO)	Peng'an County	蓬安县	Péng'ān Xiàn	511323	PGA
Nanchong city 南充市; Nánchōng Shì (5113 / NCO)	Yilong County	仪陇县	Yílǒng Xiàn	511324	YLC
Nanchong city 南充市; Nánchōng Shì (5113 / NCO)	Xichong County	西充县	Xīchōng Xiàn	511325	XCO
Nanchong city 南充市; Nánchōng Shì (5113 / NCO)	Langzhong city	阆中市	Lángzhōng Shì	511381	LZJ
Meishan city 眉山市; Méishān Shì (5114 / MSS)	Dongpo District	东坡区	Dōngpō Qū	511402	DPQ
Meishan city 眉山市; Méishān Shì (5114 / MSS)	Pengshan District	彭山区	Péngshān Qū	511403	PSQ
Meishan city 眉山市; Méishān Shì (5114 / MSS)	Renshou County	仁寿县	Rénshòu Xiàn	511421	RSO
Meishan city 眉山市; Méishān Shì (5114 / MSS)	Hongya County	洪雅县	Hóngyǎ Xiàn	511423	HGY
Meishan city 眉山市; Méishān Shì (5114 / MSS)	Danleng County	丹棱县	Dānléng Xiàn	511424	DLG
Meishan city 眉山市; Méishān Shì (5114 / MSS)	Qingshen County	青神县	Qīngshén Xiàn	511425	QSC
Yibin city 宜宾市; Yíbīn Shì (5115 / YBS)	Cuiping District	翠屏区	Cuìpíng Qū	511502	CPQ
Yibin city 宜宾市; Yíbīn Shì (5115 / YBS)	Nanxi District	南溪区	Nánxī Qū	511503	NXA
Yibin city 宜宾市; Yíbīn Shì (5115 / YBS)	Xuzhou District	叙州县	Xùzhōu Qū	511504	
Yibin city 宜宾市; Yíbīn Shì (5115 / YBS)	Jiang'an County	江安县	Jiāng'ān Xiàn	511523	JAC
Yibin city 宜宾市; Yíbīn Shì (5115 / YBS)	Changning County	长宁县	Chángníng Xiàn	511524	CNX
Yibin city 宜宾市; Yíbīn Shì (5115 / YBS)	Gaoxian County	高县	Gāoxiàn	511525	GAO
Yibin city 宜宾市; Yíbīn Shì (5115 / YBS)	Gongxian County	珙县	Gǒngxiàn	511526	GOG
Yibin city 宜宾市; Yíbīn Shì (5115 / YBS)	Junlian County	筠连县	Jūnlián Xiàn	511527	JNL
Yibin city 宜宾市; Yíbīn Shì (5115 / YBS)	Xingwen County	兴文县	Xīngwén Xiàn	511528	XWC
Yibin city 宜宾市; Yíbīn Shì (5115 / YBS)	Pingshan County	屏山县	Píngshān Xiàn	511529	PSC
Guang'an city 广安市; Guǎng'ān Shì (5116 / GAC)	Guang'an District	广安区	Guǎng'ān Qū	511602	GAQ
Guang'an city 广安市; Guǎng'ān Shì (5116 / GAC)	Qianfeng District	前锋区	Qiánfēng Qū	511603	QFQ
Guang'an city 广安市; Guǎng'ān Shì (5116 / GAC)	Yuechi County	岳池县	Yuèchí Xiàn	511621	YCC
Guang'an city 广安市; Guǎng'ān Shì (5116 / GAC)	Wusheng County	武胜县	Wǔshēng Xiàn	511622	WSG
Guang'an city 广安市; Guǎng'ān Shì (5116 / GAC)	Linshui County	邻水县	Línshuǐ Xiàn	511623	LSH
Guang'an city 广安市; Guǎng'ān Shì (5116 / GAC)	Huaying city	华蓥市	Huāyíng Shì	511681	HYC
Dazhou city 达州市; Dázhōu Shì (5117 / DAZ)	Tongchuan District	通川区	Tōngchuān Qū	511702	TCQ
Dazhou city 达州市; Dázhōu Shì (5117 / DAZ)	Dachuan District	达川区	Dáchuān Qū	511703	DCN
Dazhou city 达州市; Dázhōu Shì (5117 / DAZ)	Xuanhan County	宣汉县	Xuānhàn Xiàn	511722	XHC
Dazhou city 达州市; Dázhōu Shì (5117 / DAZ)	Kaijiang County	开江县	Kāijiāng Xiàn	511723	KJG
Dazhou city 达州市; Dázhōu Shì (5117 / DAZ)	Dazhu County	大竹县	Dàzhú Xiàn	511724	DZU
Dazhou city 达州市; Dázhōu Shì (5117 / DAZ)	Quxian County	渠县	Qúxiàn	511725	QXC
Dazhou city 达州市; Dázhōu Shì (5117 / DAZ)	Wanyuan city	万源市	Wànyuán Shì	511781	WYS
Ya'an city 雅安市; Yǎ'ān Shì (5118 / YAS)	Yucheng District	雨城区	Yǔchéng Qū	511802	YEU
Ya'an city 雅安市; Yǎ'ān Shì (5118 / YAS)	Mingshan District	名山区	Míngshān Qū	511803	MSG
Ya'an city 雅安市; Yǎ'ān Shì (5118 / YAS)	Yingjing County	荥经县	Yíngjīng Xiàn	511822	YJC
Ya'an city 雅安市; Yǎ'ān Shì (5118 / YAS)	Hanyuan County	汉源县	Hànyuán Xiàn	511823	HAY
Ya'an city 雅安市; Yǎ'ān Shì (5118 / YAS)	Shimian County	石棉县	Shímián Xiàn	511824	SIM
Ya'an city 雅安市; Yǎ'ān Shì (5118 / YAS)	Tianquan County	天全县	Tiānquán Xiàn	511825	TQU
Ya'an city 雅安市; Yǎ'ān Shì (5118 / YAS)	Lushan County	芦山县	Lúshān Xiàn	511826	LSC
Ya'an city 雅安市; Yǎ'ān Shì (5118 / YAS)	Baoxing County	宝兴县	Bǎoxīng Xiàn	511827	BXC
Bazhong city 巴中市; Bāzhōng Shì (5119 / BZS)	Bazhou District	巴州区	Bāzhōu Qū	511902	BZU
Bazhong city 巴中市; Bāzhōng Shì (5119 / BZS)	Enyang District	恩阳区	Ēnyáng Qū	511903	EYG
Bazhong city 巴中市; Bāzhōng Shì (5119 / BZS)	Tongjiang County	通江县	Tōngjiāng Xiàn	511921	TGJ
Bazhong city 巴中市; Bāzhōng Shì (5119 / BZS)	Nanjiang County	南江县	Nánjiāng Xiàn	511922	NJC
Bazhong city 巴中市; Bāzhōng Shì (5119 / BZS)	Pingchang County	平昌县	Píngchāng Xiàn	511923	PCG
Ziyang city 资阳市; Zīyáng Shì (5120 / ZYS)	Yanjiang District	雁江区	Yànjiāng Qū	512002	YIU
Ziyang city 资阳市; Zīyáng Shì (5120 / ZYS)	Lezhi County	乐至县	Lèzhì Xiàn	512021	AYU
Ziyang city 资阳市; Zīyáng Shì (5120 / ZYS)	Anyue County	安岳县	Ānyuè Xiàn	512022	LZC
Aba Prefecture (Note: Conventional name: Aba Tibetan and Qiang Autonomous Prefecture; Chinese: 阿坝藏族羌族自治州; pinyin: Ābà Zàngzú Qiāngzú Zìzhìzhōu) 阿坝州; Ābà Zhōu (5132 / ABA)	Ma'erkang city	马尔康市	Mǎ'ěrkāng Shì	513201	BKM
Aba Prefecture 阿坝州; Ābà Zhōu (5132 / ABA)	Wenchuan County (Note: Wolong Special Administrative Region (卧龙特别行政区; Wòlóng Tèbié Xíngzhèngqū) a special jurisdiction with prefectural level power. The special jurisdiction is located within Wenchuan County.)	汶川县	Wènchuān Xiàn	513221	WNC
Aba Prefecture 阿坝州; Ābà Zhōu (5132 / ABA)	Lixian County	理县	Lǐxiàn	513222	LXC
Aba Prefecture 阿坝州; Ābà Zhōu (5132 / ABA)	Maoxian County	茂县	Màoxiàn	513223	MAO
Aba Prefecture 阿坝州; Ābà Zhōu (5132 / ABA)	Songpan County	松潘县	Sōngpān Xiàn	513224	SOP
Aba Prefecture 阿坝州; Ābà Zhōu (5132 / ABA)	Jiuzhaigou County	九寨沟县	Jiǔzhàigōu Xiàn	513225	JZG
Aba Prefecture 阿坝州; Ābà Zhōu (5132 / ABA)	Jinchuan County	金川县	Jīnchuān Xiàn	513226	JCH
Aba Prefecture 阿坝州; Ābà Zhōu (5132 / ABA)	Xiaojin County	小金县	Xiǎojīn Xiàn	513227	XJX
Aba Prefecture 阿坝州; Ābà Zhōu (5132 / ABA)	Heishui County	黑水县	Hēishuǐ Xiàn	513228	HIS
Aba Prefecture 阿坝州; Ābà Zhōu (5132 / ABA)	Rangtang County	壤塘县	Rǎngtáng Xiàn	513230	ZAM
Aba Prefecture 阿坝州; Ābà Zhōu (5132 / ABA)	Aba County	阿坝县	Ābà Xiàn	513231	ABX
Aba Prefecture 阿坝州; Ābà Zhōu (5132 / ABA)	Ruo'ergai	若尔盖县	Ruò'ěrgài Xiàn	513232	ZOI
Aba Prefecture 阿坝州; Ābà Zhōu (5132 / ABA)	Hongyuan County	红原县	Hóngyuán Xiàn	513233	HOY
Ganzi Prefecture (Note: Conventional name: Ganzi Tibetan Autonomous Prefecture; Chinese: 甘孜藏族自治州; pinyin: Gānzī Zàngzú Zìzhìzhōu) 甘孜州; Gānzī Zhōu (5133 / GAZ)	Kangding city	康定市	Kāngdìng Shì	513301	KDG
Ganzi Prefecture 甘孜州; Gānzī Zhōu (5133 / GAZ)	Luding County	泸定县	Lúdìng Xiàn	513322	LUD
Ganzi Prefecture 甘孜州; Gānzī Zhōu (5133 / GAZ)	Danba County	丹巴县	Dānbā Xiàn	513323	DBA
Ganzi Prefecture 甘孜州; Gānzī Zhōu (5133 / GAZ)	Jiulong County	九龙县	Jiǔlóng Xiàn	513324	JLC
Ganzi Prefecture 甘孜州; Gānzī Zhōu (5133 / GAZ)	Yajiang County	雅江县	Yǎjiāng Xiàn	513325	YAJ
Ganzi Prefecture 甘孜州; Gānzī Zhōu (5133 / GAZ)	Daofu County	道孚县	Dàofú Xiàn	513326	DAW
Ganzi Prefecture 甘孜州; Gānzī Zhōu (5133 / GAZ)	Luhuo County	炉霍县	Lúhuò Xiàn	513327	LUH
Ganzi Prefecture 甘孜州; Gānzī Zhōu (5133 / GAZ)	Ganzi County	甘孜县	Gānzī Xiàn	513328	GRZ
Ganzi Prefecture 甘孜州; Gānzī Zhōu (5133 / GAZ)	Xinlong County	新龙县	Xīnlóng Xiàn	513329	XLG
Ganzi Prefecture 甘孜州; Gānzī Zhōu (5133 / GAZ)	Dege County	德格县	Dégé Xiàn	513330	DEG
Ganzi Prefecture 甘孜州; Gānzī Zhōu (5133 / GAZ)	Baiyu County	白玉县	Báiyù Xiàn	513331	BYC
Ganzi Prefecture 甘孜州; Gānzī Zhōu (5133 / GAZ)	Shiqu County	石渠县	Shíqú Xiàn	513332	SER
Ganzi Prefecture 甘孜州; Gānzī Zhōu (5133 / GAZ)	Seda County	色达县	Sèdá Xiàn	513333	STX
Ganzi Prefecture 甘孜州; Gānzī Zhōu (5133 / GAZ)	Litang County	理塘县	Lǐtáng Xiàn	513334	LIT
Ganzi Prefecture 甘孜州; Gānzī Zhōu (5133 / GAZ)	Batang County	巴塘县	Bātáng Xiàn	513335	BTC
Ganzi Prefecture 甘孜州; Gānzī Zhōu (5133 / GAZ)	Xiangcheng County	乡城县	Xiāngchéng Xiàn	513336	XCC
Ganzi Prefecture 甘孜州; Gānzī Zhōu (5133 / GAZ)	Daocheng County	稻城县	Dàochéng Xiàn	513337	DCX
Ganzi Prefecture 甘孜州; Gānzī Zhōu (5133 / GAZ)	Derong County	得荣县	Déróng Xiàn	513338	DER
Liangshan Prefecture (Note: Conventional name: Liangshan Yi Autonomous Prefecture; Chinese: 凉山彝族自治州; pinyin: Liángshān Yízú Zìzhìzhōu) 凉山州; Liángshān Zhōu (5134 / LSY)	Xichang City	西昌市	Xīchāng Shì	513401	XCA
Liangshan Prefecture 凉山州; Liángshān Zhōu (5134 / LSY)	Huili City	会理市	Huìlǐ Shì	513402	HLI
Liangshan Prefecture 凉山州; Liángshān Zhōu (5134 / LSY)	Muli County (Note: Conventional name: Muli Tibetan Autonomous County; Chinese: 木里藏族自治县; pinyin: Mùlǐ Zàngzú Zìzhìxiàn)	木里县	Mùlǐ Xiàn	513422	MLI
Liangshan Prefecture 凉山州; Liángshān Zhōu (5134 / LSY)	Yanyuan County	盐源县	Yányuán Xiàn	513423	YYU
Liangshan Prefecture 凉山州; Liángshān Zhōu (5134 / LSY)	Dechang County	德昌县	Déchāng Xiàn	513424	DEC
Liangshan Prefecture 凉山州; Liángshān Zhōu (5134 / LSY)	Huili County	会理县	Huìlǐ Xiàn	513425	HLI
Liangshan Prefecture 凉山州; Liángshān Zhōu (5134 / LSY)	Huidong County	会东县	Huìdōng Xiàn	513426	HDG
Liangshan Prefecture 凉山州; Liángshān Zhōu (5134 / LSY)	Ningnan County	宁南县	Níngnán Xiàn	513427	NIN
Liangshan Prefecture 凉山州; Liángshān Zhōu (5134 / LSY)	Puge County	普格县	Pǔgé Xiàn	513428	PGE
Liangshan Prefecture 凉山州; Liángshān Zhōu (5134 / LSY)	Butuo County	布拖县	Bùtuō Xiàn	513429	BTO
Liangshan Prefecture 凉山州; Liángshān Zhōu (5134 / LSY)	Jinyang County	金阳县	Jīnyáng Xiàn	513430	JYW
Liangshan Prefecture 凉山州; Liángshān Zhōu (5134 / LSY)	Zhaojue County	昭觉县	Zhāojué Xiàn	513431	ZJE
Liangshan Prefecture 凉山州; Liángshān Zhōu (5134 / LSY)	Xide County	喜德县	Xǐdé Xiàn	513432	XDE
Liangshan Prefecture 凉山州; Liángshān Zhōu (5134 / LSY)	Mianning County	冕宁县	Miǎnníng Xiàn	513433	MNG
Liangshan Prefecture 凉山州; Liángshān Zhōu (5134 / LSY)	Yuexi County	越西县	Yuèxī Xiàn	513434	YXC
Liangshan Prefecture 凉山州; Liángshān Zhōu (5134 / LSY)	Ganluo County	甘洛县	Gānluò Xiàn	513435	GLO
Liangshan Prefecture 凉山州; Liángshān Zhōu (5134 / LSY)	Meigu County	美姑县	Měigū Xiàn	513436	MEG
Liangshan Prefecture 凉山州; Liángshān Zhōu (5134 / LSY)	Leibo County	雷波县	Léibō Xiàn	513437	LBX

== Recent changes in administrative divisions ==
Date	Before	After	Note	Reference
1981-07-01	Jiangjin Prefecture	Yongchuan Prefecture	renamed	
1983-01-18	all Province-controlled city (P-City) → Prefecture-level city (CL-City)			Civil Affairs Announcement
1983-01-18	all Prefecture-controlled city (PC-City) → County-level city (CL-City)			Civil Affairs Announcement
1983-01-31	Jiao District, Zigong	Yantan District	renamed	
1983-03-03	Wenjiang Prefecture	Chengdu (PL-City)	merged into	
1983-03-03	Yongchuan Prefecture	Chongqing (PL-City)	merged into	
1983-03-03	parts of Yibin Prefecture	Zigong (PL-City)	transferred	
1983-03-03	↳ Fushun County	↳ Fushun County	transferred	
1983-03-03	parts of Yibin Prefecture	Luzhou (PL-City) city district	established	
1983-03-03	↳ Luzhou (PL-City)	Luzhou (PL-City) city district	disestablished	
1983-03-03	↳ Lu County	↳ Lu County	transferred	
1983-03-03	↳ Naxi County	↳ Naxi County	transferred	
1983-03-03	↳ Hejiang County	↳ Hejiang County	transferred	
1983-03-03	↳ Gulin County	↳ Gulin County	transferred	
1983-03-03	↳ Xuyong County	↳ Xuyong County	transferred	
1983-04-04	Xiushan County	Xiushan County (Aut.)	reorganized	
1983-04-04	Youyang County	Youyang County (Aut.)	reorganized	
1983-08-18	parts of Mianyang Prefecture	Deyang (PL-City) city district	established	
1983-08-18	↳ Deyang County	Deyang (PL-City) city district	disestablished	
1983-08-18	↳ Deyang County	↳ Deyang County	transferred	
1983-08-18	↳ Zhongjiang County	↳ Zhongjiang County	transferred	
1983-08-18	↳ Mianzhu County	↳ Mianzhu County	transferred	
1983-08-18	parts of Chengdu (PL-City)	Deyang (PL-City)	transferred	
1983-08-18	↳ Guanghan County	↳ Guanghan County	transferred	
1983-08-18	↳ Shifang County	↳ Shifang County	transferred	
1983-09-09	Fuling County	Fuling (CL-City)	reorganized	
1983-09-09	Ya'an County	Ya'an (CL-City)	reorganized	
1983-09-09	parts of Luzhou (PL-City)	Yibin Prefecture	transferred	
1983-09-09	↳ Gulin County	↳ Gulin County	transferred	
1983-09-09	↳ Xuyong County	↳ Xuyong County	transferred	
1983-11-14	Shizhu County	Shizhu County (Aut.)	reorganized	
1983-11-14	Qianjiang County	Qianjiang County (Aut.)	reorganized	
1983-11-14	Pengshui County	Pengshui County (Aut.)	reorganized	
1984-04-09	Ebian County	Ebian County (Aut.)	reorganized	
1984-04-09	Mabian County	Mabian County (Aut.)	reorganized	
1984-09-12	Deyang (PL-City) city district	Shizhong District, Deyang	established	
1985-02-04	Huayun Nonggong District	Huaying (CL-City)	reorganized	
1985-02-08	Mianyang Prefecture	Mianyang (PL-City)	reorganized	
1985-02-08	Mianyang (CL-City)	Shizhong District, Mianyang	reorganized	
1985-02-08	parts of Mianyang Prefecture	Guangyuan (PL-City)	reorganized	
1985-02-08	↳ Guangyuan County	↳ Shizhong District, Guangyuan	reorganized	
1985-02-08	↳ Wangcang County	↳ Wangcang County	transferred	
1985-02-08	↳ Qingchuan County	↳ Qingchuan County	transferred	
1985-02-08	↳ Jianchi County	↳ Jianchi County	transferred	
1985-02-08	parts of Mianyang Prefecture	Suining (PL-City)	reorganized	
1985-02-08	Suining County	Shizhong District, Suining	reorganized	
1985-02-08	↳ Pengxi County	↳ Pengxi County	transferred	
1985-02-08	↳ Shehong County	↳ Shehong County	transferred	
1985-02-08	Neijiang Prefecture	Neijiang (PL-City)	reorganized	
1985-02-08	Neijiang (CL-City)	Shizhong District, Neijiang	reorganized	
1985-02-08	Leshan Prefecture	Leshan (PL-City)	reorganized	
1985-02-08	Leshan (CL-City)	Shizhong District, Leshan	disestablished & established	
1985-02-08	Leshan (CL-City)	Shawan District	disestablished & established	
1985-02-08	Leshan (CL-City)	Wutongqiao District	disestablished & established	
1985-02-08	Jinkouhe Nonggong District	Jinkouhe District	reorganized	
1985-06-04	parts of Yibin Prefecture	Luzhou (PL-City)	transferred	
1985-06-04	↳ Gulin County	↳ Gulin County	transferred	
1985-06-04	↳ Xuyong County	↳ Xuyong County	transferred	
1985-09-09	parts of Nanchong Prefecture	Guangyuan (PL-City)	transferred	
1985-09-09	↳ Cangxi County	↳ Cangxi County	transferred	
1986-06-06	Xichang County	Xichang (CL-City)	merged into	
1987-01-23	Dukou (PL-City)	Panzhihua (PL-City)	renamed	
1987-07-24	Aba Prefecture (Aut.)	Aba Prefecture (Aut.)	added Qiang Aut.	
1987-07-24	Mao County (Aut.)	Mao County	reorganized	
1988-02-24	Jiangyou County	Jiangyou (CL-City)	reorganized	
1988-02-24	Guanghan County	Guanghan (CL-City)	reorganized	
1988-03-03	Guan County	Dujiangyan (CL-City)	reorganized	
1988-05-18	parts of Fuling Prefecture	Qianjiang Prefecture	established	
1988-05-18	↳ Xiushan County (Aut.)	↳ Xiushan County (Aut.)	transferred	
1988-05-18	↳ Youyang County (Aut.)	↳ Youyang County (Aut.)	transferred	
1988-05-18	↳ Pengshui County (Aut.)	↳ Pengshui County (Aut.)	transferred	
1988-05-18	↳ Shizhu County (Aut.)	↳ Shizhu County (Aut.)	transferred	
1988-05-18	↳ Qianjiang County (Aut.)	↳ Qianjiang County (Aut.)	transferred	
1988-09-14	Mei County	Meishan (CL-City)	reorganized	
1989-07-07	Neijiang County	Dongxing District	reorganized	
1989-08-15	parts of Shizhong District, Guang'an	Yuanba District	established	
1989-08-15	parts of Shizhong District, Guang'an	Chaotian District	established	
1990-09-04	Dongcheng District, Chengdu	Jinjiang District	disestablished & established	
1990-09-04	Dongcheng District, Chengdu	Wuhou District	disestablished & established	
1990-09-04	Xicheng District, Chengdu	Wuhou District	disestablished & established	
1990-09-04	Xicheng District, Chengdu	Qingyang District	disestablished & established	
1990-09-04	parts of Jinniu District	Chenghua District	established	
1992-03-09	Yongchuan County	Yongchuan (CL-City)	reorganized	Civil Affairs [1992]25
1992-12-11	Wanxian Prefecture	Wanxian (PL-City)	reorganized	State Council [1992]194
1992-12-11	Wanxian (CL-City)	Longbao District	disestablished & established	State Council [1992]194
1992-12-11	Wanxian (CL-City)	Tiancheng District	disestablished & established	State Council [1992]194
1992-12-11	Wanxian (CL-City)	Wuqiao District	disestablished & established	State Council [1992]194
1992-12-11	Wan County	Longbao District	disestablished & established	State Council [1992]194
1992-12-11	Wan County	Tiancheng District	disestablished & established	State Council [1992]194
1992-12-11	Wan County	Wuqiao District	disestablished & established	State Council [1992]194
1992-08-04	Jiangjin County	Jiangjin (CL-City)	reorganized	Civil Affairs [1992]88
1992-08-04	Hechuan County	Hechuan (CL-City)	reorganized	Civil Affairs [1992]89
1992-10-30	Shizhong District, Mianyang	Fucheng District	disestablished & established	Civil Affairs [1992]127
1992-10-30	Shizhong District, Mianyang	Youxian District	disestablished & established	Civil Affairs [1992]127
1993-01-16	Ziyang County	Ziyang (CL-City)	reorganized	Civil Affairs [1993]5
1993-02-16	Nantong Kuang District	Wansheng District	renamed	Civil Affairs [1993]42
1993-07-02	parts of Nanchong Prefecture	Nanchong (PL-City)	reorganized	State Council [1993]96
1993-07-02	Nanchong (CL-City)	Shunqing District	disestablished & established	State Council [1993]96
1993-07-02	Nanchong (CL-City)	Gaoping District	disestablished & established	State Council [1993]96
1993-07-02	Nanchong (CL-City)	Jialing District	disestablished & established	State Council [1993]96
1993-07-02	Nanchong County	Shunqing District	disestablished & established	State Council [1993]96
1993-07-02	Nanchong County	Gaoping District	disestablished & established	State Council [1993]96
1993-07-02	Nanchong County	Jialing District	disestablished & established	State Council [1993]96
1993-07-02	parts of Nanchong Prefecture	Guang'an Prefecture	established	State Council [1993]97
1993-07-02	↳ Guang'an County	↳ Guang'an County	transferred	State Council [1993]97
1993-07-02	↳ Yuechi County	↳ Yuechi County	transferred	State Council [1993]97
1993-07-02	↳ Wusheng County	↳ Wusheng County	transferred	State Council [1993]97
1993-07-02	↳ Huaying (CL-City)	↳ Huaying (CL-City)	transferred	State Council [1993]97
1993-07-02	parts of Daxian Prefecture	Guang'an Prefecture	established	State Council [1993]97
1993-07-02	↳ Linshui County	↳ Linshui County	transferred	State Council [1993]97
1993-07-02	Bazhong County	Bazhong (CL-City)	reorganized	
1993-07-05	parts of Daxian Prefecture	Bazhong Prefecture	established	State Council [1993]98
1993-07-05	↳ Tongjiang County	↳ Tongjiang County	transferred	State Council [1993]98
1993-07-05	↳ Nanjiang County	↳ Nanjiang County	transferred	State Council [1993]98
1993-07-05	↳ Pingchang County	↳ Pingchang County	transferred	State Council [1993]98
1993-07-05	↳ Bazhong (CL-City)	↳ Bazhong (CL-City)	transferred	State Council [1993]98
1993-07-05	Daxian Prefecture	Dachuan Prefecture	renamed	State Council [1993]98
1993-07-05	Daxian (CL-City)	Dachuan (CL-City)	renamed	State Council [1993]98
1993-11-18	Pengzhou County	Pengzhou (CL-City)	reorganized	Civil Affairs [1993]232
1994-04-05	Jianyang County	Jianyang (CL-City)	reorganized	Civil Affairs [1994]53
1994-04-05	Nanchuan County	Nanchuan (CL-City)	reorganized	Civil Affairs [1994]54
1994-06-06	Qionglai County	Qionglai (CL-City)	reorganized	Civil Affairs [1994]88
1994-06-10	Chongqing County	Chongzhou (CL-City)	reorganized	Civil Affairs [1994]91
1994-12-17	Shizhong District, Chongqing	Yuzhong District	disestablished & established	State Council [1994]138
1994-12-17	Shizhong District, Chongqing	Dadukou District	merged into	State Council [1994]138
1994-12-17	Shizhong District, Chongqing	Jiangbei District	merged into	State Council [1994]138
1994-12-17	Shizhong District, Chongqing	Shapingba District	merged into	State Council [1994]138
1994-12-17	Shizhong District, Chongqing	Jiulongpo District	merged into	State Council [1994]138
1994-12-17	Shizhong District, Chongqing	Nan'an District	merged into	State Council [1994]138
1994-12-17	Jiangbei County	Yubei District	reorganized	State Council [1994]138
1994-12-17	Ba County	Banan District	reorganized	State Council [1994]138
1995-10-27	Shifang County	Shifang (CL-City)	reorganized	Civil Affairs [1995]76
1995-11-05	Fuling Prefecture	Fuling (PL-City)	reorganized	State Council [1195]106
1995-11-05	Fuling (CL-City)	Zhicheng District	disestablished & established	State Council [1195]106
1995-11-05	Fuling (CL-City)	Lidu District	disestablished & established	State Council [1195]106
1995-12-24	Shizhong District, Luzhou	Jiangyang District	renamed	State Council [1995]132
1995-12-24	Naxi County	Naxi District	reorganized	State Council [1995]132
1995-12-24	Naxi County	Longmatan District	established	State Council [1995]132
1996-08-03	Shizhong District, Deyang	Jingyang District	disestablished & established	State Council [1996]63
1996-08-03	Shizhong District, Deyang	Luojiang County	disestablished & established	State Council [1996]63
1996-09-05	Chongqing (PL-City)	★ Chongqing (PL-City)	subordinated to Chongqing (PL-City)	Civil Affairs Announcement
1996-09-05	Wanxian (PL-City)	☆ Wanxian (PL-City)	subordinated to Chongqing (PL-City)	Civil Affairs Announcement
1996-09-05	Fuling (PL-City)	☆ Fuling (PL-City)	subordinated to Chongqing (PL-City)	Civil Affairs Announcement
1996-09-05	Qianjiang Prefecture	☆ Qianjiang Prefecture	subordinated to Chongqing (PL-City)	Civil Affairs Announcement
1996-10-05	Yibin Prefecture	Yibin (PL-City)	reorganized	State Council [1996]80
1996-10-05	Yibin (CL-City)	Cuiping District	reorganized	State Council [1996]80
1996-10-08	Mianzhu County	Mianzhu (CL-City)	reorganized	Civil Affairs [1996]72
1997-04-18	parts of Sichuan Province	Chongqing (Municipality)	provincial established	Civil Affairs Announcement
1997-04-18	★ Chongqing (PL-City)	provincial-controlled	reorganized & transferred	Civil Affairs Announcement
1997-04-18	↳ Yuzhong District	↳ Yuzhong District	transferred	Civil Affairs Announcement
1997-04-18	↳ Dadukou District	↳ Dadukou District	transferred	Civil Affairs Announcement
1997-04-18	↳ Jiangbei District	↳ Jiangbei District	transferred	Civil Affairs Announcement
1997-04-18	↳ Shapingba District	↳ Shapingba District	transferred	Civil Affairs Announcement
1997-04-18	↳ Jiulongpo District	↳ Jiulongpo District	transferred	Civil Affairs Announcement
1997-04-18	↳ Nan'an District	↳ Nan'an District	transferred	Civil Affairs Announcement
1997-04-18	↳ Beibei District	↳ Beibei District	transferred	Civil Affairs Announcement
1997-04-18	↳ Wansheng District	↳ Wansheng District	transferred	Civil Affairs Announcement
1997-04-18	↳ Shuangqiao District	↳ Shuangqiao District	transferred	Civil Affairs Announcement
1997-04-18	↳ Yubei District	↳ Yubei District	transferred	Civil Affairs Announcement
1997-04-18	↳ Banan District	↳ Banan District	transferred	Civil Affairs Announcement
1997-04-18	↳ Changshou County	↳ Changshou County	transferred	Civil Affairs Announcement
1997-04-18	↳ Qijiang County	↳ Qijiang County	transferred	Civil Affairs Announcement
1997-04-18	↳ Tongnan County	↳ Tongnan County	transferred	Civil Affairs Announcement
1997-04-18	↳ Tongliang County	↳ Tongliang County	transferred	Civil Affairs Announcement
1997-04-18	↳ Dazu County	↳ Dazu County	transferred	Civil Affairs Announcement
1997-04-18	↳ Rongchang County	↳ Rongchang County	transferred	Civil Affairs Announcement
1997-04-18	↳ Bishan County	↳ Bishan County	transferred	Civil Affairs Announcement
1997-04-18	↳ Yongchuan (CL-City)	↳ Yongchuan (CL-City)	transferred	Civil Affairs Announcement
1997-04-18	↳ Jiangjin (CL-City)	↳ Jiangjin (CL-City)	transferred	Civil Affairs Announcement
1997-04-18	↳ Hechuan (CL-City)	↳ Hechuan (CL-City)	transferred	Civil Affairs Announcement
1997-04-18	parts of Sichuan Province	Chongqing (Municipality)	provincial transferred	Civil Affairs Announcement
1997-04-18	★ Chongqing (PL-City)	provincial-controlled	disestablished & merged into	Civil Affairs Announcement
1997-04-18	☆ Fuling (PL-City)	provincial-controlled	disestablished & merged into	Civil Affairs Announcement
1997-04-18	↳ Zhicheng District	↳ Fuling District	disestablished & established	Civil Affairs Announcement
1997-04-18	↳ Lidu District	↳ Fuling District	disestablished & established	Civil Affairs Announcement
1997-04-18	↳ Dianjiang County	↳ Dianjiang County	transferred	Civil Affairs Announcement
1997-04-18	↳ Fengdu County	↳ Fengdu County	transferred	Civil Affairs Announcement
1997-04-18	↳ Wulong County	↳ Wulong County	transferred	Civil Affairs Announcement
1997-04-18	↳ Nanchuan (CL-City)	↳ Nanchuan (CL-City)	transferred	Civil Affairs Announcement
1997-04-18	parts of Sichuan Province	Chongqing (Municipality)	provincial transferred	Civil Affairs Announcement
1997-04-18	★ Chongqing (PL-City)	provincial-controlled	disestablished & merged into	Civil Affairs Announcement
1997-04-18	☆ parts of Wanxian (PL-City)	provincial-controlled	transferred & merged into	Civil Affairs Announcement
1997-04-18	↳ Longbao District	↳ Wanxian District	disestablished & established	Civil Affairs Announcement
1997-04-18	↳ Taincheng District	↳ Wanxian District	disestablished & established	Civil Affairs Announcement
1997-04-18	↳ Wuqiao District	↳ Wanxian District	disestablished & established	Civil Affairs Announcement
1997-04-18	parts of Sichuan Province	Chongqing (Municipality)	provincial transferred	Civil Affairs Announcement
1997-04-18	★ Chongqing (PL-City)	provincial-controlled	disestablished & merged into	Civil Affairs Announcement
1997-04-18	☆ Wanxian (PL-City)	Wanxian Migration; Development Area	reorganized & transferred	Civil Affairs Announcement
1997-04-18	↳ Zhong County	↳ Zhong County	transferred	Civil Affairs Announcement
1997-04-18	↳ Kai County	↳ Kai County	transferred	Civil Affairs Announcement
1997-04-18	↳ Yunyang County	↳ Yunyang County	transferred	Civil Affairs Announcement
1997-04-18	↳ Fengjie County	↳ Fengjie County	transferred	Civil Affairs Announcement
1997-04-18	↳ Wushan County	↳ Wushan County	transferred	Civil Affairs Announcement
1997-04-18	↳ Wuxi County	↳ Wuxi County	transferred	Civil Affairs Announcement
1997-04-18	parts of Sichuan Province	Chongqing (Municipality)	provincial transferred	Civil Affairs Announcement
1997-04-18	★ Chongqing (PL-City)	provincial-controlled	disestablished & merged into	Civil Affairs Announcement
1997-04-18	☆ Qianjiang Prefecture	Qianjiang Migration; Development Area	reorganized & transferred	Civil Affairs Announcement
1997-04-18	↳ Xiushan County (Aut.)	↳ Xiushan County (Aut.)	transferred	Civil Affairs Announcement
1997-04-18	↳ Youyang County (Aut.)	↳ Youyang County (Aut.)	transferred	Civil Affairs Announcement
1997-04-18	↳ Pengshui County (Aut.)	↳ Pengshui County (Aut.)	transferred	Civil Affairs Announcement
1997-04-18	↳ Shizhu County (Aut.)	↳ Shizhu County (Aut.)	transferred	Civil Affairs Announcement
1997-04-18	↳ Qianjiang County (Aut.)	↳ Qianjiang County (Aut.)	transferred	Civil Affairs Announcement
1997-05-30	parts of Leshan (PL-City)	Meishan Prefecture	established	State Council [1997]41
1997-05-30	↳ Meishan County	↳ Meishan County	transferred	State Council [1997]41
1997-05-30	↳ Renshou County	↳ Renshou County	transferred	State Council [1997]41
1997-05-30	↳ Pengshan County	↳ Pengshan County	transferred	State Council [1997]41
1997-05-30	↳ Hongya County	↳ Hongya County	transferred	State Council [1997]41
1997-05-30	↳ Danleng County	↳ Danleng County	transferred	State Council [1997]41
1997-05-30	↳ Qingshen County	↳ Qingshen County	transferred	State Council [1997]41
1997-10-31	parts of Pengxi County	Daying County	established	Civil Affairs [1997]23
1997-12-15	Nanping County	Jiuzhaigou County	renamed	Civil Affairs [1997]27
1998-02-26	parts of Neijiang (PL-City)	Ziyang Prefecture	established	State Council [1998]15
1998-02-26	↳ Lezhi County	↳ Lezhi County	transferred	State Council [1998]15
1998-02-26	↳ Anyue County	↳ Anyue County	transferred	State Council [1998]15
1998-02-26	↳ Ziyang (CL-City)	↳ Ziyang (CL-City)	transferred	State Council [1998]15
1998-02-26	↳ Jianyang (CL-City)	↳ Jianyang (CL-City)	transferred	State Council [1998]15
1998-07-31	Guang'an Prefecture	Guang'an (PL-City)	reorganized	State Council [1998]60
1998-07-31	Guang'an County	Guang'an District	reorganized	State Council [1998]60
1999-06-20	Dachuan Prefecture	Dazhou (PL-City)	reorganized	State Council [1999]51
1999-06-20	Dachuan (CL-City)	Tongchuan District	reorganized	State Council [1999]51
2000-06-10	Meishan Prefecture	Meishan (PL-City)	reorganized	
2000-06-10	Meishan (CL-City)	Dongpo District	reorganized	
2000-06-14	Ya'an Prefecture	Ya'an (PL-City)	reorganized	
2000-06-14	Ya'an (CL-City)	Yucheng District	reorganized	
2000-06-14	Bazhong Prefecture	Bazhong (PL-City)	reorganized	
2000-06-14	Bazhong (CL-City)	Bazhou District	reorganized	
2000-06-21	Ziyang Prefecture	Ziyang (PL-City)	reorganized	
2000-06-21	Ziyang (CL-City)	Yanjiang District	reorganized	
2001-11-25	Xindu County	Xindu District	reorganized	State Council [2001]149
2002-04-10	Wenjiang County	Wenjiang District	reorganized	State Council [2002]28
2003-07-06	Beichuan County	Beichuan County (Aut.)	reorganized	State Council [2003]75
2003-12-18	Shizhong District, Suining	Chuanshan District	disestablished & established	State Council [2003]131
2003-12-18	Shizhong District, Suining	Anju District	disestablished & established	State Council [2003]131
2007-01-11	Shizhong District, Guangyuan	Lizhou District	renamed	Civil Affairs [2007]12
2011-02-17	Nanxi County	Nanxi District	reorganized	State Council [2011]18
2012-09-30	Mingshan County	Mingshan District	reorganized	State Council [2012]151
2013-01-18	parts of Bazhou District	Enyang District	established	State Council [2013]16
2013-02-08	parts of Guang'an District	Qianfeng District	established	State Council [2013]22
2013-03-20	Yuanba District	Zhaohua District	renamed	Civil Affairs [2013]84
2013-0-18	Da County	Dachuan District	reorganized	State Council [2013]73
2014-10-20	Pengshan County	Pengshan District	reorganized	State Council [2014]140
2015-02-17	Kangding County	Kangding (CL-City)	reorganized	Civil Affairs [2015]70
2015-11-02	Ma'erkang County	Ma'erkang (CL-City)	reorganized	Civil Affairs [2015]321
2015-12-03	Shuangliu County	Shuangliu District	reorganized	State Council [2015]207
2016-03-20	An County	Anzhou District	reorganized	State Council [2016]57
2016-05-03	parts of Ziyang (PL-City)	Chengdu (PL-City)	transferred	State Council [2016]78
2016-05-03	↳ Jianyang (CL-City)	↳ Jianyang (CL-City)	transferred	State Council [2016]78
2016-11-24	Pi County	Pidu District	reorganized	State Council [2016]186
2017-04-09	Longchang County	Longchang (CL-City)	reorganized	Civil Affairs [2017]72
2017-07-18	Luojiang County	Luojiang District	reorganized	State Council [2017]106
2018-06-19	Yibin County	Xuzhou District	reorganized	State Council [2018]89
2019-07-20	Shehong County	Shehong (CL-City)	reorganized	Civil Affairs [2019]72
2020-06-??	Xinjin County	Xinjin District	reorganized	

== Population composition ==
=== Prefectures ===
Prefecture	2010	2000
Garzê	1,091,872	897,239
Ngawa	898,713	847,468
Mianyang	4,613,862	5,170,141
Guangyuan	2,484,123	3,062,541
Nanchong	6,278,622	6,683,406
Bazhong	3,283,771	3,130,261
Dazhou	5,468,092	5,793,144
Ya'an	1,507,264	1,522,845
Chengdu	14,047,625	11,244,272
Deyang	3,615,759	3,788,056
Suining	3,252,551	3,519,520
Guang'an	3,205,476	4,175,650
Meishan	2,950,548	3,205,171
Ziyang	3,665064	4,563424
Leshan	3,235,756	3,324,139
Neijiang	3,702,847	4,160,305
Zigong	2,678,898	3,033,763
Yibin	4,472,001	4,908,839
Luzhou	4,218,426	4,102,165
Liangshan	4,532,809	4,081,697
Panzhihua	1,214,121	1,091,657

=== Counties ===
Name	Prefecture	2010
Jinjiang	Chengdu	690,422
Qingyang	Chengdu	828,140
Jinniu	Chengdu	1,754,201
Wuhou	Chengdu	1,083,806
Chenghua	Chengdu	938,785
Longquanyi	Chengdu	767,203
Qingbaijiang	Chengdu	381,792
Xindu	Chengdu	775,703
Wenjiang	Chengdu	457,070
Jintang	Chengdu	717,225
Shuangliu	Chengdu	1,158,516
Pidu	Chengdu	756,047
Dayi	Chengdu	502,198
Pujiang	Chengdu	239,562
Xinjin	Chengdu	302,199
Dujiangyan	Chengdu	657,996
Pengzhou	Chengdu	762,887
Qionglai	Chengdu	612,753
Chongzhou	Chengdu	661,120
Jianyang	Chengdu	1,071,215
Ziliujing	Zigong	346,401
Gongjing	Zigong	260,607
Da'an	Zigong	382,245
Yantan	Zigong	272,809
Rong(xian)	Zigong	590,640
Fushun	Zigong	826,196
Dong	Panzhihua	364,326
Xi	Panzhihua	162,557
Renhe	Panzhihua	260,294
Miyi	Panzhihua	219,227
Yanbian	Panzhihua	207,717
Jiangyang	Luzhou	575,233
Naxi	Luzhou	451,401
Longmatan	Luzhou	344,601
Lu(xian)	Luzhou	840,336
Hejiang	Luzhou	709,473
Xuyong	Luzhou	584,299
Gulin	Luzhou	713,083
Jingyang	Deyang	735,070
Zhongjiang	Deyang	1,186,762
Luojiang	Deyang	212,186
Guanghan	Deyang	591,115
Shifang	Deyang	412,758
Mianzhu	Deyang	477,868
Fucheng	Mianyang	866,727
Youxian	Mianyang	488,604
Santai	Mianyang	1,042,064
Yanting	Mianyang	417,221
Anzhou	Mianyang	366,802
Zitong	Mianyang	302,246
Pingwu	Mianyang	170,959
Beichuan	Mianyang	197,108
Jiangyou	Mianyang	762,142
Lizhou	Guangyuan	516,424
Yuanba → Zhaohua	Guangyuan	168,489
Chaotian	Guangyuan	174,333
Wangcang	Guangyuan	385,787
Qingchuan	Guangyuan	222,253
Jiange	Guangyuan	457,656
Cangxi	Guangyuan	559,181
Chuanshan	Suining	656,760
Anju	Suining	639,125
Pengxi	Suining	553,239
Shehong	Suining	924,531
Daying	Suining	478,896
Shizhong	Neijiang	501,285
Dongxing	Neijiang	749,810
Weiyuan	Neijiang	626,482
Zizhong	Neijiang	1,192,060
Longchang	Neijiang	633,210
Shizhong	Leshan	662,812
Shawan	Leshan	187,180
Wutongqiao	Leshan	312,086
Jinkouhe	Leshan	49,157
Qianwei	Leshan	434,409
Jingyan	Leshan	282,222
Jiajiang	Leshan	338,345
Muchuan	Leshan	216,737
Ebian	Leshan	139,210
Mabian	Leshan	176,530
Emeishan	Leshan	437,068
Shunqing	Nanchong	635,999
Gaoping	Nanchong	585,769
Jialing	Nanchong	691,489
Nanbu	Nanchong	1,275,748
Yingshan	Nanchong	926,940
Peng'an	Nanchong	702,336
Yilong	Nanchong	1,088,266
Xichong	Nanchong	643,818
Langzhong	Nanchong	870,708
Dongpo	Meishan	840,909
Renshou	Meishan	1,571,112
Pengshan	Meishan	329,777
Hongya	Meishan	343,321
Danleng	Meishan	163,032
Qingshen	Meishan	197,029
Cuiping	Yibin	836,383
Yibin→Xuzhou	Yibin	813,057
Nanxi	Yibin	335,805
Jiang'an	Yibin	399,829
Changning	Yibin	340,016
Gao(xian)	Yibin	411,118
Gong(xian)	Yibin	379,798
Junlian	Yibin	329,056
Xingwen	Yibin	377,162
Pingshan	Yibin	249,777
Guang'an	Guang'an	858,159
Qianfeng	Guang'an	not established
Yuechi	Guang'an	778,639
Wusheng	Guang'an	585,624
Linshui	Guang'an	704,695
Huaying	Guang'an	278,359
Tongchuan	Dazhou	478,276
Da(xian) → Dachuan	Dazhou	1,111,159
Xuanhan	Dazhou	1,006,826
Kaijiang	Dazhou	430,878
Dazhu	Dazhou	876,884
Qu(xian)	Dazhou	1,156,476
Wanyuan	Dazhou	407,593
Yucheng	Ya'an	355,572
Mingshan	Ya'an	256,484
Yingjing	Ya'an	147,955
Hanyuan	Ya'an	324,408
Shimian	Ya'an	123,600
Tianquan	Ya'an	134,156
Lushan	Ya'an	109,029
Baoxing	Ya'an	56,060
Bazhou	Bazhong	1,126,790
Enyang	Bazhong	not established
Tongjiang	Bazhong	687,369
Nanjiang	Bazhong	606,992
Pingchang	Bazhong	862,620
Yanjiang	Ziyang	905,729
Anyue	Ziyang	1,141,347
Lezhi	Ziyang	546,773
Wenchuan	Aba	100,776
Li(xian)	Aba	46,556
Mao(xian)	Aba	104,829
Songpan	Aba	72,309
Jiuzhaigou	Aba	81,394
Jinchuan	Aba	65,976
Xiaojin	Aba	77,731
Heishui	Aba	60,704
Ma'erkang	Aba	58,437
Rangtang	Aba	39,173
Aba	Aba	72,391
Ruo'ergai	Aba	74,619
Hongyuan	Aba	43,818
Kangding	Ganzi	130,142
Luding	Ganzi	83,386
Danba	Ganzi	59,696
Jiulong	Ganzi	62,133
Yajiang	Ganzi	50,225
Daofu	Ganzi	55,396
Luhuo	Ganzi	46,558
Ganzi	Ganzi	68,523
Xinlong	Ganzi	50,393
Dege	Ganzi	81,503
Baiyu	Ganzi	56,290
Shiqu	Ganzi	80,834
Seda	Ganzi	58,606
Litang	Ganzi	69,046
Batang	Ganzi	48,649
Xiangcheng	Ganzi	33,170
Daocheng	Ganzi	31,113
Derong	Ganzi	26,209
Xichang	Liangshan	712,434
Yanyuan	Liangshan	350,176
Dechang	Liangshan	214,405
Huili	Liangshan	430,066
Huidong	Liangshan	362,944
Ningnan	Liangshan	170,673
Puge	Liangshan	155,740
Butuo	Liangshan	160,151
Jinyang	Liangshan	165,121
Zhaojue	Liangshan	251,836
Xide	Liangshan	165,906
Mianning	Liangshan	351,245
Yuexi	Liangshan	269,896
Ganluo	Liangshan	195,100
Meigu	Liangshan	221,505
Leibo	Liangshan	223,885
Muli	Liangshan	131,726
