= AJQ (disambiguation) =

AJQ may refer to:

- The Australian Jazz Quartet, also called the Australian Jazz Quintet; a 1950s jazz band from Australia
- Volkswagen AJQ, a 1.8 R4 20vT petrol engine
- Anju District (Chinese: 安居区; pinyin: Ānjū Qū), Suining, Sichuan, China; having the division code AJQ; see List of administrative divisions of Sichuan
