= Pengzhou (disambiguation) =

Pengzhou (彭州) is a city in Sichuan, China.

Pengzhou or Peng Prefecture may refer to:

- Pengzhou (彭州), a former prefecture in modern Qingyang, Gansu, China
- Pengzhou (彭州), a former prefecture in roughly modern Barkam County, Sichuan, China
- Pengzhou (蓬州), a former prefecture in roughly modern Peng'an County, Sichuan, China
- Pengzhou (蓬州), a former prefecture in roughly modern Hanyuan County, Sichuan, China
