= Nanxi, Yibin =

Nanxi 南溪区
- District
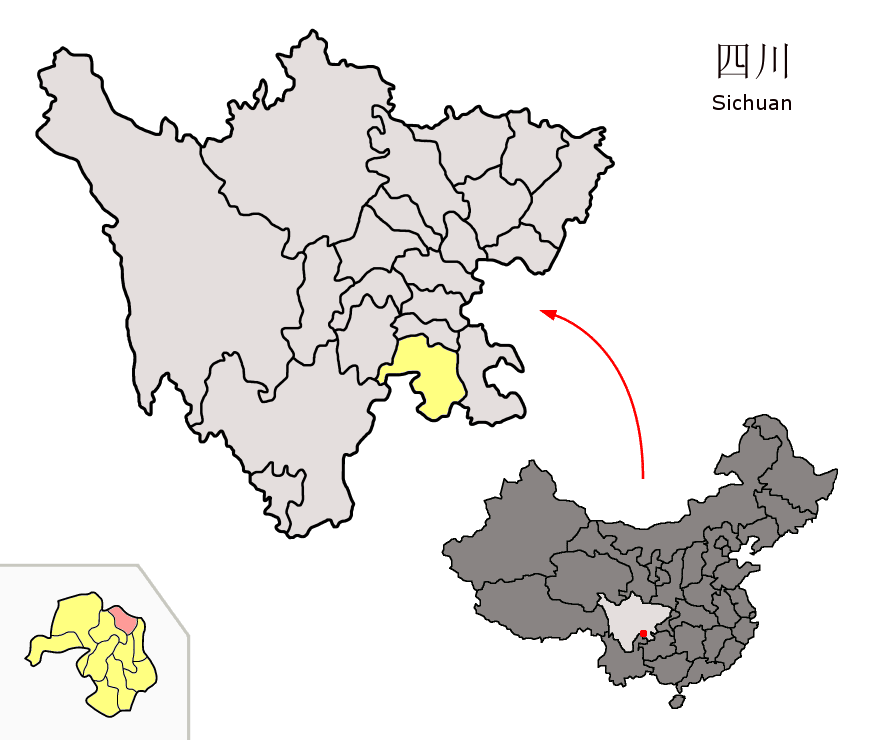
- Location of Nanxi District (red) within Yibin City (yellow) and Sichuan
- Coordinates: 28°50′46″N 104°58′12″E
- Country: China
- Province: Sichuan
- Prefecture-level city: Yibin

Area
  - Total: 704 km^{2} (272 sq mi)

Population (2020)
  - Total: 332,796
  - Density: 473/km^{2} (1,220/sq mi)
- Time zone: UTC+8 (China Standard)

Nanxi District (simplified Chinese: 南溪区; traditional Chinese: 南溪區; pinyin: Nánxī Qū) is a district of the city of Yibin, Sichuan province, People's Republic of China. Nanxi was known as Nanxi County (Chinese: 南溪县) until 28 July 2011, when it was upgraded to Nanxi District.

== Administrative divisions ==
Nanxi District comprises 3 subdistricts and 8 towns:

subdistricts

- Nanxi 南溪街道
- Luolong 罗龙街道
- Xianyuan 仙源街道

towns

- Liujia 刘家镇
- Jiangnan 江南镇
- Daguan 大观镇
- Wangjia 汪家镇
- Huangsha 黄沙镇
- Xianlin 仙临镇
- Changxing 长兴镇
- Peishi 裴石镇

== Climate ==
Climate data for Nanxi, elevation 293 m (961 ft), (1991–2020 normals, extremes 1981–present)
Month	Jan	Feb	Mar	Apr	May	Jun	Jul	Aug	Sep	Oct	Nov	Dec	Year
Record high °C (°F)	20.1 (68.2)	26.5 (79.7)	33.6 (92.5)	35.2 (95.4)	37.8 (100.0)	38.5 (101.3)	40.5 (104.9)	42.3 (108.1)	40.7 (105.3)	33.6 (92.5)	25.9 (78.6)	19.6 (67.3)	42.3 (108.1)
Mean daily maximum °C (°F)	10.8 (51.4)	14.0 (57.2)	19.1 (66.4)	24.6 (76.3)	27.7 (81.9)	29.4 (84.9)	32.4 (90.3)	32.5 (90.5)	27.6 (81.7)	21.9 (71.4)	17.6 (63.7)	11.9 (53.4)	22.5 (72.4)
Daily mean °C (°F)	7.9 (46.2)	10.4 (50.7)	14.5 (58.1)	19.4 (66.9)	22.8 (73.0)	24.9 (76.8)	27.4 (81.3)	27.3 (81.1)	23.4 (74.1)	18.6 (65.5)	14.3 (57.7)	9.3 (48.7)	18.4 (65.0)
Mean daily minimum °C (°F)	6.0 (42.8)	8.0 (46.4)	11.4 (52.5)	15.8 (60.4)	19.1 (66.4)	21.7 (71.1)	23.9 (75.0)	23.7 (74.7)	20.7 (69.3)	16.6 (61.9)	12.2 (54.0)	7.5 (45.5)	15.5 (60.0)
Record low °C (°F)	−1.0 (30.2)	0.1 (32.2)	1.0 (33.8)	7.7 (45.9)	10.2 (50.4)	15.7 (60.3)	17.2 (63.0)	18.4 (65.1)	14.6 (58.3)	6.2 (43.2)	2.4 (36.3)	−1.5 (29.3)	−1.5 (29.3)
Average precipitation mm (inches)	18.2 (0.72)	18.0 (0.71)	34.0 (1.34)	64.0 (2.52)	104.7 (4.12)	171.1 (6.74)	184.3 (7.26)	160.0 (6.30)	116.5 (4.59)	66.7 (2.63)	27.4 (1.08)	18.8 (0.74)	983.7 (38.75)
Average precipitation days (≥ 0.1 mm)	12.2	10.2	12.2	13.6	15.2	17.2	13.2	12.3	15.2	17.0	10.9	11.9	161.1
Average snowy days	0.2	0	0	0	0	0	0	0	0	0	0	0.1	0.3
Average relative humidity (%)	87	83	79	77	77	83	82	80	85	88	86	87	83
Mean monthly sunshine hours	21.0	39.3	74.5	105.5	106.6	90.1	147.2	156.1	81.3	42.0	40.0	21.5	925.1
Percentage possible sunshine	7	12	20	27	25	22	35	39	22	12	13	7	20
Source: China Meteorological Administrationall-time extreme temperatureall-time July high
