= Wutongqiao, Leshan =

Wutongqiao 五通桥区
- District
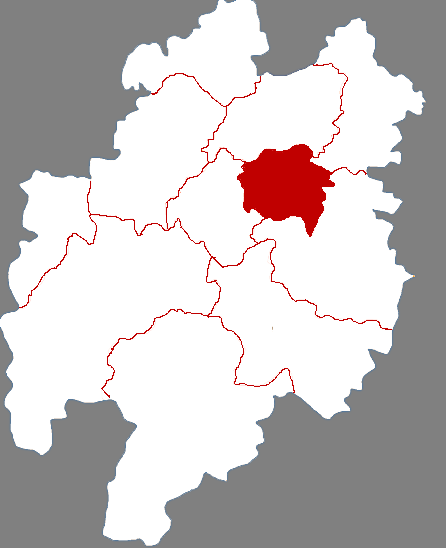
- Wutongqiao in Leshan

- Leshan in Sichuan
- Coordinates: 29°24′24″N 103°49′06″E
- Country: China
- Province: Sichuan
- Prefecture-level city: Leshan

Area
  - Total: 474 km^{2} (183 sq mi)

Population (2020)
  - Total: 237,933
  - Density: 502/km^{2} (1,300/sq mi)
- Time zone: UTC+8 (China Standard)

Wutongqiao, Leshan
- Traditional Chinese: 五通橋
- Simplified Chinese: 五通桥
- Postal: Wutungkiao
- Literal meaning: 5-Passage Bridge
Transcriptions
Standard Mandarin
- Hanyu Pinyin: Wǔtōngqiáo
- Wade–Giles: Wu-T'ung-Ch'iao

Wutongqiao District is an urban district of the prefecture-level city of Leshan, Sichuan province, China. As a separate city on the banks of the Min River, Wutongqiao was formerly romanized as Wutungkiao. (Note: The name was also sometimes romanized as Woo-tung-keaou.)

It has been known for producing salt since at least the 19th century.

== Administrative divisions ==
Wutongqiao District comprises 8 towns:

- Zhugen 竹根镇
- Niuhua 牛华镇
- Jinsu 金粟镇
- Jinshan 金山镇
- Xiba 西坝镇
- Guanying 冠英镇
- Caijin 蔡金镇
- Shilin 石麟镇

== Transport ==
- China National Highway 213
