= Gongjing, Zigong =

Coordinates: 29°20′04″N 104°41′34″E

Gongjing 贡井区
- District
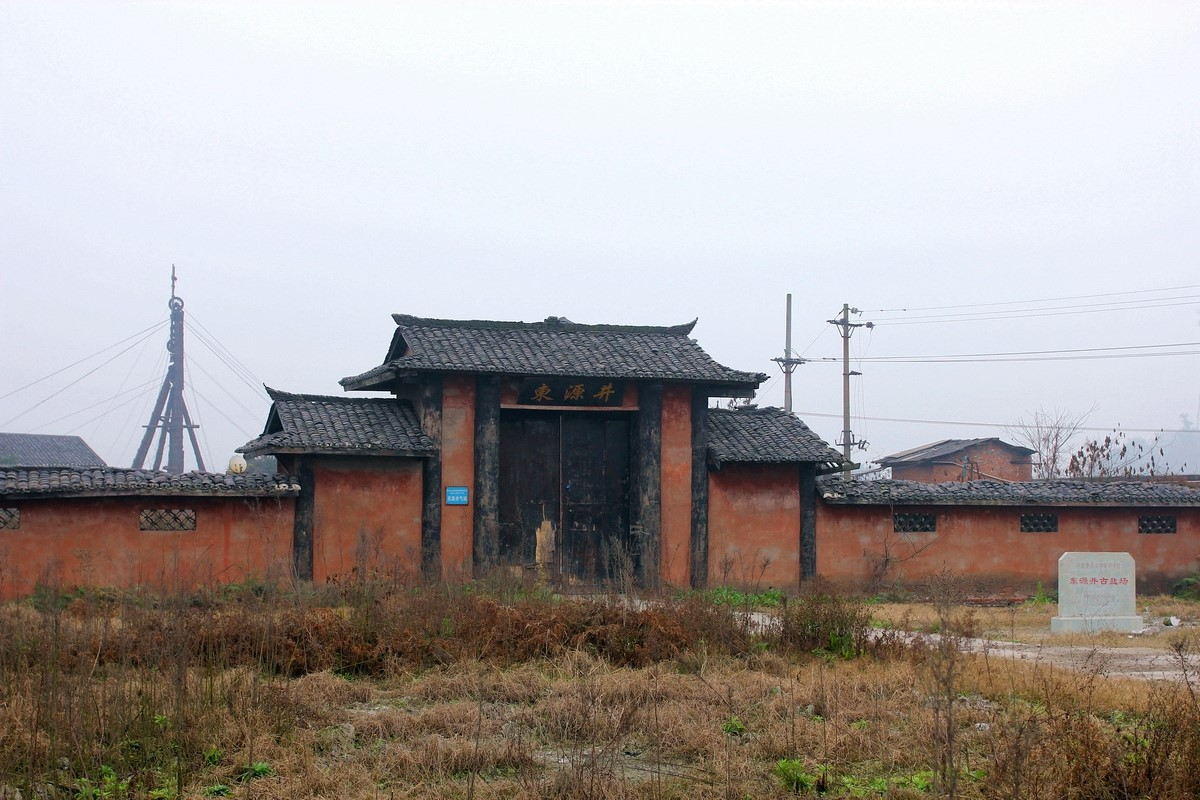

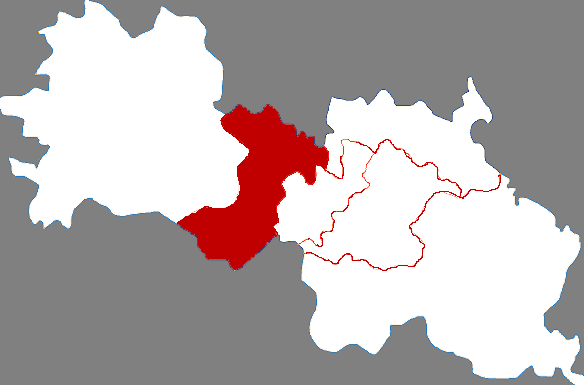
- Gongjing in Zigong

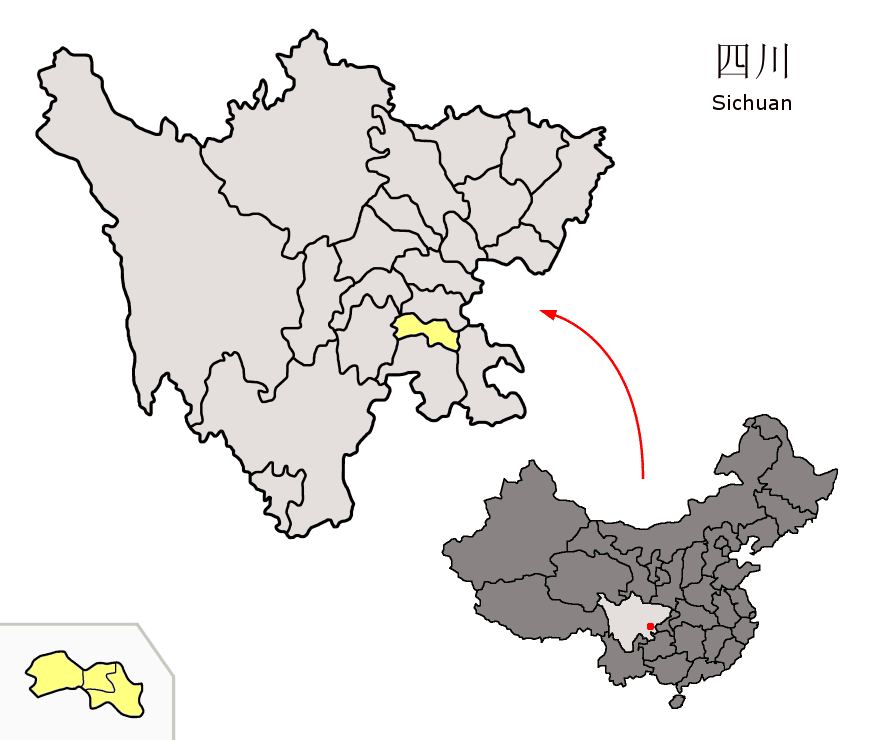
- Zigong in Sichuan
- Country: China
- Province: Sichuan
- Prefecture-level city: Zigong
- District seat: Wenxi Subdistrict

Area
  - Total: 417.63 km^{2} (161.25 sq mi)
- Elevation: 322 m (1,056 ft)

Population (2020 census)
  - Total: 226,704
  - Density: 542.83/km^{2} (1,405.9/sq mi)
- Time zone: UTC+8 (China Standard)
- Division code: GJQ

Gongjing
- Simplified Chinese: 贡井
- Traditional Chinese: 貢井
- Postal: Kungtsing
Transcriptions
Standard Mandarin
- Hanyu Pinyin: Gòngjǐng
- Wade–Giles: Kung^{4}-ching^{3}

Gongjing District is a district of the city of Zigong, Sichuan Province, China. According to the 2010 Census, Gongjing District has a population of 226,704 inhabitants (2020).

== Administrative divisions ==
Gongjing administers 3 subdistricts and 7 towns:

subdistricts

- Wenxi 筱溪街道
- Gongjing 贡井街道
- Changtu 长土街道

towns

- Aiye 艾叶镇
- Jianshe 建设镇
- Longtan 龙潭镇
- Qiaotou 桥头镇
- Wubao 五宝镇
- Lianhua 莲花镇
- Chengjia 成佳镇
