= Qingshen County =

Qingshen County 青神县
- County
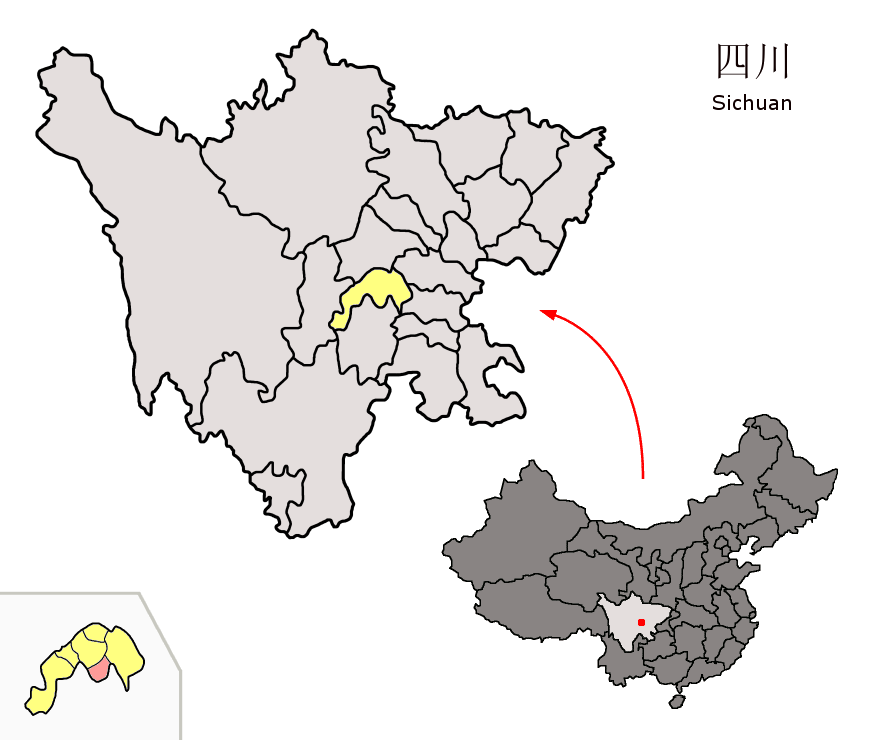
- Location of Qingshen County (red) within Meishan City (yellow) and Sichuan
- Coordinates: 29°49′52″N 103°50′49″E
- Country: China
- Province: Sichuan
- Prefecture-level city: Meishan

Area
  - Total: 386.8 km^{2} (149.3 sq mi)

Population (2020 census)
  - Total: 167,990
  - Density: 434.3/km^{2} (1,125/sq mi)
- Time zone: UTC+8 (China Standard)

Qingshen County (Chinese: 青神县; pinyin: Qīngshén Xiàn) is a county of Sichuan Province, China. It is under the administration of the prefecture-level city of Meishan.

== Administrative divisions ==
Qingshen County comprises 1 subdistrict, 4 towns and 2 townships:

subdistrict

- Qingzhu 青竹街道

towns

- Hanyang 汉阳镇
- Ruifeng 瑞峰镇
- Xilong 西龙镇
- Gaotai 高台镇

townships

- Baiguo 白果乡
- Luobo 罗波乡

== Climate ==
Climate data for Qingshen, elevation 455 m (1,493 ft), (1991–2020 normals, extremes 1981–present)
| Month | Jan | Feb | Mar | Apr | May | Jun | Jul | Aug | Sep | Oct | Nov | Dec | Year |
|---|---|---|---|---|---|---|---|---|---|---|---|---|---|
| Record high °C (°F) | 19.5 (67.1) | 24.0 (75.2) | 32.1 (89.8) | 33.5 (92.3) | 36.0 (96.8) | 36.4 (97.5) | 40.6 (105.1) | 41.3 (106.3) | 36.5 (97.7) | 29.9 (85.8) | 26.4 (79.5) | 18.9 (66.0) | 41.3 (106.3) |
| Mean daily maximum °C (°F) | 10.0 (50.0) | 13.1 (55.6) | 18.1 (64.6) | 23.7 (74.7) | 27.3 (81.1) | 29.1 (84.4) | 31.1 (88.0) | 30.9 (87.6) | 26.4 (79.5) | 21.4 (70.5) | 16.9 (62.4) | 11.4 (52.5) | 21.6 (70.9) |
| Daily mean °C (°F) | 6.7 (44.1) | 9.2 (48.6) | 13.4 (56.1) | 18.4 (65.1) | 22.2 (72.0) | 24.4 (75.9) | 26.3 (79.3) | 26.0 (78.8) | 22.4 (72.3) | 18.0 (64.4) | 13.5 (56.3) | 8.3 (46.9) | 17.4 (63.3) |
| Mean daily minimum °C (°F) | 4.3 (39.7) | 6.4 (43.5) | 10.0 (50.0) | 14.5 (58.1) | 18.4 (65.1) | 21.1 (70.0) | 23.0 (73.4) | 22.7 (72.9) | 19.8 (67.6) | 15.8 (60.4) | 11.1 (52.0) | 6.0 (42.8) | 14.4 (58.0) |
| Record low °C (°F) | −3.6 (25.5) | −1.3 (29.7) | −1.3 (29.7) | 4.5 (40.1) | 8.6 (47.5) | 14.3 (57.7) | 17.1 (62.8) | 15.8 (60.4) | 13.7 (56.7) | 5.0 (41.0) | 1.3 (34.3) | −3.4 (25.9) | −3.6 (25.5) |
| Average precipitation mm (inches) | 12.2 (0.48) | 17.9 (0.70) | 36.2 (1.43) | 68.4 (2.69) | 102.2 (4.02) | 141.9 (5.59) | 209.3 (8.24) | 251.1 (9.89) | 124.2 (4.89) | 54.5 (2.15) | 22.0 (0.87) | 10.8 (0.43) | 1,050.7 (41.38) |
| Average precipitation days (≥ 0.1 mm) | 8.8 | 9.4 | 12.2 | 13.7 | 14.3 | 15.8 | 16.0 | 15.5 | 16.0 | 15.7 | 8.8 | 7.7 | 153.9 |
| Average snowy days | 0.6 | 0.3 | 0 | 0 | 0 | 0 | 0 | 0 | 0 | 0 | 0 | 0.3 | 1.2 |
| Average relative humidity (%) | 84 | 81 | 77 | 76 | 74 | 80 | 83 | 82 | 84 | 85 | 84 | 84 | 81 |
| Mean monthly sunshine hours | 38.6 | 54.2 | 92.8 | 124.8 | 130.6 | 114.4 | 140.9 | 152.4 | 78.6 | 58.7 | 52.8 | 38.7 | 1,077.5 |
| Percentage possible sunshine | 12 | 17 | 25 | 32 | 31 | 27 | 33 | 38 | 22 | 17 | 17 | 12 | 24 |
Source: China Meteorological Administrationall-time extreme temperatureall-time July high
