= Mabian Yi Autonomous County =

Mabian County 马边县 • ꂶꀜꑤ
- Autonomous county
- 马边彝族自治县 • ꂶꀜꆈꌠꊨꏦꏱꅉꑤ; Mabian Yi Autonomous County
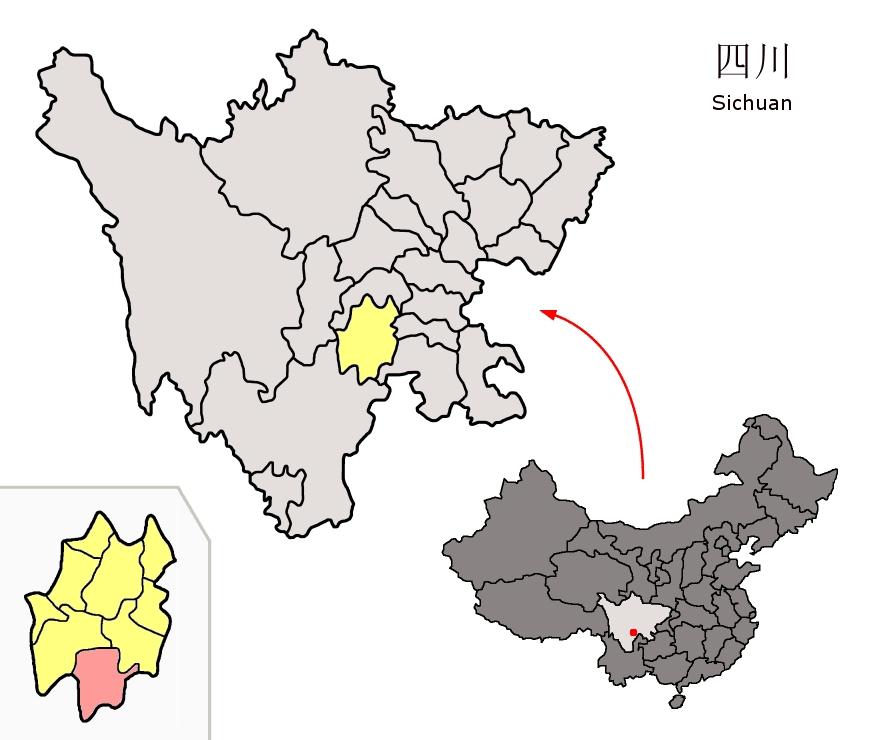
- Location of Mabian County (red) and Leshan (yellow) in Sichuan province

- Location of the seat in Sichuan
- Coordinates: 28°49′04″N 103°26′56″E
- Country: China
- Province: Sichuan
- Prefecture-level city: Leshan
- County seat: Minjian

Area
  - Total: 2,293 km^{2} (885 sq mi)
- Highest elevation: 4,042 m (13,261 ft)
- Lowest elevation: 448 m (1,470 ft)

Population (2020)
  - Total: 188,251
  - Density: 82.10/km^{2} (212.6/sq mi)
- Time zone: UTC+8 (China Standard)
- Website: www.mabian.gov.cn

Mabian Yi Autonomous County (simplified Chinese: 马边彝族自治县; traditional Chinese: 馬邊彝族自治縣; pinyin: Mǎbiān Yízú Zìzhìxiàn; Yi: ꂶꀜꆈꌠꊨꏦꏱꅉꑤ max bie nuo su zyt jie jux dde xiep) is a county of Sichuan Province, China. It is under the administration of Leshan city. In 2020 it had a population of 188,251. The population is 50.7% Yi minority people. Mabian is known throughout China for its green tea. Other local agricultural products are Gastrodia and bamboo shoots.

Mabian's Dafengding National Nature Reserve is home to giant pandas. Other touristic sites include traditional Yi villages.

== Administrative divisions ==
Mabian has jurisdiction over 12 towns and 3 townships:

Name	Simplified Chinese	Hanyu Pinyin	Yi	Romanized Yi	Administrative division code
Towns
Minjian Town	民建镇	Mínjiàn Zhèn	ꂱꏧꍔ	mip jiep zhep	511133100
Rongding Town	荣丁镇	Róngdīng Zhèn	ꑿꅑꍔ	yo ndit zhep	511133101
Xiaxi Town	下溪镇	Xiàxī Zhèn	ꑠꐔꍔ	xip qy zhep	511133102
Suba Town	苏坝镇	Sūbà Zhèn	ꌞꀡꍔ	sut bap zhep	511133103
Yanfeng Town	烟峰镇	Yānfēng Zhèn	ꑷꉘꍔ	yie hxo zhep	511133104
Laodong Town	劳动镇	Láodòng Zhèn	ꇊꄐꍔ	lop dop zhep	511133105
Qiaoba Town	荍坝镇	Qiáobà Zhèn	ꐇꀡꍔ	quop bap zhep	511133106
Jianshe Town	建设镇	Jiànshè Zhèn	ꏧꎹꍔ	jiep shep zhep	511133107
Minzhu Town	民主镇	Mínzhǔ Zhèn	ꂱꍗꍔ	mip zhu zhep	511133108
Meilin Town	梅林镇	Méilín Zhèn	ꃂꆀꍔ	me nip zhep	511133109
Xuekoushan Town	雪口山镇	Xuěkǒushān Zhèn	ꌤꃛꎭꍔ	syt fup sha zhep	511133110
Sanhekou Town	三河口镇	Sānhékǒu Zhèn	ꌐꃛꈑꍔ	sat fup kup zhep	511133111
Townships
Dazhubao Township	大竹堡乡	Dàzhúbǎo Xiāng	ꄊꎺꁍꑣ	dap shut pup xie	511133211
Gaozhuoying Township	高卓营乡	Gāozhuóyíng Xiāng	ꇰꍗꑴꑣ	ge zhu yip xie	511133223
Yonghong Township	永红乡	Yǒnghóng Xiāng	ꑿꉼꑣ	yo hop xie	511133226

== Climate ==
Climate data for Mabian, elevation 564 m (1,850 ft), (1991–2020 normals, extremes 1981–2010)
Month	Jan	Feb	Mar	Apr	May	Jun	Jul	Aug	Sep	Oct	Nov	Dec	Year
Record high °C (°F)	21.1 (70.0)	26.7 (80.1)	32.7 (90.9)	34.1 (93.4)	36.5 (97.7)	37.1 (98.8)	38.1 (100.6)	38.5 (101.3)	36.5 (97.7)	37.1 (98.8)	38.1 (100.6)	38.5 (101.3)	38.5 (101.3)
Mean daily maximum °C (°F)	10.8 (51.4)	13.5 (56.3)	18.3 (64.9)	23.7 (74.7)	27.0 (80.6)	28.8 (83.8)	31.2 (88.2)	30.9 (87.6)	26.5 (79.7)	21.4 (70.5)	17.4 (63.3)	12.2 (54.0)	21.8 (71.3)
Daily mean °C (°F)	7.5 (45.5)	9.7 (49.5)	13.5 (56.3)	18.1 (64.6)	21.4 (70.5)	23.7 (74.7)	25.6 (78.1)	25.3 (77.5)	22.0 (71.6)	17.7 (63.9)	13.8 (56.8)	9.0 (48.2)	17.3 (63.1)
Mean daily minimum °C (°F)	5.2 (41.4)	7.0 (44.6)	10.2 (50.4)	14.2 (57.6)	17.5 (63.5)	20.3 (68.5)	22.1 (71.8)	21.9 (71.4)	19.3 (66.7)	15.6 (60.1)	11.5 (52.7)	6.8 (44.2)	14.3 (57.7)
Record low °C (°F)	−3.0 (26.6)	−0.3 (31.5)	1.0 (33.8)	4.8 (40.6)	9.6 (49.3)	13.9 (57.0)	15.6 (60.1)	15.0 (59.0)	11.5 (52.7)	6.0 (42.8)	2.2 (36.0)	−1.2 (29.8)	−3.0 (26.6)
Average precipitation mm (inches)	5.9 (0.23)	9.5 (0.37)	32.6 (1.28)	64.0 (2.52)	97.8 (3.85)	132.7 (5.22)	230.8 (9.09)	250.7 (9.87)	113.5 (4.47)	49.9 (1.96)	19.4 (0.76)	5.2 (0.20)	1,012 (39.82)
Average precipitation days (≥ 0.1 mm)	7.0	9.1	13.6	15.2	16.8	18.7	18.9	19.0	18.7	18.5	10.5	6.2	172.2
Average snowy days	0.7	0.2	0	0	0	0	0	0	0	0	0	0.3	1.2
Average relative humidity (%)	76	76	75	74	76	80	82	82	84	84	81	78	79
Mean monthly sunshine hours	44.8	45.4	74.9	100.3	100.7	83.4	128.6	135.1	66.7	43.4	51.7	44.3	919.3
Percentage possible sunshine	14	14	20	26	24	20	30	33	18	12	16	14	20
Source: China Meteorological Administration

== People from Mabian ==
- He Changchun (贺昌群), historian (1903-1973)
