= Jialing, Nanchong =

Coordinates: 30°44′10″N 106°03′01″E

Jialing 嘉陵区
- District
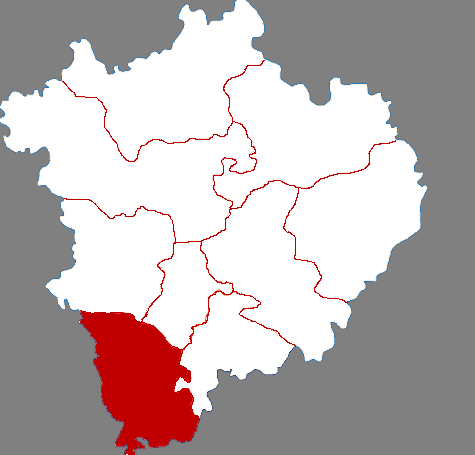
- Jialing in Nanchong

- Nanchong in Sichuan
- Country: China
- Province: Sichuan
- Prefecture-level city: Nanchong

Area
  - Total: 1,170 km^{2} (450 sq mi)

Population (2020)
  - Total: 531,825
  - Density: 455/km^{2} (1,180/sq mi)
- Time zone: UTC+8 (China Standard)

Jialing (Chinese: 嘉陵; pinyin: Jiālíng) is a district of the city of Nanchong, Sichuan Province, China.

== Administrative divisions ==
Jialing District comprises 5 subdistricts, 19 towns and 2 townships:

subdistricts

- Huohua 火花街道
- Duwei 都尉街道
- Wenfeng 文峰街道
- Xixing 西兴街道
- Nanhu 南湖街道

towns

- Qushui 曲水镇
- Lidu 李渡镇
- Ji'an 吉安镇
- Longling 龙岭镇
- Jinfeng 金凤镇
- Anfu 安福镇
- Anping 安平镇
- Shiyang 世阳镇
- Datong 大通镇
- Yili 一立镇
- Longpan 龙蟠镇
- Liba 里坝镇
- Jinbao 金宝镇
- Sanhui 三会镇
- Shuanggui 双桂镇
- Qibaosi 七宝寺镇
- Hexi 河西镇

townships

- Yanxi 盐溪乡
- Daxing 大兴乡
