= Qianfeng, Guang'an =

Qianfeng 前锋区
- District
- Location in Sichuan Qianfeng (China)
- Coordinates: 30°29′46″N 106°53′10″E
- Country: China
- Province: Sichuan
- Prefecture-level city: Guang'an
- Established: February 2013
- District seat: Dafosi

Area
  - Total: 505.6 km^{2} (195.2 sq mi)

Population (2020 census)
  - Total: 232,255
  - Density: 459.4/km^{2} (1,190/sq mi)
- Time zone: UTC+8 (China Standard Time)

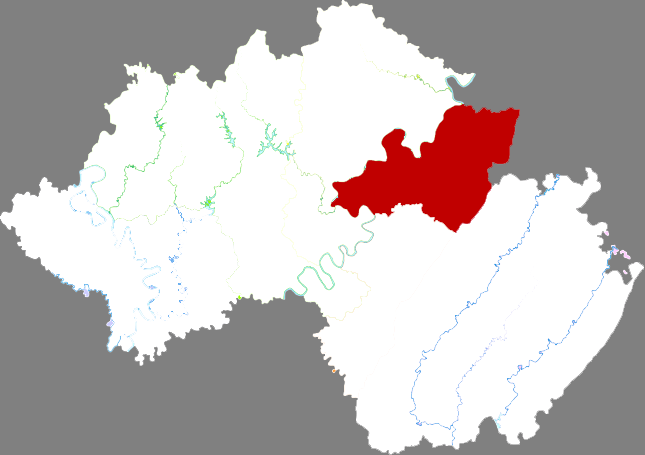

Qianfeng District (simplified Chinese: 前锋区; traditional Chinese: 前鋒區; pinyin: Qiánfēng Qū) is a district of the prefecture-level city of Guang'an in Sichuan province, China. It was created in February 2013 by splitting off a subdistrict, seven towns and five townships from Guang'an District. It governs an area of more than 500 square kilometres (190 sq mi). The seat of the district is at Qianfeng Town.

== Administrative divisions ==
Qianfeng District is divided into 4 subdistricts and 8 towns:

subdistricts

- Kuige Subdistrict (奎阁街道)
- Dafosi Subdistrict (大佛寺街道)
- Longtang Subdistrict (龙塘街道)
- Xinqiao Subdistrict (新桥街道)

towns

- Guixing Town (桂兴镇)
- Guange Town (观阁镇)
- Guangxing Town (广兴镇)
- Daishi Town (代市镇)
- Guantang Town (观塘镇)
- Hu'an Town (护安镇)
- Longtan Town (龙滩镇)
- Hucheng Town (虎城镇)
