= Yantan, Zigong =

District in Zigong, China

Yantan 沿滩区
- District
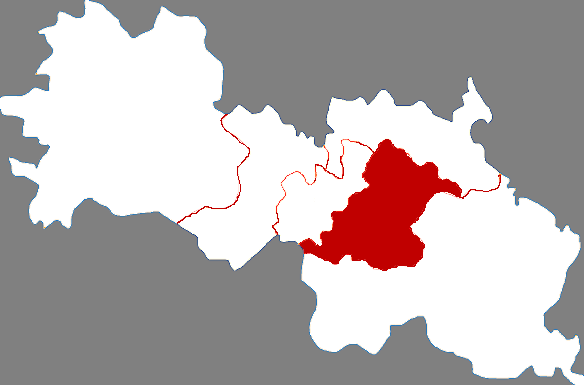
- Yantan in Zigong

- Zigong in Sichuan
- Coordinates: 29°15′45″N 104°51′34″E
- Country: China
- Province: Sichuan
- Prefecture-level city: Zigong
- District seat: Yantan Town

Area
  - Total: 467.99 km^{2} (180.69 sq mi)
- Elevation: 321 m (1,053 ft)

Population (2018)
  - Total: 388,000
  - Density: 829/km^{2} (2,150/sq mi)
- Time zone: UTC+8 (China Standard)

Yantan District (simplified Chinese: 沿滩区; traditional Chinese: 沿灘區; pinyin: Yántān Qū) is a district of the city of Zigong, Sichuan Province, China.

== Administrative divisions ==
Yantan administers 2 subdistricts, 9 towns and 1 township:

subdistricts

- Weiping 卫坪街道
- Dengguan 邓关街道

towns

- Yantan 沿滩镇
- Xinglong 兴隆镇
- Fuquan 富全镇
- Yong'an 永安镇
- Lianluo 联络镇
- Wangjing 王井镇
- Huangshi 黄市镇
- Washi 瓦市镇
- Xianshi 仙市镇

township

- Jiuhong 九洪乡
