= Ebian Yi Autonomous County =

Ebian County 峨边县 • ꊉꀜꑤ
- Autonomous County
- 峨边彝族自治县 • ꊉꀜꆈꌠꊨꏦꏱꅉꑤ; Ebian Yi Autonomous County
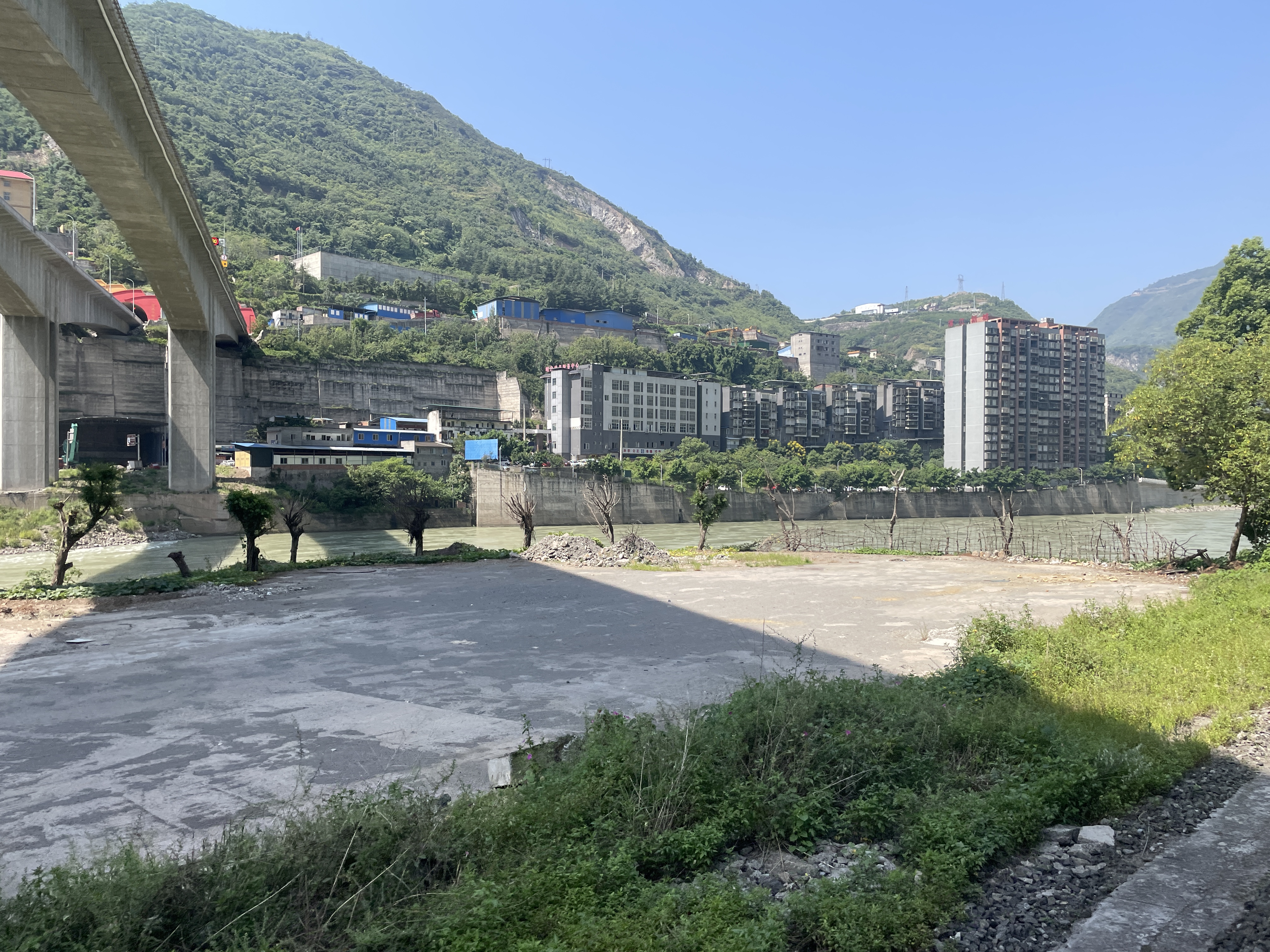

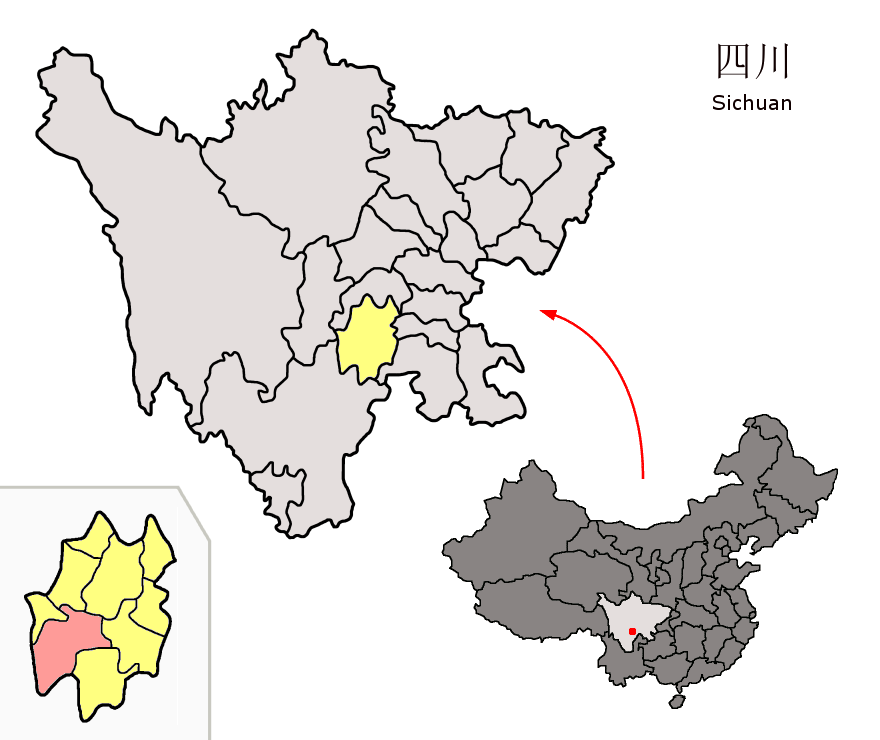
- Location of the county (red) in Leshan City (yellow) and Sichuan province

- Location of the seat in Sichuan
- Coordinates: 29.230°N 103.262°E
- Country: China
- Province: Sichuan
- Prefecture-level city: Leshan
- County seat: Shaping

Area
  - Total: 2,395 km^{2} (925 sq mi)

Population (2020 census)
  - Total: 121,554
  - Density: 50.75/km^{2} (131.5/sq mi)
- Time zone: UTC+8 (China Standard)
- Website: www.eb.gov.cn

Ebian Yi Autonomous County (simplified Chinese: 峨边彝族自治县; traditional Chinese: 峨邊彝族自治縣; pinyin: Ébiān Yízú Zìzhìxiàn; Yi: ꊉꀜꆈꌠꊨꏦꏱꅉꑤ wop bie nuo su zyt jie jux dde xiep) is a county of Sichuan Province, China. It is under the administration of Leshan city.

Heizhugou National Forest Park (黑竹沟国家森林公园), known as "China's Bermuda Triangle", is located at this county.

== Administrative divisions ==
Ebian County administers 7 towns and 6 townships.

Name	Simplified Chinese	Hanyu Pinyin	Yi	Romanized Yi	Administrative division code
Towns
Shaping Town	沙坪镇	Shāpíng Zhèn	ꎭꀻꍔ	sha pip zhep	511132100
Dabao Town	大堡镇	Dàbǎo Zhèn	ꄇꁍꍔ	dat pup zhep	511132101
Maoping Town	毛坪镇	Máopíng Zhèn	ꃀꀵꍔ	mop byp zhep	511132102
Wudu Town	五渡镇	Wǔdù Zhèn	ꃷꄖꍔ	vup du zhep	511132103
Xinlin Town	新林镇	Xīnlín Zhèn	ꑝꆀꍔ	xit nip zhep	511132104
Heizhugou Town	黑竹沟镇	Hēizhúgōu Zhèn	ꉿꍗꇫꍔ	hep zhu gox zhep	511132105
Hongqi Town	红旗镇	Hóngqí Zhèn	ꉼꐕꍔ	hop qyp zhep	511132106
Townships
Yiping Township	宜坪乡	Yípíng Xiāng	ꒉꁓꑣ	yy pyp xie	511132201
Yanghe Township	杨河乡	Yánghé Xiāng	ꑷꉼꑣ	yie hop xie	511132206
Xinchang Township	新场乡	Xīnchǎng Xiāng	ꌉꍰꑣ	sit chep xie	511132208
Pingdeng Township	平等乡	Píngděng Xiāng	ꀻꄒꑣ	pip de xie	511132209
Jinyan Township	金岩乡	Jīnyán Xiāng	ꏶꉞꑣ	jyt ngie xie	511132211
Lewu Township	勒乌乡	Lèwū Xiāng	ꆻꃹꑣ	liet vur xie	511132212

== Climate ==
Climate data for Ebian, elevation 642 m (2,106 ft), (1991–2020 normals, extremes 1981–2010)
Month	Jan	Feb	Mar	Apr	May	Jun	Jul	Aug	Sep	Oct	Nov	Dec	Year
Record high °C (°F)	19.6 (67.3)	23.9 (75.0)	31.3 (88.3)	32.9 (91.2)	35.7 (96.3)	36.7 (98.1)	36.8 (98.2)	37.6 (99.7)	35.2 (95.4)	29.9 (85.8)	25.1 (77.2)	23.4 (74.1)	37.6 (99.7)
Mean daily maximum °C (°F)	10.1 (50.2)	12.9 (55.2)	17.6 (63.7)	22.9 (73.2)	26.3 (79.3)	28.4 (83.1)	30.6 (87.1)	30.4 (86.7)	25.9 (78.6)	20.9 (69.6)	16.8 (62.2)	11.6 (52.9)	21.2 (70.2)
Daily mean °C (°F)	7.0 (44.6)	9.2 (48.6)	13.1 (55.6)	17.9 (64.2)	21.2 (70.2)	23.5 (74.3)	25.5 (77.9)	25.2 (77.4)	21.7 (71.1)	17.4 (63.3)	13.3 (55.9)	8.4 (47.1)	17.0 (62.5)
Mean daily minimum °C (°F)	4.6 (40.3)	6.5 (43.7)	9.8 (49.6)	14.1 (57.4)	17.4 (63.3)	20.1 (68.2)	21.9 (71.4)	21.6 (70.9)	18.9 (66.0)	15.1 (59.2)	10.9 (51.6)	6.2 (43.2)	13.9 (57.1)
Record low °C (°F)	−3.4 (25.9)	−1.6 (29.1)	−0.5 (31.1)	5.1 (41.2)	9.4 (48.9)	14.3 (57.7)	15.9 (60.6)	15.7 (60.3)	12.7 (54.9)	4.6 (40.3)	0.8 (33.4)	−2.0 (28.4)	−3.4 (25.9)
Average precipitation mm (inches)	3.5 (0.14)	8.6 (0.34)	30.9 (1.22)	71.0 (2.80)	92.0 (3.62)	115.7 (4.56)	147.8 (5.82)	175.6 (6.91)	84.7 (3.33)	41.1 (1.62)	15.9 (0.63)	3.6 (0.14)	790.4 (31.13)
Average precipitation days (≥ 0.1 mm)	5.7	7.3	12.1	15.0	16.0	17.9	16.2	15.5	15.8	15.5	7.6	5.5	150.1
Average snowy days	1.0	0.5	0	0	0	0	0	0	0	0	0	0.4	1.9
Average relative humidity (%)	75	74	72	72	72	78	80	80	82	83	79	76	77
Mean monthly sunshine hours	50.1	54.8	85.7	110.3	112.7	91.6	134.0	141.1	68.6	48.6	58.3	49.5	1,005.3
Percentage possible sunshine	15	17	23	28	27	22	32	35	19	14	18	16	22
Source: China Meteorological Administration
