= Peng'an County =

Peng'an County 蓬安县
- County
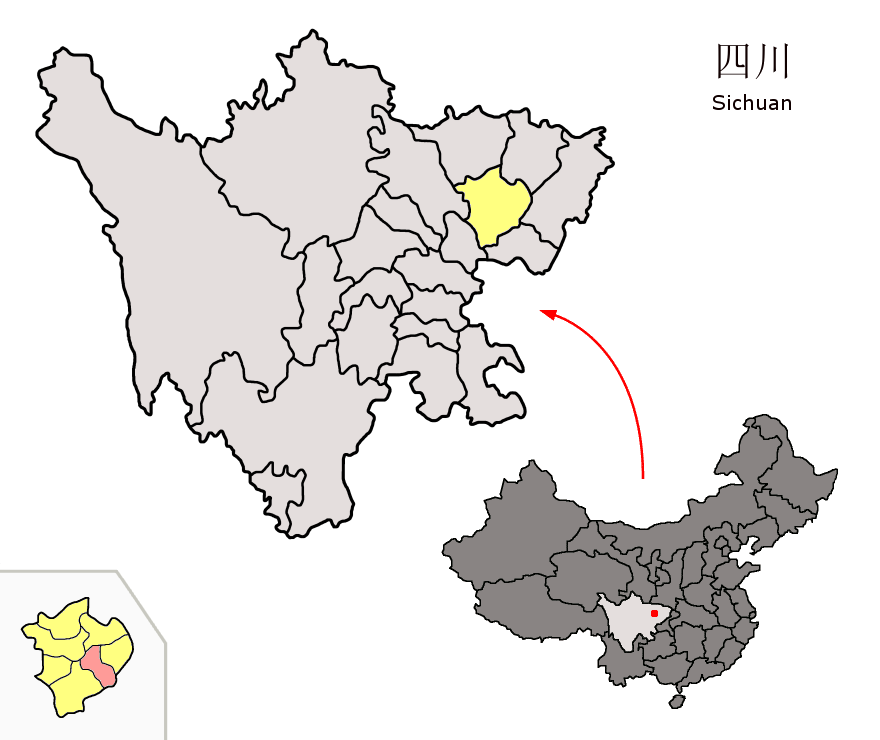
- Peng'an County (red) in Nanchong City (yellow) and Sichuan
- Coordinates: 31°01′44″N 106°24′43″E
- Country: China
- Province: Sichuan
- Prefecture-level city: Nanchong
- County seat: Xiangru (相如镇)

Area
  - Total: 1,334 km^{2} (515 sq mi)

Population (2020 census)
  - Total: 461,485
  - Density: 345.9/km^{2} (896.0/sq mi)
- Time zone: UTC+8 (China Standard)
- Postal code: 637800
- Area code: 0817
- Website: www.pengan.gov.cn

Peng'an County (Chinese: 蓬安县; pinyin: Péng'ān Xiàn) is a county in Nanchong, Sichuan, China.

Peng'an has an area of 1,334 square kilometers and a population of 461,485 as of 2020.

== Administrative divisions ==
Peng'an County comprises 2 subdistricts, 14 towns and 5 townships:

subdistricts

- Zhoukou 周口街道
- Xiangru 相如街道

towns

- Jinping 锦屏镇
- Julong 巨龙镇
- Zhengyuan 正源镇
- Jinxi 金溪镇
- Xujia 徐家镇
- Heshu 河舒镇
- Lixi 利溪镇
- Longcan 龙蚕镇
- Yangjia 杨家镇
- Luojia 罗家镇
- Fude 福德镇
- Yinhan 银汉镇
- Xingwang 兴旺镇
- Muba 睦坝镇

townships

- Pingtou 平头乡
- Xiandian 鲜店乡
- Jinjia 金甲乡
- Xinyuan 新园乡
- Shikong 石孔乡

== Climate ==
Climate data for Peng'an, elevation 325 m (1,066 ft), (1991–2020 normals, extremes 1981–present)
| Month | Jan | Feb | Mar | Apr | May | Jun | Jul | Aug | Sep | Oct | Nov | Dec | Year |
|---|---|---|---|---|---|---|---|---|---|---|---|---|---|
| Record high °C (°F) | 19.7 (67.5) | 22.9 (73.2) | 33.3 (91.9) | 36.0 (96.8) | 37.8 (100.0) | 37.6 (99.7) | 41.1 (106.0) | 41.6 (106.9) | 40.8 (105.4) | 34.3 (93.7) | 25.2 (77.4) | 17.5 (63.5) | 41.6 (106.9) |
| Mean daily maximum °C (°F) | 9.7 (49.5) | 12.8 (55.0) | 17.8 (64.0) | 23.5 (74.3) | 27.1 (80.8) | 29.5 (85.1) | 32.5 (90.5) | 32.8 (91.0) | 27.4 (81.3) | 21.5 (70.7) | 16.6 (61.9) | 10.8 (51.4) | 21.8 (71.3) |
| Daily mean °C (°F) | 6.6 (43.9) | 9.2 (48.6) | 13.4 (56.1) | 18.6 (65.5) | 22.3 (72.1) | 25.1 (77.2) | 28.0 (82.4) | 27.8 (82.0) | 23.3 (73.9) | 18.0 (64.4) | 13.2 (55.8) | 8.0 (46.4) | 17.8 (64.0) |
| Mean daily minimum °C (°F) | 4.3 (39.7) | 6.5 (43.7) | 10.2 (50.4) | 14.8 (58.6) | 18.6 (65.5) | 21.8 (71.2) | 24.5 (76.1) | 24.2 (75.6) | 20.4 (68.7) | 15.6 (60.1) | 10.9 (51.6) | 6.0 (42.8) | 14.8 (58.7) |
| Record low °C (°F) | −2.2 (28.0) | −1.3 (29.7) | −0.6 (30.9) | 4.5 (40.1) | 9.7 (49.5) | 13.8 (56.8) | 17.5 (63.5) | 16.8 (62.2) | 12.8 (55.0) | 3.1 (37.6) | 1.5 (34.7) | −4.3 (24.3) | −4.3 (24.3) |
| Average precipitation mm (inches) | 12.4 (0.49) | 14.9 (0.59) | 34.7 (1.37) | 67.8 (2.67) | 114.6 (4.51) | 147.8 (5.82) | 175.7 (6.92) | 146.6 (5.77) | 123.0 (4.84) | 85.1 (3.35) | 34.2 (1.35) | 15.0 (0.59) | 971.8 (38.27) |
| Average precipitation days (≥ 0.1 mm) | 8.0 | 7.5 | 9.7 | 11.4 | 13.0 | 13.8 | 13.1 | 10.7 | 12.8 | 14.5 | 9.1 | 8.1 | 131.7 |
| Average snowy days | 0.7 | 0.4 | 0 | 0 | 0 | 0 | 0 | 0 | 0 | 0 | 0 | 0.2 | 1.3 |
| Average relative humidity (%) | 82 | 78 | 74 | 72 | 73 | 78 | 77 | 74 | 80 | 85 | 84 | 85 | 79 |
| Mean monthly sunshine hours | 42.3 | 52.0 | 95.0 | 130.9 | 137.7 | 124.2 | 172.2 | 188.6 | 105.8 | 70.6 | 59.6 | 35.8 | 1,214.7 |
| Percentage possible sunshine | 13 | 16 | 25 | 34 | 32 | 29 | 40 | 46 | 29 | 20 | 19 | 11 | 26 |
Source: China Meteorological Administrationall-time July high
