= Xikang =

Nominal former province of the Republic of China

Xikang Province 西康省
- Province of the Republic of China (1939–1950)
- 1939–1950
- Xikang Province in the Republic of China
- Capital: Kangding (1912–1931); Ba'an (1931–1935); Ya'an (1935–1936); Kangding (1935–1949); Xichang (1949–1950)
- Area
  - Estimate: 451,521 km^{2} (174,333 sq mi)
- Population
  - Estimate: 1,748,458
- Historical era: 20th century
  - Established: 1939
  - Fall of Xichang: 27 March 1950
  - Disestablished: 1950
Preceded by	Succeeded by
Chuanbian Special Administrative District	Xikang; Chamdo Region
- Today part of: China; India

Xikang Province 西康省
- Province of the People's Republic of China (1950–1955)
- 1950–1955
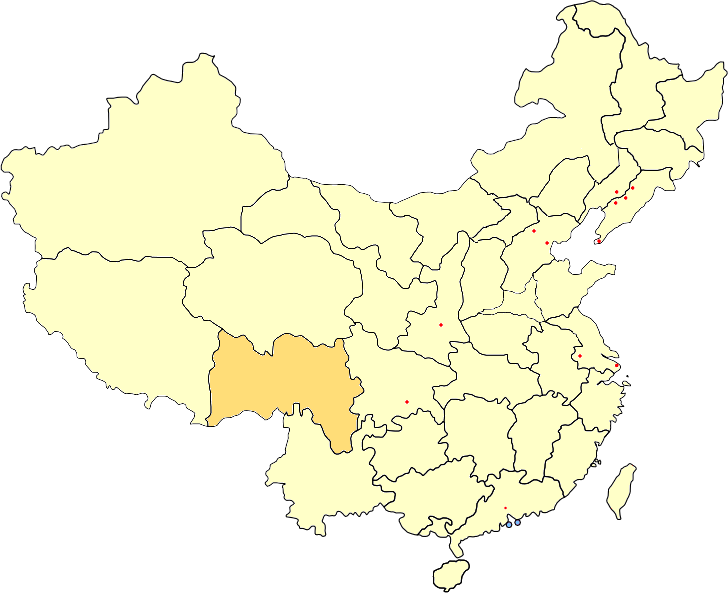
- Xikang Province (orange) in the People's Republic of China
- Capital: Kangding (1950–1951); Ya'an (1951–1955)
- Area
  - 1953: 451,521 km^{2} (174,333 sq mi)
- Population
  - 1953: 3,381,064
- Historical era: 20th century
  - Established: 1950
  - Disestablished: 1955
Preceded by	Succeeded by
Xikang	Sichuan; Tibet Autonomous Region
- Today part of: China; India

Xikang (formerly romanized as Sikang or Hsikang, lit. 'Kham-in-the-West' or 'Kham to the west [of Sichuan]') was a nominal province formed by the Republic of China in 1939 on the initiative of prominent Sichuan warlord Liu Wenhui and retained by the early People's Republic of China. The former territory of Xikang is now divided between the Tibet Autonomous Region (TAR) and Sichuan province.

The idea behind Xikang province was to form a single unified province for the entire Kham region under direct Chinese administration, in effect annexing the western Kham region that was then under Tibetan control. Kham was entirely populated by Tibetan people called Khampas. The then-independent Tibet controlled the portion of Kham west of the Upper Yangtze River. The nominal Xikang province also included in the south the Assam Himalayan region (Arunachal Pradesh) that Tibet had recognised as a part of British India by the 1914 McMahon Line agreement. The eastern part of the province was inhabited by a number of different ethnic groups, such as Han Chinese, Yi, Qiang people and Tibetan, then known as Chuanbian (川邊), a special administrative region of the Republic of China. In 1939, it became the new Xikang province with the additional territories belonging to Tibetan and British control added in. It was taken over by Chinese communist forces in 1949.

The provincial capital of Xikang was Kangding from 1939 to 1951 and Ya'an from 1951 to 1955. The province had a population of 3.4 million in 1954. In 1955, its eastern half was merged into Sichuan, and its western half came under the administration of the TAR preparatory committee.

== Overview ==
The idea of "Xikang" was to construct an independent province of China for the entire Kham region, which would be separate from Tibet as well as Sichuan. Even though it was defined in regulations and sketched out on maps, only the eastern Kham region was ever under the control of the Republic of China.

== History ==
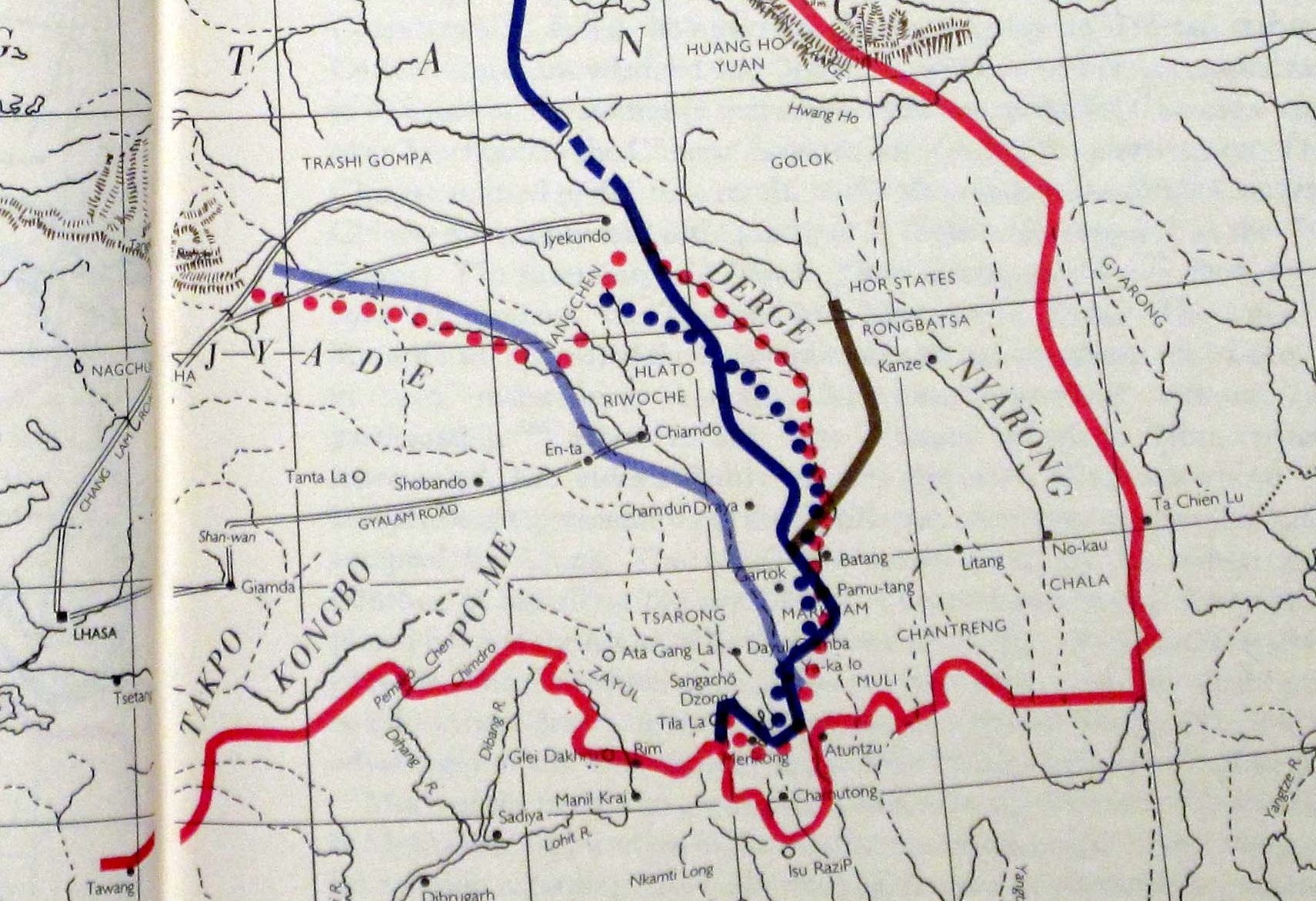
ROC's control in Kham: Light blue line on the west represents the boundary in 1912–1917, after which the ROC was pushed back to the brown line during 1918–1932. By 1945, it arrived at the dotted red line. The dark blue was the Simla Convention boundary that ROC turned down.

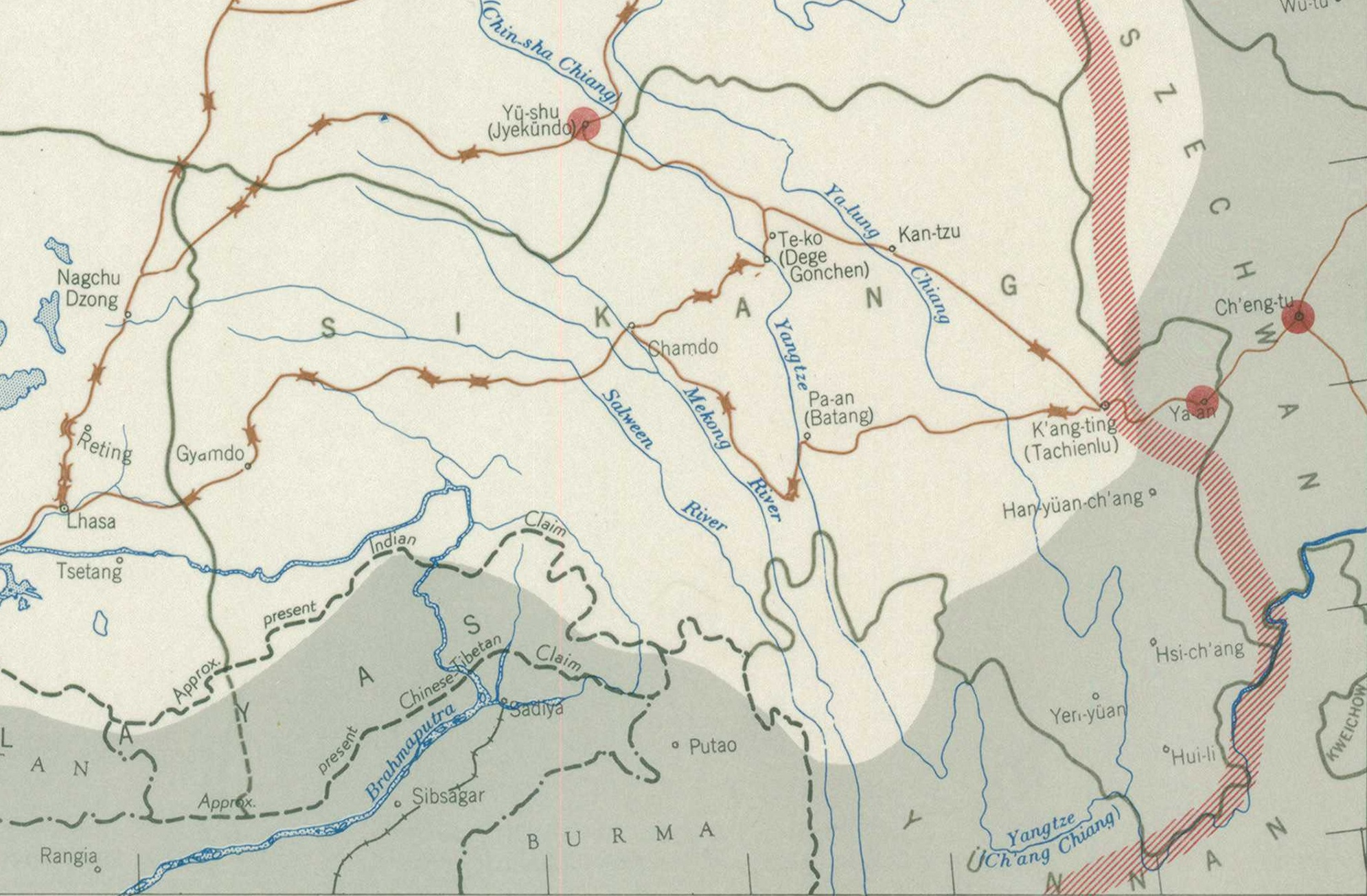
The Xikang province shown with a dark green line boundary (CIA, 1950)

Following the 1905 Batang uprising, Qing China appointed Zhao Erfeng as the Imperial Commissioner for the Sichuan-Yunnan Frontier. Zhao reduced all the autonomous native states in both the western and eastern Kham by 1910 and converted them into Chinese districts governed by magistrates. He signed an agreement with the Tibetan government setting the border between China and Tibet at Gyamda. This paved the way for the formation of a Xikang province, proposed by Zhang's successor Fu Songmu.

Following the Wuchang Uprising in October 1911, which led to the downfall of the Qing dynasty, the region subdued by Frontier Commissioners was established as the Chuanbian Special Administrative District (川邊特別行政區) by the newly founded Republic of China.

In June 1930, eastern Kham (later Xikang) was invaded by the army of Tibet, precipitating the Sino-Tibetan War. With the district locked in internal struggles, no reinforcements were sent to support the Sichuanese troops stationed here. As a result, the Tibetan army captured Garzê and Xinlong Counties without encountering much resistance. When a negotiated ceasefire failed, Tibetan forces expanded the war, attempting to capture parts of southern Qinghai province. In March 1932, their force invaded Qinghai but was defeated by the local Hui warlord Ma Bufang in July, who routed the Tibetan army and drove it back to this district.

The Hui army captured counties that had fallen into the hands of the Tibetan army since 1919. Their victories threatened the supply lines of the Tibetan forces in Garzê and Xinlong. As a result, part of the Tibetan army was forced to withdraw.

In 1932 Liu Wenhui in cooperation with the Qinghai army, sent out a brigade to attack the Tibetan troops in Garzê and Xinlong, eventually occupying them, Dêgê and other counties east of the Jinshajiang River. The 1934 Khamba Rebellion led by the Pandatsang family broke out against the Tibetan government in Lhasa. The Khampa revolutionary leader Pandatsang Rapga was involved.

In January 1939, the Chuanbian Special Administrative District officially became a province of the Republic, the Hsikang Province. Kesang Tsering was sent by the Chinese to Batang to take control of Xikang, where he formed a local government. He was sent there for the purpose of propagating the Three Principles of the People to the Khampa.

In 1949, the People's Liberation Army took control of Xikang. In 1955, eastern Xikang was merged into Sichuan, and western Xikang came under the administration of the Preparatory Committee for the Tibet Autonomous Region.

== Administrative divisions ==
=== 1939–1950 ===
Name	Administrative Seat	Traditional Chinese	Subdivisions	Comments
First Administrative Circuit	Kangding County	第一行政督察區	4 counties, 1 bureau	Later the Xikang Province Tibetan Autonomous Region
Second Administrative Circuit	Yingjing County	第二行政督察區	7 counties	Later the Ya'an Division
Third Administrative Circuit	Xichang County	第三行政督察區	9 counties, 3 bureaus	Later the XIchang Division
Fourth Administrative Circuit	Garzê County	第四行政督察區	15 counties	Later the Xikang Province Tibetan Autonomous Region
Fifth Administrative Circuit	—	第五行政督察區	13 counties	Chamdo Region; de facto controlled by Tibet

=== 1950–1955 ===
Name	Simplified Chinese	Hanyu Pinyin	Subdivisions
Ya'an (1951–1955)	雅安市	Yǎ'ān shì	1 city Ya'an
Ya'an Division	雅安专区	Yǎ'ān Zhuānqū	8 counties Ya'an (1950–1951), Baoxing, Lushan, Tianquan, Yingjing, Hanyuan, Mingshan (1951–1955), Shimian (1951–1955)
Xichang Division	西昌专区	Xīchāng Zhuānqū	13 counties Xichang, Yanyuan, Yanbian, Huili, Ningnan, Dechang, Zhaojue (1950–1952), Yuexi, Mianning, Jinkang (1952–1955), Muli (1952–1955), Miyi (1952–1955), Huidong; 3 bureaus Puge (1950–1952), Ningdong (1950–1952), Luoning (1950–1952)
Xikang Province Tibetan Autonomous Region	西康省藏族自治区	Xīkāng Shěng Zàngzú Zìzhìqū	20 counties direct controlled Kangding, Danba, Qianning, Yajiang, Luding, Jiulong; 1 bureau Jintang Ganzi Regional Office (1951–1955); Ganzi, Shiqi, Dengke, Dege, Baiyu, Zhanghua→Xinlong, Luhuo, Daofu Litang Regional Office (1951–1955); Litang, Batang, Derong, Dingxiang→Xiangcheng, Daocheng, Yidun
Liangshan Yi Autonomous Region (1952–1955)	凉山彝族自治区	Liángshān Yízú Zìzhìqū	8 counties Zhaojue, Puge, Ningdong, Xide, Butuo, Jinyang, Meigu, Puxiong

== List of governors ==
Kuomintang (Nationalist) Chinese Communist Party

=== Chairperson of the Provincial Government ===
No.	Portrait	Name (Birth–Death)	Term of office		Political party
1		Liu Wenhui 劉文輝; Liú Wénhuī (1895–1976)	1 January 1939	9 December 1949	Kuomintang
1		Liu Wenhui 劉文輝; Liú Wénhuī (1895–1976)	Defected to the Communists.		
2		Ho Kuo-kuang 賀國光; Hè Guóguāng (1885–1969)	25 December 1949	March 1950	Kuomintang
2		Ho Kuo-kuang 賀國光; Hè Guóguāng (1885–1969)	Fled to Taiwan via Haikou after fall of Xichang.		

=== Xikang CCP Committee Secretary ===
No.	Portrait	Name (Birth–Death)	Term of office		Political party
1		Liao Zhigao 廖志高; Liào Zhìgāo (1913–2000)	1950	1955	Chinese Communist Party
1		Liao Zhigao 廖志高; Liào Zhìgāo (1913–2000)	Province abolished.		

=== People's Government Chairperson/Governor ===
No.	Portrait	Name (Birth–Death)	Term of office		Political party
1		Liao Zhigao 廖志高; Liào Zhìgāo (1913–2000)	26 April 1950	September 1955	Chinese Communist Party
1		Liao Zhigao 廖志高; Liào Zhìgāo (1913–2000)	Province abolished.		

== See also ==
- Chinese irredentism § Taiwan
- Kham

== Bibliography ==
- Goldstein, Melvyn C. (1997), The Snow Lion and the Dragon: China, Tibet, and the Dalai Lama, University of California Press, ISBN 978-0-520-21951-9
- Lawson, Joe (2011), Xikang: Han Chinese in Sichuan's Western Frontier, 1905-1949 (PDF), Victoria University of Wellington
- Lin, Hsiao-ting (2004), "Boundary, sovereignty, and imagination: Reconsidering the frontier disputes between British India and Republican China, 1914–47", The Journal of Imperial and Commonwealth History, 32 (3): 25–47, doi:10.1080/0308653042000279650, S2CID 159560382
- Lin, Hsiao-ting (2010). Modern China's Ethnic Frontiers: A journey to the west. Taylor & Francis. ISBN 978-0-415-58264-3.
- McGranahan, Carole (Winter 2003), "From Simla to Rongbatsa: The British and the "Modern" Boundaries of Tibet", The Tibet Journal, 28 (4): 39–60, JSTOR 43302541
- Wang, Xiuyu (2011), China's Last Imperial Frontier: Late Qing Expansion in Sichuan's Tibetan Borderlands, Lexington Books, ISBN 978-0-7391-6809-7
