= Hu Changqing (general) =

Chinese general (1907–1950)

- 胡長青
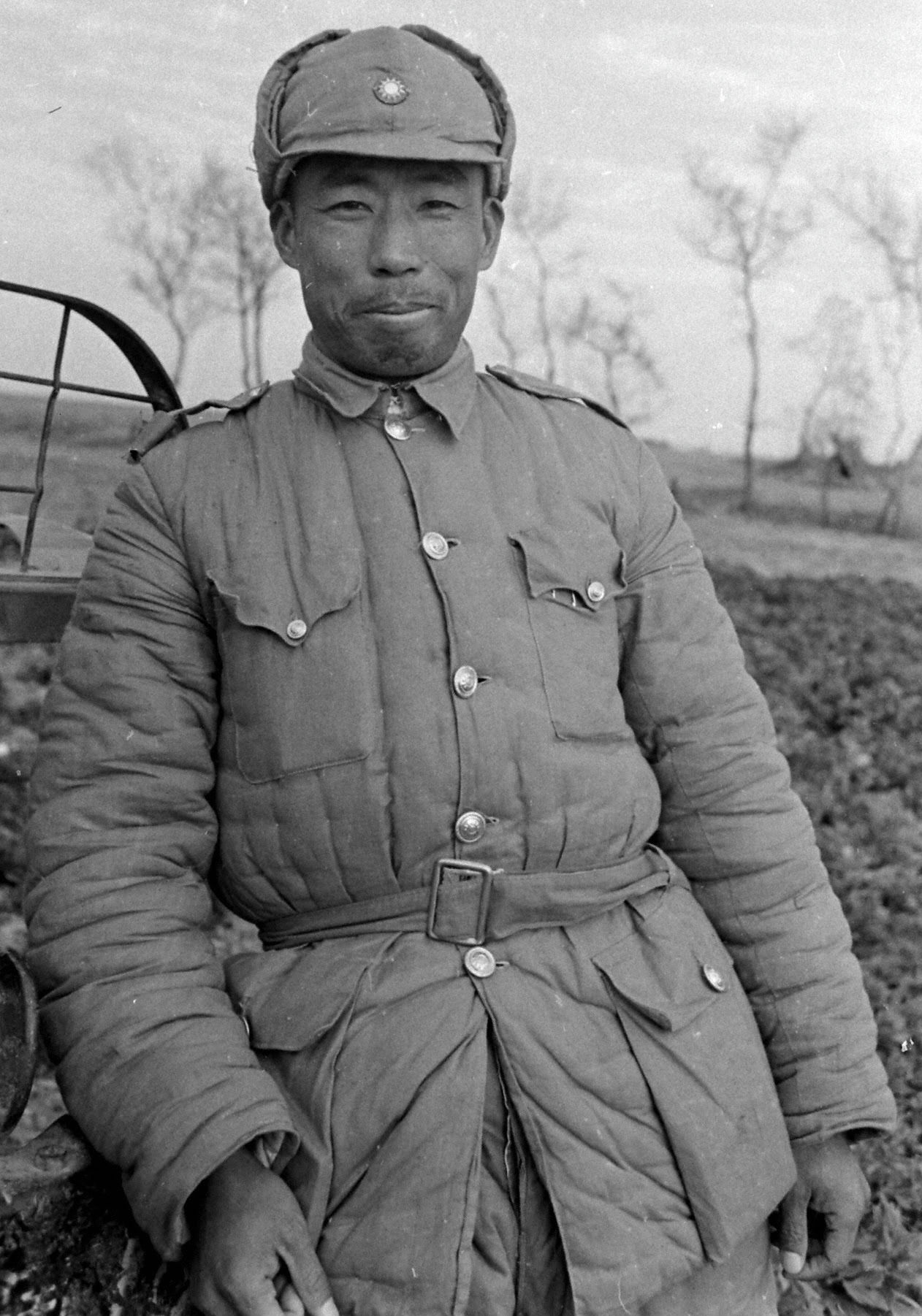
- Born: 2 October 1907; Linxiang, Hunan, Qing dynasty
- Died: 31 March 1950 (aged 42); Santai County, Xikang, People's Republic of China
- Education: Whampoa Military Academy; Army University
- Spouse: Huang Dexiu
- Children: 2
- Military career
- Allegiance: Republic of China
- Branch: (Republic of China (1912–1949)) National Revolutionary Army
- Rank: Lieutenant General (posthumously)
- Conflicts: Northern Expedition; Second Sino-Japanese War; Battle of Shanghai; Chinese Civil War; Battle of Xichang

Hu Changqing (Chinese: 胡長青; pinyin: Hú Chángqīng; Wade–Giles: Hu Ch'ang-ch'ing; 2 October 1907 – 31 March 1950) courtesy name, Nanzhang, was a Lieutenant General in the Republic of China Army from Linxiang, Hunan. He graduated from the Fourth Engineering Corps Class of the Whampoa Military Academy and the Ninth Class of the Army University. He died in 1950 during the Battle of Xichang during the Chinese Civil War, where he was wounded and committed suicide. He was posthumously promoted to lieutenant general in August 1971.

== Biography ==
Hu Changqing was born in October 1907 in Linjiatai, Tandu Township, Linxiang County, into a family of scholars. After graduating from Hunan No. 3 United Middle School, he abandoned his studies and took up arms, enrolling at the Whampoa Military Academy. In March 1926, Hu was enlisted in the Communications Corps of the Whampoa Military Academy's Engineering Battalion. After graduating in October 1926, he was assigned to the 24th Division of the National Revolutionary Army. The following year, during the Ninghan Split, the Nanjing Nationalist Government instigated the Wuhan faction led by Xia Douyin and Sichuan Army General Yang Sen to attack the Wuhan Nationalist Government. Hu's 24th Division defeated both Xia and Yang's forces, earning him recognition from Division Commander Ye Ting for his military exploits and leading him to participate in the subsequent Nanchang Uprising. A few years later, he joined his senior, Hu Zongnan, who appointed him as a communications staff officer and sponsored his admission to the ninth class of the Army University. After graduation, Hu Zongnan appointed him as the major battalion commander of the 1st Division's Independent Brigade. The following year, he was promoted to lieutenant colonel and chief of staff of the 2nd Brigade. In 1935, Hu Changqing was appointed Colonel Director of the First Division's General Staff Office.

In 1937, when the Second Sino-Japanese War broke out, Hu Changqing, then deputy commander of the 1st Brigade, participated in the Battle of Shanghai. The following February, he was promoted to brigadier general and subsequently transferred to command the 72nd Brigade of the 24th Division. In September of the same year, he was transferred to the 7th Branch of the Central Military Academy as deputy commander of the 8th Division. On 1 April 1942, Hu Changqing was transferred to command the 45th Division.

=== Chinese Civil War ===
On 29 September 1946, he was appointed Deputy Commander of the Fifth Army of the National Revolutionary Army, while also serving as Commander of the 45th Division. During this time, he was seriously wounded by a bullet to the right chest during the Battle of Dingtao, Shandong. In January 1947, Hu Changqing was appointed Commander of the 69th Division of the Reserve Force. He traveled to Guangzhou to reorganize the troops before relocating them to Zhengzhou. In September 1948, the 69th Division was reorganized into the 99th Army of the National Revolutionary Army and sent to Guzhen County to prepare for the Battle of Xuzhou-Bengbu. However, the Nationalist forces suffered a defeat and were forced to retreat to Xuancheng, Anhui. On 20 April 1949, the Communist Army crossed the Yangtze River. The Nationalist river defense forces were unable to resist, and Hu Changqing's 99th Army's 92nd and 268th Divisions were defeated. The 99th Army fled to Shanghai. Hu attempted suicide twice during battles that failed.

In September 1949, Hu Changqing, who was recuperating in Guangzhou, received an invitation from Hu Zongnan to go to Santai County, Xikang to take over the post of commander of the 69th Army. In times of crisis, Hu Zongnan appointed Hu Changqing as the acting commander of the Fifth Corps and the commander-in-chief of the Second Route Army of the Anti-Communist National Salvation Army, and asked him to take on the important task of defending Xikang. In March 1950, Hu Changqing's troops were besieged and defeated by more than 100,000 People's Liberation Army soldiers in the Xichang area, but they still fought hard along the way. When they arrived in Xide County on the 28th, they were attacked by Yi's forces and were seriously injured. He fought resolutely to the last man and refused the PLA's surrender. On 31 March 1950, Hu Changqing died at Menghuo Ridge with his gun raised when he ran out of ammunition and aid. He left his wife and children in Taiwan.

=== Posthumous honors ===
The Army Officer School in Fengshan District, Kaohsiung named the student dormitory in the North Camp of the school "Changqing Building" (Building 7). In March 1969, he was enshrined in the National Revolutionary Martyrs' Shrine. On 17 August 1971, Hu Changqing was commended by the government of the Republic of China and awarded the Certificate of Loyalty and was posthumously promoted to the rank of Lieutenant General of the Army.
