= Zhang Zuoha =

Chinese politician (born 1950)

- 张作哈

Governor of Liangshan Yi Autonomous Prefecture
- In office March 1999 – January 2003
- Preceded by: Ma Kaiming
- Succeeded by: Liu Shaoxian

Personal details
- Born: August 1950 (age 76) Yuexi County, Sichuan, China
- Party: Chinese Communist Party
- Education: Chengdu Sport University; Central Party School of the Chinese Communist Party

Chinese name
- Simplified Chinese: 张作哈
- Traditional Chinese: 張作哈
Transcriptions
Standard Mandarin
- Hanyu Pinyin: Zhāng Zuóhā

Zhang Zuoha (Chinese: 张作哈; born August 1950) is a Chinese politician who served as governor of Liangshan Yi Autonomous Prefecture from 1999 to 2003. He was a delegate to the 12th National People's Congress.

== Biography ==
Zhang was born in Yuexi County, Sichuan, in August 1950. During the Cultural Revolution, he was a sent-down youth from October 1969 to September 1973. After graduating from Chengdu Sport University in August 1976, he became a coach of the Sports Committee of Yuexi County.

Zhang began his political career in July 1981, when he was appointed deputy director of Yuexi County Culture and Education Bureau. He became leader of the Song and Dance Troupe of Liangshan Yi Autonomous Prefecture in February 1984, but having held the position for only two years. He was director of the Cultural Bureau of Liangshan Yi Autonomous Prefecture in March 1986 and subsequently director of Liangshan Yi Autonomous Prefecture Education Committee in December 1992. In August 1993, he rose to become vice governor of Liangshan Yi Autonomous Prefecture. He was deputy party secretary of Liangshan Yi Autonomous Prefecture in December 1995, in addition to serving as governor since March 1999. In January 2003, he was promoted again to vice governor of Sichuan, and served until October 2011, when he took office as a high counselor of Sichuan government.

Government offices
Preceded by Ma Kaiming	Governor of Liangshan Yi Autonomous Prefecture; 1999–2003	Succeeded by Liu Shaoxian
