= Ma Kaiming =

Chinese politician (1944–2007)

- 马开明

Governor of Liangshan Yi Autonomous Prefecture
- In office March 1991 – March 1999
- Preceded by: Liu Shaoxian
- Succeeded by: Zhang Zuoha

Personal details
- Born: August 1944 Leibo County, Sichuan, China
- Died: 12 October 2007 (aged 63) Sichuan, China
- Party: Chinese Communist Party
- Education: Central University for Nationalities; Central Party School of the Chinese Communist Party

Chinese name
- Simplified Chinese: 马开明
- Traditional Chinese: 馬開明
Transcriptions
Standard Mandarin
- Hanyu Pinyin: Mǎ Kāimíng

Ma Kaiming (Chinese: 马开明; born August 1944 – 12 October 2007) was a Chinese politician of Yi ethnicity who served as governor of Liangshan Yi Autonomous Prefecture from 1991 to 1999. He was a delegate to the 8th and 9th National People's Congress.

== Biography ==
Ma was born in Leibo County, Sichuan, in August 1944. In September 1963, he was accepted to Central University for Nationalities, where he graduated in October 1966.

Ma joined the Chinese Communist Party (CCP) in March 1966 and worked at Meigu County High School between 1968 and 1980. Starting in September 1980, he successively served as deputy magistrate, deputy party secretary, and magistrate of Meigu County. In March 1988, he was appointed as party secretary of Butuo County. In June 1988, he was admitted to member of the Standing Committee of the CCP Liangshan Yi Autonomous Prefectural Committee, the prefecture's top authority. In February 1990, he became vice governor of Liangshan Yi Autonomous Prefecture, rising to governor the next year. He was promoted to assistant governor of Sichuan in February 1999. In February 2001, he was promoted again to become vice governor of Sichuan. In January 2003, he was chosen as vice chairman of Sichuan Provincial People's Congress.

Ma died unexpectedly on 12 October 2007, at the age of 63.

Government offices
Preceded by Liu Shaoxian	Governor of Liangshan Yi Autonomous Prefecture; 1991–1999	Succeeded by Zhang Zuoha
