= Guli, Zhaojue =

Guli Town 古里镇
- Town
- Location in Sichuan
- Coordinates: 28°2′52″N 103°13′21″E
- Country: People's Republic of China
- Province: Sichuan
- Autonomous prefecture: Liangshan Yi Autonomous Prefecture
- County: Zhaojue County
- Time zone: UTC+8 (China Standard)

Guli Town (Chinese: 古里镇) is a town in Zhaojue County, Liangshan Yi Autonomous Prefecture, Sichuan, China. Up to 2021 it was known under the name Longgou Township. In 2010, Longgou had a total population of 1,833: 978 males and 855 females: 602 aged under 14, 1,133 aged between 15 and 65 and 98 aged over 65.
