= Huidong =

Huidong may refer to:

- Huidong County, Guangdong (惠东县), China
- Huidong County, Sichuan (会东县), China
