= Yundian, Sichuan =

Yundian 云甸镇
- Town
- Yundianzhen
- Location in Sichuan
- Coordinates: 27°3′7″N 102°15′37″E
- Country: People's Republic of China
- Province: Sichuan
- Autonomous prefecture: Liangshan Yi Autonomous Prefecture
- County: Huili County

Area
  - Total: 115.2 km^{2} (44.5 sq mi)

Population (2010)
  - Total: 15,858
  - Density: 137.7/km^{2} (356.5/sq mi)
- Time zone: UTC+8 (China Standard)

Yundian (Chinese: 云甸镇) is a town in Huili County, Liangshan Yi Autonomous Prefecture, Sichuan, China. In 2010, Yundian had a total population of 15,858: 8,115 males and 7,743 females: 3,200 aged under 14, 11,210 aged between 15 and 65 and 1,448 aged over 65.
