= Chengbei Township, Zhaojue County =

Chengbei Township 城北乡
- Township
- Location in Sichuan
- Coordinates: 28°01′46″N 102°51′24″E
- Country: People's Republic of China
- Province: Sichuan
- Autonomous prefecture: Liangshan
- County: Zhaojue
- Elevation: 2,101 m (6,893 ft)
- Time zone: UTC+8 (China Standard)

Chengbei (Chinese: 城北; pinyin: Chéngběi; lit. 'city north') is a township of Zhaojue County in the north-central part of the Liangshan Yi Autonomous Prefecture in southern Sichuan province, China, located about 2 kilometres (1.2 mi) northeast of the county seat. As of 2011, it has 6 villages under its administration.

== See also ==
- List of township-level divisions of Sichuan
