= Xide County =

Xide County 喜德县 • ꑝꅇꑤ
- County
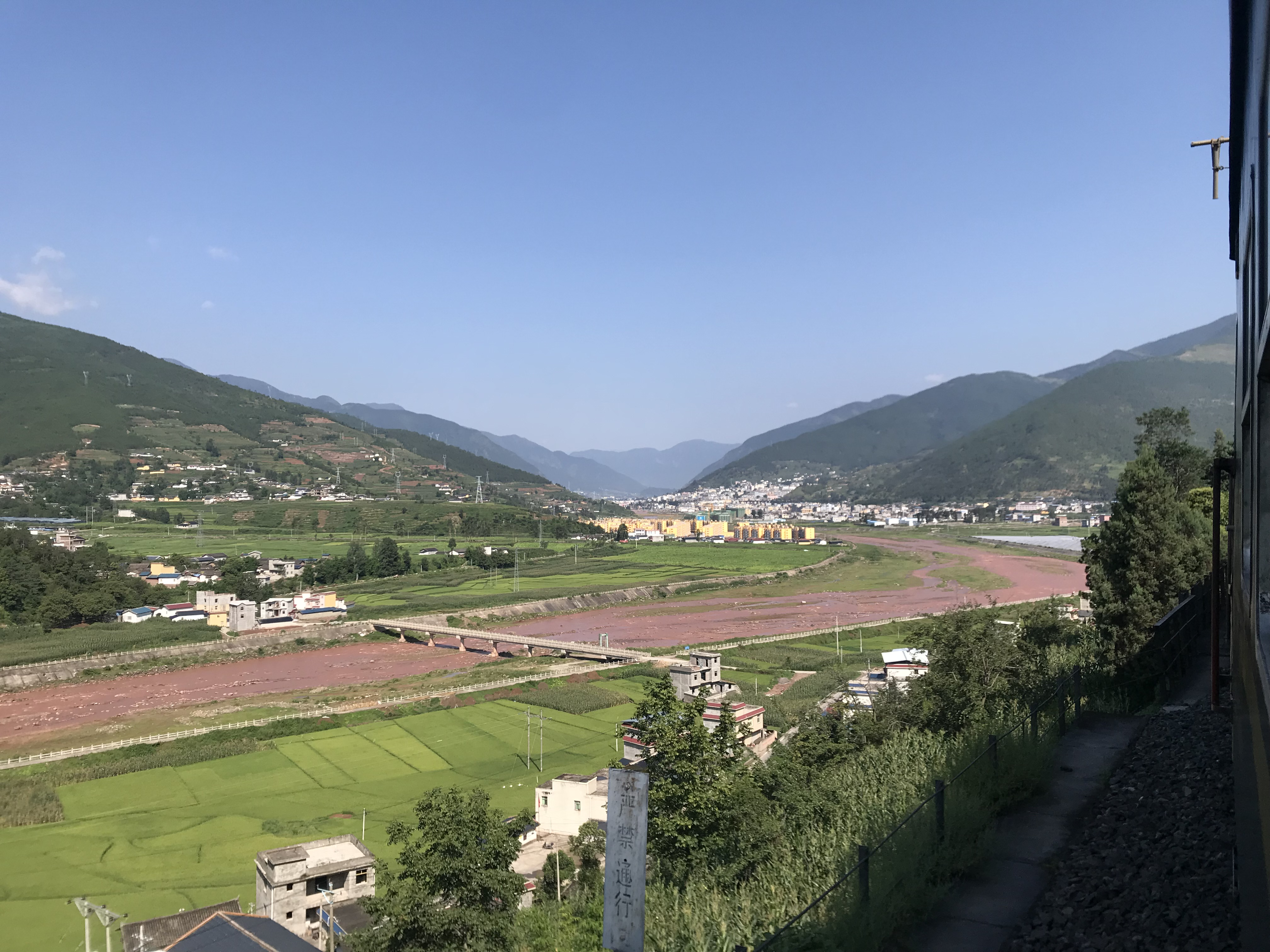

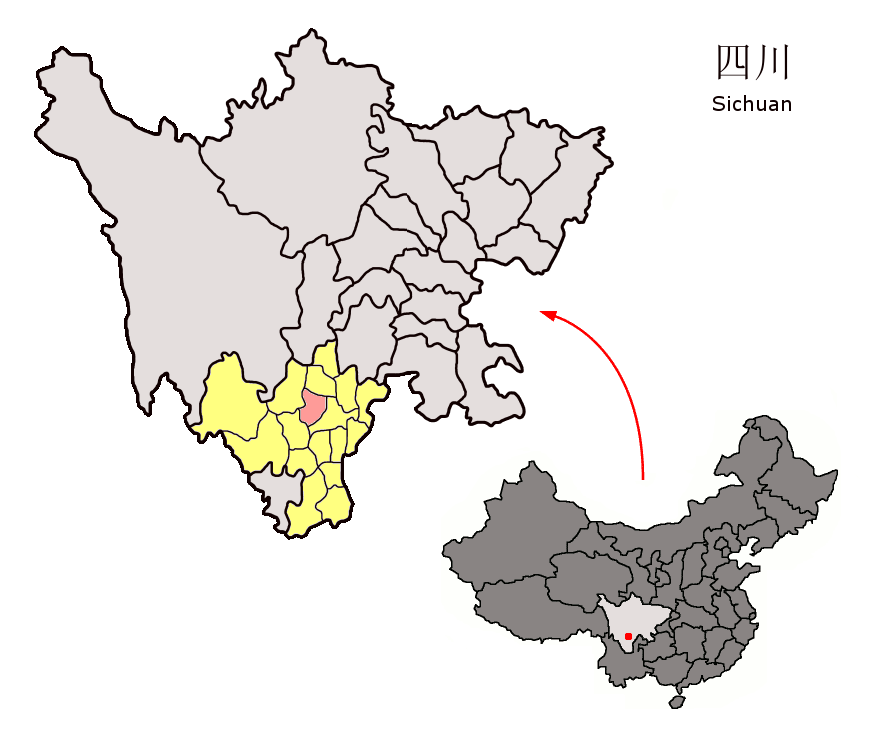
- Location of Xide County (red) within Liangshan Prefecture (yellow) and Sichuan

- Location of the seat in Sichuan Xide (China)
- Coordinates: 28°18′25″N 102°24′47″E
- Country: China
- Province: Sichuan
- Autonomous prefecture: Liangshan
- County seat: Guangming

Area
  - Total: 2,206 km^{2} (852 sq mi)

Population (2020)
  - Total: 158,139
  - Density: 71.69/km^{2} (185.7/sq mi)
- Time zone: UTC+8 (China Standard)
- Website: www.scxd.gov.cn

Xide County

Chinese name
- Simplified Chinese: 喜德县
- Traditional Chinese: 喜德縣
Transcriptions
Standard Mandarin
- Hanyu Pinyin: Xǐdé Xiàn

Yi name
- Yi: ꑝꅇꑤ; Romanisation: xit ddop xiep IPA: /ɕɪ˥dʊ˨˩ ɕɛ˨˩/

Xide County (Chinese: 喜德县, Yi: ꑝꅇꑤ) is a county in the south of Sichuan Province, China. It is under the administration of the Liangshan Yi Autonomous Prefecture. It is located in the southwestern mountainous area of the Sichuan Basin, in the north-central area of Liangshan Yi Autonomous Prefecture. Xide County is bounded in the east by Zhaojue County, in the south by Xichang, in the west by Mianning County, and in the north by Yuexi County. As of 2020, it has an estimated population of 158,000 covering a total area of 2,206 square kilometers. The northern dialect of Yi language is commonly used, and the Yi language of Sichuan is based on the pronunciation of Xide County.

== History ==
From the Han dynasty to the Wei, Jin, Southern and Northern Dynasties, the northern part of Xide belonged to Taitung County, the southern part belonged to Sushi County, and the area around Beishan Township belonged to Qiong Du County. At the beginning of the Tang Dynasty, the Xide area belonged to Yueqi County, and later changed to Jingzhou. At the end of the Tang Dynasty, it belonged to Nanzhao, and Nanzhao changed Zhangzhou to Jianchang House. Dali set up two forest departments between Taiping and Qiang Du, and the county belonged to it. In the Yuan Dynasty, the Xide area belonged to Luo Luos Xuanwei Division, Jianchang Road, and Qiang Du Prefecture, while the Yi area belonged to the Tusi surnamed Ling. In the Ming Dynasty, the northern part of Xide belonged to Ningfan Wei, and the southern part belonged to Jianchang Wei. In 1730, Mianshan branch was established in Mianshan, Mianning County. In the early years of the Republic of China, Xide belonged to three counties of Xichang, Mianning, and Yueqi. In 1938, Zhaojue County, Mianning County and Yueqi County were analyzed and set up in Ningdong. In 1939, it was transferred to the newly established Xikang Province. In 1941, the Beishan Model Political Guidance Area was established. In 1950, Jingyuan District, the fourth district of Mianning County, was established.

In 1951, the southwest of the former Ningdong Administrative Bureau and the Beishan Model Political Guidance District merged to establish the Hongmao Magu Yi Autonomous Region in Xichang County. In 1952, Xichang County belonged to Hongmao Magu Yi Autonomous Region and Mianning County belonged to the fourth district merged to establish Xide County, which belongs to Liangshan Yi Autonomous Region. In 1955, Liangshan Yi Autonomous Region was changed to Liangshan Yi Autonomous Prefecture and was placed under Sichuan Province. In November 2020, Sichuan Province approved Xide County to withdraw from poverty-stricken counties. Xide in north central Liangshan was once classified as a national-level poverty-stricken county. In November 2020, Sichuan's provincial government announced that the seven remaining impoverished counties in the prefecture, including Xide County, had removed their "hats of poverty" after five painstaking years of targeted poverty alleviation work.

== Geography ==
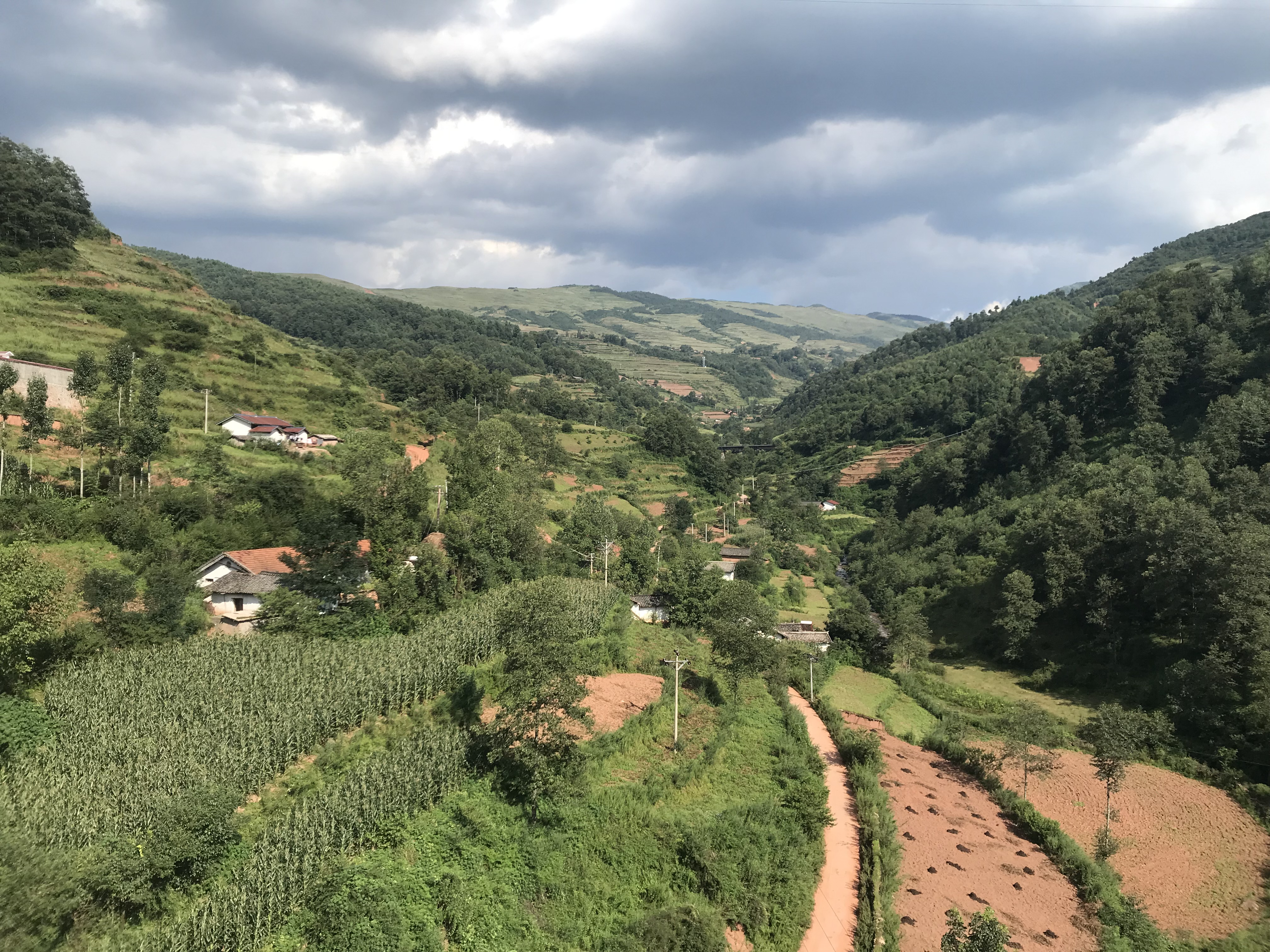

Xide County is located in the northern section of the north–south Yunnan tectonic belt. Folds and faults coexist in the territory, and the rock strata in the territory cross the stratigraphic area in the asbestos stratigraphic district and the oblique stratigraphic area in Mishi. The terrain is high in the northeast and low in the southwest, and the mountains and rivers are mostly north–south. The highest point is located in the main peak of Erze Russia in Xiaoxiangling, with an altitude of 4500.4 meters, and the lowest point is located in Hong Shinzui, Lizi Township, with an altitude of 1580 meters. Ditch and dam account for 3.82%, which is the main rice producing area; The mesa accounts for 0.86%, which is the main potato producing area; Deep hills accounted for 0.39%; low and medium mountains accounted for 34.42%; Moderate mountains account for 60%, with a large number of natural grasslands and forests; Mountain plains account for 0.34%, mostly high-altitude natural grasslands with flat terrain; High mountains account for 0.17%, mainly distributed in the Erze Russia area at the southern end of the Xiaoxiang Mountains.

The existing vegetation in Xide County is mostly artificial afforestation and afforestation by aircraft planting. There are more than 270 kinds of vegetation, and there are more than 100 kinds of common tree species in more than 70 families. The total forest area is more than 1.689 million mu, including 56,000 hectares (140,000 acres) of aircraft planting forest, more than 40,000 hectares (99,000 acres) of natural forest, and 7,200 hectares (18,000 acres) of farmland converted to forest. National first- and second-level protected animals include macaques, pangolins, Asian black bears, red pandas, leopards, and civet cats, and first-level national protected plants include yew and dove tree. The total amount of water resources in the county is 2.418 billion cubic meters, and the annual runoff is 1.38 billion cubic meters. The theoretical reserves of hydropower resources are 380,760 kilowatts, and the exploitable capacity is 128,440 kilowatts.

== Climate ==
The climate of Xide County belongs to the transition zone between the Yajiang warm temperate zone and the subtropical climate zone of Xichang and Batang. It is dry but not cold in winter and cool but rainy in summer. The complex topography in the county results in an obvious three-dimensional climate. The annual average temperature is 14 °C, the average temperature in July is 20.8 °C, and the average temperature in January is 5.7 °C. The average annual sunshine hours is 2016 hours, and the average annual rainfall is 1034.2 mm. The rainfall from mid-May to mid-October accounts for 87.3% of the annual rainfall.

Climate data for Xide, elevation 1,818 m (5,965 ft), (1991–2020 normals, extremes 1991–present)
Month	Jan	Feb	Mar	Apr	May	Jun	Jul	Aug	Sep	Oct	Nov	Dec	Year
Record high °C (°F)	23.4 (74.1)	28.1 (82.6)	30.5 (86.9)	33.6 (92.5)	36.1 (97.0)	37.7 (99.9)	33.5 (92.3)	34.4 (93.9)	32.4 (90.3)	30.0 (86.0)	26.6 (79.9)	22.5 (72.5)	37.7 (99.9)
Mean daily maximum °C (°F)	14.1 (57.4)	17.0 (62.6)	21.0 (69.8)	23.9 (75.0)	25.3 (77.5)	25.1 (77.2)	26.3 (79.3)	26.5 (79.7)	23.4 (74.1)	20.0 (68.0)	17.4 (63.3)	13.9 (57.0)	21.2 (70.1)
Daily mean °C (°F)	6.4 (43.5)	9.0 (48.2)	12.6 (54.7)	15.9 (60.6)	18.4 (65.1)	19.8 (67.6)	20.8 (69.4)	20.6 (69.1)	18.1 (64.6)	14.8 (58.6)	10.8 (51.4)	7.1 (44.8)	14.5 (58.1)
Mean daily minimum °C (°F)	1.0 (33.8)	2.9 (37.2)	6.1 (43.0)	9.7 (49.5)	13.3 (55.9)	16.0 (60.8)	17.2 (63.0)	16.7 (62.1)	14.7 (58.5)	11.4 (52.5)	6.4 (43.5)	2.5 (36.5)	9.8 (49.7)
Record low °C (°F)	−6.2 (20.8)	−7.1 (19.2)	−1.6 (29.1)	0.3 (32.5)	4.0 (39.2)	8.5 (47.3)	11.8 (53.2)	11.2 (52.2)	7.4 (45.3)	3.9 (39.0)	−2.8 (27.0)	−4.5 (23.9)	−7.1 (19.2)
Average precipitation mm (inches)	3.4 (0.13)	4.2 (0.17)	18.6 (0.73)	39.7 (1.56)	100.5 (3.96)	212.1 (8.35)	227.8 (8.97)	176.4 (6.94)	152.2 (5.99)	64.7 (2.55)	16.7 (0.66)	2.7 (0.11)	1,019 (40.12)
Average precipitation days (≥ 0.1 mm)	2.2	2.8	6.9	11.3	15.5	20.9	19.8	18.4	17.5	13.4	5.0	1.9	135.6
Average snowy days	3.4	3.0	1.1	0	0	0	0	0	0	0	0.6	2.1	10.2
Average relative humidity (%)	57	51	51	55	61	73	78	76	78	73	68	63	65
Mean monthly sunshine hours	207.4	202.9	233.3	217.2	187.4	109.2	134.7	154.9	108.4	119.2	168.7	178.0	2,021.3
Percentage possible sunshine	63	64	62	56	45	26	32	38	30	34	53	56	47
Source: China Meteorological Administration All-time October highall-time November record high

== Administrative divisions ==
Xide County comprises 7 towns and 6 townships.

Name	Simplified Chinese	Hanyu Pinyin	Yi	Romanized Yi	Administrative division code
Towns
Guangming Town	光明镇	Guāngmíng Zhèn	ꇨꂱꍔ	guo mip zhep	513432100
Mianshan Town	冕山镇	Miǎnshān Zhèn	ꂲꎭꍔ	miex sha zhep	513432101
Hongmo Town	红莫镇	Hóngmò Zhèn	ꉙꃀꍔ	hxop mop zhep	513432102
Lianghekou Town	两河口镇	Liǎnghékǒu Zhèn	ꆂꉼꈇꍔ	nie hop kox zhep	513432103
Mishi Town	米市镇	Mǐshì Zhèn	ꁶꏂꍔ	nbit shy zhep	513432104
Luoha Town	洛哈镇	Luòhā Zhèn	ꇉꉱꍔ	lo hat zhep	513432105
Nibo Town	尼波镇	Níbō Zhèn	ꐳꁧꍔ	nji bbo zhep	513432106
Townships
Heboluo Township	贺波洛乡	Hèbōluò Xiāng	ꉙꁈꇉꑣ	hxop po lo xie	513432202
Luji Township	鲁基乡	Lǔjī Xiāng	ꇇꐯꑣ	lot jjy xie	513432203
Lizi Township	李子乡	Lǐzǐ Xiāng	ꅾꊪꑣ	nix zy xie	513432204
Beishan Township	北山乡	Běishān Xiāng	ꀙꎭꑣ	bip sha xie	513432205
Qietuo Township	且拖乡	Qiětuō Xiāng	ꐀꄧꑣ	qiet tuo xie	513432208
Shamalada Township	沙马拉达乡	Shāmǎlādá Xiāng	ꎭꂵꇁꄿꑣ	sha mat la dda xie	513432210

== Population ==
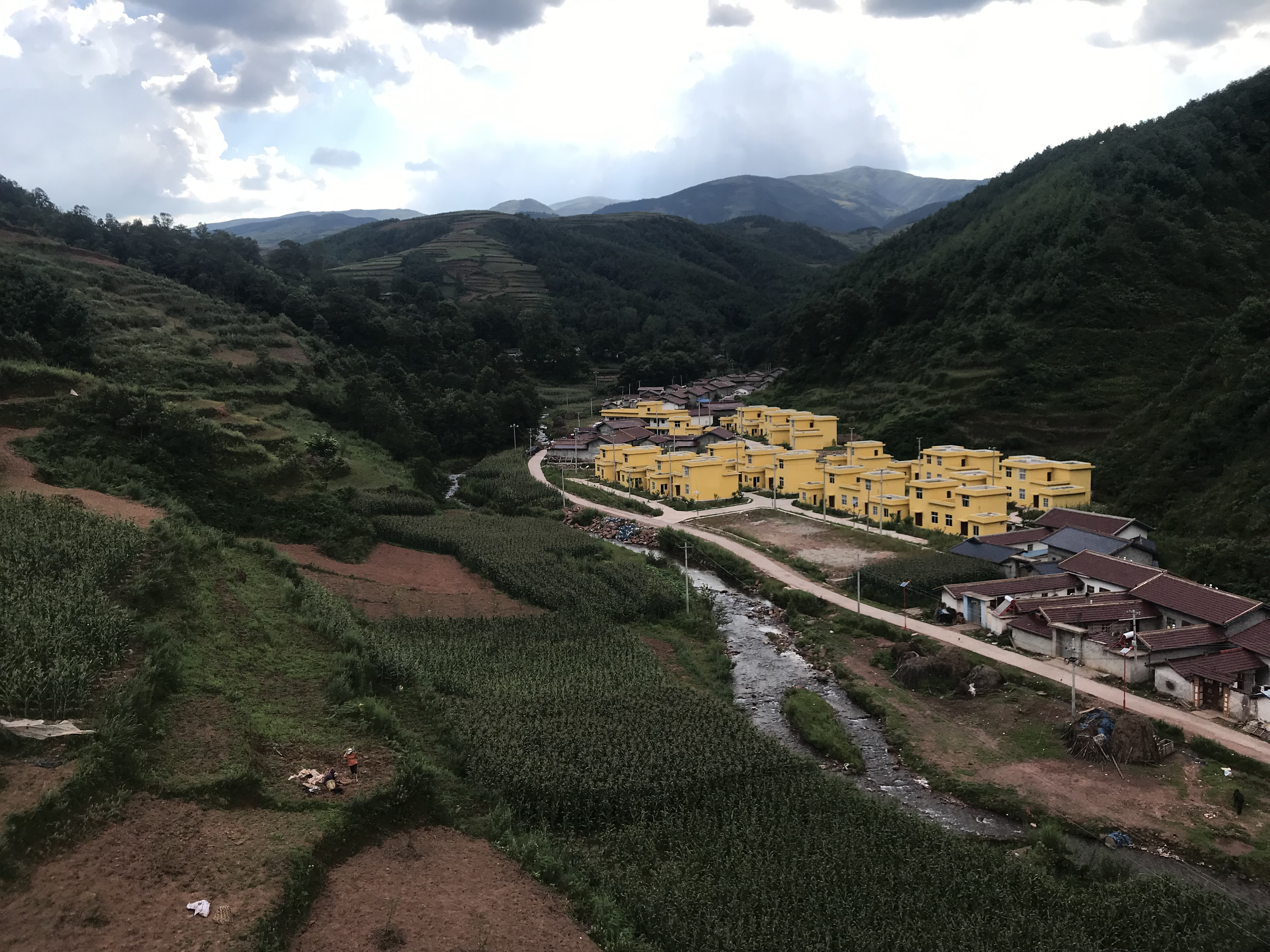

In 2018, the birth rate of Xide County was 15.26‰, the death rate was 4.57‰, and the natural population growth rate was 10.69‰. At the time of the seventh national census in 2020, the resident population of Xide County was 158,139. Among them, men accounted for 50.58%, women accounted for 49.42, and the sex ratio was 102.35. 0–14 years old accounted for 33.62%, 15–59 years old accounted for 56.96%, over 60 years old accounted for 9.42%, of which over 65 years old accounted for 7.25%.

There are mainly four ethnic groups in Xide County: Yi, Han, Hui, and Tibetan. The majority of the population in Xide County is Yi, accounting for 91.49% of the total population in 2018. Agriculture is the mainstay, and animal husbandry is supplemented. Since the early Qing Dynasty, the number of Hui people who moved to Minzhu Village, Mianshan Town, increased from 78 people in 13 households in 1985 to 101 people in 2006; Xide Tibetan people moved in from Shigatse, Tibet, and stayed in Hong Kong. Xuejia Baozi, the second group of Sijin Village, Mozhen, has been through 9 generations, and in 2006 there were 17 households with 66 people.

== Economy ==
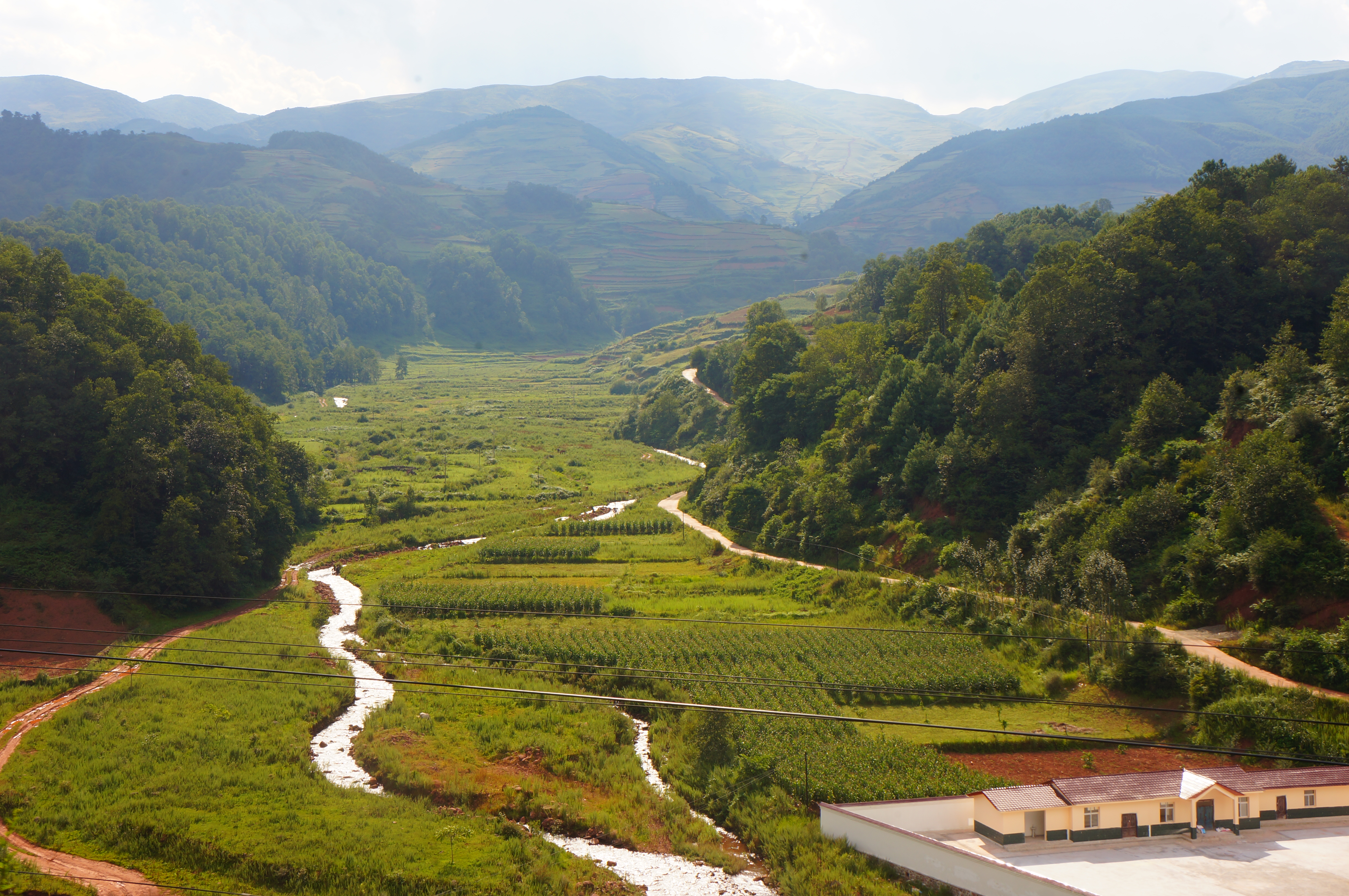

In 2018, the GDP of Xide County was 2,392.08 million yuan, of which the added value of the primary industry was 750.75 million yuan, the added value of the secondary industry was 668.39 million yuan, and the added value of the tertiary industry was 972.94 million yuan. The three industrial structures were 31.39 yuan: 27.94: 40.67. In 2018, the per capita GDP of residents in the county was 12,909 yuan, and the per capita disposable income was 12,579 yuan, including 24,270 yuan for urban residents and 8,703 yuan for rural residents.

In 2018, the agricultural added value of Xide County was 750.75 million yuan, the grain sown area was 20,415 hectares, and the total grain output was 83,215 tons; 140,664 pigs, 8,600 cattle, 143,609 sheep, and 14,769 tons of meat were produced; 98,182 cattle, 21,927 cattle and 155,047 sheep. The output of Sichuan pepper is 800 tons, the output of walnut is 1,553 tons, and the output of chestnut is 63 tons. [10]

In 2018, the industrial added value of Xide County was 335.14 million yuan, accounting for 14.0% of the regional GDP. There are 7 industrial enterprises above designated size, with a total industrial output value of 290 million yuan and an increase of 9.2% in industrial added value. The power consumption of industrial enterprises was 71.52 million kWh, the output of raw iron ore was 90,000 tons, the output of finished products was 48,000 tons, and the output of ferroalloy was 6,000 tons. The added value of the construction industry was 333.25 million yuan, accounting for 13.9% of the regional GDP.

In 2018, the total retail sales of social consumer goods in Xide County was 910.35 million yuan, the added value of the wholesale and retail industry was 137.96 million yuan, accounting for 5.8% of the regional GDP, and the added value of the accommodation and catering industry was 151.33 million yuan, accounting for 151.33 million yuan in the regional GDP. 6.3% of the value. The retail sales in the urban market was 534.49 million yuan, and the retail sales in the rural market was 358.18 million yuan. In the industry structure, the retail sales were 749.24 million yuan, the accommodation industry was 16.68 million yuan, and the catering industry retail sales were 126.75 million yuan.

== Transportation ==
In 2018, the mileage of rural roads in Xide County was 1,342.7 kilometers, including 61 kilometers of national roads, 113.4 kilometers of provincial roads, 166 kilometers of county and township roads, 825.3 kilometers of village roads, and 177 kilometers of special roads. There are 44 kilometers of highways above grade 3 and 109 kilometers of roads of grade 4. There is 1 road transport enterprise, 208 operating vehicles with a total of 2,037 vehicles, 17 rural passenger lines, 3 cross-line lines in Linxian County, and 50 taxis operating within the county. The annual passenger turnover was 56.54 million people/km, and the freight turnover was 169.48 million tons/km.

== Mineral resources ==
The total land area of Xide County is 220,651 hectares (545,240 acres), of which 26,122 hectares (64,550 acres) is cultivated land, most of which are dry land, and paddy fields are distributed in the valleys of ditch and dam. There are 683 hectares (1,690 acres) of garden land, accounting for 0.3% of the county area; 105,417 hectares (260,490 acres) of forest land, accounting for 47.7% of the county area; 73,979 hectares (182,810 acres) of pasture land, accounting for 33.5% of the county area; 1,769 hectares (4,370 acres) of residential and mining land, accounting for 0.8% of the county area; transportation land is 1,539 hectares (3,800 acres), accounting for 0.7% of the county area; water area is 6,437 hectares (15,910 acres), accounting for 2.9% of the county area; unused land is 4,705 hectares (11,630 acres), accounting for 2.1% of the county area.

There are various soil types in Xide County, including 2,213 hectares (5,470 acres) of paddy soil, 2,301 hectares (5,690 acres) of fluvo-aquic soil, 123,835 hectares (306,000 acres) of purple soil, 12,138 hectares (29,990 acres) of red loam, 27,460 hectares (67,900 acres) of yellow-brown loam, 17,106 hectares (42,270 acres) of dark brown loam, and mountain calcification. The soil is 1,710 hectares (4,200 acres), the mountain meadow soil is 24,393 hectares (60,280 acres), the subalpine meadow soil is 1,678 hectares (4,150 acres), and the limestone soil is 1,075 hectares (2,660 acres).

More than 40 mineral deposits have been found in Xide County, including iron, copper, lead, zinc, tin and other metal minerals; arsenic, fluorite, dolomite, silica, granite, feldspar, basalt, tuff, sandstone for construction, Non-metallic minerals such as shale for bricks and tiles; energy minerals such as coal and geothermal hot springs. Among them, dolomite, granite, marble, basalt, and sandstone for construction have reached the scale of medium-sized or above, and all of them are small-scale mines.

== Culture ==
The Wuhe Tomb in Xide County is listed as a national key cultural relic protection unit in China, and the Dengxiangying Ancient Post Station and Xide Deng Mansion are listed as Sichuan provincial key cultural relics protection units. Xide Yi Kezhi and Yi lacquer decoration skills were included in the second batch of China's national intangible cultural heritage list, and were awarded the title of "Hometown of Yi Lacquerware" by China's National Ethnic Affairs Commission and Liangshan Prefecture Government.

== Education ==
In 2018, there were 76 schools of all levels and types in Xide County, including 23 kindergartens, 10,952 students, 279 faculty members, and 163 full-time teachers; 46 primary schools, 28,493 students and 1,415 faculty members. There are 1,329 full-time teachers; 5 junior high schools, 8,512 students, 225 faculty members, and 222 full-time teachers; 3 nine-year schools with 2,484 students, 206 faculty members, and 285 full-time teachers; There are 2 complete middle schools with 2,667 students, 299 faculty members and 291 full-time teachers. Among the county's population, college education accounted for 4.572%, high school education accounted for 4.657%, junior high school education accounted for 19.534%, and primary school education accounted for 40.316%.
