= Liu Shaoxian =

Chinese politician (1940–2009)

- 刘绍先

Communist Party Secretary of Liangshan Yi Autonomous Prefecture
- In office January 1990 – February 1995

Governor of Liangshan Yi Autonomous Prefecture
- In office August 1983 – March 1991
- Preceded by: Wazhamuji
- Succeeded by: Ma Kaiming

Personal details
- Born: July 1940 Mianning County, Sichuan, China
- Died: 8 October 2009 (aged 69) Chengdu, Sichuan, China
- Party: Chinese Communist Party
- Education: Central University for Nationalities

Chinese name
- Simplified Chinese: 刘绍先
- Traditional Chinese: 劉紹先
Transcriptions
Standard Mandarin
- Hanyu Pinyin: Liú Shàoxiān

Liu Shaoxian (Chinese: 刘绍先; July 1940 – 8 October 2009) was a Chinese politician of Yi ethnicity who served as governor of Liangshan Yi Autonomous Prefecture from 1983 to 1991 and party secretary from 1990 to 1995. He was a delegate to the 7th National People's Congress. He was a member of the Standing Committee of the 10th Chinese People's Political Consultative Conference.

== Biography ==
Liu was born in Mianning County, Sichuan, in July 1940, and graduated from Central University for Nationalities in 1966. He joined the Chinese Communist Party (CCP) in November 1960, and entered the workforce in September 1966.

Liu worked in Muli Tibetan Autonomous County from May 1975 to April 1980. Starting in April 1980, he served in several posts in Yanyuan County, including deputy party secretary, party secretary, and chairman of its People's Congress. He was appointed deputy party secretary of Liangshan Yi Autonomous Prefecture in August 1983, concurrently holding the governor position. He also served as party secretary, the top political position in the prefecture, from January 1990 to February 1995. In February 1995, he became vice chairman of the Sichuan Provincial Committee of the Chinese People's Political Consultative Conference, a post he kept until 2006.

On 8 October 2009, he died in Chengdu, Sichuan, at the age of 69.

Government offices
Preceded by Wazhamuji	Governor of Liangshan Yi Autonomous Prefecture; 1983–1991	Succeeded by Ma Kaiming
Party political offices
Preceded by ?	Communist Party Secretary of Liangshan Yi Autonomous Prefecture; 1990–1995	Succeeded by ?
