= Huidong County, Sichuan =

Huidong County 会东县 · ꉼꄏꑤ
- County
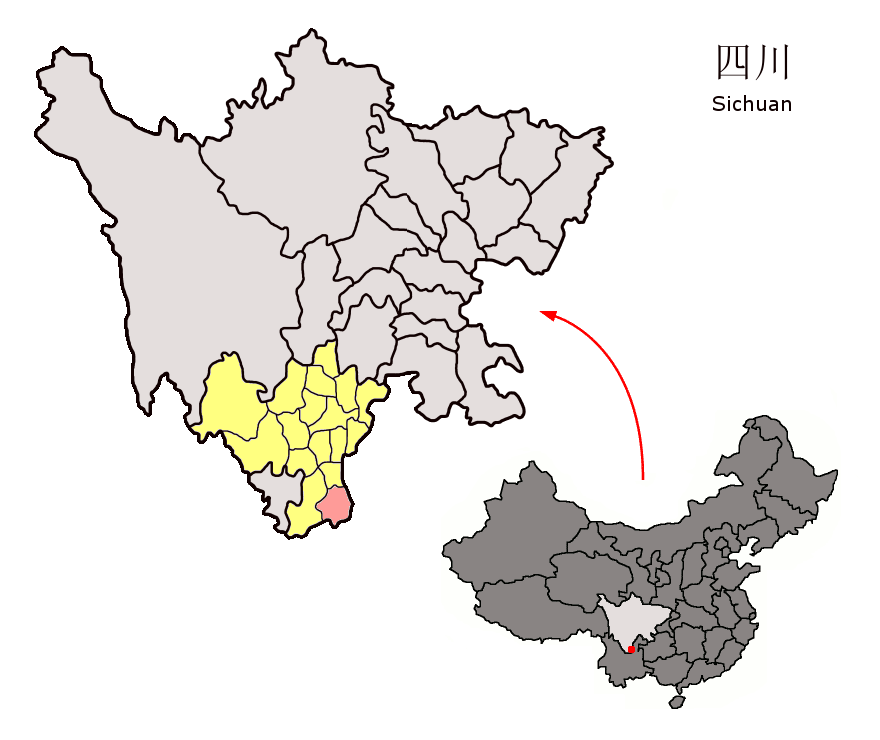
- Location of Huidong County (pink) and Liangshan Prefecture (yellow) within Sichuan

- Location of the seat in Sichuan Huidong (China)
- Coordinates: 26°38′04″N 102°34′41″E
- Country: China
- Province: Sichuan
- Autonomous prefecture: Liangshan
- County seat: Shenyuhe

Area
  - Total: 3,227 km^{2} (1,246 sq mi)

Population (2020)
  - Total: 346,082
  - Density: 107.2/km^{2} (277.8/sq mi)
- Time zone: UTC+8 (China Standard)
- Website: www.schd.gov.cn

Huidong County, Sichuan

Chinese name
- Simplified Chinese: 会东县
- Traditional Chinese: 會東縣
Transcriptions
Standard Mandarin
- Hanyu Pinyin: Huìdōng Xiàn

Yi name
- Yi: ꉼꄏꑤ; Romanisation: hop do xiep

Huidong County (Chinese: 会东县; Yi: ꉼꄏꑤ) is a county in the far south of Sichuan Province, China. It is under the administration of the Liangshan Yi Autonomous Prefecture.

== Geography ==
Huidong is located in southern Sichuan. It borders Huili to the west, Ningnan County to the north, and Qiaojia County, Dongchuan District and Luquan County, Yunnan across the Jinsha River to the south and east.

== Administrative divisions ==
Huidong County comprises 2 subdistricts, 13 towns, and 4 townships.

Name	Simplified Chinese	Hanyu Pinyin	Yi	Romanized Yi	Administrative division code
Subdistricts
Yucheng Subdistrict	鱼城街道	Yúchéng Jiēdào	ꒄꍰꏦꈜ	yup chep jie gga	513426001
Jinjiang Subdistrict	金江街道	Jīnjiāng Jiēdào	ꏢꏦꏦꈜ	ji jie jie gga	513426002
Towns
Shenyuhe Town	鲹鱼河镇	Shēnyúhé Zhèn	ꌜꒄꉼꍔ	se yup hop zhep	513426100
Qianxin Town	铅锌镇	Qiānxīn Zhèn	ꐂꑟꍔ	qie xi zhep	513426101
Duge Town	堵格镇	Dǔgé Zhèn	ꄖꇱꍔ	du gep zhep	513426102
Jiangzhou Town	姜州镇	Jiāngzhōu Zhèn	ꏦꍏꍔ	jie zho zhep	513426103
Wudongde Town	乌东德镇	Wūdōngdé Zhèn	ꃶꄏꄓꍔ	vu do dep zhep	513426104
Tangtang Town	淌塘镇	Tǎngtáng Zhèn	ꄣꄤꍔ	ta tap zhep	513426105
Tieliu Town	铁柳镇	Tiěliǔ Zhèn	ꄠꑖꍔ	tiep nyox zhep	513426106
Gaji Town	嘎吉镇	Gājí Zhèn	ꇤꏹꍔ	ga jyp zhep	513426107
Manyingou Town	满银沟镇	Mǎnyíngōu Zhèn	ꂶꑴꇬꍔ	max yip go zhep	513426108
Xinjie Town	新街镇	Xīnjiē Zhèn	ꏦꎫꍔ	jie shat zhep	513426109
Luji Town	鲁吉镇	Lǔjí Zhèn	ꇇꏹꍔ	lot jyp zhep	513426110
Dachong Town	大崇镇	Dàchóng Zhèn	ꄊꍬꍔ	dap chop zhep	513426111
Songping Town	松坪镇	Sōngpíng Zhèn	ꌙꀻꍔ	so pip zhep	513426112
Townships
Laojuntan Township	老君滩乡	Lǎojūntān Xiāng	ꇄꏮꄣꑣ	luox jo ta xie	513426202
Jiangxijie Township	江西街乡	Jiāngxījiē Xiāng	ꏦꑭꏦꑣ	jie xy jie xie	513426203
Liugu Township	溜姑乡	Liūgū Xiāng	ꑗꈬꑣ	nyo ggu xie	513426235
Yezu Township	野租乡	Yězū Xiāng	ꑸꊤꑣ	yiep zu xie	513426251

== Climate ==
Climate data for Huidong, elevation 1,695 m (5,561 ft), (1991–2020 normals, extremes 1981–present)
Month	Jan	Feb	Mar	Apr	May	Jun	Jul	Aug	Sep	Oct	Nov	Dec	Year
Record high °C (°F)	25.0 (77.0)	26.8 (80.2)	31.5 (88.7)	32.9 (91.2)	36.2 (97.2)	35.2 (95.4)	34.3 (93.7)	34.7 (94.5)	32.9 (91.2)	29.2 (84.6)	26.2 (79.2)	23.1 (73.6)	36.2 (97.2)
Mean daily maximum °C (°F)	17.6 (63.7)	20.0 (68.0)	23.7 (74.7)	26.6 (79.9)	28.1 (82.6)	28.1 (82.6)	27.4 (81.3)	27.6 (81.7)	25.3 (77.5)	22.8 (73.0)	20.2 (68.4)	17.4 (63.3)	23.7 (74.7)
Daily mean °C (°F)	8.4 (47.1)	11.5 (52.7)	15.6 (60.1)	18.8 (65.8)	21.0 (69.8)	22.0 (71.6)	21.7 (71.1)	21.2 (70.2)	19.2 (66.6)	16.2 (61.2)	11.6 (52.9)	8.2 (46.8)	16.3 (61.3)
Mean daily minimum °C (°F)	1.9 (35.4)	4.4 (39.9)	8.4 (47.1)	11.8 (53.2)	15.2 (59.4)	17.8 (64.0)	18.1 (64.6)	17.4 (63.3)	15.8 (60.4)	12.7 (54.9)	6.6 (43.9)	2.5 (36.5)	11.0 (51.9)
Record low °C (°F)	−3.5 (25.7)	−2.7 (27.1)	−2.2 (28.0)	1.8 (35.2)	5.8 (42.4)	10.8 (51.4)	11.0 (51.8)	10.2 (50.4)	6.5 (43.7)	3.3 (37.9)	−1.6 (29.1)	−5.9 (21.4)	−5.9 (21.4)
Average precipitation mm (inches)	14.8 (0.58)	9.5 (0.37)	15.8 (0.62)	24.9 (0.98)	77.7 (3.06)	232.9 (9.17)	251.3 (9.89)	184.5 (7.26)	156.1 (6.15)	90.5 (3.56)	23.7 (0.93)	5.1 (0.20)	1,086.8 (42.77)
Average precipitation days (≥ 0.1 mm)	3.4	3.0	5.1	7.4	10.8	17.2	20.0	17.0	15.9	12.6	4.7	2.5	119.6
Average snowy days	1.2	0.9	0.2	0	0	0	0	0	0	0	0.1	0.5	2.9
Average relative humidity (%)	60	50	45	48	55	71	78	78	80	79	74	70	66
Mean monthly sunshine hours	228.4	224.7	255.3	261.5	227.7	146.4	135.4	159.9	120.3	142.3	197.8	208.7	2,308.4
Percentage possible sunshine	69	70	68	68	55	36	32	40	33	40	61	64	53
Source: China Meteorological Administration August all time high
