= Atulie'er =

Atulie'er 阿土列尔村
- Village
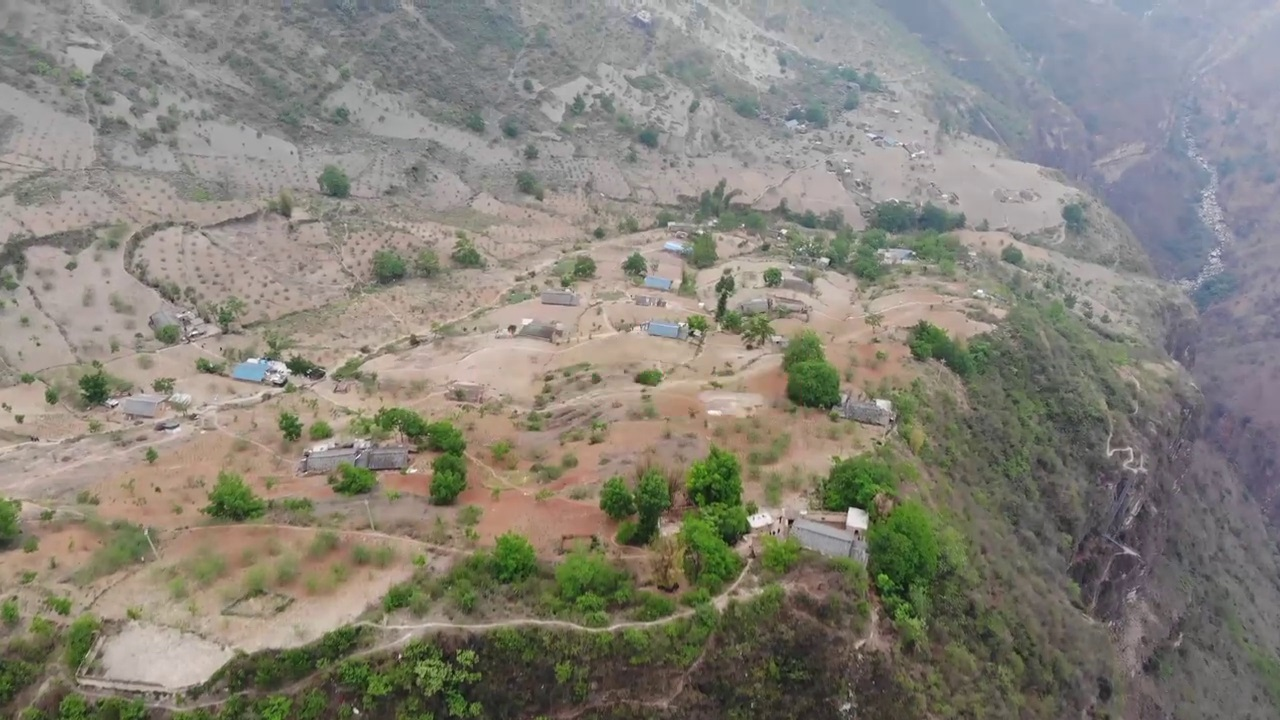
- Interactive map of Atulie'er
- Coordinates: 28.0541437°N 103.2727933°E
- Country: People's Republic of China
- Province: Sichuan
- Autonomous prefecture: Liangshan
- County: Zhaojue
- Township: Zhi'ermo Township

The Atulie'er village (Chinese: 阿土列尔村; pinyin: Ātǔliè ěr cūn), also transliterated as Atuleer, and Ado Ler, is located in the Zhi'ermo Township of Zhaojue County. The Atulie'er village was home to 72 families in 2016. As of 2025 there were only 4 or 5 families living there.

The village was the focus of a Chinese news video and photojournalism piece that became international news in May 2016. Due to the 200 year-old village's isolated location, perched like the seat of a chair with near-vertical cliffs both above and below, village children must use a series of handmade vine ladders to scale the 2,625 feet (800 m) cliff to reach a school in the river valley below. Parents supervise their children during the crossing due to the potential hazards. Students travel between their school and their residences every two weeks, and for the school period reside in dormitories on campus due to the ladder situation.

In 2015 Chen Jie of The Beijing News photographed the children on the ladder. The pictures went viral on the internet, prompting local authorities to announce that they would construct a staircase to serve the students. In 2020, the Chinese government began relocating the majority of Atulie'er's residents to the county seat of Zhaojue and converting the remaining village to a tourist site.
