= Huili =

Huili 会理市 · ꑌꄷꏃ
- County-level city
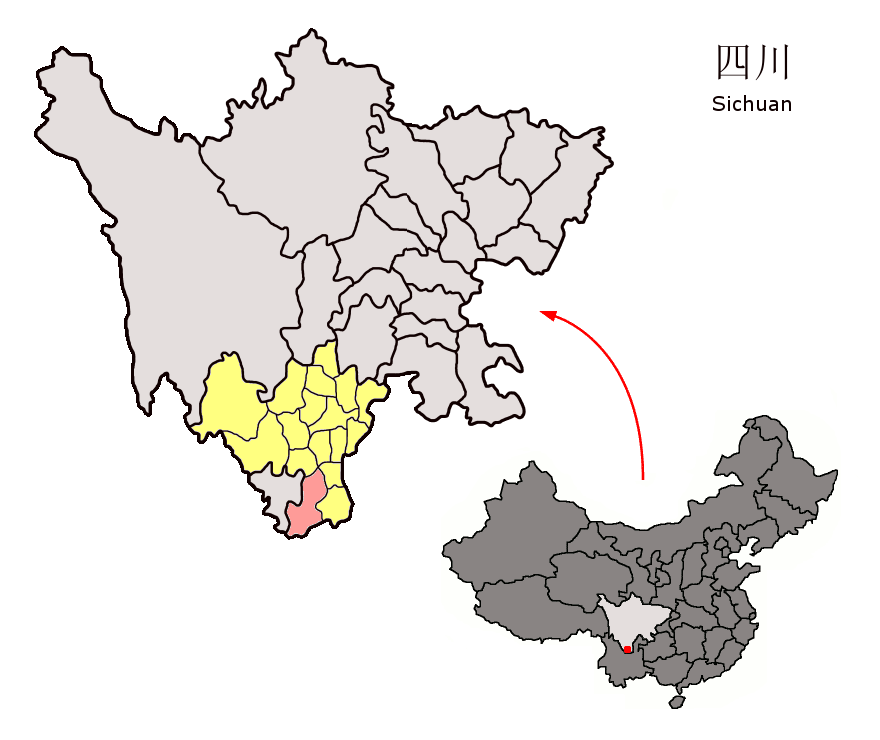
- Location of Huili County (pink) and Liangshan Prefecture (yellow) within Sichuan

- Location in Sichuan Huili (China)
- Coordinates: 26°38′N 102°15′E
- Country: China
- Province: Sichuan
- Autonomous prefecture: Liangshan
- Municipal seat: Gucheng Subdistrict

Area
  - Total: 4,527 km^{2} (1,748 sq mi)
- Elevation: 1,802 m (5,912 ft)

Population (2020)
  - Total: 390,531
  - Density: 86.27/km^{2} (223.4/sq mi)
- Time zone: UTC+8 (China Standard)
- Area code: 0834
- Website: www.huili.gov.cn

Huili

Chinese name
- Simplified Chinese: 会理市
- Traditional Chinese: 會理市
Transcriptions
Standard Mandarin
- Hanyu Pinyin: Huìlǐ Shì

Yi name
- Yi: ꑌꄷꏃ or ꉼꆹꏃ; Romanisation: nyi ddix shyp or hop li shyp

Huili (Chinese: 会理市; pinyin: Huìlǐ Shì; Yi: ꑌꄷꏃ or ꉼꆹꏃ nyi ddix shyp or hop li shyp) is a county-level city of far southern Sichuan province, China. It is under the administration of the Liangshan Yi Autonomous Prefecture.

Formerly Huili County (会理县, ꑌꄷꑤ), it was upgraded to a county-level city in May 2022.

== Administrative divisions ==
Huili comprises 7 subdistricts, 11 towns, 6 townships and 2 ethnic townships.

Name	Simplified Chinese	Hanyu Pinyin	Yi	Romanized Yi	Administrative division code
Subdistricts
Chengbei Subdistrict	城北街道	Chéngběi Jiēdào	ꍰꀙꏦꈜ	chep bip jie gga	513402001
Chengnan Subdistrict	城南街道	Chéngnán Jiēdào	ꀙꇨꏦꈜ	bip guo jie gga	513402002
Gucheng Subdistrict	古城街道	Gǔchéng Jiēdào	ꀊꆨꇓꈓꏦꈜ	a hlex lur kur jie gga	513402003
Towns
Luchang Town	鹿厂镇	Lùchǎng Zhèn	ꇑꍣꍔ	lup cha zhep	513402101
Lixi Town	黎溪镇	Líxī Zhèn	ꆀꑭꍔ	nip xy zhep	513402102
Tong'an Town	通安镇	Tōng'ān Zhèn	ꄫꉢꍔ	to nga zhep	513402103
Taiping Town	太平镇	Tàipíng Zhèn	ꄠꀻꍔ	tiep pip zhep	513402104
Yimen Town	益门镇	Yìmén Zhèn	ꒊꂿꍔ	yyp mo zhep	513402105
Lüshui Town	绿水镇	Lǜshuǐ Zhèn	ꇑꎴꍔ	lup sho zhep	513402106
Yundian Town	云甸镇	Yúndiàn Zhèn	ꑴꄆꍔ	yip diep zhep	513402107
Xinfa Town	新发镇	Xīnfā Zhèn	ꑭꃔꍔ	xy fap zhep	513402108
Guanhe Town	关河镇	Guānhé Zhèn	ꇨꉼꍔ	guo hop zhep	513402109
Zhangguan Town	彰冠镇	Zhāngguàn Zhèn	ꍈꇨꍔ	zha guo zhep	513402110
Mugu Town	木古镇	Mùgǔ Zhèn	ꃆꇴꍔ	mup gu zhep	513402111
Liuhua Town	六华镇	Liùhuá Zhèn	ꇑꉸꍔ	lup huop zhep	513402112
Xiaoheiqing Town	小黑箐镇	Xiǎohēiqìng Zhèn	ꑦꉿꏿꍔ	xuo hep qip zhep	513402113
Townships
Neidong Township	内东乡	Nèidōng Xiāng	ꇊꄏꑣ	lop do xie	513402201
Shubao Township	树堡乡	Shùbǎo Xiāng	ꎽꀦꑣ	shup box xie	513402202
Caoyuan Township	槽元乡	Cáoyuán Xiāng	ꊼꑼꑣ	cuop yuop xie	513402204
Ethnic township
Xin'an Dai Ethnic Township	新安傣族乡	Xīn'ān Dǎizú Xiāng	ꑭꉢꄅꊥꑣ	xy nga die zup xie	513402203

== Geography and climate ==
Huili is situated in southern Sichuan and is the southernmost division of the Liangshan Prefecture, bordering Sichuan's Panzhihua City and Yunnan. The county-level city seat has an elevation of about 1,800 m (5,900 ft), although elevations range from 839 m (2,753 ft) along the Jinsha River to 3,920 m (12,860 ft) at Mount Beimu (贝母山). Huili was severely affected by the 2008 Panzhihua earthquake.

Due to its southerly location in Sichuan and high elevation, Huili has a subtropical highland climate (Köppen Cwb), with mild, very sunny and dry winters, and very warm, rainy summers. The monthly 24-hour average temperature ranges from 7.3 °C (45.1 °F) in January to 21.1 °C (70.0 °F) in June, and the annual mean is 15.23 °C (59.4 °F). Over 60% of the 1,162 mm (45.7 in) annual precipitation occurs from June to August. With monthly percent possible sunshine ranging from 34% in July to 72% in February, the county-level city seat receives 2,348 hours of bright sunshine annually.

Climate data for Huili, elevation 1,787 m (5,863 ft), (1991–2020 normals, extremes 1952–present)
Month	Jan	Feb	Mar	Apr	May	Jun	Jul	Aug	Sep	Oct	Nov	Dec	Year
Record high °C (°F)	24.5 (76.1)	27.1 (80.8)	30.1 (86.2)	32.6 (90.7)	35.2 (95.4)	35.2 (95.4)	35.1 (95.2)	33.4 (92.1)	31.2 (88.2)	29.5 (85.1)	26.9 (80.4)	22.9 (73.2)	35.2 (95.4)
Mean daily maximum °C (°F)	16.4 (61.5)	18.9 (66.0)	22.3 (72.1)	25.1 (77.2)	26.6 (79.9)	26.7 (80.1)	26.1 (79.0)	26.3 (79.3)	24.4 (75.9)	22.0 (71.6)	19.1 (66.4)	16.2 (61.2)	22.5 (72.5)
Daily mean °C (°F)	7.6 (45.7)	10.2 (50.4)	13.9 (57.0)	17.2 (63.0)	20.2 (68.4)	21.5 (70.7)	21.0 (69.8)	20.7 (69.3)	18.9 (66.0)	16.2 (61.2)	11.6 (52.9)	8.0 (46.4)	15.6 (60.1)
Mean daily minimum °C (°F)	1.1 (34.0)	3.0 (37.4)	6.5 (43.7)	10.1 (50.2)	14.5 (58.1)	17.6 (63.7)	17.8 (64.0)	17.1 (62.8)	15.7 (60.3)	12.6 (54.7)	6.5 (43.7)	2.2 (36.0)	10.4 (50.7)
Record low °C (°F)	−5.8 (21.6)	−3.9 (25.0)	−3.6 (25.5)	0.8 (33.4)	4.9 (40.8)	9.4 (48.9)	11.9 (53.4)	9.5 (49.1)	6.7 (44.1)	1.7 (35.1)	−2.0 (28.4)	−5.7 (21.7)	−5.8 (21.6)
Average precipitation mm (inches)	11.2 (0.44)	7.6 (0.30)	13.7 (0.54)	23.8 (0.94)	83.5 (3.29)	201.7 (7.94)	277.2 (10.91)	215.4 (8.48)	191.8 (7.55)	89.4 (3.52)	20.7 (0.81)	4.4 (0.17)	1,140.4 (44.89)
Average precipitation days (≥ 0.1 mm)	2.3	3.0	4.6	6.3	11.8	17.7	20.5	18.7	18.1	12.3	5.6	2.5	123.4
Average relative humidity (%)	63	56	51	53	59	72	80	79	80	77	73	70	68
Mean monthly sunshine hours	233.4	226.5	256.7	252.5	231.9	157.0	143.6	170.3	127.4	152.1	186.4	210.1	2,347.9
Percentage possible sunshine	71	72	69	66	56	38	34	42	35	43	57	65	53
Source: China Meteorological Administration All-time October high
