= Zhaojue County =

Zhaojue County 昭觉县 · ꏪꐦꑤ
- County
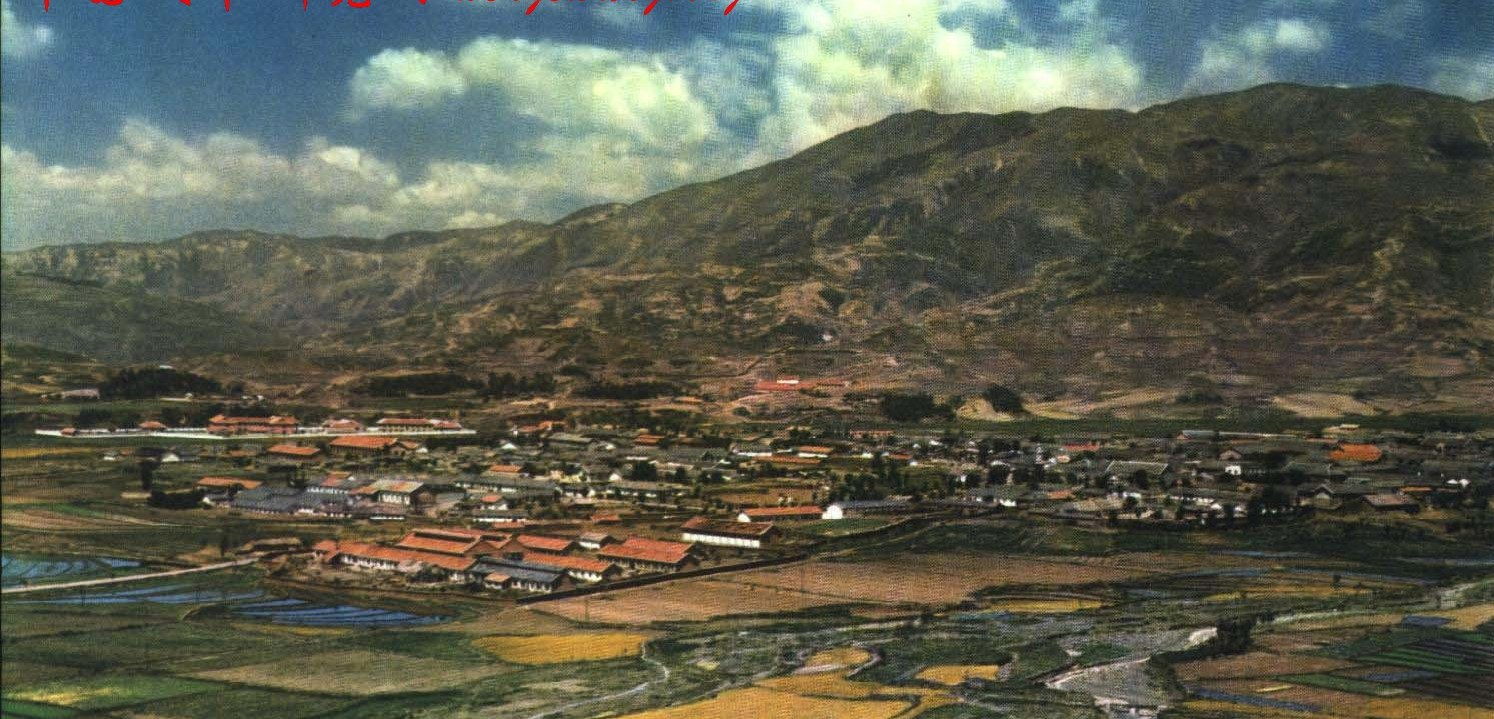
- Zhaojue County in 1964

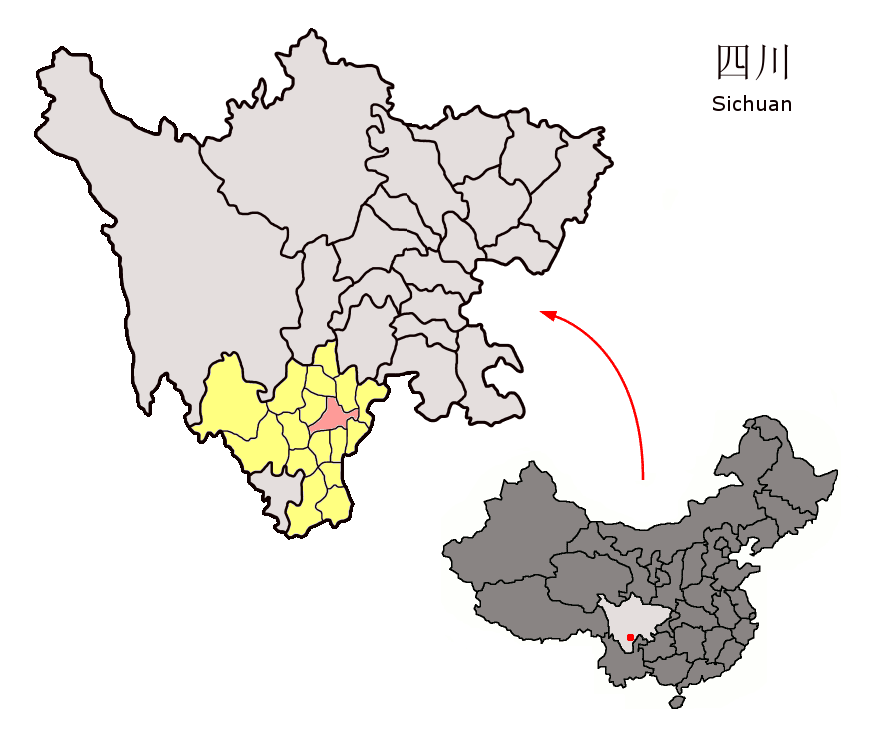
- Location of Zhaojue County (red) within Liangshan Prefecture (yellow) and Sichuan

- Location of the seat in Sichuan Zhaojue (China)
- Coordinates: 28°00′50″N 102°50′35″E
- Country: China
- Province: Sichuan
- Autonomous prefecture: Liangshan
- County seat: Xincheng

Area
  - Total: 2,699 km^{2} (1,042 sq mi)
- Highest elevation: 3,878 m (12,723 ft)
- Lowest elevation: 520 m (1,710 ft)

Population (2020)
  - Total: 252,435
  - Density: 93.53/km^{2} (242.2/sq mi)
- Time zone: UTC+8 (China Standard)
- Website: www.zhaojue.gov.cn

Zhaojue County

Chinese name
- Simplified Chinese: 昭觉县
- Traditional Chinese: 昭覺縣
Transcriptions
Standard Mandarin
- Hanyu Pinyin: Zhāojué Xiàn

Yi name
- Yi: ꏪꐦꑤ; Romanisation: juo jjop xiep

Zhaojue County (Chinese: 昭觉县, Yi: ꏪꐦꑤ) is a county in the south of Sichuan Province, China. It is under the administration of the Liangshan Yi Autonomous Prefecture. It has a population of 322,600 as of 2021, including 98.53% Yi. The name Zhaojue is a transliteration in Chinese of the Yi words for 'mountain eagle's plain', or 'sloped plain'.

== Administrative divisions ==
Zhaojue County comprises 11 towns and 9 townships.

Name	Simplified Chinese	Hanyu Pinyin	Yi	Romanized Yi	Administrative division code
Towns
Xincheng Town	新城镇	Xīnchéng Zhèn	ꑝꍰꍔ	xit chep zhep	513431100
Chengbei Town	城北镇	Chéngběi Zhèn	ꍰꀙꍔ	chep bip zhep	513431101
Zhuhe Town	竹核镇	Zhúhé Zhèn	ꍘꉈꍔ	zhup hxi zhep	513431102
Guqu Town	谷曲镇	Gǔqū Zhèn	ꈭꐎꍔ	ggup qu zhep	513431103
Bi'er Town	比尔镇	Bǐ'ěr Zhèn	ꀘꆳꍔ	bi hly zhep	513431104
Jiefanggou Town	解放沟镇	Jiěfànggōu Zhèn			513431105
Sanchahe Town	三岔河镇	Sānchàhé Zhèn	ꌒꍣꉼꍔ	sa cha hop zhep	513431106
Sikai Town	四开镇	Sìkāi Zhèn	ꌩꇽꍔ	syr kie zhep	513431107
Dimo Town	地莫镇	Dìmó Zhèn	ꅔꃀꍔ	ndip mop zhep	513431108
Guli Town	古里镇	Gǔlǐ Zhèn			513431109
E'er Town	俄尔镇	É'ěr Zhèn	ꈷꇓꍔ	mguo lur zhep	513431110
Townships
Meigan Township	美甘乡	Měigān Xiāng	ꂮꈜꑣ	mit gga xie	513431205
Boluo Township	博洛乡	Bóluò Xiāng	ꁨꆌꑣ	bbop no xie	513431210
Tebuluo Township	特布洛乡	Tèbùluò Xiāng	ꄮꁮꇉꑣ	te bbu lo xie	513431227
Qingheng Township	庆恒乡	Qìnghéng Xiāng	ꏿꊌꑣ	qip wep xie	513431228
Buyue Township	补约乡	Bǔyuē Xiāng	ꁮꒀꑣ	bbu yop xie	513431231
Jinqu Township	金曲乡	Jīnqǔ Xiāng	ꏢꐎꑣ	ji qu xie	513431234
Zepu Township	则普乡	Zépǔ Xiāng	ꋯꁌꑣ	nzi pu xie	513431238
Riha Township	日哈乡	Rìhā Xiāng	ꏝꊂꑣ	ryp wa xie	513431244
Hagan Township	哈甘乡	Hāgān Xiāng	ꉐꈜꑣ	hxa gga xie	513431245

== Atulie'er Village ==
The remote Atulie'er village (Atulie'ercun, 阿土列尔村), is located in the Zhi'ermo Township (支尔莫乡) of Zhaojue County. The village was the focus of a Chinese news video and photojournalism that became international news in May 2016. Villages such as Atuli'er are often dubbed cliff villages due to their height and remoteness.

== Climate ==
Climate data for Zhaojue, elevation 2,132 m (6,995 ft), (1991–2020 normals, extremes 1981–present)
Month	Jan	Feb	Mar	Apr	May	Jun	Jul	Aug	Sep	Oct	Nov	Dec	Year
Record high °C (°F)	23.9 (75.0)	25.6 (78.1)	30.8 (87.4)	31.0 (87.8)	33.0 (91.4)	33.1 (91.6)	31.3 (88.3)	32.5 (90.5)	31.6 (88.9)	28.4 (83.1)	25.5 (77.9)	21.5 (70.7)	33.1 (91.6)
Mean daily maximum °C (°F)	9.0 (48.2)	12.5 (54.5)	17.0 (62.6)	20.4 (68.7)	22.1 (71.8)	22.7 (72.9)	24.8 (76.6)	24.9 (76.8)	21.5 (70.7)	16.8 (62.2)	14.6 (58.3)	9.9 (49.8)	18.0 (64.4)
Daily mean °C (°F)	1.7 (35.1)	4.6 (40.3)	8.5 (47.3)	12.6 (54.7)	15.3 (59.5)	17.4 (63.3)	19.2 (66.6)	18.8 (65.8)	15.9 (60.6)	11.6 (52.9)	7.8 (46.0)	3.2 (37.8)	11.4 (52.5)
Mean daily minimum °C (°F)	−2.1 (28.2)	−0.2 (31.6)	3.2 (37.8)	7.4 (45.3)	10.9 (51.6)	14.0 (57.2)	15.6 (60.1)	15.0 (59.0)	12.6 (54.7)	8.8 (47.8)	4.1 (39.4)	−0.3 (31.5)	7.4 (45.4)
Record low °C (°F)	−11.3 (11.7)	−10.2 (13.6)	−7.4 (18.7)	−2.3 (27.9)	−0.1 (31.8)	7.8 (46.0)	8.6 (47.5)	7.4 (45.3)	3.2 (37.8)	−0.4 (31.3)	−5.6 (21.9)	−17.0 (1.4)	−17.0 (1.4)
Average precipitation mm (inches)	9.6 (0.38)	12.0 (0.47)	29.5 (1.16)	56.7 (2.23)	105.2 (4.14)	217.3 (8.56)	209.5 (8.25)	161.0 (6.34)	134.1 (5.28)	71.3 (2.81)	20.5 (0.81)	8.3 (0.33)	1,035 (40.76)
Average precipitation days (≥ 0.1 mm)	6.2	6.8	9.7	12.5	15.7	20.8	18.8	17.0	17.1	17.0	7.8	6.7	156.1
Average snowy days	7.0	6.2	3.5	0.3	0	0	0	0	0	0	1.8	4.9	23.7
Average relative humidity (%)	75	69	67	69	74	81	81	81	84	85	80	78	77
Mean monthly sunshine hours	150.0	162.7	205.7	206.0	184.8	126.2	151.3	168.5	125.8	112.0	150.2	140.4	1,883.6
Percentage possible sunshine	46	51	55	53	44	30	36	42	35	32	47	44	43
Source: China Meteorological Administrationall-time November record high
