= Butuo County =

Butuo County 布拖县 · ꀭꄮꑤ
- County
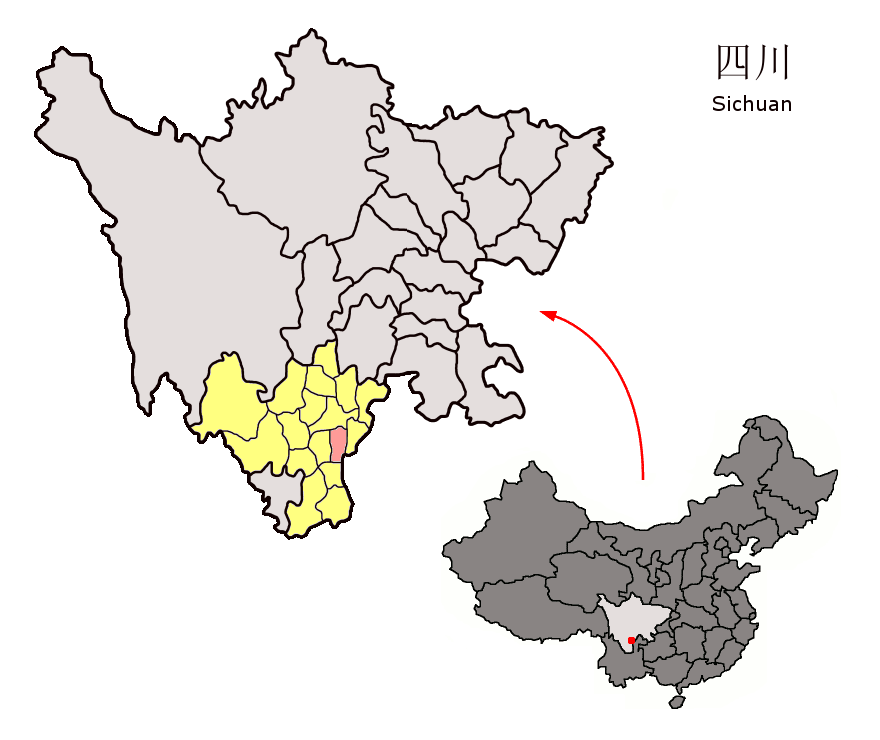
- Location of Butuo County (pink) and Liangshan Prefecture (yellow) within Sichuan

- Location in Sichuan Butuo (China)
- Coordinates: 27°36′N 102°52′E
- Country: China
- Province: Sichuan
- Autonomous prefecture: Liangshan
- County seat: Temuli

Area
  - Total: 1,685 km^{2} (651 sq mi)
- Elevation: 2,398 m (7,867 ft)
- Highest elevation: 3,891 m (12,766 ft)
- Lowest elevation: 535 m (1,755 ft)

Population (2020)
  - Total: 185,553
  - Density: 110.1/km^{2} (285.2/sq mi)
- Time zone: UTC+8 (China Standard)
- Website: www.bt.gov.cn

Butuo County

Chinese name
- Simplified Chinese: 布拖县
- Traditional Chinese: 布拖縣
Transcriptions
Standard Mandarin
- Hanyu Pinyin: Bùtuō Xiàn

Yi name
- Yi: ꀭꄮꑤ; Romanisation: bux te xiep

Butuo County (Chinese: 布拖县, Yi: ꀭꄮꑤ) is a county of southern Sichuan Province, China. It is under the administration of the Liangshan Yi Autonomous Prefecture. It was incorporated in 1952, and has continuously existed since 1960. The name 'Butuo' is based on the Yi language words for hedgehog and pine tree, giving it the name "a place with hedgehogs and pine trees". It is the unofficial capital of the Yi People and the birthplace of the Torch Festival. The county has a population of 215,800, 97.2% of whom are Yi People.

Butuo is considered very impoverished, traditional and still significantly influenced by the legacy of feudalism and slavery, which was only reformed in the 1950s. Most villagers make a living through animal husbandry. Almost all of the non-agrarian economy is concentrated in the county seat. It is a 'key county' for National Poverty Alleviation and Development work, with as of 2018, 122 poverty-stricken designated villages in the county, and 57,000 poor people.

The bamboo mouth harp (Kouxian) of Butou County was included as intangible cultural heritage of the Yi People.

== Administrative divisions ==
Butuo County administers 8 towns and 4 townships.

Name	Simplified Chinese	Hanyu Pinyin	Yi	Romanized Yi	Administrative division code
Towns
Temuli Town	特木里镇	Tèmùlǐ Zhèn	ꄮꃅꄸꍔ	te mu ddi zhep	513429100
Longtan Town	龙潭镇	Lóngtán Zhèn	ꇊꄤꍔ	lop tap zhep	513429101
Tuojue Town	拖觉镇	Tuōjué Zhèn	ꄮꐦꍔ	te jjop zhep	513429102
Jiudu Town	九都镇	Jiǔdū Zhèn	ꏮꅍꍔ	jo ddu zhep	513429103
Le'an Town	乐安镇	Lè'ān Zhèn	ꇅꉠꍔ	luo ngat zhep	513429104
Eliping Town	俄里坪镇	Élǐpíng Zhèn	ꀒꑌꀻꍔ	op nyi pip zhep	513429105
Diluo Town	地洛镇	Dìluò Zhèn	ꄹꇉꍔ	ddip lo zhep	513429106
Niujiaowan Town	牛角湾镇	Niújiǎowān Zhèn	ꑘꇬꃪꍔ	nyop go vat zhep	513429107
Townships
Bu'er Township	补尔乡	Bǔ'ěr Xiāng	ꀭꇐꑣ	bux lu xie	513429206
Laguo Township	拉果乡	Lāguǒ Xiāng	ꆿꈤꑣ	lat ggo xie	513429209
Weizhiluo Township	委只洛乡	Wěizhīluò Xiāng	ꃢꋝꇉꑣ	vit zzo lo xie	513429224
Jizhi Township	基只乡	Jīzhī Xiāng	ꏸꍝꑣ	jy zhy xie	513429226

== Climate ==
The altitude of Butuo County is about 2,460 m (8,070 ft), which makes it have a subtropical highland climate (Cwb).

Climate data for Butuo, elevation 2,460 m (8,070 ft), (1991–2020 normals, extremes 1981–2010)
Month	Jan	Feb	Mar	Apr	May	Jun	Jul	Aug	Sep	Oct	Nov	Dec	Year
Record high °C (°F)	21.3 (70.3)	24.1 (75.4)	26.5 (79.7)	28.8 (83.8)	29.9 (85.8)	29.7 (85.5)	28.9 (84.0)	28.5 (83.3)	29.5 (85.1)	25.9 (78.6)	22.3 (72.1)	21.7 (71.1)	29.9 (85.8)
Mean daily maximum °C (°F)	10.2 (50.4)	12.6 (54.7)	16.9 (62.4)	19.8 (67.6)	21.3 (70.3)	21.5 (70.7)	22.8 (73.0)	22.7 (72.9)	20.0 (68.0)	16.3 (61.3)	13.9 (57.0)	10.3 (50.5)	17.4 (63.2)
Daily mean °C (°F)	2.5 (36.5)	5.0 (41.0)	8.6 (47.5)	12.0 (53.6)	14.5 (58.1)	16.1 (61.0)	17.3 (63.1)	16.8 (62.2)	14.5 (58.1)	10.6 (51.1)	6.8 (44.2)	3.0 (37.4)	10.6 (51.2)
Mean daily minimum °C (°F)	−2.6 (27.3)	−0.4 (31.3)	2.7 (36.9)	6.2 (43.2)	9.4 (48.9)	12.4 (54.3)	13.4 (56.1)	12.8 (55.0)	10.8 (51.4)	7.2 (45.0)	2.2 (36.0)	−1.5 (29.3)	6.1 (42.9)
Record low °C (°F)	−17.4 (0.7)	−12.4 (9.7)	−9.3 (15.3)	−9.5 (14.9)	0.0 (32.0)	4.7 (40.5)	4.8 (40.6)	3.4 (38.1)	0.8 (33.4)	−2.3 (27.9)	−11.2 (11.8)	−25.4 (−13.7)	−25.4 (−13.7)
Average precipitation mm (inches)	15.9 (0.63)	17.2 (0.68)	31.4 (1.24)	59.3 (2.33)	115.4 (4.54)	234.0 (9.21)	205.8 (8.10)	156.5 (6.16)	154.9 (6.10)	97.2 (3.83)	27.1 (1.07)	13.6 (0.54)	1,128.3 (44.43)
Average precipitation days (≥ 0.1 mm)	7.6	7.6	10.6	12.4	15.7	20.9	20.2	19.1	18.1	18.5	10.9	9.6	171.2
Average snowy days	7.9	6.6	4.1	1.6	0.0	0.0	0.0	0.0	0.0	0.3	2.5	5.9	28.9
Average relative humidity (%)	67	61	60	64	71	81	82	81	83	84	77	74	74
Mean monthly sunshine hours	183.5	185.8	227.6	221.2	201.1	135.0	147.1	158.2	130.9	130.8	167.6	162.6	2,051.4
Percentage possible sunshine	56	58	61	57	48	32	35	39	36	37	52	51	47
Source: China Meteorological Administration
