= Ningnan County =

Ningnan County 宁南县 · ꆀꆆꑤ
- County
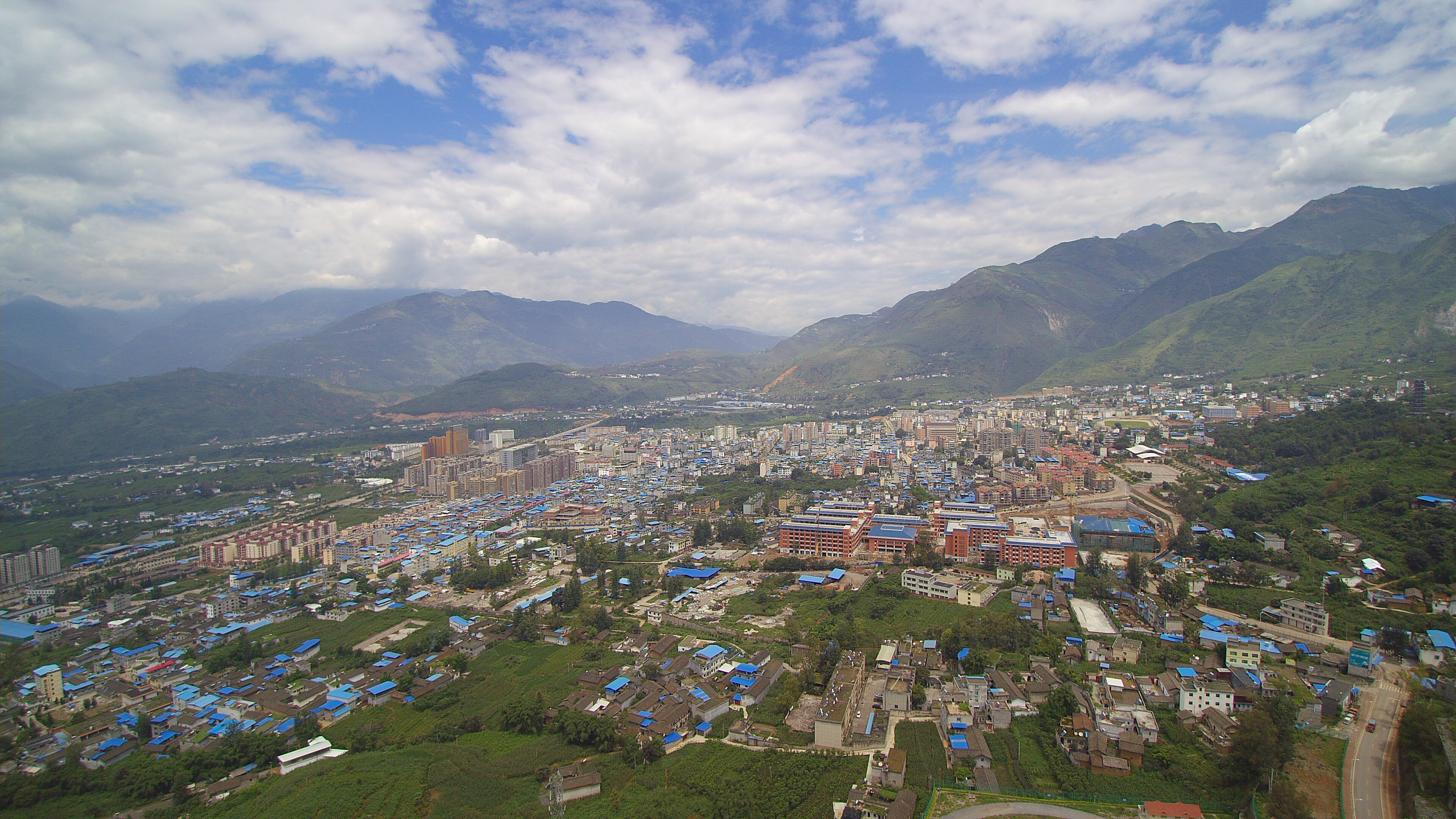

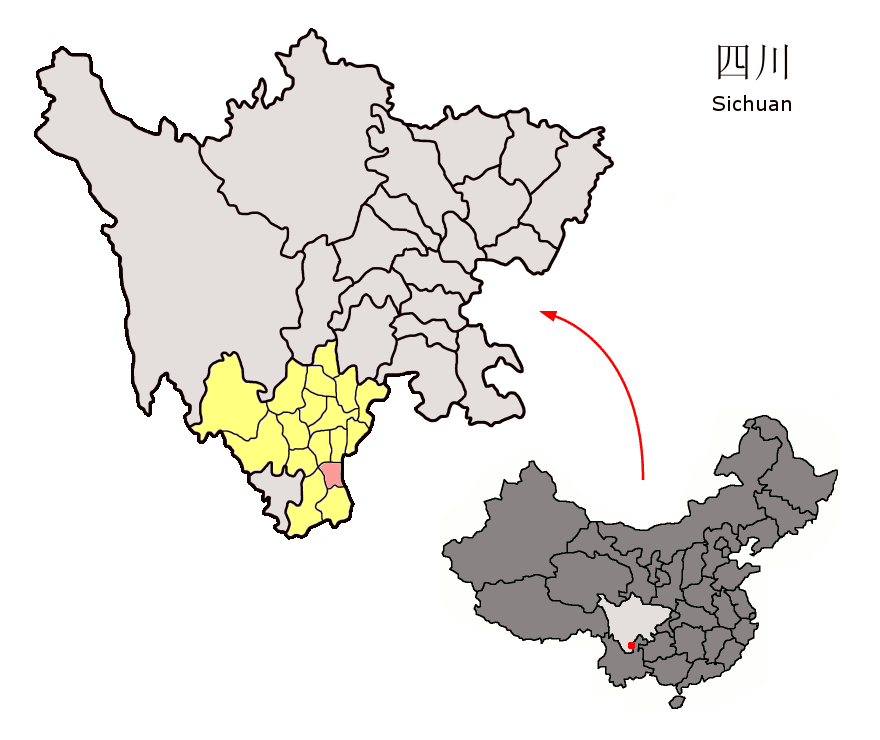
- Location of Ningnan County (red) within Liangshan Prefecture (yellow) and Sichuan

- Location in Sichuan Ningnan (China)
- Coordinates: 27°05′N 102°43′E
- Country: China
- Province: Sichuan
- Autonomous prefecture: Liangshan
- County seat: Ningyuan

Area
  - Total: 1,667 km^{2} (644 sq mi)

Population (2020)
  - Total: 184,293
  - Density: 110.6/km^{2} (286.3/sq mi)
- Time zone: UTC+8 (China Standard)
- Website: www.ningnan.gov.cn

Ningnan County

Chinese name
- Simplified Chinese: 宁南县
- Traditional Chinese: 寧南縣
Transcriptions
Standard Mandarin
- Hanyu Pinyin: Níngnán Xiàn

Yi name
- Yi: ꆀꇂꑤ or ꆀꆆꑤ; Romanisation: nip lap xiep or nip nap xiep

Ningnan County (Chinese: 宁南县, Yi: ꆀꇂꑤ) is a county in the south of Sichuan Province, China, bordering Yunnan province to the east. It is under the administration of the Liangshan Yi Autonomous Prefecture.

== Administrative divisions ==
Ningnan County comprises 13 towns.

Name	Simplified Chinese	Hanyu Pinyin	Yi	Romanized Yi	Administrative division code
Towns
Songxin Town	松新镇	Sōngxīn Zhèn	ꌗꑝꍔ	sot xit zhep	513427101
Zhushou Town	竹寿镇	Zhúshòu Zhèn	ꍘꎵꍔ	zhup shop zhep	513427102
Huadan Town	华弹镇	Huádàn Zhèn	ꉸꄤꍔ	huop tap zhep	513427103
Baihetan Town	白鹤滩镇	Báihètān Zhèn	ꀝꉿꄡꍔ	biep hep tat zhep	513427104
Xiyao Town	西瑶镇	Xīyáo Zhèn	ꑝꑼꍔ	xit yuop zhep	513427106
Datong Town	大同镇	Dàtóng Zhèn	ꄊꄬꍔ	dap top zhep	513427108
Qiluogou Town	骑骡沟镇	Qíluógōu Zhèn	ꐕꇆꇬꍔ	qyp luop go zhep	513427109
Paoma Town	跑马镇	Pǎomǎ Zhèn	ꁄꂷꍔ	puo ma zhep	513427110
Xingfu Town	幸福镇	Xìngfú Zhèn	ꑠꃛꍔ	xip fup zhep	513427111
Shili Town	石梨镇	Shílí Zhèn	ꏃꆀꍔ	shyp nip zhep	513427112
Liutie Town	六铁镇	Liùtiě Zhèn	ꇊꄝꍔ	lop tip zhep	513427113
Ningyuan Town	宁远镇	Níngyuǎn Zhèn	ꆀꑸꍔ	nip yiep zhep	513427116
Jule Town	俱乐镇	Jùlè Zhèn	ꏹꇆꍔ	jyp luop zhep	513427117

== Climate ==
Climate data for Ningnan, elevation 994 m (3,261 ft), (1991–2020 normals, extremes 1981–2010)
Month	Jan	Feb	Mar	Apr	May	Jun	Jul	Aug	Sep	Oct	Nov	Dec	Year
Record high °C (°F)	28.8 (83.8)	32.5 (90.5)	36.3 (97.3)	37.5 (99.5)	40.3 (104.5)	39.3 (102.7)	37.6 (99.7)	37.6 (99.7)	37.8 (100.0)	34.0 (93.2)	31.4 (88.5)	28.1 (82.6)	40.3 (104.5)
Mean daily maximum °C (°F)	18.0 (64.4)	21.6 (70.9)	26.4 (79.5)	29.8 (85.6)	30.7 (87.3)	29.8 (85.6)	30.1 (86.2)	30.3 (86.5)	27.1 (80.8)	23.6 (74.5)	21.8 (71.2)	17.8 (64.0)	25.6 (78.0)
Daily mean °C (°F)	10.9 (51.6)	14.4 (57.9)	18.8 (65.8)	22.4 (72.3)	24.1 (75.4)	24.2 (75.6)	24.7 (76.5)	24.5 (76.1)	21.9 (71.4)	18.4 (65.1)	15.2 (59.4)	11.2 (52.2)	19.2 (66.6)
Mean daily minimum °C (°F)	6.2 (43.2)	9.2 (48.6)	13.2 (55.8)	16.8 (62.2)	19.2 (66.6)	20.4 (68.7)	21.2 (70.2)	20.7 (69.3)	18.6 (65.5)	15.2 (59.4)	11.0 (51.8)	7.0 (44.6)	14.9 (58.8)
Record low °C (°F)	−0.8 (30.6)	−1.2 (29.8)	0.7 (33.3)	6.3 (43.3)	7.9 (46.2)	13.6 (56.5)	15.8 (60.4)	14.7 (58.5)	11.0 (51.8)	6.5 (43.7)	1.2 (34.2)	−0.6 (30.9)	−1.2 (29.8)
Average precipitation mm (inches)	13.0 (0.51)	12.7 (0.50)	18.7 (0.74)	27.3 (1.07)	81.1 (3.19)	223.8 (8.81)	196.1 (7.72)	153.5 (6.04)	167.3 (6.59)	103.2 (4.06)	20.0 (0.79)	5.9 (0.23)	1,022.6 (40.25)
Average precipitation days (≥ 0.1 mm)	3.7	3.9	4.9	7.0	11.7	18.2	17.2	15.8	15.8	13.3	5.2	2.9	119.6
Average snowy days	0.7	0.6	0	0	0	0	0	0	0	0	0	0.2	1.5
Average relative humidity (%)	58	49	44	46	57	75	79	77	80	80	70	65	65
Mean monthly sunshine hours	208.5	205.8	243.9	242.2	212.2	148.3	158.2	174.4	130.7	139.7	192.5	194.6	2,251
Percentage possible sunshine	63	65	65	63	51	36	38	43	36	40	60	60	52
Source: China Meteorological Administration
