= Liangshan Yi Autonomous Prefecture =

Liangshan Yi Autonomous Prefecture 涼山州
- Autonomous prefecture

Name transcription(s)
  - Chinese: 凉山彝族自治州 涼山彞族自治州 (Liángshān Yízú Zìzhìzhōu)
  - Yi: ꆃꎭꆈꌠꊨꏦꏱꅉꍏ (niep sha nuo su zyt jie jux dde zho)
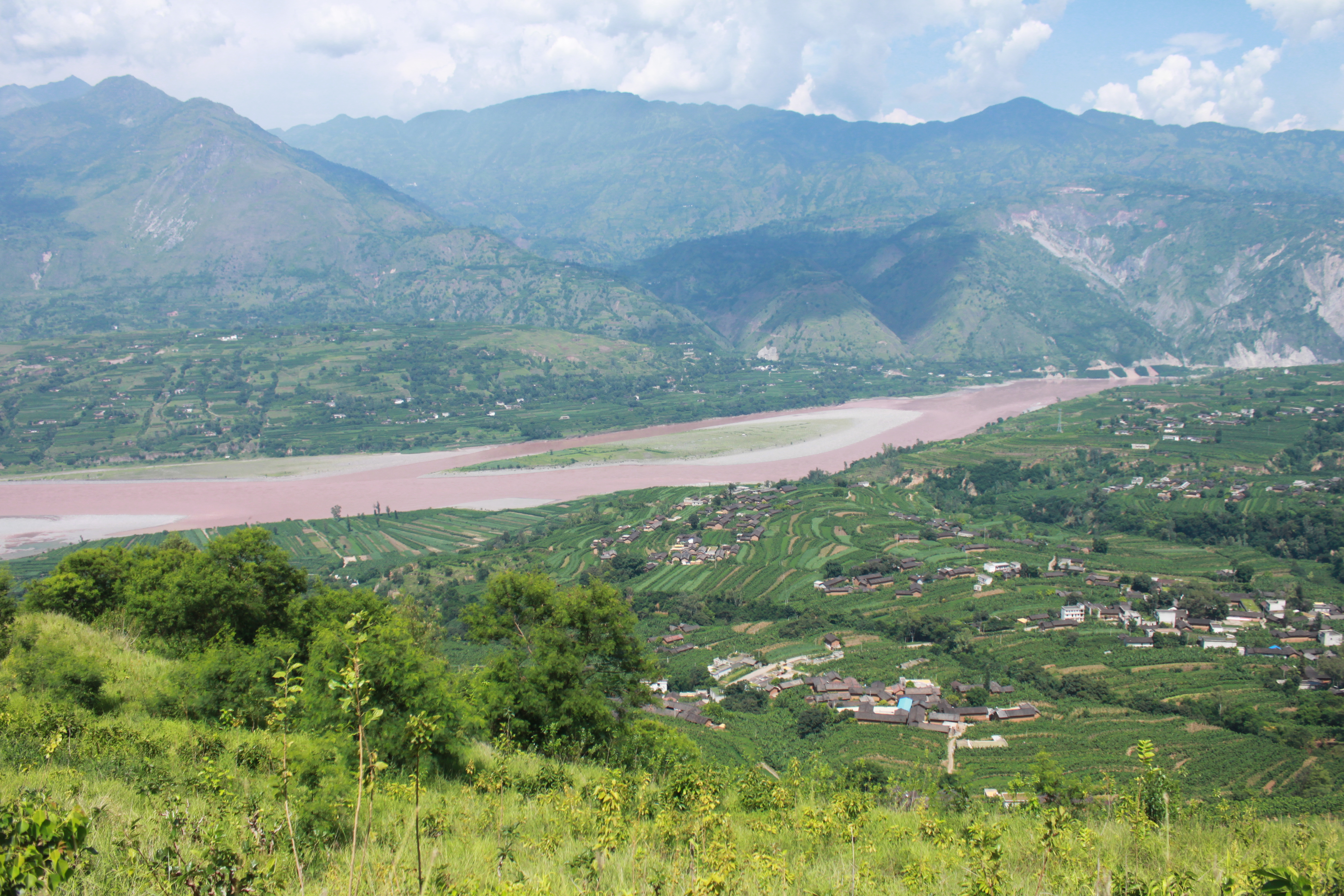
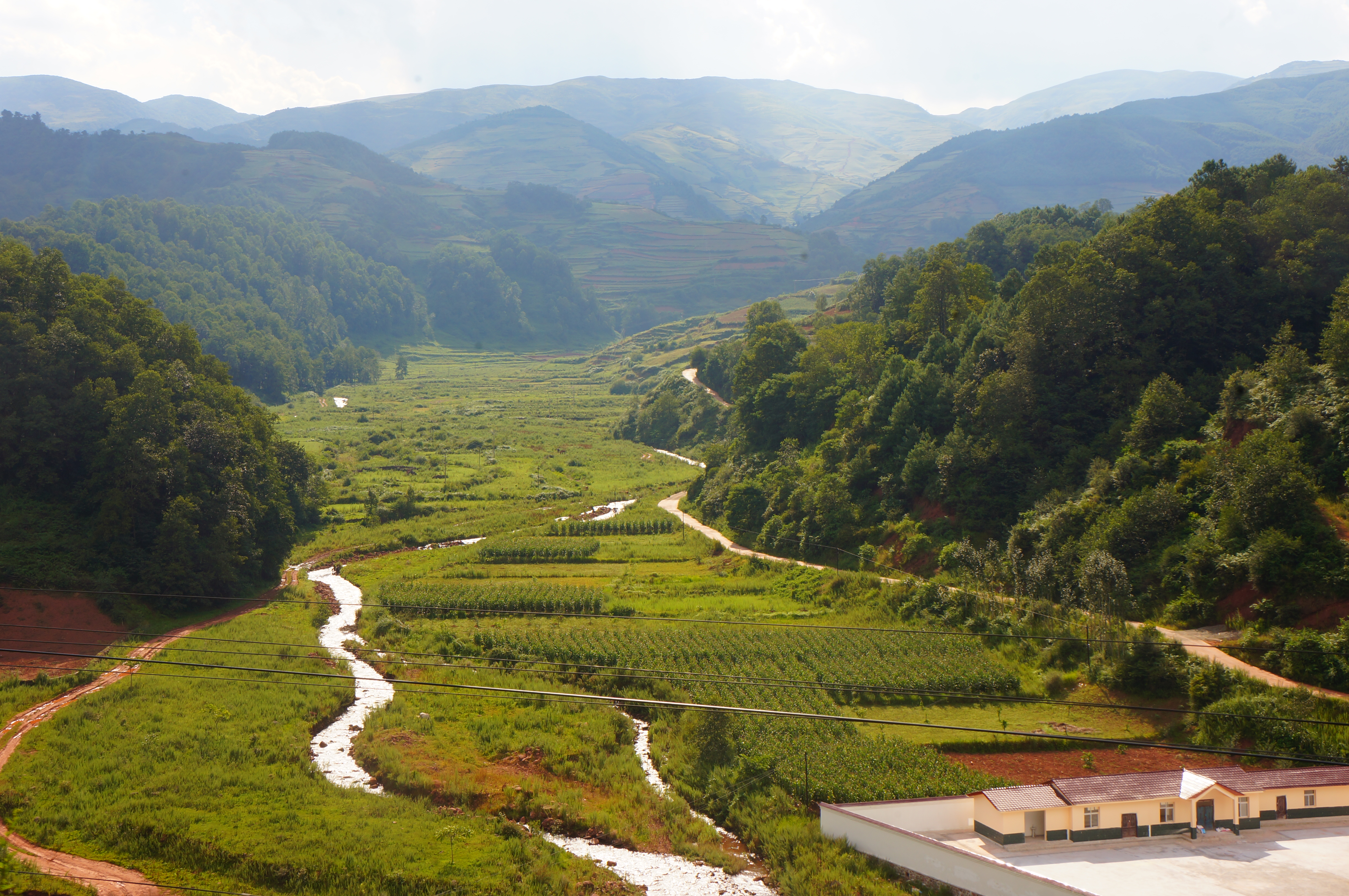
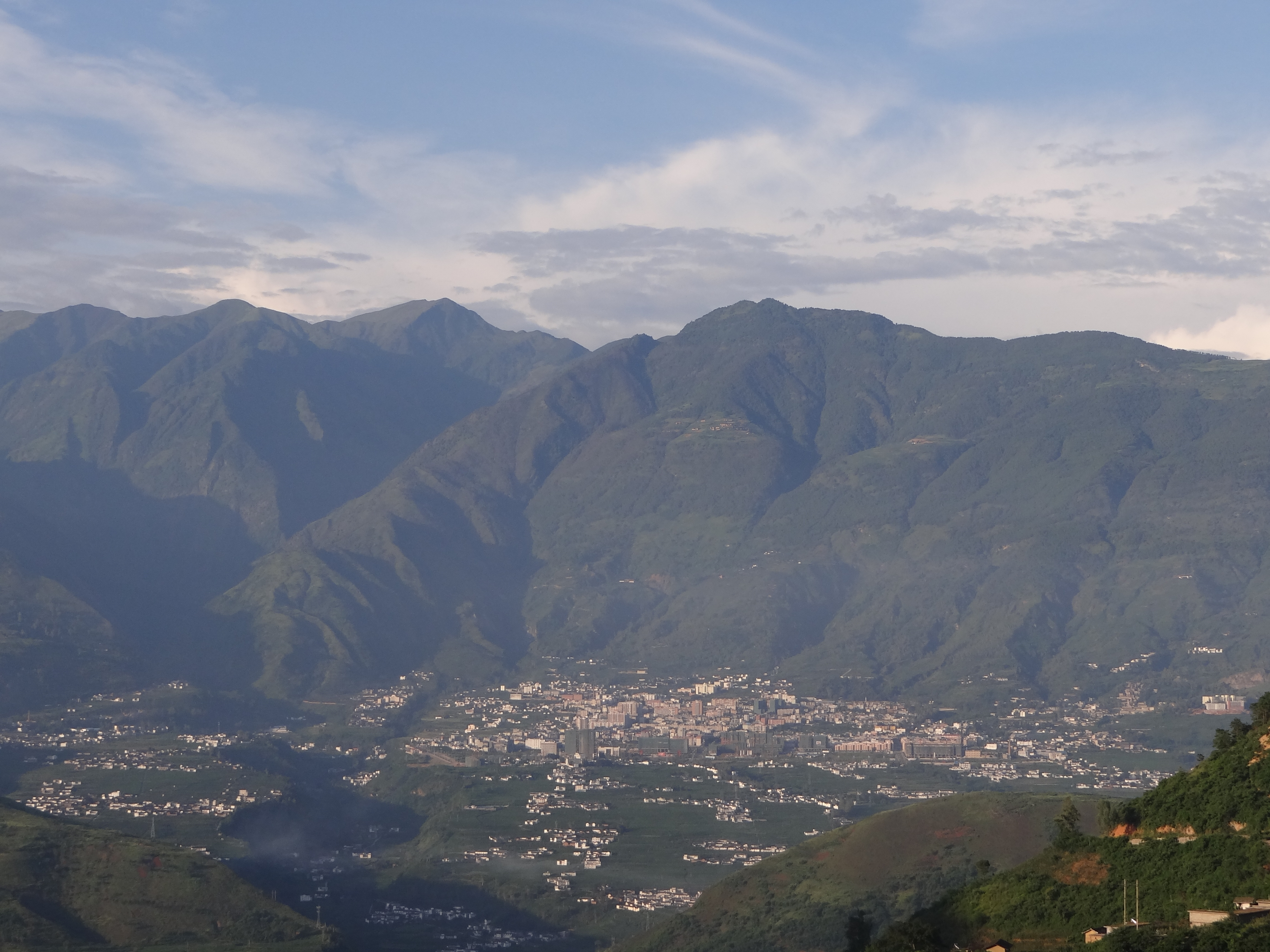
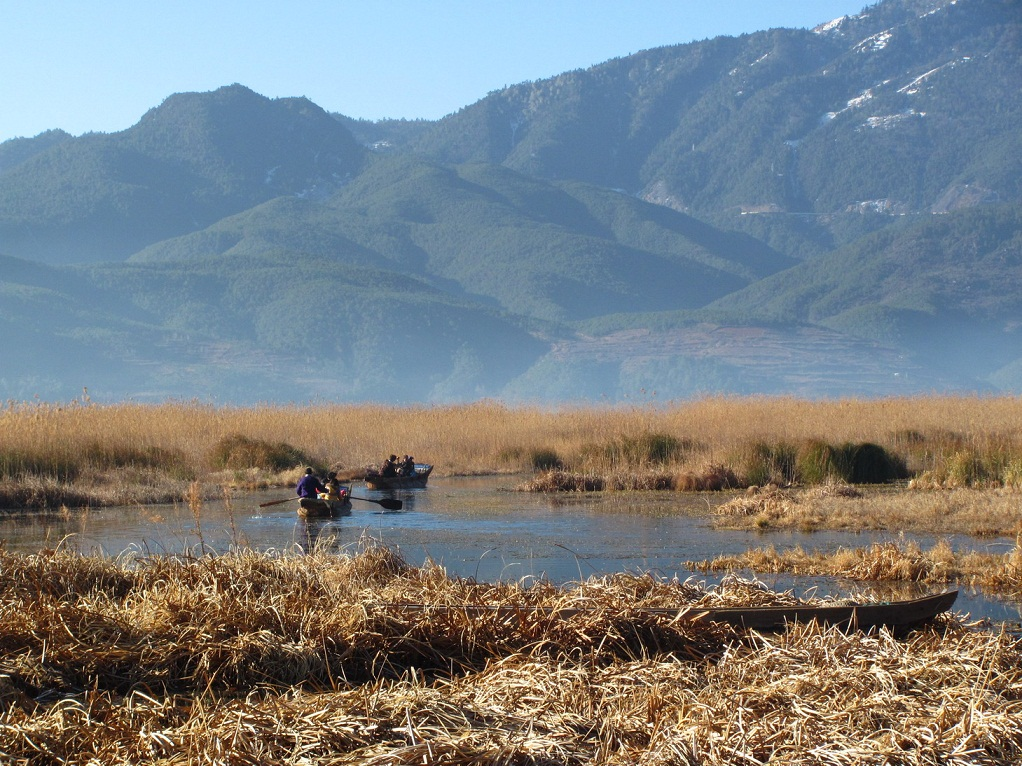
- Clockwise from top left: Huidong County, Xide County, Yanyuan County, Ningnan County

- Location of Liangshan Prefecture in Sichuan
- Coordinates (Liangshan Prefecture government): 27.88°N 102.27°E
- Country: People's Republic of China
- Province: Sichuan
- Prefecture seat: Xichang

Area
  - Total: 60,261 km^{2} (23,267 sq mi)

Population (2020)
  - Total: 4,858,359
  - Density: 80.622/km^{2} (208.81/sq mi)

GDP
  - Total: CN¥ 131.5 billion US$ 21.1 billion
  - Per capita: CN¥ 28,276; US$ 4,540
- Time zone: UTC+8 (China Standard)
- ISO 3166 code: CN-SC-34
- Website: www.lsz.gov.cn

Liangshan Yi Autonomous Prefecture

Chinese name
- Simplified Chinese: 凉山彝族自治州
- Traditional Chinese: 涼山彞族自治州
Transcriptions
Standard Mandarin
- Hanyu Pinyin: Liángshān Yízú Zìzhìzhōu

Abbreviation
- Simplified Chinese: 凉山州
- Traditional Chinese: 涼山州
Transcriptions
Standard Mandarin
- Hanyu Pinyin: Liángshān Zhōu

Yi name
- Yi: ꆃꎭꆈꌠꊨꏦꏱꅉꍏ niep sha nuo su zyt jie jux dde zho

Liangshan Yi Autonomous Prefecture (Note: simplified Chinese: 凉山彝族自治州; traditional Chinese: 涼山彞族自治州; pinyin: Liángshān Yízú Zìzhìzhōu; Yi: ꆃꎭꆈꌠꊨꏦꏱꅉꍏ, niep sha nuo su zyt jie jux dde zho) (Northern Yi: /nɛ˨˩ʂa˧/) is an autonomous prefecture occupying much of the southern extremity of Sichuan province, People's Republic of China. Its seat is Xichang. Liangshan covers an area of 60,261 km^{2} (23,267 sq mi) and has over 4.8 million inhabitants as of 2020. It has the largest population of ethnic Yi (or Nosu) among China's prefectures. Liangshan contains a number of isolated villages high up on its cliffs, often known as "cliff villages".

Xichang has the Xichang Qingshan Airport and the Xichang Satellite Launch Center. The prefecture also features a substantial network of railways for both passengers and freight.

== Governance ==
=== Liangshan Prefecture Public Security Bureau ===
The Liangshan Prefecture Public Security Bureau (Chinese: 凉山州公安局) is the primary law enforcement agency of Liangshan. It contains an economic crime investigation unit, a patrol unit, a narcotics unit an immigration unit, a cyber-crime unit, a traffic police unit, a SWAT unit and a forestry unit. As of 14 December 2023, 19 of the 30 people on the Liangshan Prefecture Public Security Bureau's most wanted list had been arrested.

In 2023, the Liangshan Prefecture PSB solved 4025 cases, the highest in all of Sichuan.

==== Line of duty deaths ====
Between 2004 and 2025, 30 officers of the Liangshan Prefecture PSB (including child agencies) have died in the line of duty, of which between 2013 and 2023 10 of which were from the narcotics unit (along with narcotics units of child agencies) or in narcotics related incidents.

=== Liangshan Prefecture Fire and Rescue Department ===
The Liangshan Prefecture Fire and Rescue Department (凉山州消防救援支队) is in charge of firefighting and disaster relief within the prefecture. In 2025, the agency had a budget of 37 million Renminbi and operated 56 firefighting vehicles. Prior to October 10, 2018 it was known as the China Fire Services Liangshan Fire Department (凉山州公安消防支队).

=== Liangshan Prefecture Forest Fire Department ===
The Liangshan Prefecture Forest Fire Department (凉山州森林消防支队) is a wildfire suppression agency of Liangshan. Prior to October 10, 2018 it was known as the People's Armed Police Forestry Corps Liangshan Detachment.

==== History ====
The Xichang Forest Fire Battalion of the Liangshan Forest Fire Department has put out a total of 200 wildfires since 2021.

==== Line of duty deaths ====
During the 2019 Muli wildfires, 27 firefighters of the Liangshan Prefecture Forest Fire Department died while putting out the fire.

=== People's Armed Police Liangshan Detachment ===
The People's Armed Police Liangshan Detachment (凉山武警支队) is in charge of paramilitary law enforcement and disaster relief duties. It contains a special operations unit for counter-terrorism operations.

==== History ====
On October 20, 2014, the People's Armed Police Liangshan Detachment's Meigu County rescued 4 people during a rockslide.

In 2015, the People's Armed Police Liangshan Detachment rescued 8 people during a traffic accident.

In 2017, the People's Armed Police Liangshan Detachment rescued 4 people during fires.

On April 2, 2020, the People's Armed Police Liangshan Detachment deployed 300 soldiers to assist in fighting wildfires.

The People's Armed Police Liangshan Detachment deployed 165 soldiers during the June 26, 2020 Mianning Floods to assist with disaster relief efforts.

==== Equipment ====
- QBZ-95 - Used by special operations unit
- QSZ-92 - Used by special operations unit
- Crossbow

== Terrain and climate ==
The Anning River, which runs into the Jinsha River (Yangtze River headwaters), is the main river in the area.

Owing to its low latitude and high elevation, Liangshan has a mild climate. Under the Köppen system, the prefecture belongs to the humid subtropical zone (Köppen Cwa). Winters feature mild days and cool nights, while summers are very warm and humid. Monthly daily mean temperatures range from 9.6 °C (49.3 °F) in January to 22.3 °C (72.1 °F) in July. Unlike much of the province, which lies in the Sichuan Basin, humidity levels in winter are rather low, but like the rest of the province, rainfall is concentrated in the months of June through September, and the prefecture is virtually rainless in winter.

=== Cliff villages ===
Due to the mountainous terrain, many villages that lie among the mountain cliffs of Liangshan Yi are isolated from the rest of Sichuan. They are called cliff villages as they tend to be isolated and lie at vertical heights of about 800 m (2,600 ft). Access to these cliff villages tends to be through vines of trees along the cliffs and steep ladders made of ropes. In 2016, the state run The Beijing News reported one such village called Atulie'er where children climbed up a rope ladder for two hours to reach their home from school, often leading to falls and deaths. In light of this, the local government constructed a special steel ladder (dubbed "Stairway to heaven") in November 2016 for people to climb up and down in a safer manner.

== Subdivisions ==
Liangshan directly controls two county-level cities, 14 counties, and 1 autonomous county.

Map
Name	Hanzi	Hanyu Pinyin	Yi	Yi Pinyin	Population (2010 Census)	Area (km^{2})	Density (/km^{2})
Xichang City	西昌市	Xīchāng Shì	ꀒꎂꏃ	Op Rro Shyp	712,434	2,655	268.33
Yanyuan County	盐源县	Yányuán Xiàn	ꋂꂿꑤ	Ce Mo Xiep	350,176	8,388	41.74
Dechang County	德昌县	Déchāng Xiàn	ꄓꍣꑤ	Dep Cha Xiep	214,405	2,284	93.87
Huili City	会理市	Huìlǐ Shì	ꑌꄷꏃ	Nyi Ddix Shyp	430,066	4,527	95.00
Huidong County	会东县	Huìdōng Xiàn	ꉼꄏꑤ	Hop Do Xiep	362,944	3,227	112.47
Ningnan County	宁南县	Níngnán Xiàn	ꆀꆆꑤ	Nip Nap Xiep	170,673	1,667	102.38
Puge County	普格县	Pǔgé Xiàn	ꁌꐭꑤ	Pu Jjyt Xiep	155,740	1,905	81.75
Butuo County	布拖县	Bùtuō Xiàn	ꀭꄮꑤ	Bux Te Xiep	160,151	1,685	95.04
Jinyang County	金阳县	Jīnyáng Xiàn	ꏁꇉꑤ	Shyx lo Xiep	165,121	1,587	104.04
Zhaojue County	昭觉县	Zhāojué Xiàn	ꏪꐦꑤ	Juo Jjop Xiep	251,836	2,699	93.30
Xide County	喜德县	Xǐdé Xiàn	ꑝꅇꑤ	Xit Ddop Xiep	165,906	2,206	75.20
Mianning County	冕宁县	Miǎnníng Xiàn	ꍿꆈꑤ	Rruo Nuo Xiep	351,245	4,423	79.41
Yuexi County	越西县	Yuèxī Xiàn	ꃺꄧꑤ	Vyt Tuo Xiep	269,896	2,257	119.58
Ganluo County	甘洛县	Gānluò Xiàn	ꇤꇉꑤ	Ga Lo Xiep	195,100	2,156	90.49
Meigu County	美姑县	Měigū Xiàn	ꂿꈬꑤ	Mo Ggu Xiep	221,505	2,573	86.08
Leibo County	雷波县	Léibō Xiàn	ꃀꁧꑤ	Mop Bbo Xiep	223,885	2,932	76.35
Muli Tibetan Autonomous County	木里藏族自治县	Mùlǐ Zàngzú; Zìzhìxiàn	ꃆꆹꀒꋤꊨꏦꏱꅉꑤ	Mup Li Op Zzup Zyt Jie Jux Dde Xiep	131,726	13,252	9.94

== Ethnic groups in Liangshan, 2010 census ==
Nationality	Population	Percentage
Yi	2,226,755	49.13%
Han	2,155,357	47.55%
Tibetan	60,679 (2000)	1.49% (2000)
Mosuo and Mongol	27,277 (2000)	0.67% (2000)
Hui	18,385 (2000)	0.45% (2000)
Miao	11,912 (2000)	0.29%
Lisu	9,121 (2000)	0.22% (2000)
Buyei	5,459 (2000)	0.13% (2000)
Nakhi	5,199 (2000)	0.13% (2000)
Others	8,751	0.22%

== National Priority Protected Sites ==
Liangshan Yi Autonomous Prefecture contains 4 National Priority Protected Sites

- Dayangdui Site, added in 2006 as part of the 6th Batch of National Priority Protected Sites
- Liangshan Dashi tombs, added in 2006 as part of the 6th Batch of National Priority Protected Sites
  - Wangsuo Dashi Tomb
  - Wuhe Dashi tombs
- Boshen Wahei Stone Carvings, added in 2006 as part of the 6th Batch of National Priority Protected Sites
- Tea Horse Road, added in 2013 as part of the 7th Batch of National Priority Protected Sites
  - Ganluo Qingxi Gorge ancient road
  - Dingshan Bridge and Lingguan Inscriptions in Yuexi
  - Dengxiangying Ancient Post
  - Yalong River Trails in Mianning
  - Songping Pass

== gourmet food ==
Tuotuo meat: Pork or mutton cut into large chunks and cooked before eating, is an important food for Yi festivals and entertaining guests.

Yi ethnic group's roasted suckling pig: roasted over charcoal, with a crispy skin, commonly served at festival banquets.

== See also ==
- Asteroid 121001 Liangshanxichang
