= Dechang County =

Dechang County 德昌县 · ꄓꍣꑤ · ꓔꓷ-ꓛ ꓫꓯ
- County
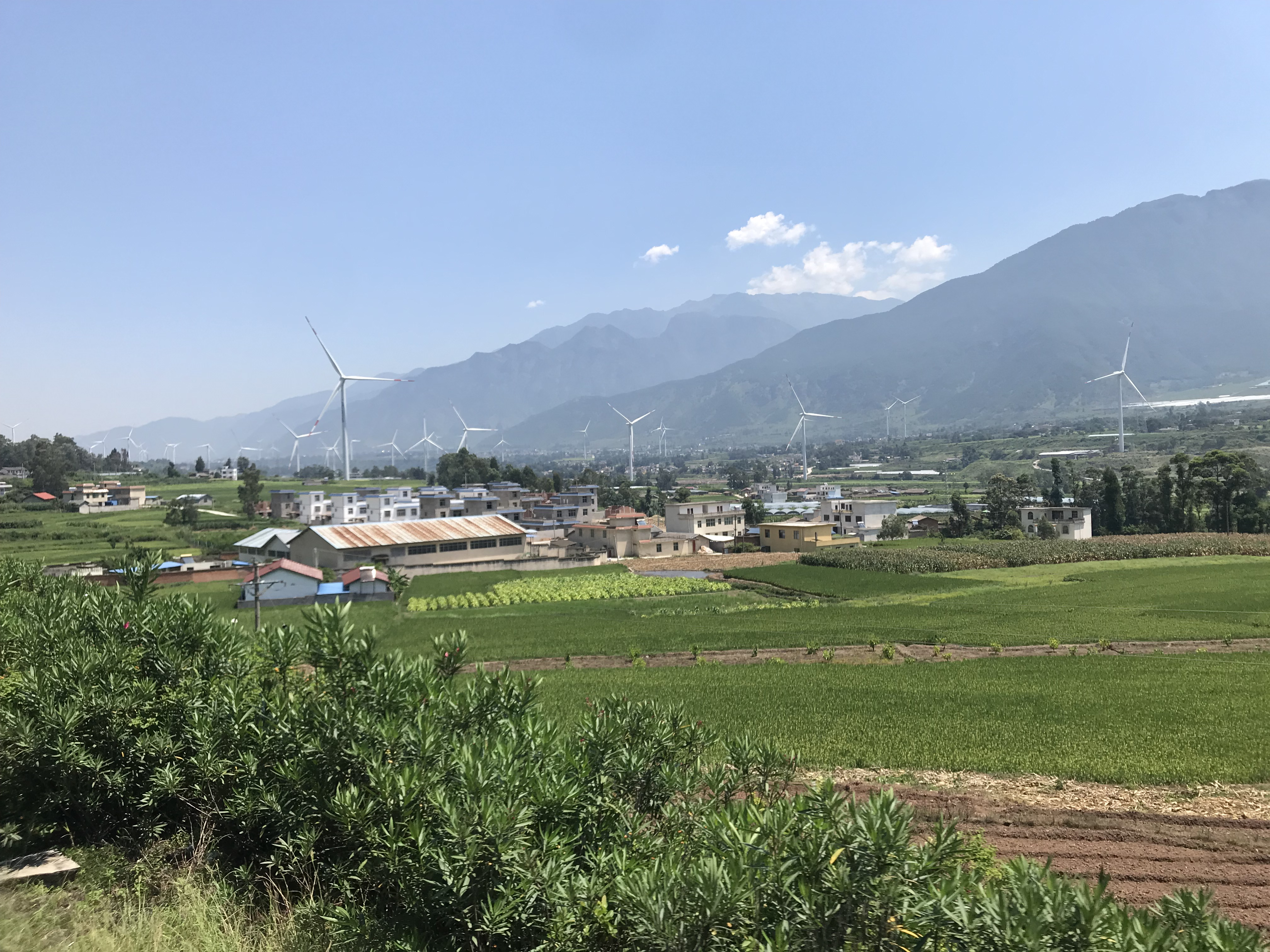

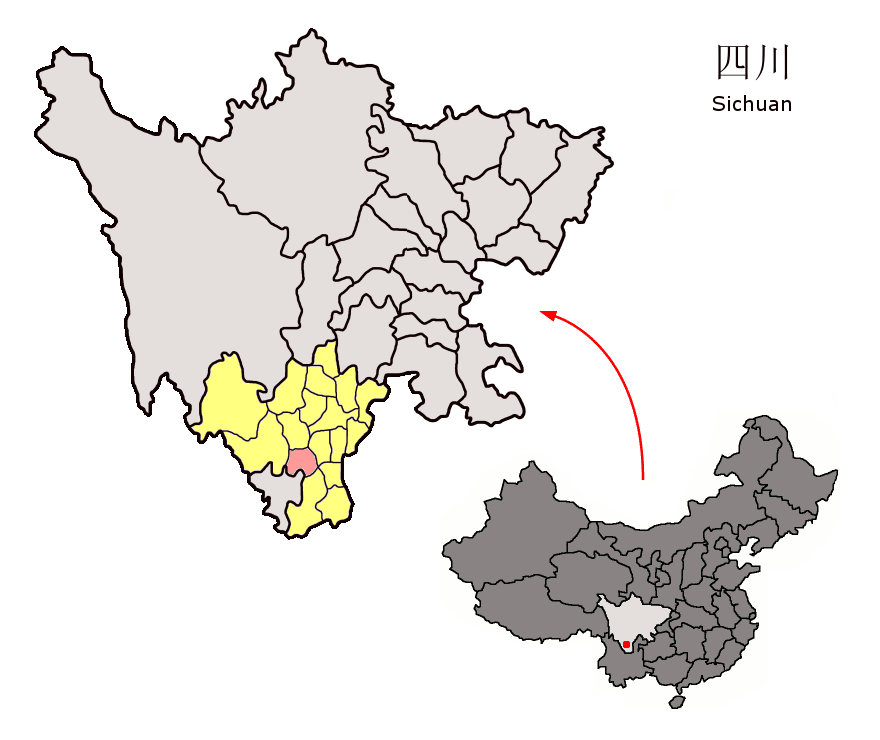
- Location of Dechang County (pink) and Liangshan Prefecture (yellow) within Sichuan

- Location of the seat in Sichuan Dechang (China)
- Country: China
- Province: Sichuan
- Autonomous prefecture: Liangshan
- County seat: Dezhou Subdistrict

Area
  - Total: 2,284 km^{2} (882 sq mi)

Population (2020)
  - Total: 216,533
  - Density: 94.80/km^{2} (245.5/sq mi)
- Time zone: UTC+8 (China Standard)
- Website: www.lsdc.gov.cn

Dechang County

Chinese name
- Simplified Chinese: 德昌县
- Traditional Chinese: 德昌縣
Transcriptions
Standard Mandarin
- Hanyu Pinyin: Déchāng Xiàn

Yi name
- Yi: ꄓꍣꑤ; Romanisation: dep cha xiep

Lisu name
- Lisu: ꓔꓷ-ꓛ ꓫꓯ; Romanisation: de-qa xai

Dechang County (Chinese: 德昌县; Yi: ꄓꍣꑤ; Lisu: ꓔꓷ-ꓛ ꓫꓯ) is a county of southern Sichuan Province, China. It is under the administration of the Liangshan Yi Autonomous Prefecture.

== Administrative divisions ==
Dechang County comprises 2 subdistrict, 8 towns, and 2 ethnic townships.

Name	Simplified Chinese	Hanyu Pinyin	Yi	Romanized Yi	Administrative division code
Subdistricts
Dezhou Subdistrict	德州街道	Dézhōu Jiēdào	ꄓꍏꏦꈜ	dep zho jie gga	513424001
Changzhou Subdistrict	昌州街道	Chāngzhōu Jiēdào	ꍣꍏꏦꈜ	cha zho jie gga	513424002
Towns
Yonglang Town	永郎镇	Yǒngláng Zhèn	ꑿꇂꍔ	yo lap zhep	513424101
Leyue Town	乐跃镇	Lèyuè Zhèn	ꇊꑻꍔ	lop yuo zhep	513424102
Mali Town	麻栗镇	Málì Zhèn	ꂸꆺꍔ	map lip zhep	513424103
Cida Town	茨达镇	Cídá Zhèn	ꋍꄊꍔ	cyp dap zhep	513424106
Badong Town	巴洞镇	Bādòng Zhèn	ꀠꄐꍔ	ba dop zhep	513424109
Heilongtan Town	黑龙潭镇	Hēilóngtán Zhèn	ꉮꇊꄤꍔ	hit lop tap zhep	513424113
Tielu Town	铁炉镇	Tiělú Zhèn	ꄠꍣꍔ	tiep cha zhep	513424114
Rehe Town	热河镇	Rèhé Zhèn	ꏓꉼꍔ	rep hop zhep	513424115
Ethnic townships
Nanshan Lisu Ethnic Township	南山傈僳族乡	Nánshān Lìsùzú Xiāng	ꇂꎭꆀꌠꋇꑣ	lap sha nip su cup xie	513424217
Jinsha Lisu Ethnic Township	金沙傈僳族乡	Jīnshā Lìsùzú Xiāng	ꏠꎭꆀꌠꋇꑣ	jit sha nip su cup xie	513424218

== Climate ==
Climate data for Dechang, elevation 1,380 m (4,530 ft), (1991–2020 normals, extremes 1981–present)
Month	Jan	Feb	Mar	Apr	May	Jun	Jul	Aug	Sep	Oct	Nov	Dec	Year
Record high °C (°F)	25.1 (77.2)	28.1 (82.6)	33.4 (92.1)	34.9 (94.8)	37.3 (99.1)	37.1 (98.8)	35.1 (95.2)	34.4 (93.9)	34.8 (94.6)	32.8 (91.0)	29.6 (85.3)	24.0 (75.2)	37.3 (99.1)
Mean daily maximum °C (°F)	18.7 (65.7)	21.5 (70.7)	25.5 (77.9)	28.4 (83.1)	29.4 (84.9)	28.2 (82.8)	28.2 (82.8)	28.6 (83.5)	25.7 (78.3)	23.4 (74.1)	21.1 (70.0)	18.2 (64.8)	24.7 (76.6)
Daily mean °C (°F)	10.8 (51.4)	13.3 (55.9)	17.1 (62.8)	20.2 (68.4)	22.3 (72.1)	22.7 (72.9)	22.9 (73.2)	22.8 (73.0)	20.5 (68.9)	17.7 (63.9)	14.1 (57.4)	10.9 (51.6)	17.9 (64.3)
Mean daily minimum °C (°F)	5.0 (41.0)	6.9 (44.4)	10.2 (50.4)	13.5 (56.3)	16.7 (62.1)	18.7 (65.7)	19.5 (67.1)	19.0 (66.2)	17.2 (63.0)	14.2 (57.6)	9.5 (49.1)	5.9 (42.6)	13.0 (55.5)
Record low °C (°F)	−2.8 (27.0)	−0.6 (30.9)	0.6 (33.1)	5.0 (41.0)	8.2 (46.8)	12.1 (53.8)	13.7 (56.7)	13.3 (55.9)	9.8 (49.6)	7.7 (45.9)	−0.3 (31.5)	−2.2 (28.0)	−2.8 (27.0)
Average precipitation mm (inches)	5.2 (0.20)	4.7 (0.19)	13.0 (0.51)	23.9 (0.94)	75.5 (2.97)	218.7 (8.61)	232.3 (9.15)	203.5 (8.01)	188.7 (7.43)	87.0 (3.43)	14.1 (0.56)	5.6 (0.22)	1,072.2 (42.22)
Average precipitation days (≥ 0.1 mm)	2.4	2.7	4.6	7.4	12.4	19.6	20.4	18.0	18.2	12.9	4.3	2.2	125.1
Average snowy days	0.4	0.4	0	0	0	0	0	0	0	0	0.1	0.2	1.1
Average relative humidity (%)	54	47	44	48	57	74	80	79	81	77	69	64	65
Mean monthly sunshine hours	222.2	221.4	255.1	255.8	222.3	144.1	146.9	164.2	111.2	131.9	177.9	192.3	2,245.3
Percentage possible sunshine	67	70	68	66	53	35	35	41	31	37	56	60	52
Source: China Meteorological Administration All-time October highall-time November record high
