= Leibo County =

Leibo County 雷波县 · ꃀꁧꑤ
- County
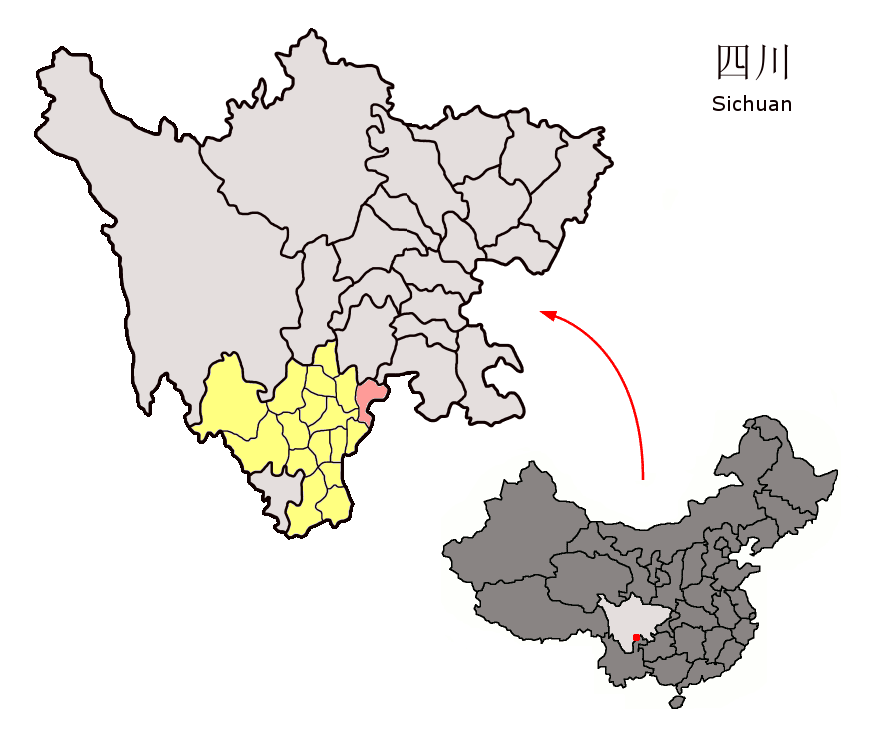
- Location of Leibo County (red) within Liangshan Prefecture (yellow) and Sichuan

- Location of the county seat in Sichuan Leibo (China)
- Coordinates (Leibo County government): 28°15′46″N 103°34′18″E
- Country: China
- Province: Sichuan
- Autonomous prefecture: Liangshan
- County seat: Jincheng

Area
  - Total: 2,932.46 km^{2} (1,132.23 sq mi)
- Elevation: 1,175 m (3,855 ft)

Population (2020)
  - Total: 240,149
  - Density: 81.8934/km^{2} (212.103/sq mi)
- Time zone: UTC+8 (China Standard)
- Postal code: 616550
- Website: www.lbx.gov.cn

Leibo County

Chinese name
- Simplified Chinese: 雷波县
- Traditional Chinese: 雷波縣
Transcriptions
Standard Mandarin
- Hanyu Pinyin: Léibō Xiàn

Yi name
- Yi: ꃀꁧꑤ; Romanisation: mop bbo xiep

Leibo County (Chinese: 雷波县, Yi: ꃀꁧꑤ) is a mountainous county of southern Sichuan province, China, along the border with Yunnan. It is under the administration of the Liangshan Yi Autonomous Prefecture, and has a population of 223,000, 91% of whom are agricultural, residing in an area of 2,932.46 square kilometres (1,132.23 sq mi); the Yi are the largest ethnic group, forming 45% of the population. Ayi Jihu, a singer signed to British company Shlepp Records, is from Leibo County.

== Administrative divisions ==
Leibo County comprises 11 towns and 10 townships.

Name	Simplified Chinese	Hanyu Pinyin	Yi	Romanized Yi	Administrative division code
Towns
Jincheng Town	锦城镇	Jǐnchéng Zhèn	ꏢꍰꍔ	ji chep zhep	513437100
Xining Town	西宁镇	Xīníng Zhèn	ꌦꇗꍔ	sy lyp zhep	513437101
Wenshui Town	汶水镇	Wènshuǐ Zhèn	ꋦꈯꍔ	zzur ggur zhep	513437102
Huanglang Town	黄琅镇	Huángláng Zhèn	ꉐꇁꍔ	hxa la zhep	513437103
Jinsha Town	金沙镇	Jīnshā Zhèn	ꏠꎫꍔ	jit shat zhep	513437104
Yongzheng Town	永盛镇	Yǒngshèng Zhèn	ꑿꎹꍔ	yo shep zhep	513437105
Dukou Town	渡口镇	Dùkǒu Zhèn	ꄗꈈꍔ	dup ko zhep	513437106
Majingzi Town	马颈子镇	Mǎjǐngzǐ Zhèn	ꂶꏢꌅꍔ	max ji nzy zhep	513437107
Shangtianba Town	上田坝镇	Shàngtiánbà Zhèn	ꃪꆊꐟꈯꍔ	vat not jjiep ggur zhep	513437108
Wagang Town	瓦岗镇	Wǎgǎng Zhèn	ꃪꈜꍔ	vat gga zhep	513437109
Baoshan Town	宝山镇	Bǎoshān Zhèn	ꇱꄹꇓꆈꍔ	gep ddip lur nuo zhep	513437110
Townships
Qingkou Township	箐口乡	Qìngkǒu Xiāng	ꌭꈈꑣ	ssip ko xie	513437203
Ganzi Township	柑子乡	Gānzǐ Xiāng	ꇤꌅꑣ	ga nzy xie	513437214
Guihua Township	桂花乡	Guìhuā Xiāng	ꇭꉵꑣ	gop huot xie	513437217
Shanlenggang Township	山棱岗乡	Shānlénggǎng Xiāng	ꌐꆺꇢꑣ	sat lip gat xie	513437220
Gudui Township	谷堆乡	Gǔduī Xiāng	ꇴꊪꑣ	gu zy xie	513437222
Lami Township	拉咪乡	Lāmī Xiāng	ꇁꃅꑣ	la mu xie	513437224
Qianwanguan Township	千万贯乡	Qiānwànguàn Xiāng	ꊮꉐꈢꑣ	cit hxa ggot xie	513437227
Mohong Township	莫红乡	Mòhóng Xiāng	ꃀꉘꑣ	mop hxo xie	513437233
Bagu Township	巴姑乡	Bāgū Xiāng	ꁠꈯꑣ	bba ggur xie	513437237
Kahaluo Township	卡哈洛乡	Kǎhāluò Xiāng	ꈁꉐꇉꑣ	ka hxa lo xie	513437241

== Geography and climate ==
Leibo County ranges in latitude from 27° 49' to 28° 36' N and in longitude from 103° 10' to 103° 52' E, and lies on the northern bank of the Jinsha River in the Hengduan Mountains in the eastern portion of Liangshan Prefecture. It borders Yongshan County (Yunnan) to the southeast across the river, the cities of Yibin and Leshan to the north, Meigu County to the west, and Zhaojue and Jinyang counties to the southwest. Elevations range from 325 metres (1,066 ft) along the banks of the Jinsha, also the lowest point in the prefecture, to 4,076.5 m (13,374 ft) at Mount Shizi (Chinese: 狮子山; pinyin: Shīzi Shān; lit. 'lion mountain'), and generally increase from east to west.

Due to its low latitude and elevation above 1,150 m (3,770 ft), Leibo has a monsoon-influenced subtropical highland climate bordering on a humid subtropical climate (Köppen Cwb/Cwa), with very warm, rainy summers and cool, damp winters. The monthly 24-hour average temperature ranges from 3.9 °C (39.0 °F) in January to 22.6 °C (72.7 °F) in July, while the annual mean is 14.0 °C (57.2 °F). Rainfall is extremely common year-round, occurring on 207−208 days of the year, but over half of the annual total occurs from June to August. The frost-free period averages 270 days, and there are 1,225 hours of sunshine annually.

Climate data for Leibo, elevation 1,256 m (4,121 ft), (1991–2020 normals, extremes 1981–2010)
Month	Jan	Feb	Mar	Apr	May	Jun	Jul	Aug	Sep	Oct	Nov	Dec	Year
Record high °C (°F)	18.0 (64.4)	30.0 (86.0)	34.4 (93.9)	31.9 (89.4)	33.7 (92.7)	35.0 (95.0)	34.3 (93.7)	35.3 (95.5)	35.5 (95.9)	28.4 (83.1)	24.1 (75.4)	19.3 (66.7)	35.5 (95.9)
Mean daily maximum °C (°F)	7.0 (44.6)	10.2 (50.4)	15.2 (59.4)	20.4 (68.7)	23.2 (73.8)	24.7 (76.5)	27.6 (81.7)	27.4 (81.3)	23.1 (73.6)	18.0 (64.4)	13.9 (57.0)	8.5 (47.3)	18.3 (64.9)
Daily mean °C (°F)	3.9 (39.0)	6.3 (43.3)	10.4 (50.7)	15.2 (59.4)	18.3 (64.9)	20.5 (68.9)	22.7 (72.9)	22.4 (72.3)	19.0 (66.2)	14.7 (58.5)	10.5 (50.9)	5.4 (41.7)	14.1 (57.4)
Mean daily minimum °C (°F)	2.0 (35.6)	3.8 (38.8)	7.3 (45.1)	11.5 (52.7)	14.8 (58.6)	17.5 (63.5)	19.5 (67.1)	19.1 (66.4)	16.5 (61.7)	12.7 (54.9)	8.4 (47.1)	3.4 (38.1)	11.4 (52.5)
Record low °C (°F)	−7.9 (17.8)	−6.6 (20.1)	−4.8 (23.4)	0.3 (32.5)	4.4 (39.9)	9.6 (49.3)	12.5 (54.5)	12.9 (55.2)	8.3 (46.9)	0.1 (32.2)	−2.3 (27.9)	−8.9 (16.0)	−8.9 (16.0)
Average precipitation mm (inches)	10.8 (0.43)	10.1 (0.40)	26.4 (1.04)	56.6 (2.23)	87.6 (3.45)	148.7 (5.85)	184.9 (7.28)	174.5 (6.87)	100.7 (3.96)	45.7 (1.80)	14.0 (0.55)	7.8 (0.31)	867.8 (34.17)
Average precipitation days (≥ 0.1 mm)	11.4	9.2	12.2	14.0	15.5	18.7	16.8	16.3	16.5	17.2	11.7	10.6	170.1
Average snowy days	6.9	3.4	0.3	0	0	0	0	0	0	0	0.4	2.4	13.4
Average relative humidity (%)	79	76	74	73	74	81	82	82	84	84	81	80	79
Mean monthly sunshine hours	54.5	71.5	94.5	115.7	110.2	80.9	129.0	143.7	80.3	49.7	60.8	52.0	1,042.8
Percentage possible sunshine	17	23	25	30	26	19	30	36	22	14	19	16	23
Source 1: China Meteorological Administration
Source 2: Weather China
