= Nuosu =

Nuosu may refer to:

- Yi people, of southern China and Vietnam and Thailand
- Nuosu language, also known as Yi, their Sino-Tibetan language, the prestige language of the Yi people
