= Shatuo Township, Sichuan =

Shatuo Township 沙沱乡
- Township
- Shatuoxiang
- Location in Sichuan
- Coordinates: 28°32′38″N 103°40′30″E
- Country: People's Republic of China
- Province: Sichuan
- Autonomous prefecture: Liangshan Yi Autonomous Prefecture
- County: Leibo County

Area
  - Total: 73.93 km^{2} (28.54 sq mi)

Population (2010)
  - Total: 2,518
  - Density: 34.06/km^{2} (88.21/sq mi)
- Time zone: UTC+8 (China Standard)

Shatuo (Chinese: 沙沱乡) is a township in Leibo County, Liangshan Yi Autonomous Prefecture, Sichuan, China. In 2010, Shatuo Township had a total population of 2,518: 1,311 males and 1,207 females: 713 aged under 14, 1,586 aged between 15 and 65 and 219 aged over 65.
