= Puge County =

Puge County 普格县 · ꁌꐘꑤ
- County
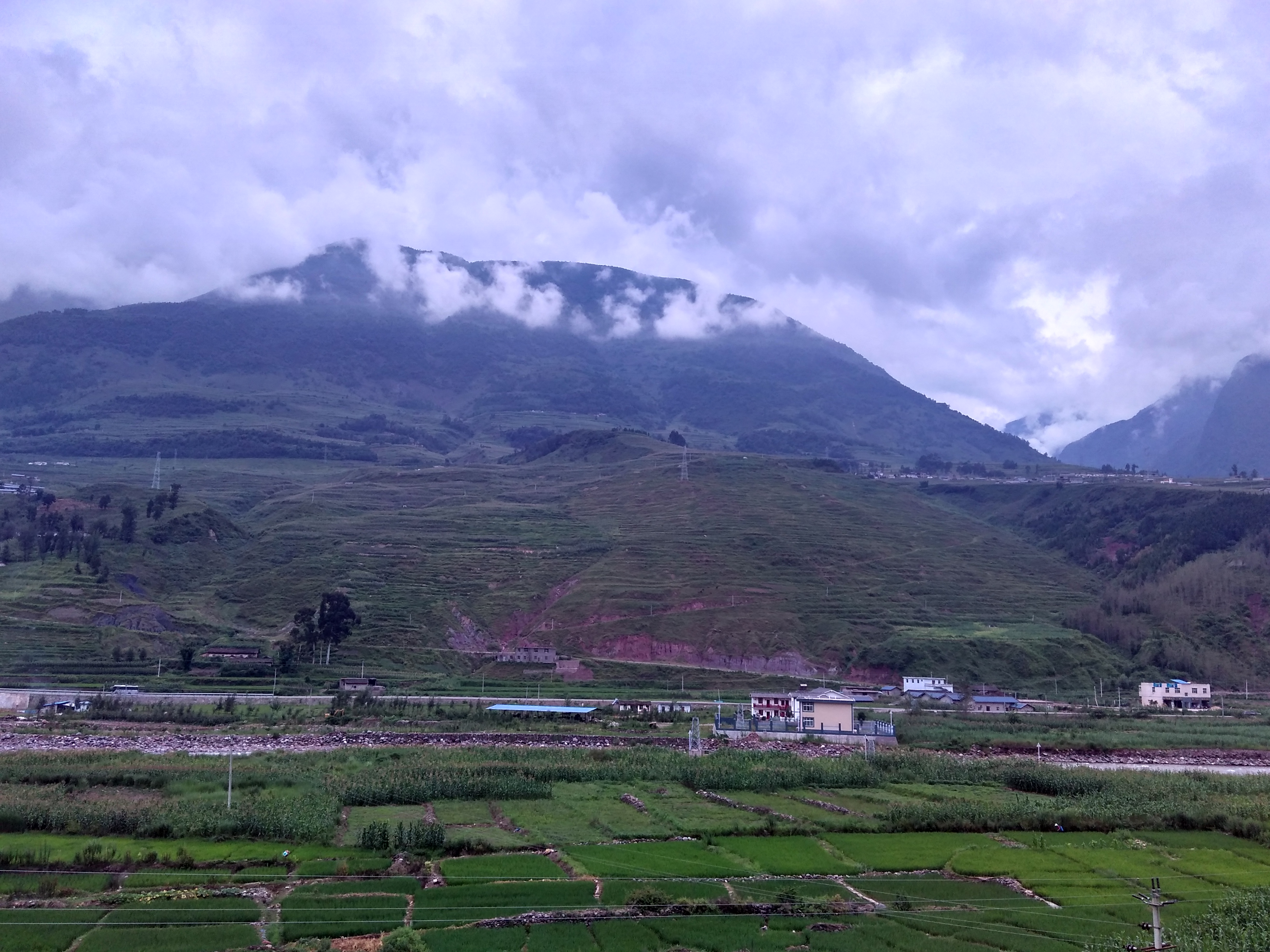

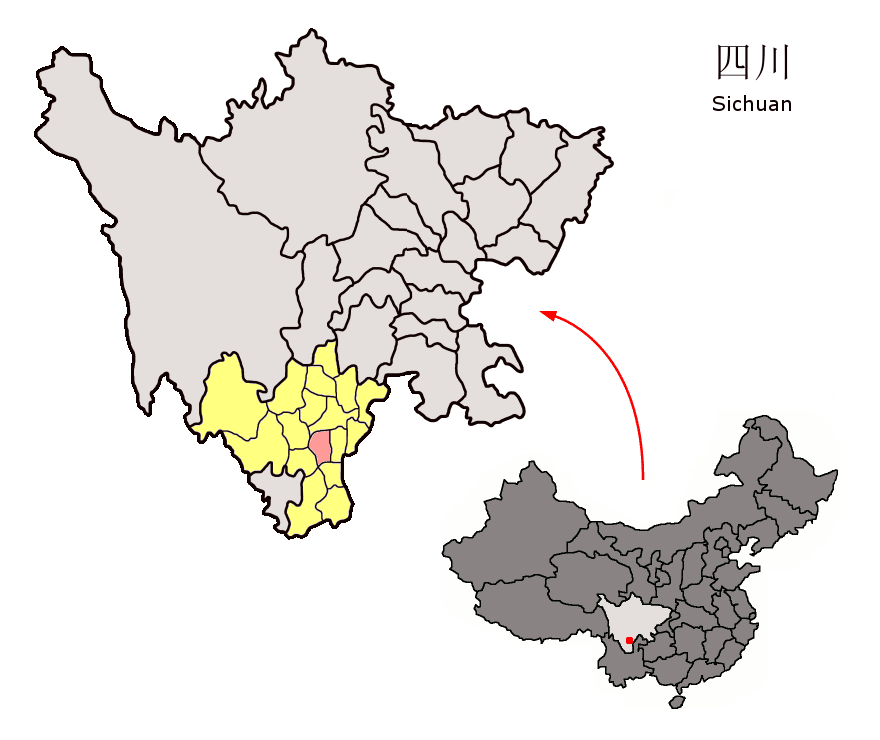
- Location of Puge County (red) within Liangshan Prefecture (yellow) and Sichuan

- Location within Sichuan Location within China
- Coordinates (County seat (Puji Town)): 27°22′34″N 102°32′28″E
- Country: China
- Province: Sichuan
- Autonomous prefecture: Liangshan
- County seat: Puji

Area
  - Total: 1,905 km^{2} (736 sq mi)

Population (2020)
  - Total: 180,052
  - Density: 94.52/km^{2} (244.8/sq mi)
- Time zone: UTC+8 (China Standard)
- Website: www.pgx.gov.cn

Puge County

Chinese name
- Simplified Chinese: 普格县
- Traditional Chinese: 普格縣
Transcriptions
Standard Mandarin
- Hanyu Pinyin: Pǔgé Xiàn

Yi name
- Yi: ꁌꐘꑤ; Romanisation: pu jjit xiep

Puge County (Chinese: 普格县, Yi: ꁌꐘꑤ) is a county in the south of Sichuan Province, China. It is under the administration of the Liangshan Yi Autonomous Prefecture.

== Governance ==
=== Puge County Public Security Bureau ===
The Puge County Public Security Bureau (Chinese: 普格县公安局) is the primary police agency in Puge county. The Incumbent Director of the agency is Mao Xi, which is also the vice mayor.

==== Organization and Structure ====
It contains a cybercrime and intelligence unit, a national security unit, a investigations unit, a traffic management unit, a patrol unit, a SWAT unit, a political/public relations unit and a narcotics unit.

The agency operates 6 police stations in Puji town, Qiaowo town, Luojishan Town, Huashan Town, Menggan Township(now known as Xiluo Town, though the police station retains the original name) and Jiatie town.

==== History ====
In December 2021, the Puge County Public Security Bureau arrested 28 people on scam-related charges.

On February 1, 2023 the Puge County Public Security Bureau arrested 9 people on drug related crimes.

==== Controversies ====
On August 19, 2014, the commanding officer of the Puji town police station at the time went under investigation due to disciplinary violations.

=== Puge County Fire and Rescue Bureau ===
The Puge County Fire and Rescue Bureau (Chinese: 普格县消防救援局) is the primary firefighting and rescue agency in Puge County. It was formerly known as the Puge County Fire and Rescue Battalion (Chinese: 普格县消防救援大队). The incumbent commissioner is Li Zhe. It operates a single fire station in Puji town.

== Administrative divisions ==
Puge County comprises 8 towns and 5 townships.

Name	Simplified Chinese	Hanyu Pinyin	Yi	Romanized Yi	Administrative division code
Towns
Puji town	普基镇	Pǔjī Zhèn	ꁌꐘꍔ	pu jjit zhep	513428100
Qiaowo town	荞窝镇	Qiáowō Zhèn	ꐇꊈꍔ	quop wo zhep	513428101
Luojishan Town	螺髻山镇	Luójìshān Zhèn	ꉢꉳꁧꍔ	nga ha bbo zhep	513428102
Wudaoqing town	五道箐镇	Wǔdàoqìng Zhèn	ꃶꄌꏼꍔ	vu duo qit zhep	513428103
Huashan Town	花山镇	Huāshān Zhèn	ꉵꎭꍔ	huot sha zhep	513428104
Ridudisa Town	日都迪萨镇	Rìdūdísà Zhèn			513428105
Xiluo Town	西洛镇	Xīluò Zhèn			513428106
Jiatie town	夹铁镇	Jiātiě Zhèn	ꏦꄚꍔ	jie tit zhep	513428107
Townships
Li'an Township	黎安乡	Lí'ān Xiāng	ꆀꉢꑣ	nip nga xie	513428203
Daping Township, Puge	大坪乡	Dàpíng Xiāng	ꅔꃀꑣ	ndip mop xie	513428206
Tezi Township	特兹乡	Tèzī Xiāng	ꄮꌅꑣ	te nzy xie	513428213
Waluo Township	瓦洛乡	Wǎluò Xiāng	ꃪꇉꑣ	vat lo xie	513428218
Dacao Township	大槽乡	Dàcáo Xiāng	ꄊꊼꑣ	dap cuop xie	513428227

== Tourist attractions ==
- Luojishan Scenic Area (螺髻山风景区) in Luojiashan Town (螺髻山镇). Located in Luojia Mountain (Luojiashan) area, whose highest peak, Peak Yeeeha (也俄额哈; Yěééhā) has the elevation of 4,359 m (14,301 ft).

== Climate ==
Climate data for Puge, elevation 1,428 m (4,685 ft), (1991–2020 normals, extremes 1981–present)
Month	Jan	Feb	Mar	Apr	May	Jun	Jul	Aug	Sep	Oct	Nov	Dec	Year
Record high °C (°F)	25.8 (78.4)	28.0 (82.4)	32.7 (90.9)	35.4 (95.7)	37.8 (100.0)	35.1 (95.2)	33.1 (91.6)	33.4 (92.1)	32.9 (91.2)	30.2 (86.4)	29.2 (84.6)	25.6 (78.1)	37.8 (100.0)
Mean daily maximum °C (°F)	15.1 (59.2)	18.6 (65.5)	23.4 (74.1)	26.7 (80.1)	27.4 (81.3)	26.2 (79.2)	26.7 (80.1)	26.8 (80.2)	24.2 (75.6)	20.9 (69.6)	18.7 (65.7)	15.2 (59.4)	22.5 (72.5)
Daily mean °C (°F)	8.6 (47.5)	12.0 (53.6)	16.3 (61.3)	19.8 (67.6)	21.5 (70.7)	21.7 (71.1)	22.3 (72.1)	21.9 (71.4)	19.5 (67.1)	16.3 (61.3)	12.8 (55.0)	9.1 (48.4)	16.8 (62.3)
Mean daily minimum °C (°F)	4.0 (39.2)	6.8 (44.2)	10.6 (51.1)	14.1 (57.4)	16.7 (62.1)	18.3 (64.9)	19.1 (66.4)	18.6 (65.5)	16.6 (61.9)	13.4 (56.1)	9.1 (48.4)	5.1 (41.2)	12.7 (54.9)
Record low °C (°F)	−3.9 (25.0)	−3.0 (26.6)	−2.1 (28.2)	4.3 (39.7)	5.6 (42.1)	11.6 (52.9)	13.0 (55.4)	12.2 (54.0)	8.8 (47.8)	4.5 (40.1)	−0.6 (30.9)	−4.6 (23.7)	−4.6 (23.7)
Average precipitation mm (inches)	16.1 (0.63)	14.0 (0.55)	22.1 (0.87)	37.0 (1.46)	105.9 (4.17)	243.6 (9.59)	234.0 (9.21)	184.5 (7.26)	183.5 (7.22)	124.6 (4.91)	27.4 (1.08)	9.8 (0.39)	1,202.5 (47.34)
Average precipitation days (≥ 0.1 mm)	4.1	4.4	6.0	8.0	13.2	19.7	18.8	17.6	17.6	15.0	6.5	3.1	134
Average snowy days	2.0	1.3	0.2	0	0	0	0	0	0	0	0.2	0.8	4.5
Average relative humidity (%)	61	51	47	49	60	78	83	82	83	82	73	69	68
Mean monthly sunshine hours	188.2	191.7	233.9	239.2	206.7	130.3	143.3	156.0	114.4	125.0	165.9	171.9	2,066.5
Percentage possible sunshine	57	60	63	62	49	32	34	39	31	36	52	53	47
Source: China Meteorological Administration all-time extreme temperatureall-time November record high
