= Yi Radicals =

- Range: U+A490..U+A4CF (64 code points)
- Plane: BMP
- Scripts: Yi
- Major alphabets: Nuosu (Yi)
- Assigned: 55 code points
- Unused: 9 reserved code points

Unicode version history
- 3.0 (1999): 50 (+50)
- 3.2 (2002): 55 (+5)

Unicode documentation
- Code chart ∣ Web page

Yi Radicals is a Unicode block containing character elements used for organizing Yi dictionaries in the standard Liangshan Yi script.

== List of radicals ==
| Code | Glyph | Unicode name | Reference syllable |
|---|---|---|---|
| U+A490 | ꒐ | YI RADICAL QOT | ꐈ |
| U+A491 | ꒑ | YI RADICAL LI | ꆹ |
| U+A492 | ꒒ | YI RADICAL KIT | ꇸ |
| U+A493 | ꒓ | YI RADICAL NYIP | ꑍ |
| U+A494 | ꒔ | YI RADICAL CYP | ꋍ |
| U+A495 | ꒕ | YI RADICAL SSI | ꌬ |
| U+A496 | ꒖ | YI RADICAL GGOP | ꈥ |
| U+A497 | ꒗ | YI RADICAL GEP | ꇱ |
| U+A498 | ꒘ | YI RADICAL MI | ꂰ |
| U+A499 | ꒙ | YI RADICAL HXIT | ꉆ |
| U+A49A | ꒚ | YI RADICAL LYR | ꇙ |
| U+A49B | ꒛ | YI RADICAL BBUT | ꁬ |
| U+A49C | ꒜ | YI RADICAL MOP | ꃀ |
| U+A49D | ꒝ | YI RADICAL YO | ꑿ |
| U+A49E | ꒞ | YI RADICAL PUT | ꁊ |
| U+A49F | ꒟ | YI RADICAL HXUO | ꉔ |
| U+A4A0 | ꒠ | YI RADICAL TAT | ꄡ |
| U+A4A1 | ꒡ | YI RADICAL GA | ꇤ |
| U+A4A2 | ꒢ | YI RADICAL ZUP | ꊥ |
| U+A4A3 | ꒣ | YI RADICAL CYT | ꋊ |
| U+A4A4 | ꒤ | YI RADICAL DDUR | ꅐ |
| U+A4A5 | ꒥ | YI RADICAL BUR | ꀱ |
| U+A4A6 | ꒦ | YI RADICAL GGUO | ꈠ |
| U+A4A7 | ꒧ | YI RADICAL NYOP | ꑘ |
| U+A4A8 | ꒨ | YI RADICAL TU | ꄲ |
| U+A4A9 | ꒩ | YI RADICAL OP | ꀒ |
| U+A4AA | ꒪ | YI RADICAL JJUT | ꐧ |
| U+A4AB | ꒫ | YI RADICAL ZOT | ꊛ |
| U+A4AC | ꒬ | YI RADICAL PYT | ꁐ |
| U+A4AD | ꒭ | YI RADICAL HMO | ꂡ |
| U+A4AE | ꒮ | YI RADICAL YIT | ꑱ |
| U+A4AF | ꒯ | YI RADICAL VUR | ꃹ |
| U+A4B0 | ꒰ | YI RADICAL SHY | ꏂ |
| U+A4B1 | ꒱ | YI RADICAL VEP | ꃳ |
| U+A4B2 | ꒲ | YI RADICAL ZA | ꊖ |
| U+A4B3 | ꒳ | YI RADICAL JO | ꏮ |
| U+A4B4 | ꒴ | YI RADICAL NZUP | ꌀ |
| U+A4B5 | ꒵ | YI RADICAL JJY | ꐯ |
| U+A4B6 | ꒶ | YI RADICAL GOT | ꇪ |
| U+A4B7 | ꒷ | YI RADICAL JJIE | ꐞ |
| U+A4B8 | ꒸ | YI RADICAL WO | ꊈ |
| U+A4B9 | ꒹ | YI RADICAL DU | ꄖ |
| U+A4BA | ꒺ | YI RADICAL SHUR | ꎿ |
| U+A4BB | ꒻ | YI RADICAL LIE | ꆽ |
| U+A4BC | ꒼ | YI RADICAL CY | ꋌ |
| U+A4BD | ꒽ | YI RADICAL CUOP | ꊼ |
| U+A4BE | ꒾ | YI RADICAL CIP | ꊱ |
| U+A4BF | ꒿ | YI RADICAL HXOP | ꉙ |
| U+A4C0 | ꓀ | YI RADICAL SHAT | ꎫ |
| U+A4C1 | ꓁ | YI RADICAL ZUR | ꊧ |
| U+A4C2 | ꓂ | YI RADICAL SHOP | ꎵ |
| U+A4C3 | ꓃ | YI RADICAL CHE | ꍯ |
| U+A4C4 | ꓄ | YI RADICAL ZZIET | ꋔ |
| U+A4C5 | ꓅ | YI RADICAL NBIE | ꁻ |
| U+A4C6 | ꓆ | YI RADICAL KE | ꈌ |

== Block ==
Yi Radicals^{[1]}^{[2]} Official Unicode Consortium code chart (PDF)
| | 0 | 1 | 2 | 3 | 4 | 5 | 6 | 7 | 8 | 9 | A | B | C | D | E | F |
| U+A49x | ꒐ | ꒑ | ꒒ | ꒓ | ꒔ | ꒕ | ꒖ | ꒗ | ꒘ | ꒙ | ꒚ | ꒛ | ꒜ | ꒝ | ꒞ | ꒟ |
| U+A4Ax | ꒠ | ꒡ | ꒢ | ꒣ | ꒤ | ꒥ | ꒦ | ꒧ | ꒨ | ꒩ | ꒪ | ꒫ | ꒬ | ꒭ | ꒮ | ꒯ |
| U+A4Bx | ꒰ | ꒱ | ꒲ | ꒳ | ꒴ | ꒵ | ꒶ | ꒷ | ꒸ | ꒹ | ꒺ | ꒻ | ꒼ | ꒽ | ꒾ | ꒿ |
| U+A4Cx | ꓀ | ꓁ | ꓂ | ꓃ | ꓄ | ꓅ | ꓆ | | | | | | | | | |
Notes: 1. As of Unicode version 16.0; 2. Grey areas indicate non-assigned code points

== History ==
The following Unicode-related documents record the purpose and process of defining specific characters in the Yi Radicals block:

| Version | Final code points (Note: Proposed code points and characters names may differ from final code points and names) | Count | L2 ID | WG2 ID | Document |
|---|---|---|---|---|---|
| 3.0 | U+A490..A4A1, A4A4..A4B3, A4B5..A4C0, A4C2..A4C4, A4C6 | 50 | | N921R | China's requirements for extensions to the repertoire of ISO/IEC 10646.1, 1993-10-26 |
| 3.0 | U+A490..A4A1, A4A4..A4B3, A4B5..A4C0, A4C2..A4C4, A4C6 | 50 | | N965 | Proposal for encoding Yi script on BMP of ISO/IEC 10646, 1994-01-01 |
| 3.0 | U+A490..A4A1, A4A4..A4B3, A4B5..A4C0, A4C2..A4C4, A4C6 | 50 | X3L2/94-098 | N1033 (pdf, doc) | Umamaheswaran, V. S.; Ksar, Mike (1994-06-01), Unconfirmed Minutes of ISO/IEC JTC 1/SC 2/WG 2 Meeting 25, Falez Hotel, Antalya, Turkey, 1994-04-18--22 |
| 3.0 | U+A490..A4A1, A4A4..A4B3, A4B5..A4C0, A4C2..A4C4, A4C6 | 50 | | N1074 | Ross, Hugh McGregor (1994-09-22), A Simple Way of Coding and Implementing the Yi Syllabary |
| 3.0 | U+A490..A4A1, A4A4..A4B3, A4B5..A4C0, A4C2..A4C4, A4C6 | 50 | X3L2/96-098 | N1187 | Everson, Michael (1995-03-24), Encoding the Yi script |
| 3.0 | U+A490..A4A1, A4A4..A4B3, A4B5..A4C0, A4C2..A4C4, A4C6 | 50 | X3L2/96-099 | N1415 | Proposal fo[r] Encoding Yi Script on BMP of ISO/IEC 10646, 1996-06-11 |
| 3.0 | U+A490..A4A1, A4A4..A4B3, A4B5..A4C0, A4C2..A4C4, A4C6 | 50 | | N1453 | Ksar, Mike; Umamaheswaran, V. S. (1996-12-06), WG 2 Minutes - Quebec Meeting 31 |
| 3.0 | U+A490..A4A1, A4A4..A4B3, A4B5..A4C0, A4C2..A4C4, A4C6 | 50 | X3L2/96-123 | | Aliprand, Joan; Winkler, Arnold (1996-12-18), "4.2 Yi script", Preliminary Minutes - UTC #71 & X3L2 #168 ad hoc meeting, San Diego - December 5-6, 1996 |
| 3.0 | U+A490..A4A1, A4A4..A4B3, A4B5..A4C0, A4C2..A4C4, A4C6 | 50 | L2/97-021 | N1482 | Yi radicals encoding, 1997-01-05 |
| 3.0 | U+A490..A4A1, A4A4..A4B3, A4B5..A4C0, A4C2..A4C4, A4C6 | 50 | L2/97-046 | N1531 | Mao, Yong Gang (1997-03-19), Proposed Yi code table and name list for pDAM |
| 3.0 | U+A490..A4A1, A4A4..A4B3, A4B5..A4C0, A4C2..A4C4, A4C6 | 50 | L2/97-030 | N1503 (pdf, doc) | Umamaheswaran, V. S.; Ksar, Mike (1997-04-01), "8.4.2 Yi radicals", Unconfirmed Minutes of WG 2 Meeting #32, Singapore; 1997-01-20--24 |
| 3.0 | U+A490..A4A1, A4A4..A4B3, A4B5..A4C0, A4C2..A4C4, A4C6 | 50 | L2/97-156 | N1611 | Yi Radical high quality text for p_DAM, 1997-06-20 |
| 3.0 | U+A490..A4A1, A4A4..A4B3, A4B5..A4C0, A4C2..A4C4, A4C6 | 50 | L2/97-288 | N1603 | Umamaheswaran, V. S. (1997-10-24), "8.8", Unconfirmed Meeting Minutes, WG 2 Meeting # 33, Heraklion, Crete, Greece, 20 June – 4 July 1997 |
| 3.0 | U+A490..A4A1, A4A4..A4B3, A4B5..A4C0, A4C2..A4C4, A4C6 | 50 | | N1831 | Paterson, Bruce (1998-04-15), PDAM14 - Yi Script |
| 3.0 | U+A490..A4A1, A4A4..A4B3, A4B5..A4C0, A4C2..A4C4, A4C6 | 50 | L2/98-158 | | Aliprand, Joan; Winkler, Arnold (1998-05-26), "Yi PDAM 14", Draft Minutes – UTC #76 & NCITS Subgroup L2 #173 joint meeting, Tredyffrin, Pennsylvania, April 20-22, 1998 |
| 3.0 | U+A490..A4A1, A4A4..A4B3, A4B5..A4C0, A4C2..A4C4, A4C6 | 50 | | N1814 (html, doc) | Revised Proposal for Yi Characters and Yi Radicals, 1998-07-26 |
| 3.0 | U+A490..A4A1, A4A4..A4B3, A4B5..A4C0, A4C2..A4C4, A4C6 | 50 | | N1863 | Explanation of WG2 N1814 (Yi), 1998-09-16 |
| 3.0 | U+A490..A4A1, A4A4..A4B3, A4B5..A4C0, A4C2..A4C4, A4C6 | 50 | | N1890 | Whistler, Ken; Everson, Michael; Chen, Zhuang (1998-09-23), Report of Yi ad hoc committee |
| 3.0 | U+A490..A4A1, A4A4..A4B3, A4B5..A4C0, A4C2..A4C4, A4C6 | 50 | | N1925 | Disposition of Comments - PDAM14 - Yi - SC2 N3214, 1998-11-02 |
| 3.0 | U+A490..A4A1, A4A4..A4B3, A4B5..A4C0, A4C2..A4C4, A4C6 | 50 | | N1926 | Paterson, Bruce (1998-11-02), Text FPDAM 14 - Yi - SC2 N3215 |
| 3.0 | U+A490..A4A1, A4A4..A4B3, A4B5..A4C0, A4C2..A4C4, A4C6 | 50 | L2/99-095.1 | N1987-2 | Irish comments on CD ISO/IEC 10646-1/FPDAM 14 (Yi), 1999-01-19 |
| 3.0 | U+A490..A4A1, A4A4..A4B3, A4B5..A4C0, A4C2..A4C4, A4C6 | 50 | L2/99-165 | N1945R | Everson, Michael; et al. (1999-03-23), Ad-hoc report on Yi radicals from the Fukuoka meeting (1999-03-15), with subsequent addendum (1999-03-23) |
| 3.0 | U+A490..A4A1, A4A4..A4B3, A4B5..A4C0, A4C2..A4C4, A4C6 | 50 | L2/99-232 | N2003 | Umamaheswaran, V. S. (1999-08-03), "6.2.1 FPDAM14 - Yi syllables and Yi radicals", Minutes of WG 2 meeting 36, Fukuoka, Japan, 1999-03-09--15 |
| 3.2 | U+A4A2..A4A3, A4B4, A4C1, A4C5 (Note: See also L2/99-165 and earlier Yi Radicals documents) | 5 | | N2207 | Request for five Yi radicals missing from the UCS, 2000-03-18 |
| 3.2 | U+A4A2..A4A3, A4B4, A4C1, A4C5 | 5 | L2/00-234 | N2203 (rtf, txt) | Umamaheswaran, V. S. (2000-07-21), "8.21", Minutes from the SC2/WG2 meeting in Beijing, 2000-03-21 -- 24 |
| 3.2 | U+A4A2..A4A3, A4B4, A4C1, A4C5 | 5 | L2/00-115R2 | | Moore, Lisa (2000-08-08), "Motion 83-M2", Minutes Of UTC Meeting #83 |
