= Ganluo County =

Ganluo County 甘洛县 • ꇤꇉꑤ
- County
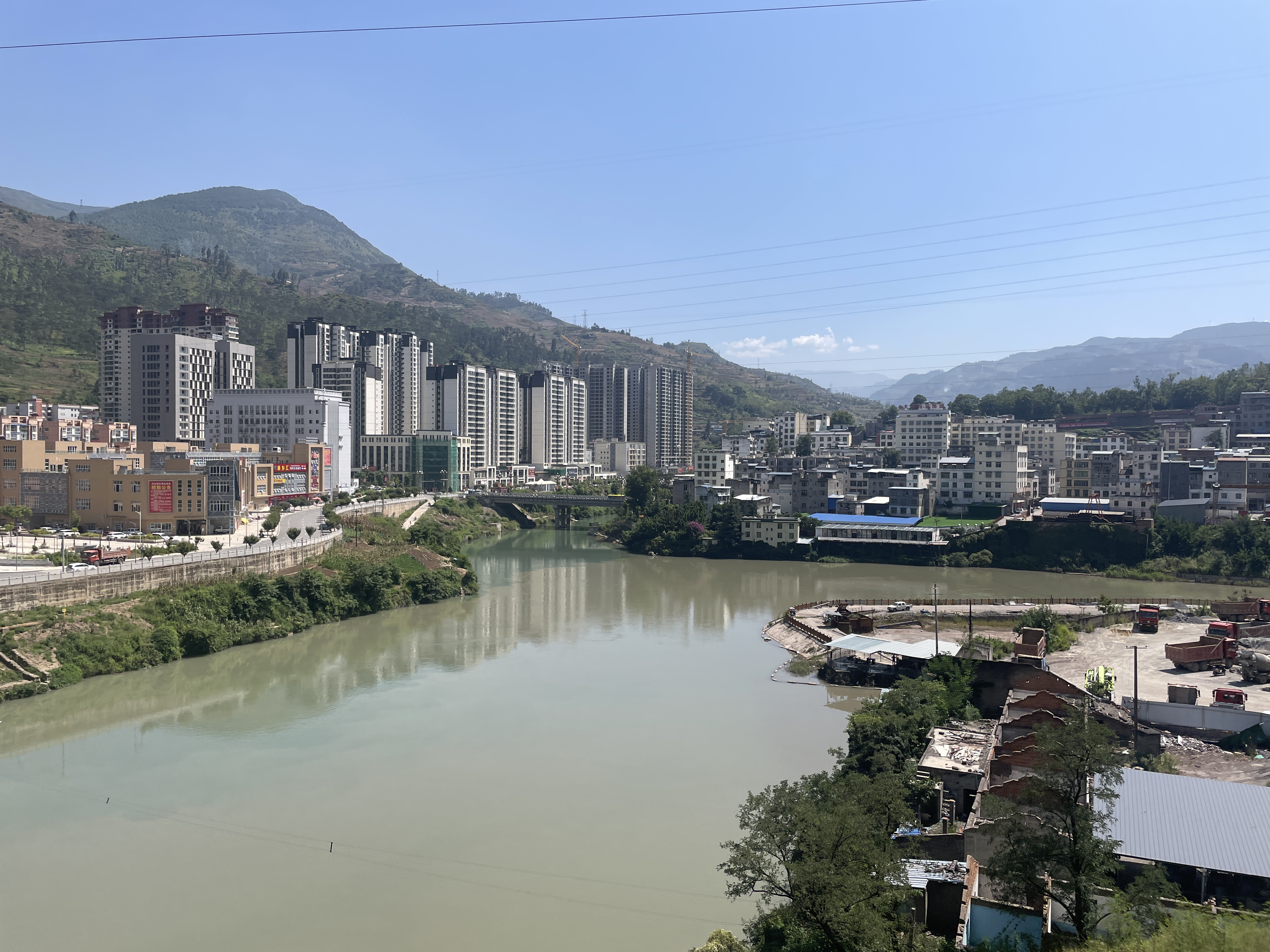
- County seat center

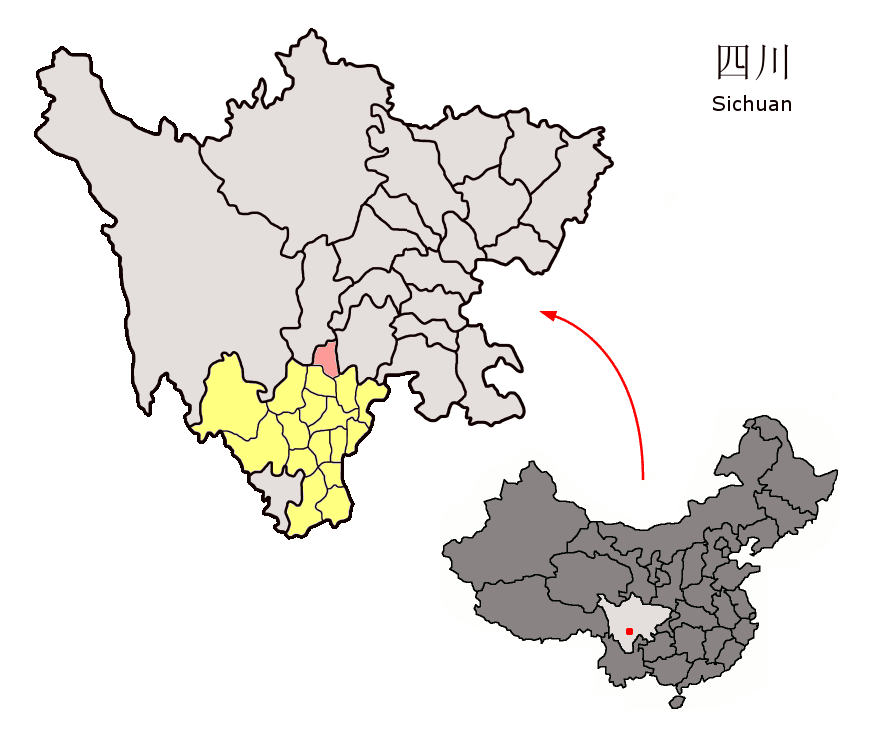
- Location of Ganluo County (pink) and Liangshan Prefecture (yellow) within Sichuan

- Location of the seat in Sichuan Ganluo (China)
- Coordinates: 29°01′08″N 102°42′43″E
- Country: China
- Province: Sichuan
- Autonomous prefecture: Liangshan
- County seat: Xinshiba

Area
  - Total: 2,156 km^{2} (832 sq mi)

Population (2020)
  - Total: 205,991
  - Density: 95.54/km^{2} (247.5/sq mi)
- Time zone: UTC+8 (China Standard)
- Website: www.ganluo.gov.cn

Ganluo County

Chinese name
- Simplified Chinese: 甘洛县
- Traditional Chinese: 甘洛縣
Transcriptions
Standard Mandarin
- Hanyu Pinyin: Gānluò Xiàn

Yi name
- Yi: ꇤꇉꑤ; Romanisation: ga lo xiep

Ganluo County (Chinese: 甘洛县; Yi: ꇤꇉꑤ) is a county of Sichuan Province, China. It is under the administration of the Liangshan Yi Autonomous Prefecture.

== Administrative divisions ==
Ganluo County administers the following 9 towns and 4 townships:

Name	Simplified Chinese	Hanyu Pinyin	Yi	Romanized Yi	Administrative division code
Towns
Xinshiba Town	新市坝镇	Xīnshìbà Zhèn	ꑝꏃꀡꍔ	xit shyp bap zhep	513435100
Tianba Town	田坝镇	Tiánbà Zhèn	ꄠꀡꍔ	tiep bap zhep	5134351001
Haitang Town	海棠镇	Hǎitáng Zhèn	ꉰꄤꍔ	hie tap zhep	5134351002
Jimi Town	吉米镇	Jímǐ Zhèn	ꐛꃆꍔ	jjip mup zhep	5134351003
Sijue Town	斯觉镇	Sījué Zhèn	ꌩꐦꍔ	syr jjop zhep	5134351004
Puchang Town	普昌镇	Pǔchāng Zhèn	ꁋꍣꍔ	pux cha zhep	5134351005
Yutian Town	玉田镇	Yùtián Zhèn	ꒄꄠꍔ	yup tiep zhep	5134351006
Wushudaqiao Town	乌史大桥镇	Wūshǐdàqiáo Zhèn	ꃶꏂꄊꐇꍔ	vu shy dap quop zhep	5134351007
Suxiong Town	苏雄镇	Sūxióng Zhèn	ꌠꑪꍔ	su xop zhep	5134351008
Townships
Xincha Township	新茶乡	Xīnchá Xiāng	ꑝꍤꑣ	xit chap xie	513435202
Tuanjie Township	团结乡	Tuánjié Xiāng	ꏦꌝꑣ	jie sep xie	513435211
Gari Township	嘎日乡	Gārì Xiāng	ꇤꏝꑣ	ga ryp xie	513435212
Shadai Township	沙岱乡	Shādài Xiāng	ꎸꄸꑣ	she ddi xie	513435219

== Climate ==
Climate data for Ganluo, elevation 1,060 m (3,480 ft), (1991–2020 normals, extremes 1981–2010)
Month	Jan	Feb	Mar	Apr	May	Jun	Jul	Aug	Sep	Oct	Nov	Dec	Year
Record high °C (°F)	21.2 (70.2)	33.2 (91.8)	37.1 (98.8)	38.2 (100.8)	39.9 (103.8)	36.3 (97.3)	37.6 (99.7)	40.4 (104.7)	39.8 (103.6)	32.9 (91.2)	27.3 (81.1)	21.6 (70.9)	40.4 (104.7)
Mean daily maximum °C (°F)	12.6 (54.7)	16.1 (61.0)	20.6 (69.1)	25.3 (77.5)	27.2 (81.0)	28.1 (82.6)	30.8 (87.4)	31.0 (87.8)	26.8 (80.2)	21.9 (71.4)	18.5 (65.3)	13.5 (56.3)	22.7 (72.9)
Daily mean °C (°F)	7.4 (45.3)	9.9 (49.8)	13.7 (56.7)	18.1 (64.6)	20.8 (69.4)	22.5 (72.5)	24.5 (76.1)	24.4 (75.9)	21.4 (70.5)	17.2 (63.0)	13.4 (56.1)	8.7 (47.7)	16.8 (62.3)
Mean daily minimum °C (°F)	3.7 (38.7)	5.6 (42.1)	9.2 (48.6)	13.3 (55.9)	16.5 (61.7)	18.9 (66.0)	20.5 (68.9)	20.3 (68.5)	17.9 (64.2)	14.3 (57.7)	10.0 (50.0)	5.3 (41.5)	13.0 (55.3)
Record low °C (°F)	−4.5 (23.9)	−3.7 (25.3)	−1.4 (29.5)	4.1 (39.4)	7.5 (45.5)	11.6 (52.9)	14.5 (58.1)	13.5 (56.3)	10.0 (50.0)	3.8 (38.8)	0.2 (32.4)	−3.5 (25.7)	−4.5 (23.9)
Average precipitation mm (inches)	2.8 (0.11)	6.1 (0.24)	35.0 (1.38)	67.4 (2.65)	122.6 (4.83)	176.2 (6.94)	185.0 (7.28)	170.5 (6.71)	122.9 (4.84)	64.8 (2.55)	18.1 (0.71)	2.6 (0.10)	974 (38.34)
Average precipitation days (≥ 0.1 mm)	2.1	3.7	10.1	13.8	17.0	21.3	18.7	17.3	17.3	15.5	6.1	2.6	145.5
Average snowy days	0.8	0.6	0	0	0	0	0	0	0	0	0	0.2	1.6
Average relative humidity (%)	57	55	57	60	66	75	76	75	75	74	67	61	67
Mean monthly sunshine hours	108.3	123.9	144.8	155.5	137.4	98.3	139.3	151.6	98.3	81.7	107.8	93.8	1,440.7
Percentage possible sunshine	33	39	39	40	32	24	33	37	27	23	34	29	33
Source: China Meteorological Administration
