= Jinyang County =

Jinyang County 金阳县 • ꏠꑸꑤ
- County
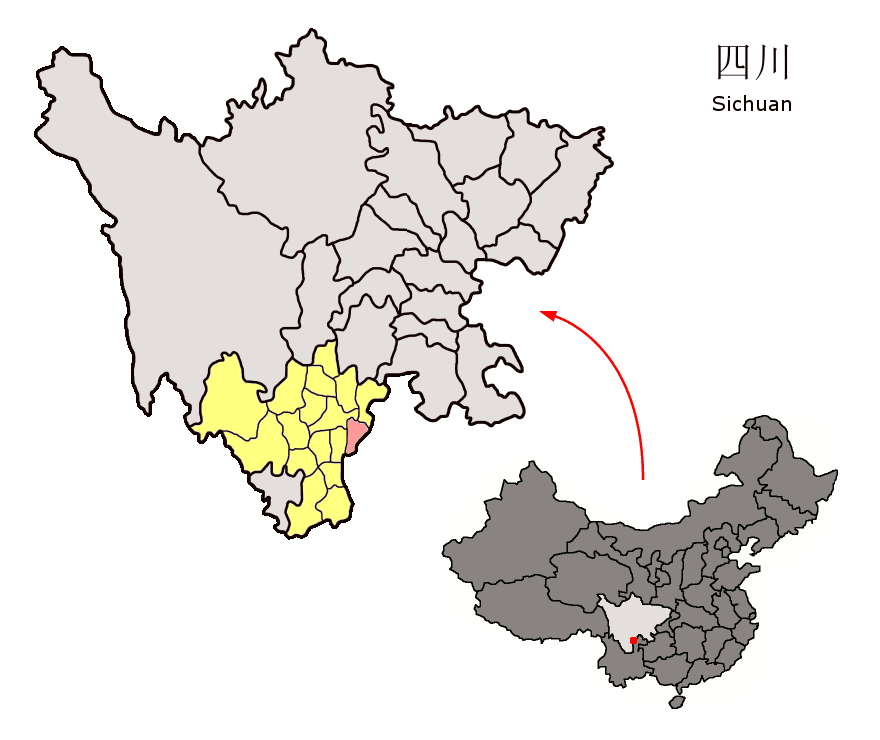
- Location of Jinyang County (pink) and Liangshan Prefecture (yellow) within Sichuan

- Location of the seat in Sichuan Jinyang (China)
- Coordinates: 27.697°N 103.249°E
- Country: China
- Province: Sichuan
- Autonomous prefecture: Liangshan
- County seat: Tiandiba

Area
  - Total: 1,587 km^{2} (613 sq mi)

Population (2020)
  - Total: 170,063
  - Density: 107.2/km^{2} (277.5/sq mi)
- Time zone: UTC+8 (China Standard)
- Website: www.jinyang.gov.cn

Jinyang County

Chinese name
- Simplified Chinese: 金阳县
- Traditional Chinese: 金陽縣
Transcriptions
Standard Mandarin
- Hanyu Pinyin: Jīnyáng Xiàn

Yi name
- Yi: ꏠꑸꑤ; Romanisation: jit yiep xiep

Jinyang County (Chinese: 金阳县; Yi: ꏠꑸꑤ) is a county of Sichuan Province, China. It is under the administration of the Liangshan Yi Autonomous Prefecture.

== Administrative divisions ==
Jinyang County comprises 9 towns and 6 townships.

Name	Simplified Chinese	Hanyu Pinyin	Yi	Romanized Yi	Administrative division code
Towns
Tiandiba Town	天地坝镇	Tiāndìbà Zhèn	ꄟꄃꀡꍔ	tie dip bap zhep	513430100
Pailai Town	派来镇	Pàilái Zhèn	ꀸꅽꍔ	pit nit zhep	513430101
Lugao Town	芦稿镇	Lúgǎo Zhèn	ꇑꇨꍔ	lup guo zhep	513430102
Duiping Town	对坪镇	Duìpíng Zhèn	ꄐꀻꍔ	dop pip zhep	513430103
Nanwa Town	南瓦镇	Nánwǎ Zhèn	ꇂꃬꍔ	lap va zhep	513430104
Baicaopo Town	百草坡镇	Bǎicǎopō Zhèn	ꀙꊻꁈꍔ	bip cuo po zhep	513430105
Luojue Town	洛觉镇	Luòjué Zhèn	ꇅꐦꍔ	luo jjop zhep	513430106
Dexi Town	德溪镇	Déxī Zhèn	ꄆꐔꍔ	diep qy zhep	513430107
Bingdi Town	丙底镇	Bǐngdǐ Zhèn	ꀘꅓꍔ	bi ndi zhep	513430108
Townships
Reshuihe Township	热水河乡	Rèshuǐhé Xiāng			513430201
Jiayi Township	甲依乡	Jiǎyī Xiāng	ꏦꒉꑣ	jie yy xie	513430206
Jijue Township	基觉乡	Jījué Xiāng	ꏸꐦꑣ	jy jjop xie	513430210
Xiaoyinmu Township	小银木乡	Xiǎoyínmù Xiāng	ꑦꑾꃅꑣ	xuo yox mu xie	513430211
Qingsong Township	青松乡	Qīngsōng Xiāng	ꏼꌗꑣ	qit sot xie	513430214
Shanjiang Township	山江乡	Shānjiāng Xiāng	ꎭꏦꑣ	sha jie xie	513430217

== Climate ==
Climate data for Jinyang, elevation 1,093 m (3,586 ft), (1991–2020 normals, extremes 1981–2010)
Month	Jan	Feb	Mar	Apr	May	Jun	Jul	Aug	Sep	Oct	Nov	Dec	Year
Mean daily maximum °C (°F)	13.3 (55.9)	17.9 (64.2)	22.8 (73.0)	26.5 (79.7)	29.3 (84.7)	28.8 (83.8)	30.8 (87.4)	30.8 (87.4)	26.9 (80.4)	22.5 (72.5)	19.5 (67.1)	14.1 (57.4)	23.6 (74.5)
Daily mean °C (°F)	8.2 (46.8)	11.2 (52.2)	15.7 (60.3)	19.5 (67.1)	22.5 (72.5)	23.2 (73.8)	24.8 (76.6)	24.7 (76.5)	21.7 (71.1)	17.7 (63.9)	14.0 (57.2)	9.5 (49.1)	17.7 (63.9)
Mean daily minimum °C (°F)	5.2 (41.4)	7.1 (44.8)	11.2 (52.2)	14.9 (58.8)	18.1 (64.6)	19.7 (67.5)	21.0 (69.8)	20.9 (69.6)	18.6 (65.5)	15.0 (59.0)	11.0 (51.8)	6.8 (44.2)	14.1 (57.4)
Average precipitation mm (inches)	5.7 (0.22)	5.5 (0.22)	18.4 (0.72)	34.1 (1.34)	68.6 (2.70)	151.7 (5.97)	176.6 (6.95)	123.8 (4.87)	102.7 (4.04)	49.2 (1.94)	9.6 (0.38)	2.7 (0.11)	748.6 (29.46)
Average precipitation days (≥ 0.1 mm)	3.2	2.4	7.4	9.7	11.1	17.5	15.9	14.4	14.3	12.1	3.4	1.8	113.2
Average snowy days	1.2	0.3	0	0	0	0	0	0	0	0	0	0.1	1.6
Average relative humidity (%)	60	53	52	55	58	72	73	71	76	76	67	63	65
Mean monthly sunshine hours	104.7	133.9	162.8	157.1	150.1	103.1	143.3	153.0	102.9	88.3	110.8	90.9	1,500.9
Percentage possible sunshine	32	42	44	41	36	25	34	38	28	25	35	28	34
Source: China Meteorological Administration

Climate data for Jinyang, elevation 1,452 m (4,764 ft), (1981–2010 normals)
Month	Jan	Feb	Mar	Apr	May	Jun	Jul	Aug	Sep	Oct	Nov	Dec	Year
Record high °C (°F)	24.6 (76.3)	28.1 (82.6)	32.7 (90.9)	35.4 (95.7)	38.0 (100.4)	37.4 (99.3)	35.6 (96.1)	36.2 (97.2)	37.1 (98.8)	31.3 (88.3)	27.4 (81.3)	23.0 (73.4)	38.0 (100.4)
Mean daily maximum °C (°F)	11.1 (52.0)	13.8 (56.8)	19.0 (66.2)	24.1 (75.4)	26.1 (79.0)	26.4 (79.5)	28.0 (82.4)	28.1 (82.6)	24.2 (75.6)	19.7 (67.5)	16.7 (62.1)	12.0 (53.6)	20.8 (69.4)
Daily mean °C (°F)	6.6 (43.9)	8.6 (47.5)	12.8 (55.0)	17.7 (63.9)	20.5 (68.9)	21.8 (71.2)	23.4 (74.1)	23.3 (73.9)	19.9 (67.8)	15.8 (60.4)	12.3 (54.1)	7.8 (46.0)	15.9 (60.6)
Mean daily minimum °C (°F)	3.9 (39.0)	5.4 (41.7)	8.8 (47.8)	13.4 (56.1)	16.5 (61.7)	18.5 (65.3)	20.1 (68.2)	19.8 (67.6)	17.0 (62.6)	13.4 (56.1)	9.8 (49.6)	5.3 (41.5)	12.7 (54.8)
Record low °C (°F)	−3.1 (26.4)	−2.8 (27.0)	−1.3 (29.7)	3.5 (38.3)	6.0 (42.8)	11.9 (53.4)	13.7 (56.7)	14.3 (57.7)	9.6 (49.3)	5.0 (41.0)	−0.1 (31.8)	−3.8 (25.2)	−3.8 (25.2)
Average precipitation mm (inches)	6.0 (0.24)	9.2 (0.36)	18.5 (0.73)	34.4 (1.35)	80.7 (3.18)	151.7 (5.97)	178.3 (7.02)	133.6 (5.26)	107.9 (4.25)	54.2 (2.13)	15.7 (0.62)	4.8 (0.19)	795 (31.3)
Average relative humidity (%)	66	63	60	59	64	75	78	75	80	79	73	69	70
Source: China Meteorological Data Service Center
