= Xinshiba =

Township in China

Xinshiba 新市坝镇
- Town
- Location in Sichuan
- Coordinates: 28°58′43″N 102°46′32″E
- Country: People's Republic of China
- Province: Sichuan
- Autonomous prefecture: Liangshan Yi Autonomous Prefecture
- County: Ganluo County

Area
  - Total: 203.7 km^{2} (78.6 sq mi)

Population (2019)
  - Total: 45,164
  - Density: 221.7/km^{2} (574.2/sq mi)
- Time zone: UTC+8 (China Standard)
- Postal code: 616850

Xinshiba (Chinese: 新市坝; pinyin: Xīnshíbà) is a town in Ganluo County, Sichuan Province, China. In June 2020, Like Township, Aer Township, and Shihai Township were abolished, and the former administrative areas of Like Township, Tie'er'mo Village, and Xixiga Village were placed under the jurisdiction of Xinshiba.

== Administrative divisions ==
As of 2022, Xinshiba administers the following 5 residential communities and 18 villages:

- Chengbei Residential Community (Chinese: 城北社区)
- Chengnan Residential Community (Chinese: 城南社区)
- Chengxi Residential Community (Chinese: 城西社区)
- Chengdong Residential Community (Chinese: 城东社区)
- Hedong Residential Community (Chinese: 河东社区)
- Xinmin Village (Chinese: 新民村)
- Erjue Village (Chinese: 尔觉村)
- Ajiayi Village (Chinese: 阿加衣村)
- Muguzu Village (Chinese: 木古足村)
- La'er Village (Chinese: 拉尔村)
- Zegou Village (Chinese: 则沟村)
- Luge Village (Chinese: 鲁格村)
- Yizhi Village (Chinese: 依知村)
- Liugu Village (Chinese: 柳姑村)
- Jiagu Village (Chinese: 甲古村)
- Houyupu Village (Chinese: 候玉普村)
- Teji Village (Chinese: 特吉村)
- Yimin New Village (Chinese: 移民新村)
- Xixiga Village (Chinese: 西西呷村)
- Jushen Village (Chinese: 居什村)
- Bala Village (Chinese: 巴拉村)
- Naituo Village (Chinese: 乃托村)
- Yanrun'afa Village (Chinese: 岩润阿发村)
