= Luojishan =

Luojishan 螺髻山镇
- Town
- Location within Sichuan
- Coordinates: 27°35′02″N 102°25′57″E
- Country: China
- Province: Sichuan
- Autonomous prefecture: Liangshan Yi Autonomous Prefecture
- County: Puge County
- Elevation: 1,973 m (6,473 ft)
- Time zone: UTC+8 (China Standard)
- Postal code: 513428102
- Area code: 0558

Luojishan (Chinese: 螺髻山; pinyin: Luójìshān) is a town in southern Sichuan province, Southwest China. It is under the administration of Puge County, Liangshan Yi Autonomous Prefecture. As of 2020, it administers Luojishan Residential Community and the following seven villages:

- Deyu Village (德育村)
- Huangcaoping Village (黄草坪村)
- Luobo Village (洛博村)
- Machangping Village (马厂坪村)
- Zire Village (子热村)
- Boluoping Village (波洛坪村)
- Xiaocaohe Village (小槽河村)

== See also ==
- List of township-level divisions of Sichuan
