= Xining, Leibo County =

Xining 西宁镇
- Town
- Location in Sichuan
- Coordinates: 28°30′47″N 103°36′30″E
- Country: People's Republic of China
- Province: Sichuan
- Autonomous prefecture: Liangshan Yi Autonomous Prefecture
- County: Leibo County
- Time zone: UTC+8 (China Standard)

Xining (Chinese: 西宁; pinyin: Xīníng) is a town under the administration of Leibo County, Sichuan, China. As of 2020, it administers the following three residential communities and 14 villages:

Neighborhoods

- Xining Community
- Leimaping Tea Plantation Community (雷马屏茶场社区)
- Leibo Forestry Bureau Community (雷波林业局社区)

Villages

- Xining Village
- Lijiaping Village (李家坪村)
- Tongmuxi Village (通木溪村)
- Tuan'erbu Village (团儿堡村)
- Shichangwan Village (石厂湾村)
- Shashaping Village (沙沙坪村)
- Shiziyan Village (狮子岩村)
- Yinchanggou Village (银厂沟村)
- Da'ao Village (大坳村)
- Guanghui Village (光辉村)
- Shatuo Village (沙沱村)
- Fuzi Village (甫子村)
- Tuotian Village (沱田村)
- Zhaojiashan Village (赵家山村)
