= Haitang, Ganluo County =

Haitang 海棠镇
- Town
- Location in Sichuan
- Coordinates: 29°2′18″N 102°33′16″E
- Country: People's Republic of China
- Province: Sichuan
- Autonomous prefecture: Liangshan Yi Autonomous Prefecture
- County: Ganluo County
- Time zone: UTC+8 (China Standard)

Haitang (Chinese: 海棠; pinyin: Hǎitáng) is a town in Ganluo County, Sichuan Province, China. As of 2020, it administers the following 24 villages:

- Haitang Village
- Dongmen Village (东门村)
- Zhengxi Village (正西村)
- Xiqiao Village (西桥村)
- Daqiao Village (大桥村)
- Xujiashan Village (徐家山村)
- Tangjiawan Village (唐家湾村)
- Pingba Village (坪坝村)
- Shishi'er Village (石十儿村)
- Shuangmacao Village (双马槽村)
- Yaochang Village (窑厂村)
- Sanpiyan Village (三匹岩村)
- Songshu Village (松树村)
- Baluo Village (巴洛村)
- Sanshihu Village (三十户村)
- Huangshuitang Village (黄水塘村)
- Linzi Village (林子村)
- Lamei Village (腊梅村)
- Daganyi Village (达杆依村)
- Lapu Village (拉埔村)
- Liaoping Village (蓼坪村)
- Xiaohe Village (小河村)
- Ladai Village (腊岱村)
- Qingshui Village (清水村)
