= Ridudisa Town =

Yushui Township 雨水乡
- Township
- Location in Sichuan
- Coordinates: 27°29′8″N 102°36′48″E
- Country: People's Republic of China
- Province: Sichuan
- Autonomous prefecture: Liangshan Yi Autonomous Prefecture
- County: Puge County
- Time zone: UTC+8 (China Standard)

Yushui Township (simplified Chinese: 雨水乡; traditional Chinese: 雨水鄉; pinyin: Yǔshuǐ Xiāng) is a township under the administration of Puge County, Sichuan, China. As of 2018, it has eight villages under its administration.
