= Nuosu language =

Prestige language of the Yi people

Nuosu
- Northern Yi, Liangshan Yi, Sichuan Yi
- ꆈꌠꉙ Nuosuhxop
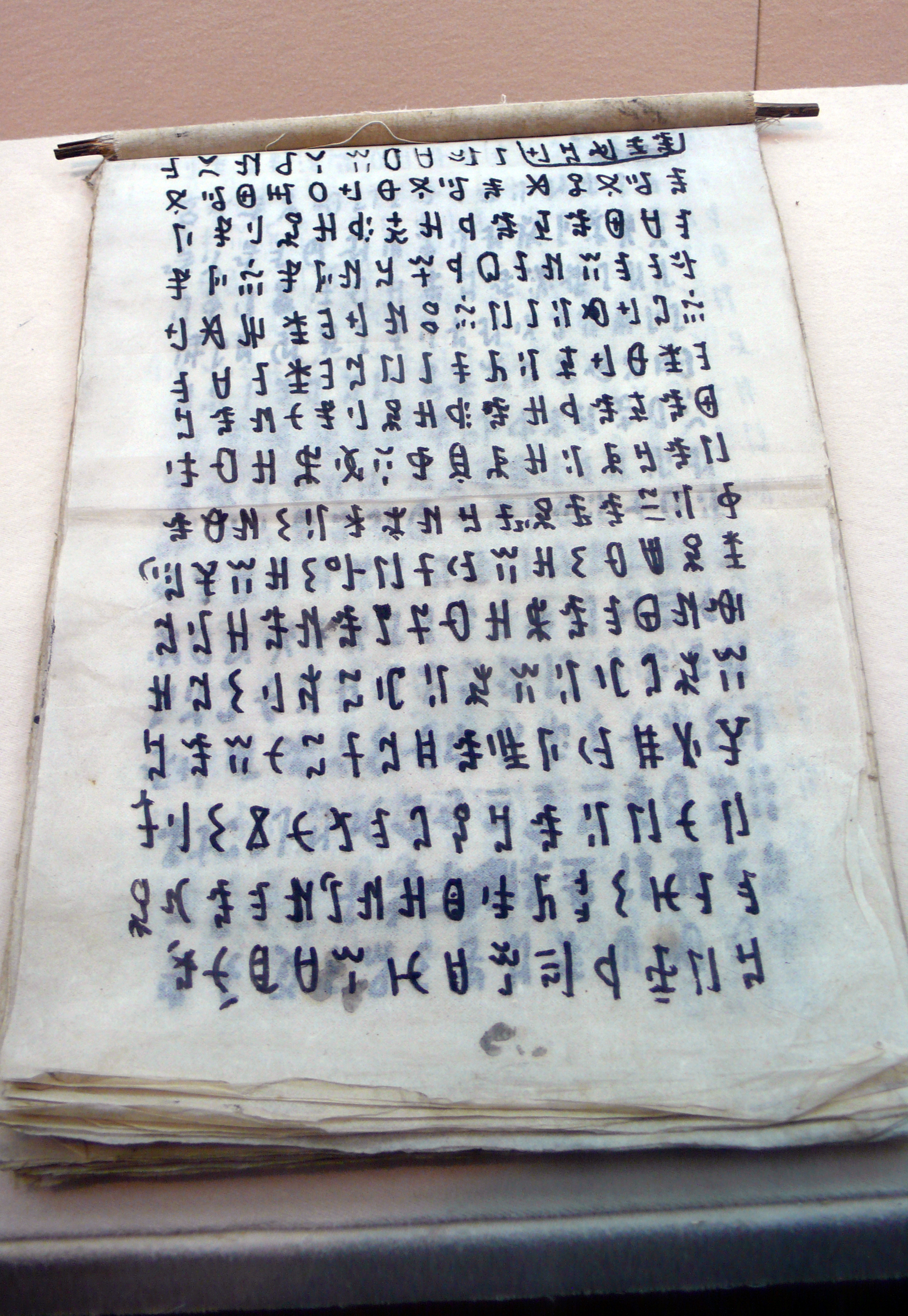
- Native to: China
- Region: Southern Sichuan, northern Yunnan
- Ethnicity: Yi
- Native speakers: (2 million cited 2000 census)
- Language family: Sino-Tibetan: Tibeto-Burman; Lolo–Burmese; Loloish; Nisoish; Nisoid; Nuosu
- Standard forms: Liangshan (Cool Mountain) dialect
- Writing system: Yi syllabary, formerly Yi logograms

Official status
- Recognised minority language in: China (Yunnan province)

Language codes
- ISO 639-1: ii Sichuan Yi, Nuosu
- ISO 639-2: iii Sichuan Yi, Nuosu
- ISO 639-3: iii Nuosu, Sichuan Yi
- Glottolog: sich1238 Sichuan Yi
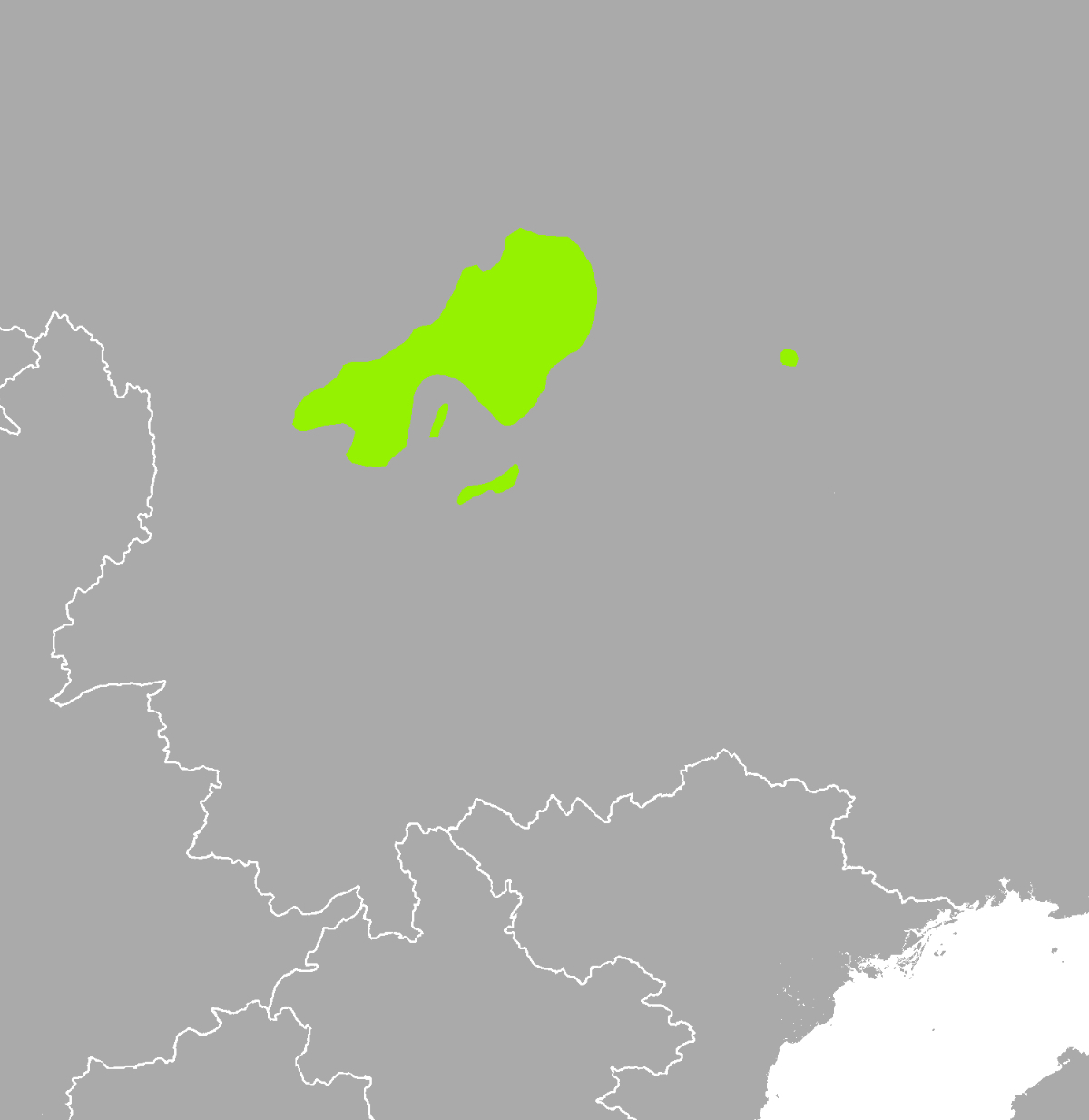

Nuosu or Nosu (ꆈꌠꉙ written in Yi script, transliterated as Nuo su hxop; in traditional script), also known as Northern Yi, Liangshan Yi, and Sichuan Yi, is the prestige language of the Yi people; it has been chosen by the Chinese government as the standard Yi language (Chinese: 彝语) and as such is the only one taught in schools in both oral and written forms. It is spoken by two million people and is increasing (as of PRC census); 60% were monolingual (1994 estimate). Nuosu is the native endonym for the language and is not used in Mandarin Chinese, though it may sometimes be translated as Nuòsūyǔ (simplified Chinese: 诺苏语; traditional Chinese: 諾蘇語).

The occasional terms 'Black Yi' (黑彝; hēi Yí) and 'White Yi' (白彝; bái Yí) are castes of the Nuosu people, not dialects.

Nuosu is one of several often mutually unintelligible varieties known as Yi, Lolo, Moso, or Noso. The six Yi languages recognized by the Chinese government have only 25% to 50% of their vocabulary in common. They share a common traditional writing system, but that is used for shamanism, rather than daily accounting.

According to the Encyclopedia Britannica, it is one of the eight Tibeto-Burman languages with over 1,000,000 speakers (others being Burmese, Tibetan, Meitei, Bai, Karen, Hani, Jingpo).

== Distribution ==
Nuosu is mainly spoken in the Liangshan Yi Autonomous Prefecture, Sichuan.

There are other parts of Sichuan where Yi is spoken, including Panzhihua and Leshan.

In Yunnan, Northern Yi (Nuosu) is spoken in the north.

== Dialects ==
=== Lama (2012) ===
Lama (2012) gives the following classification for Nuosu dialects.

- Nuosu
  - Qumusu (Tianba)
  - Nuosu proper
    - Nuosu
      - Muhisu
      - Nuosu (nɔ³³su³³)
        - Yinuo
        - Shengzha
    - Niesu (nie³³su³³)
      - Suondi
      - Adu

The Qumusu (曲木苏, Tianba 田坝) dialect is the most divergent one. The other dialects group as Niesu (聂苏, Suondi and Adu) and as Nuosu proper (Muhisu 米西苏, Yinuo 义诺, and Shengzha 圣乍). Niesu has both lost voiceless nasals and developed diphthongs.

Adu (阿都话), characterized by its labial–velar consonants, is spoken in the Butuo and Ningnan counties of Liangshan Yi Autonomous Prefecture, Sichuan province, and also in parts of Puge, Zhaojue, Dechang, and Jinyang counties.

Nyisu or Yellow Yi (黄彝) of Fumin County, Yunnan may either be a Soundi Yi (Nuosu) dialect or Nisu dialect.

Zhu and Zhang (2005) reports that the Shuitian people (水田人) reside mostly in the lowlands of the Anning River drainage basin, in Xichang, Xide, and Mianning counties of Liangshan Prefecture in Sichuan. They are called Muhisu (mu33 hi44 su33) by the neighboring Yi highland people. Shuitian is spoken in the following locations. Shuitian belongs to the Shengzha dialect (圣乍次土语) of Northern Yi.

- Mianning County: Jionglong 迥龙, Lugu 泸沽, Hebian 河边; Manshuiwan 漫水湾
- Xichang: Lizhou 礼州, Yuehua 月华
- Xide County: Mianshan 冕山镇 (including Shitoushan Village 石头山村), Lake 拉克

=== Bradley (1997) ===
According to Bradley (1997), there are three main dialects of Nosu, of which the Southeastern one (Sondi) is most divergent.

- Northern
  - Tianba 田坝 a.k.a. Northwestern
  - Yinuo 义诺 a.k.a. Northeastern
- Central (Shengzha 圣乍)
- Southeastern (Sondi)
  - Sondi
  - Adur

=== Chen (2010) ===
Chen (2010) lists the following dialects of Nosu. Also listed are the counties where each respective dialect is spoken.

- Nosu 诺苏方言
  - Senza, Shèngzhà 圣乍次方言
    - Senza, Shèngzhà 圣乍 (no̠33 su33): 1,200,000 speakers primarily in Xide, Yuexi, Ganluo, Jinyang, Puge, Leibo, Xichang, Dechang, Mianning, Yanyuan, Yanbian, Muli, Shimian, Jiulong, and Luding; also in Huaping, Yongsheng, Ninglang, Lijiang, Jianchuan, Yongshan, and Qiaojia
    - Yino, Yìnuò 义诺 (no̠22 su22): 600,000 speakers primarily in Meigu, Mabian, Leibo, and Ebian, Ganluo; also in Yuexi, Zhaojue, and Jinyang
    - Lidim, Tiánbà 田坝 (no̠33 su33): 100,000 speakers primarily in Ganluo, Yuexi, and Ebian; also in Hanyuan
  - Sodi, Suǒdì 所地次方言 (no̠33 su33): 600,000 speakers primarily in Tuoxian, Huili, Huidong, Ningnan, Miyi, Dechang, and Puge

== Phonology ==
=== Consonants ===
Consonant phonemes in Nuosu
		Labial	Alveolar		Retroflex	(Alveolo-) Palatal	Velar	Glottal
		Labial	plain	sibilant	Retroflex	(Alveolo-) Palatal	Velar	Glottal
Nasal	voiceless	m̥ ⟨hm⟩	n̥ ⟨hn⟩					
Nasal	voiced	m ⟨m⟩	n ⟨n⟩			ɲ᫈ ⟨ny⟩	ŋ ⟨ng⟩	
Plosive/ Affricate	tenuis	p ⟨b⟩	t ⟨d⟩	ts ⟨z⟩	ʈʂ ⟨zh⟩	tɕ ⟨j⟩	k ⟨g⟩	
Plosive/ Affricate	aspirated	pʰ ⟨p⟩	tʰ ⟨t⟩	tsʰ ⟨c⟩	ʈʂʰ ⟨ch⟩	tɕʰ ⟨q⟩	kʰ ⟨k⟩	
Plosive/ Affricate	voiced	b ⟨bb⟩	d ⟨dd⟩	dz ⟨zz⟩	ɖʐ ⟨rr⟩	dʑ ⟨jj⟩	ɡ ⟨gg⟩	
Plosive/ Affricate	prenasal	ᵐb ⟨nb⟩	ⁿd ⟨nd⟩	ⁿdz ⟨nz⟩	ᶯɖʐ ⟨nr⟩	ᶮdʑ ⟨nj⟩	ᵑɡ ⟨mg⟩	
Continuant	voiceless	f ⟨f⟩	ɬ ⟨hl⟩	s ⟨s⟩	ʂ ⟨sh⟩	ɕ ⟨x⟩	x ⟨h⟩	h ⟨hx⟩
Continuant	voiced	v ⟨v⟩	l ⟨l⟩	z ⟨ss⟩	ʐ ⟨r⟩	ʑ ⟨y⟩	ɣ ⟨w⟩	

Gerner (2013) and Edmondson, Esling & Ziwo (2017) use the Sinological symbol /ȵ/ to transcribe the alveolo-palatal nasal.

Eatough (1997)'s chart and transcriptions slightly differ from the later sources:

- The retroflex fricatives and affricates are notated as plain postalveolar (i.e. with /ʃ ʒ/ instead of /ʂ ʐ/)
- The alveolo-palatal series is notated as palatalized (post)alveolar (i.e. with /ʃʲ ʒʲ nʲ/ instead of /ɕ ʑ ȵ/)
- The alveolo-palatal (palatalized) nasal includes a voiceless pairing in concordance with the alveolar nasals (i.e. with /n̥ʲ/ in addition to /n n̥ nʲ/)

Eatough (1997) and Gerner (2013) transcribe the voiceless lateral as an approximant /l̥/, while Edmondson, Esling & Ziwo (2017) transcribe it as a fricative /ɬ/. See § Assimilation for descriptions of syllabic realizations of the laterals.

Gerner (2013) segments the bilabial trill [ʙ] as an allophone of the following set of consonants before the vowel phonemes /u u/, while Eatough (1997) and Edmondson, Esling & Ziwo (2017) segment it as a syllabic realization of the same vowels (see § Fricativized vowels):

- [ʙ] as an allophone of /b/
- [ᵐʙ] as an allophone of /ᵐb/
- [dʙ] and [tʙ] as allophones of /d/
- [ⁿdʙ] as an allophone of /ⁿd/

=== Vowels ===
==== Eatough (1997) ====
Vowel phonemes according to Eatough (1997)
		Front	Non-front	
		Front	unrounded	rounded
Close (fricative)	loose		/i/	/u/
Close (fricative)	tight		/i/	/u/
Close-mid	loose	/e/	/a/	/o/
Open-mid	tight	/e/		/o/
Open	tight		/a/	

Vowel phones according to Eatough (1997)
		Front	Non-front	
		Front	unrounded	rounded
Close (fricative)	loose		[z̩]	[v̩ʷ]
Close (fricative)	tight		[z̍]	[v̍ʷ]
Close-mid	loose	[e]	[ɤ]	[o]
Open-mid	tight	[ɛ]		[ɔ]
Open	tight		[a]	

==== Gerner (2013) ====
Vowels according to Gerner (2013) No phoneme–phone distinction; vowels are only presented alongside romanizations, which are shown here in angle brackets.
	Front	Central		Back	
	Front	unrounded	rounded	unrounded	rounded
Close	i ⟨i⟩	ɨ ⟨y⟩		ɯ ⟨e⟩	u ⟨u⟩
Close-mid					o ⟨o⟩
Open-mid	ɛ ⟨ie⟩				ɔ ⟨uo⟩
Open			ɒ̈ ⟨a⟩		

==== Edmondson, Esling & Ziwo (2017) ====
Vowel phonemes according to Edmondson, Esling & Ziwo (2017)
		(Near-)Front	Central	(Near-)Back
Close	lax	/i/	/z/	
Near-close	lax	/i/	/ɯ/	/u/
Near-close	tense		/z/	/u/
Close-mid	lax			/o/
Open-mid	tense	/ɛ (i)/		/ɔ (o)/
Open	tense		/a (ɯ)/	

Vowel phones according to Edmondson, Esling & Ziwo (2017)
		(Near-)Front	Central	(Near-)Back
Close	lax	[i̠]	[z̞]	
Near-close	lax	[i̠]	[ɯ̽]	[v͡ʊ]
Near-close	tense		[z̞᫡]	[v̙͡ɵ̙]
Close-mid	lax			[o̟]
Open-mid	tense	[ɛ̙᫢]		[ɔ̙᫈]
Open	tense		[ä̙]	

==== Phonation ====
Nuosu has five pairs of phonemic vowels, contrasting in a feature Eatough (1997) calls loose throat vs. tight throat, while Edmondson, Esling & Ziwo (2017) call it lax vs. tense; Gerner (2013) simply describes the contrast as with and without laryngealization. Underlining ⟨◌⟩ is used as an ad hoc transcription for tight/tense phonation, used both phonemically and phonetically by Eatough (1997), and phonemically by Edmondson, Esling & Ziwo (2017). Gerner (2013) treats the contrast both phonetically as and with the transcription of creaky voice ⟨◌̰⟩, while Edmondson, Esling & Ziwo (2017) treat it phonetically as laryngeal register and with the transcription of retracted tongue root ⟨◌̙⟩. According to Eatough (1997), vowel quality (height) is a byproduct of loose vs. tight throat, working as a reinforcement; the phonation type is the primary phonemic distinction, rather than the quality. Edmondson, Esling & Ziwo (2017)'s analysis shows this reinforcement likewise extends to the fricativized vowels (syllabic fricatives). According to Gerner (2013) and Walters (2022), a syllable-final ⟨-r⟩ is added in the Nuosu Pinyin orthography to indicate vowels with tense/tight/creaky phonation.

	Description		Transcription	
	Phonemic	Phonetic	Phonemic	Phonetic
Eatough (1997)	loose throat vs. tight throat		◌	
Gerner (2013)	—N/a	noncreaky vs. creaky	—N/a	◌̰
Edmondson, Esling & Ziwo (2017)	lax vs. tense	modal voice vs. raised larynx voice	◌	◌̙

==== Quality ====
Eatough (1997) notes [e ɛ ɤ o ɔ] as sounding slightly closer (higher) than their cardinal values. Edmondson, Esling & Ziwo (2017)'s analysis found this to be true for [ɛ ɔ], while they found [e ɤ] to be much closer (higher) and analyze them instead as more similar to [i ɯ], and found [o] to be slightly more open (lower) than its cardinal value, the opposite of Eatough (1997)'s conjecture.

According to Eatough (1997), the tight throat vowel [ɤ] occurs as a phonetic realization of the phonemically loose throat /a/ (Edmondson, Esling & Ziwo (2017)'s /ɯ/) in the high tone, due to raising of the larynx to produce high pitch; it only occurs in this tone. The loose throat [ɤ] never occurs in this tone, and as such there is no three way contrast known to exist in any tone between [ɤ ɤ a].

According to Edmondson, Esling & Ziwo (2017), vowels are often nasalized after nasal consonants. The tense (tight) vowels often have a schwa offglide [V̙ᵊ̙].

==== Fricativized vowels ====
The fricativized vowels (also called fricative vowels or syllabic fricatives) in Nuosu are the close vowel phonemes:

- unrounded /i i/ or /z z/
- rounded /u u/ or /v v/

The initial fricative elements of the fricativized vowels /u u/ (which Edmondson, Esling & Ziwo (2017) state have also been notated as /v v/) may be voiceless or voiced bilabial trills [ʙ̥, ʙ] after bilabial and alveolar plosives; both the lax and tense variants may be either type of voicing, depending on the context. Eatough (1997) suggests that the realization is more lenis after bilabial plosives, and more fortis after alveolar plosives. The vowel elements may be a range of [u ~ ʊ ~ ɵ ~ ʉ ~ ʏ ~ ø], being fronted especially after alveolo-palatal consonants. The fricative (or trill) elements may occasionally be reduced to offglides [ᶠ, ᵛ, 𐞄̥, 𐞄], or entirely neutralized. Eatough (1997) transcribes this process instead as bilabially trilled onglides while the fricativized vowel retains its form [𐞄vʷ 𐞄vʷ].

The fricativized vowels /z z/ (which Eatough (1997) notates as /i i/) are described by Edmondson, Esling & Ziwo (2017) as 'voiced alveolar fricative syllabic continuants', which are apical and approximated (more open), and with the tongue position between [i] and [ɨ]; they are more accurately transcribed as [z̞ z̞᫡], or with the Sinological symbol [ɿ]. They may also be fronted to [ʏ] or become fully rhotic [ɚ] after alveolo-palatal consonants. The retroflex pair /ʐ ʐ/ are described as retroflex equivalents of this articulation; they are more accurately transcribed as [ʐ̞ ʐ̞᫡], or with the Sinological symbol [ʅ], and also occur as allophones of /z z/ after retroflex consonants. In addition to the assimilated forms described below, Eatough (1997) suggests complementary distribution of [z̍ ~ ʒ̍ ~ ʒ̍ʲ] (or per the later authors' transcriptions [z̍ ~ ʐ̍ ~ ʑ̍]) and equivalent for the tight (tense) form, based on place of articulation of consonant onsets, which is roughly corroborated by Edmondson, Esling & Ziwo (2017) in further detail.

==== Assimilation ====
The fricativized vowels show systematic assimilation to preceding lateral continuants and bilabial nasals, resulting in the formation of syllabic lateral and nasal consonants.

According to Edmondson, Esling & Ziwo (2017), the fricativized vowels may assimilate with the laterals /ɬ l/ to form syllabic lateral–median approximants (roughly [ʪ̞̍, ʫ̞̍] for /z z/ and [ʪ̞̍ʷ, ʫ̞̍ʷ] for /u u/), which they transcribe as [ɬ˞l˞, l˞ː, ɬ˞l˞ʷ, l˞ʷː] to indicate quality between /ɬ, l/ and /ɹ̥, ɹ/; the voicing type is determined by the voicing of the laterals, not by vowel tenseness (tightness), and the combined forms in the case of the voiceless laterals indicates lengthened (geminated) with changing voicing. The initial voiceless onsets may be reduced to [h], resulting in the forms [hl˞ː, hl˞ʷː]. Eatough (1997) shows almost the same process, but treats them as simple laterals [l̥l, l, l̥lʷ, lʷ]. Gerner (2013) provides a similar but narrower analysis, stating only unrounded central [ɨ] assimilates with /l̥, l/ to form syllabic [l̩̊, l̩]. Both Eatough (1997) and Edmondson, Esling & Ziwo (2017) show both lax and tense (loose and tight) forms of the syllabic laterals, while Gerner (2013) does not.

In a similar case as the laterals, all authors show some degree of fricativized vowel assimilation with the bilabial nasals /m̥, m/. Gerner (2013) treats this identically to the laterals; only unrounded central [ɨ] assimilates to form syllabic [m̩̊, m̩]. Eatough (1997) also treats this closely to the laterals, where /u u/ are labialized, and the voiceless variants are lengthened with changing voicing. However, rather than /i i/ forming simple nasals, Eatough (1997) reports them as forming co-articulated nasals and laterals [m͜l]; this results in the forms [m̥m͜l, m͜l, m̥mʷ, mʷ]. Edmondson, Esling & Ziwo (2017) do not include (extra-)labialized forms, but do note the same quality of changing voicing, and still show /u u/ as assimilating under the process just as /i i/ do; this results in the forms [m̥m, mː]. Just as with the laterals, both Eatough (1997) and Edmondson, Esling & Ziwo (2017) show both lax and tense (loose and tight) forms of the syllabic nasals, while Gerner (2013) does not.

Nuosu syllable structure is (C)V.

=== Tones ===
According to Gerner (2013) and Walters (2022), the Nuosu Pinyin orthography indicates tones with the following letters at the end of syllables:

- high [˥] / [V̋] – written ⟨-t⟩
- high-mid [˦] / [V́] or mid falling [˧˨] / [V᷆] – written ⟨-x⟩ (written with the diacritic ⟨◌̑⟩ over symbols in the syllabary)
- mid [˧] / [V̄] – unmarked
- low falling [˨˩] / [V̂] – written ⟨-p⟩

The high-mid tone is only marginally contrastive. Its two main sources are from tone sandhi rules, as the outcome of a mid tone before another mid tone, and the outcome of a low-falling tone after a mid tone. However, these changes do not occur in all compounds where they might: for instance ꊈ wo "bear" + ꃀ mop "mother" regularly forms ꊈꂾ wo mox "female bear", but ꃤ vi "jackal" + ꃀ mop "mother" forms ꃤꃀ vi mop "female jackal" without sandhi. The syntax creates other contrasts: tone sandhi applies across the boundary between object and verb, so is present in SOV clauses like ꃅꏸꇐꄜꎷ mu jy lu ti shex "Mujy looks for Luti", but is absent in OSV clauses like ꃅꏸꇐꄜꎹ mu jy lu ti shep "Luti looks for Mujy". A few words, like ꑞ xix "what?", have underlying high-mid tone.

== Writing system ==
Classic Yi is a syllabic logographic system of 8,000–10,000 glyphs. Although similar to Chinese characters in function, the glyphs are independent in form, with little to suggest a direct relation.

In 1958 the Chinese government had introduced a Roman-based alphabet based on the romanized script of Gladstone Porteous of Sayingpan. This was later replaced by the Modern Yi script.

The Modern Yi script (ꆈꌠꁱꂷ nuosu bburma [nɔ̄sū bʙ̝̄mā] 'Nosu script') is a standardized syllabary derived from the classic script in 1974. It was made the official script of the Yi languages in 1980. There are 756 basic glyphs based on the Liangshan dialect, plus 63 for syllables only found in Chinese borrowings. The government requires the use of the script for signs in some designated public places.

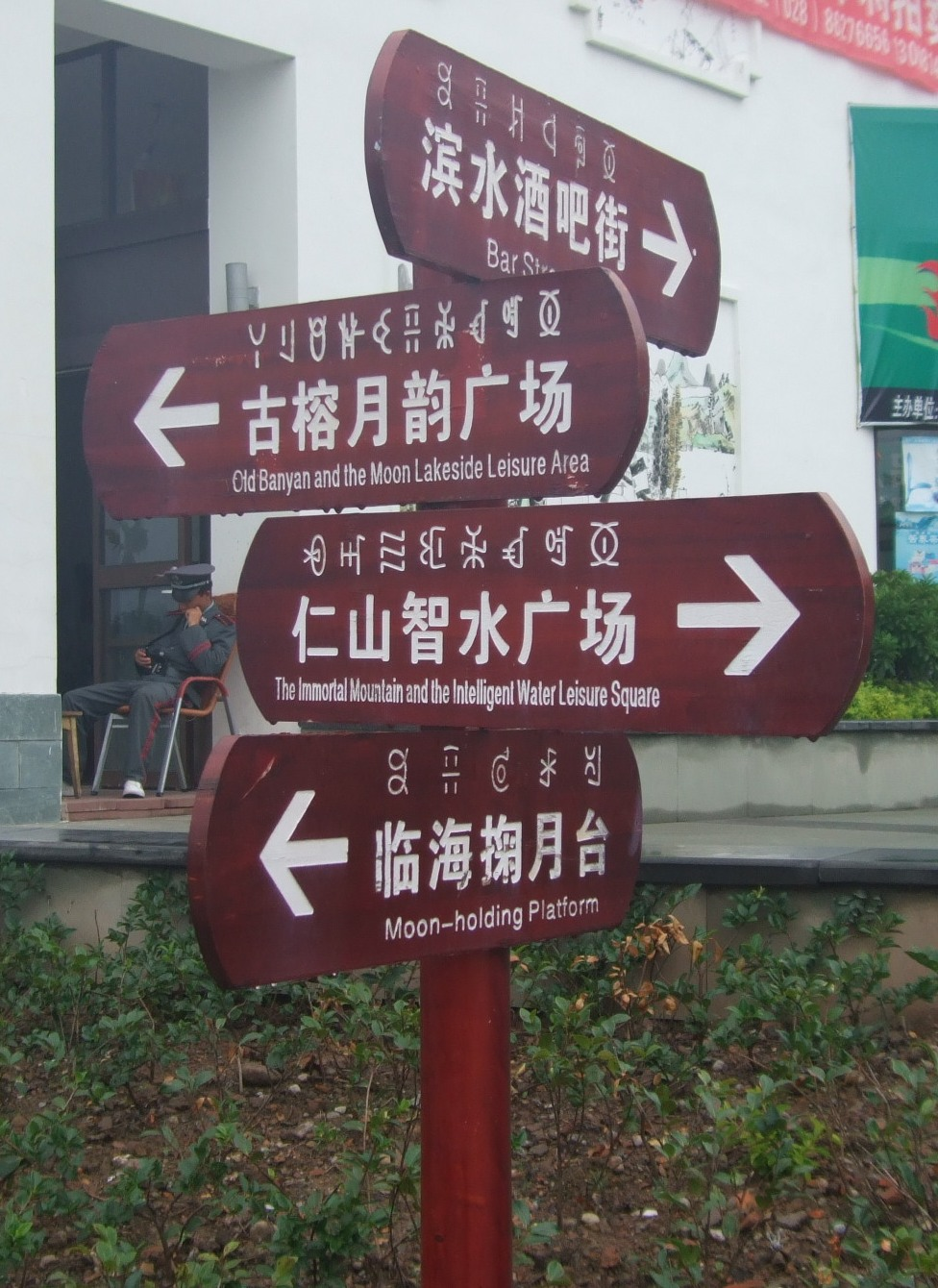
A signpost in a public park in Xichang, Sichuan, China, showing Modern Yi, Chinese and English text.

== Vocabulary and grammar ==
Nuosu is an analytic language. The basic word order is Subject–object–verb. Vocabularies of Nuosu can be divided into content words and function words. Among content words, nouns in Nuosu do not perform inflections for grammatical gender, number, and cases, classifiers are required when the noun is being counted; verbs do not perform conjugations for its persons and tenses; adjectives are usually placed after the word being fixed with a structural particle and do not perform inflections for comparison. Function words, especially grammatical particles, have a significant role in terms of sentence constructions in Nuosu. Nuosu does not have article words, but conjunctions and postposition words are used.

=== Numbers ===
Classifiers are required when numbers are used for fixing nouns.

Number	0	1	2	3	4	5	6	7	8	9	10	11	12
Yi script		ꋍ	ꑍ	ꌕ	ꇖ	ꉬ	ꃘ	ꏃ	ꉆ	ꈬ	ꊰ	ꊰꋍ	ꊰꑋ
IPA		t͡sʰẑ̩	ɲê̝	sɔ̠̄	lz̩̄	ŋɤ̝̄	fv̩̋ʷ	ʂʐ̩̄	he̝̋	ɡv̩̄ʷ	t͡sʰz̩̄	t͡sʰẑ̩ t͡sʰz̩̄	t͡sʰē̝ ɲê̝
Yi Pinyin		cyp	nyip	suo	ly	nge	fut	shyp	hxit	ggu	cy	cyp cy	ci nyip

== See also ==
- Appendix:Yi (Mihei) word list on Wiktionary (Mihei is a Nuosu dialect)
