= Yi script =

Script used to write the Yi languages

Yi
- nuosu bburma or Yi script
- Script type: Syllabary in modern form; Logographic in archaic variations
- Period: Since at least 15th century (earliest attestation) to present, syllabic version established in 1974
- Direction: Left-to-right
- Languages: various Yi languages

Related scripts
- Parent systems: Oracle bone script: Seal script; Clerical script; Regular script; Yi

ISO 15924
- ISO 15924: Yiii (460), Yi

Unicode
- Unicode alias: Yi
- Unicode range: U+A000–U+A48F Yi Syllables, U+A490–U+A4CF Yi Radicals

The Yi scripts (Yi: ꆈꌠꁱꂷ, romanized: nuosu bburma; Chinese: 彝文; pinyin: Yíwén (Note: Historically known in Chinese under various additional names, such as cuànwén (Chinese: 爨文) and wéishū (Chinese: 韪书).)) are two scripts used to write the Yi languages; Classical Yi (an ideographic script), and the later Yi syllabary.

This is to be distinguished from romanized Yi (Chinese: 彝文罗马拼音; pinyin: Yíwén Luómǎ pīnyīn) which was a system (or systems) invented by missionaries and intermittently used afterwards by some government institutions (and still used outside Sichuan province for non-Nuosu Yi languages, but adapted from the standard Hanyu Pinyin system and used to romanize another syllabary based on a subset of simplified Han ideograms). There was also the alphasyllabary (or abugida) devised by Sam Pollard, the Pollard script for the Miao language spoken in Yunnan province, which he adapted for the Nasu language as well. Present day traditional Yi writing can be sub-divided into five main varieties, namely, Nuosu (the prestige form of the Yi language centred on the Liangshan area), Nasu (including the Wusa), Nisu (Southern Yi), Sani and Azhe.

== Classical Yi ==
Classical Yi or Traditional Yi is a syllabic logographic system that was reputedly devised, according to Nuosu mythology, during the Tang dynasty (618–907) by a Nuosu hero called Aki (Chinese: 阿畸; pinyin: Āqí). However, the earliest surviving examples of the Yi script date back to only the late 15th century and early 16th century, the earliest dated example being an inscription on a bronze bell dated to 1485. There are tens of thousands of manuscripts in the Yi script, dating back several centuries, although most are undated. In recent years a number of Yi manuscript texts written in traditional Yi script have been published.

The original script is said to have comprised 1,840 characters, but over the centuries widely divergent glyph forms have developed in different Yi-speaking areas, an extreme example being the character for "stomach" which exists in some forty glyph variants. Due to this regional variation as many as 90,000 different Yi glyphs are known from manuscripts and inscriptions. Factors for regional divergence include usage in manuscripts instead of printed material and isolation of Yi communities. Although similar to Chinese in function, the glyphs are independent in form, with little to suggest that they are directly related. However, there are some borrowings from Chinese, such as the characters for numbers used in some Yi script traditions.

Languages written with the classical script included Nuosu, Nisu, Wusa Nasu, and Mantsi. Used by Bimo priests, it is traditionally written on manuscripts from top to bottom, in columns stacking from left to right, then rotated during reading to be read from right to left, in rows from top to bottom.

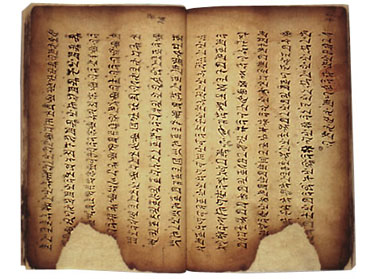
A Yi manuscript from 1814.

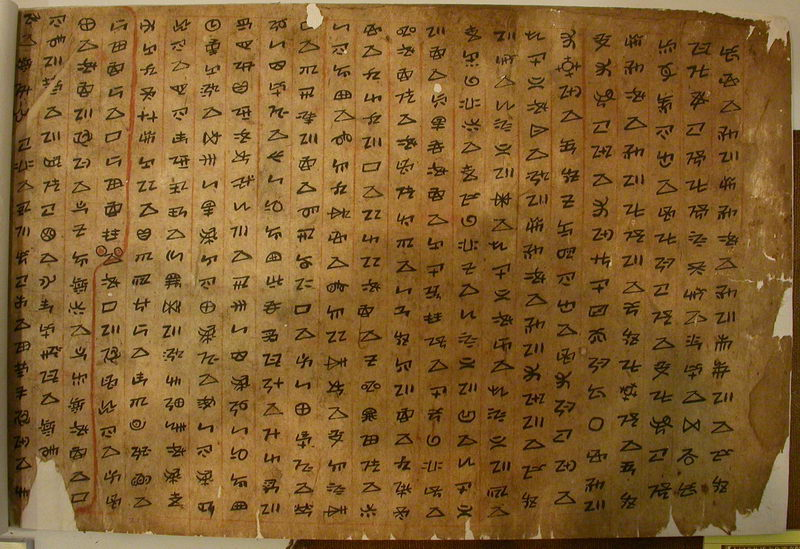
A classical Yi manuscript.

== Modern Yi ==
The Modern Yi script (ꆈꌠꁱꂷ nuosu bburma [nɔ̄sβ̩ bβ̠̩mā] 'Nuosu script') is a standardized syllabary derived from the classic script in 1974 by the local Ethnic Affairs Commission in Sichuan.

In 1980, it was ratified by the State Council as the official script of the Liangshan dialect of the Nuosu Yi language of Liangshan Yi Autonomous Prefecture, and consequently is known as Liangshan Standard Yi Script (涼山規範彝文 Liángshān guīfàn Yíwén). There are 756 basic glyphs based on the Liangshan dialect, plus 63 for syllables used only for words borrowed from Chinese.

Yunnan did not officially adopt the Liangshan script, but developed its own Yunnan Standard Yi Script (云南规范彝文方案 Yúnnán Guīfàn Yíwén Fāng'àn) on different principles, which emphasized cross-dialect intelligibility, as well as retention of shared logographic forms. The Yunnan script has 2,608 glyphs, of which 2,258 are logographic, plus 350 phonetic glyphs. The Yunnan script was ratified by the provincial government in Yunnan in 1987. Guizhou published a dictionary in 1991 which identified standard and variant forms of traditional Yi logographs used in Nasu area.

The native syllabary represents vowel and consonant-vowel syllables, formed of 43 consonants and 8 vowels that can occur with any of three tones, plus two "buzzing" vowels that can only occur as mid tone. Not all combinations are possible.

Although the Liangshan dialect has four tones (and others have more), only three tones (high, mid, low) have separate glyphs. The fourth tone (rising) may sometimes occur as a grammatical inflection of the mid tone, so it is written with the mid-tone glyph plus a diacritic mark (a superscript arc). Counting syllables with this diacritic, the script represents 1,164 syllables. In addition, there is a syllable iteration mark, ꀕ (represented as w in Yi pinyin), that is used to reduplicate a preceding syllable.

=== Yi in pinyin ===
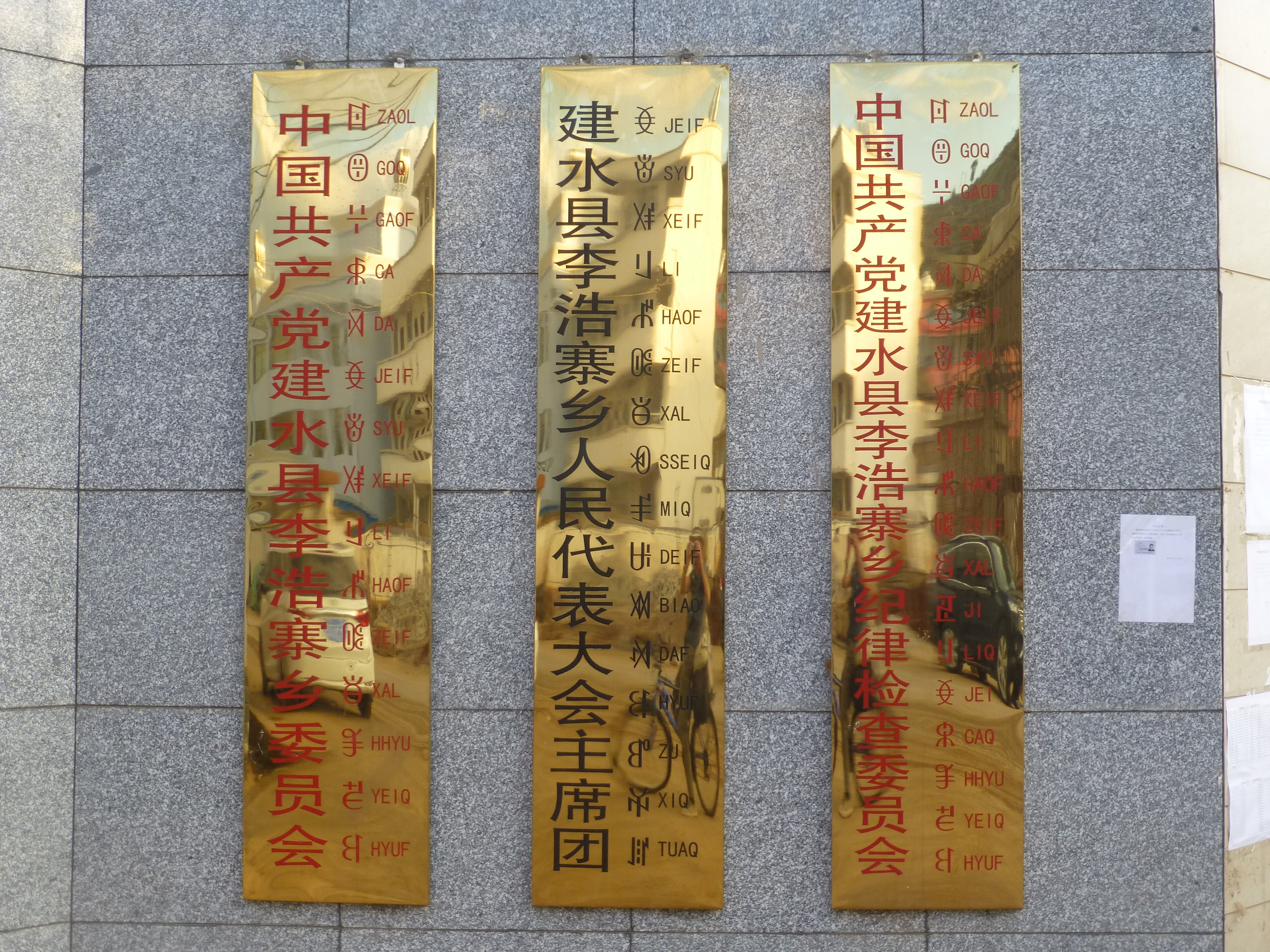
Trilingual signs, in Chinese (logosyllabic script), Yi (syllabic script), and Hani (alphabetic Hanyu Pinyin romanization) on the Lihaozhai Township government office. Jianshui County, Yunnan. The Yi and Hani texts apparently have a syllable-to-syllable correspondence to the Chinese text. The standard Sichuan Yi Pinyin transcription is not used here because these signs are displayed in a province where the Nuosu (Northern Yi) language is not natively spoken. The displayed transcription with the modern Yi syllabic script (which is a huge simplification of the Classical Yi logosyllabic script which was used before the 1980s but with many non standardized variants) is less precise than the modern Hani Pinyin romanization.

Only the Northern Yi (Nuosu) language spoken in Sichuan is currently standardized and officialized using the modern Yi syllabary. The syllabary may be used as well for other Lolo languages elsewhere in China, notably for the Hani (Southern Yi) dialect spoken in Yunnan Province, where it is used on some public displays (along with romanizations or Han transcriptions), but their Pinyin romanization uses a different system, based on Chinese Pinyin, which may offer additional phonetic distinctions that are still not representable in the standard Yi syllabary.

The expanded Sichuan Yi Pinyin letters used to write Nuosu (Northern Yi) in Sichuan Province are:

==== Consonants ====
The consonant series are tenuis stop, aspirate, voiced, prenasalized, voiceless nasal, voiced nasal, voiceless fricative, voiced fricative, respectively. In addition, hl, l are laterals, and hx is [h]. v, w, ss, r, y are the voiced fricatives. With stops and affricates (as well as s), voicing is shown by doubling the letter.

- Plosive series
  - Labial: b [p], p [pʰ], bb [b], nb [ᵐb], hm [m̥], m [m], f [f], v [v]
  - Alveolar: d [t], t [tʰ], dd [d], nd [ⁿd], hn [n̥], n [n], hl [l̥], l [l]
  - Velar: g [k], k [kʰ], gg [ɡ], mg [ᵑɡ], hx [h], ng [ŋ], h [x], w [ɣ]
- Affricate and fricative series
  - Alveolar: z [t͡s], c [t͡sʰ], zz [d͡z], nz [ⁿd͡z], s [s], ss [z]
  - Retroflex: zh [t͡ʂ], ch [t͡ʂʰ], rr [d͡ʐ], nr [ⁿd͡ʐ], sh [ʂ], r [ʐ]
  - Palatal: j [t͡ɕ], q [t͡ɕʰ], jj [d͡ʑ], nj [ⁿd͡ʑ], ny [ɲ], x [ɕ], y [ʑ]

==== Vowels ====
Vowels
Sichuan Yi Pinyin transliteration	i	ie	a	uo	o	e	u	ur	y	yr
IPA transcription (for Nuosu)	[i] or [e̝]	[ɛ]	[a] or [a̠]	[ɔ] or [ɔ̠]	[o] or [o̝]	[ɯ] or [ɤ̝]	[u] or [v̩ʷ]	[u̠] or [v̠̩ʷ]	[z̩]	[z̠̩]

The two "buzzing" vowels Romanized in Pinyin as 'ur' and 'yr' (occurring only with the mid tone in the standard Nuosu dialect) are transcribed distinctly in IPA notations using a subscripted minus sign below the base vowel; this minus sign diacritic is optional in phonologic transcriptions below the base vowel [a] or [ɔ] as it is not distinctive. The other alternate transcriptions using an "up tack" diacritic below the base vowel are only phonetic for some Nuosu dialects, but not needed in phonologic transcriptions.

All IPA transcriptions may vary with sources and authors, depending on dialects or when representing local accents more precisely than the simplified phonology. The last two base vowels romanized in Pinyin as 'u' or 'y' may also be transcribed in IPA using a Latin consonant [v] or [z] but with an additional vertical tick below (to distinguish them from normal leading consonants, notably when multisyllabic Yi terms are transcribed phonetically without separating spaces between syllables).

==== Tones ====
An unmarked Pinyin syllable has mid-level tone (33), i.e. [ā] (or alternatively [a³³] or [a˧]). Other tones are represented in Sichuan Yi Pinyin by appending a basic Latin consonant, and transcribed in IPA by appending modifier digits or IPA tone symbols, or by adding an accent diacritic above the base vowel symbol:

- t : high level tone (55), i.e. [a̋] (or alternatively [a⁵⁵] or [a˥])
- x : high rising tone (34), i.e. [ǎ] or [á] (or alternatively [a³⁴] or [a˧˦])
- p : low falling tone (21), i.e. [â] (or alternatively [a²¹] or [a˨˩])

=== Syllabary ===
The syllabary of standard modern Yi is illustrated in the two tables below. The consonant sound represented in each column comes first before the vowel and tone sound represented in each row; the top-right cell (highlighted with a pink background in the table below) shows the additional syllable iteration mark (in standard Sichuan Yi Pinyin, it is romanized as 'w', but its actual phonetic value is variable and comes directly from the syllable written just before it).

Syllables represented for the rising (-x) tone are highlighted with a pale yellow background, and are based on the glyph for the mid tone (or the low tone if there's no syllable represented for the mid tone), with an additional stroke for the superscript arc. The three glyphs for ꅷ, ꋺ, ꃲ, 'hnox, nzox, vex' syllables with the rising tone (highlighted with a plain yellow background in the two tables below), are composed differently from other syllables with the rising tone: as the root syllable (i.e. 'hno, nzo, ve') for their characters does not have a form in the normal mid tone (on the next row), they use the low tone character (-p, shown two rows below) with the arc diacritic (-x) noting the rising tone. (view table as an image):

	–	b [p]	p [pʰ]	bb [b]	nb [ᵐb]	hm [m̥]	m [m]	f [f]	v [v]	d [t]	t [tʰ]	dd [d]	nd [ⁿd]	hn [n̥]	n [n]	hl [l̥]	l [l]	g [k]	k [kʰ]	gg [ɡ]	mg [ᵑɡ]	hx [h]	ng [ŋ]	h [x]	w [ɣ]	ꀕ
it [e̝̋]	ꀀ	ꀖ	ꀸ	ꁖ	ꁶ	ꂑ	ꂮ	ꃍ	ꃢ	ꄀ	ꄚ	ꄶ	ꅑ	ꅨ	ꅽ	ꆗ	ꆷ	ꇚ	ꇸ	ꈔ		ꉆ		ꉮ		it [e̝̋]
ix [é̝]	ꀁ	ꀗ	ꀹ	ꁗ	ꁷ	ꂒ	ꂯ	ꃎ	ꃣ	ꄁ	ꄛ	ꄷ	ꅒ	ꅩ	ꅾ	ꆘ	ꆸ	ꇛ	ꇹ	ꈕ		ꉇ				ix [é̝]
i [ē̝]	ꀂ	ꀘ	ꀺ	ꁘ	ꁸ	ꂓ	ꂰ	ꃏ	ꃤ	ꄂ	ꄜ	ꄸ	ꅓ	ꅪ	ꅿ	ꆙ	ꆹ	ꇜ	ꇺ	ꈖ		ꉈ				i [ē̝]
ip [ê̝]	ꀃ	ꀙ	ꀻ	ꁙ	ꁹ	ꂔ	ꂱ	ꃐ	ꃥ	ꄃ	ꄝ	ꄹ	ꅔ	ꅫ	ꆀ	ꆚ	ꆺ	ꇝ	ꇻ			ꉉ				ip [ê̝]
iet [ɛ̠̋]	ꀄ	ꀚ		ꁚ					ꃦ					ꅬ			ꆻ	ꇞ				ꉊ				iet [ɛ̠̋]
iex [ɛ̠́]	ꀅ	ꀛ	ꀼ	ꁛ	ꁺ	ꂕ	ꂲ		ꃧ	ꄄ	ꄞ	ꄺ	ꅕ	ꅭ	ꆁ	ꆛ	ꆼ	ꇟ	ꇼ	ꈗ	ꈰ	ꉋ	ꉝ	ꉯ		iex [ɛ̠́]
ie [ɛ̠̄]	ꀆ	ꀜ	ꀽ	ꁜ	ꁻ	ꂖ	ꂳ		ꃨ	ꄅ	ꄟ	ꄻ	ꅖ	ꅮ	ꆂ	ꆜ	ꆽ	ꇠ	ꇽ	ꈘ	ꈱ	ꉌ	ꉞ	ꉰ		ie [ɛ̠̄]
iep [ɛ̠̂]	ꀇ	ꀝ	ꀾ	ꁝ	ꁼ	ꂗ	ꂴ		ꃩ	ꄆ	ꄠ	ꄼ		ꅯ	ꆃ	ꆝ	ꆾ	ꇡ	ꇾ	ꈙ		ꉍ	ꉟ			iep [ɛ̠̂]
at [a̠̋]	ꀈ	ꀞ	ꀿ	ꁞ	ꁽ	ꂘ	ꂵ	ꃑ	ꃪ	ꄇ	ꄡ	ꄽ	ꅗ	ꅰ		ꆞ	ꆿ	ꇢ	ꇿ	ꈚ	ꈲ	ꉎ	ꉠ	ꉱ	ꊀ	at [a̠̋]
ax [á̠]	ꀉ	ꀟ	ꁀ	ꁟ	ꁾ	ꂙ	ꂶ	ꃒ	ꃫ	ꄈ	ꄢ	ꄾ	ꅘ	ꅱ	ꆄ	ꆟ	ꇀ	ꇣ	ꈀ	ꈛ	ꈳ	ꉏ	ꉡ	ꉲ	ꊁ	ax [á̠]
a [ā̠]	ꀊ	ꀠ	ꁁ	ꁠ	ꁿ	ꂚ	ꂷ	ꃓ	ꃬ	ꄉ	ꄣ	ꄿ	ꅙ	ꅲ	ꆅ	ꆠ	ꇁ	ꇤ	ꈁ	ꈜ	ꈴ	ꉐ	ꉢ	ꉳ	ꊂ	a [ā̠]
ap [â̠]	ꀋ	ꀡ	ꁂ	ꁡ	ꂀ	ꂛ	ꂸ	ꃔ	ꃭ	ꄊ	ꄤ	ꅀ	ꅚ	ꅳ	ꆆ	ꆡ	ꇂ	ꇥ	ꈂ	ꈝ	ꈵ	ꉑ	ꉣ	ꉴ	ꊃ	ap [â̠]
uot [ɔ̠̋]							ꂹ				ꄥ						ꇃ	ꇦ		ꈞ		ꉒ	ꉤ	ꉵ		uot [ɔ̠̋]
uox [ɔ̠́]	ꀌ	ꀢ	ꁃ	ꁢ		ꂜ	ꂺ			ꄋ	ꄦ	ꅁ		ꅴ	ꆇ	ꆢ	ꇄ	ꇧ	ꈃ	ꈟ	ꈶ	ꉓ	ꉥ	ꉶ	ꊄ	uox [ɔ̠́]
uo [ɔ̠̄]	ꀍ	ꀣ	ꁄ	ꁣ		ꂝ	ꂻ			ꄌ	ꄧ	ꅂ		ꅵ	ꆈ	ꆣ	ꇅ	ꇨ	ꈄ	ꈠ	ꈷ	ꉔ	ꉦ	ꉷ	ꊅ	uo [ɔ̠̄]
uop [ɔ̠̂]	ꀎ	ꀤ	ꁅ	ꁤ		ꂞ	ꂼ				ꄨ	ꅃ			ꆉ	ꆤ	ꇆ	ꇩ	ꈅ	ꈡ	ꈸ	ꉕ		ꉸ	ꊆ	uop [ɔ̠̂]
ot [ő̝]	ꀏ	ꀥ	ꁆ	ꁥ	ꂁ	ꂟ	ꂽ		ꃮ	ꄍ	ꄩ	ꅄ	ꅛ	ꅶ	ꆊ		ꇇ	ꇪ	ꈆ	ꈢ	ꈹ	ꉖ	ꉧ	ꉹ		ot [ő̝]
ox [ó̝]	ꀐ	ꀦ	ꁇ	ꁦ	ꂂ	ꂠ	ꂾ	ꃕ	ꃯ	ꄎ	ꄪ	ꅅ	ꅜ	ꅷ	ꆋ	ꆥ	ꇈ	ꇫ	ꈇ	ꈣ	ꈺ	ꉗ	ꉨ	ꉺ	ꊇ	ox [ó̝]
o [ō̝]	ꀑ	ꀧ	ꁈ	ꁧ	ꂃ	ꂡ	ꂿ	ꃖ	ꃰ	ꄏ	ꄫ	ꅆ	ꅝ		ꆌ	ꆦ	ꇉ	ꇬ	ꈈ	ꈤ	ꈻ	ꉘ	ꉩ	ꉻ	ꊈ	o [ō̝]
op [ô̝]	ꀒ	ꀨ	ꁉ	ꁨ	ꂄ	ꂢ	ꃀ	ꃗ	ꃱ	ꄐ	ꄬ	ꅇ	ꅞ	ꅸ	ꆍ	ꆧ	ꇊ	ꇭ	ꈉ	ꈥ	ꈼ	ꉙ	ꉪ	ꉼ	ꊉ	op [ô̝]
	–	b [p]	p [pʰ]	bb [b]	nb [ᵐb]	hm [m̥]	m [m]	f [f]	v [v]	d [t]	t [tʰ]	dd [d]	nd [ⁿd]	hn [n̥]	n [n]	hl [l̥]	l [l]	g [k]	k [kʰ]	gg [ɡ]	mg [ᵑɡ]	hx [h]	ng [ŋ]	h [x]	w [ɣ]	
et [ɤ̝̋]																		ꇮ	ꈊ	ꈦ						et [ɤ̝̋]
ex [ɤ̝́]	ꀓ	ꀩ		ꁩ			ꃁ		ꃲ	ꄑ	ꄭ	ꅈ	ꅟ	ꅹ	ꆎ	ꆨ	ꇋ	ꇯ	ꈋ	ꈧ	ꈽ	ꉚ	ꉫ	ꉽ	ꊊ	ex [ɤ̝́]
e [ɤ̝̄]	ꀔ	ꀪ		ꁪ			ꃂ			ꄒ	ꄮ	ꅉ	ꅠ	ꅺ	ꆏ	ꆩ	ꇌ	ꇰ	ꈌ	ꈨ	ꈾ	ꉛ	ꉬ	ꉾ	ꊋ	e [ɤ̝̄]
ep [ɤ̝̂]		ꀫ		ꁫ					ꃳ	ꄓ	ꄯ	ꅊ	ꅡ	ꅻ	ꆐ	ꆪ	ꇍ	ꇱ	ꈍ	ꈩ	ꈿ	ꉜ	ꉭ	ꉿ	ꊌ	ep [ɤ̝̂]
ut [v̩̋ʷ]		ꀬ	ꁊ	ꁬ	ꂅ	ꂣ	ꃃ	ꃘ	ꃴ	ꄔ	ꄰ	ꅋ	ꅢ	ꅼ	ꆑ	ꆫ	ꇎ	ꇲ	ꈎ	ꈪ	ꉀ					ut [v̩̋ʷ]
ux [v̩́ʷ]		ꀭ	ꁋ	ꁭ	ꂆ	ꂤ	ꃄ	ꃙ	ꃵ	ꄕ	ꄱ	ꅌ	ꅣ		ꆒ	ꆬ	ꇏ	ꇳ	ꈏ	ꈫ	ꉁ					ux [v̩́ʷ]
u [v̩̄ʷ]		ꀮ	ꁌ	ꁮ	ꂇ	ꂥ	ꃅ	ꃚ	ꃶ	ꄖ	ꄲ	ꅍ	ꅤ		ꆓ	ꆭ	ꇐ	ꇴ	ꈐ	ꈬ	ꉂ					u [v̩̄ʷ]
up [v̩̂ʷ]		ꀯ	ꁍ	ꁯ	ꂈ	ꂦ	ꃆ	ꃛ	ꃷ	ꄗ	ꄳ	ꅎ	ꅥ		ꆔ	ꆮ	ꇑ	ꇵ	ꈑ	ꈭ	ꉃ					up [v̩̂ʷ]
urx [v̠̩́ʷ]		ꀰ	ꁎ	ꁰ	ꂉ	ꂧ	ꃇ	ꃜ	ꃸ	ꄘ	ꄴ	ꅏ	ꅦ		ꆕ	ꆯ	ꇒ	ꇶ	ꈒ	ꈮ	ꉄ					urx [v̠̩́ʷ]
ur [v̠̩̄ʷ]		ꀱ	ꁏ	ꁱ	ꂊ	ꂨ	ꃈ	ꃝ	ꃹ	ꄙ	ꄵ	ꅐ	ꅧ		ꆖ	ꆰ	ꇓ	ꇷ	ꈓ	ꈯ	ꉅ					ur [v̠̩̄ʷ]
yt [z̩̋]		ꀲ	ꁐ	ꁲ	ꂋ		ꃉ	ꃞ	ꃺ							ꆱ	ꇔ									yt [z̩̋]
yx [ź̩]		ꀳ	ꁑ	ꁳ	ꂌ	ꂩ	ꃊ	ꃟ	ꃻ							ꆲ	ꇕ									yx [ź̩]
y [z̩̄]		ꀴ	ꁒ	ꁴ	ꂍ	ꂪ	ꃋ	ꃠ	ꃼ							ꆳ	ꇖ									y [z̩̄]
yp [ẑ̩]		ꀵ	ꁓ	ꁵ	ꂎ	ꂫ	ꃌ	ꃡ	ꃽ							ꆴ	ꇗ									yp [ẑ̩]
yrx [ź̠̩]		ꀶ	ꁔ		ꂏ	ꂬ			ꃾ							ꆵ	ꇘ									yrx [ź̠̩]
yr [z̠̩̄]		ꀷ	ꁕ		ꂐ	ꂭ			ꃿ							ꆶ	ꇙ									yr [z̠̩̄]
	–	b [p]	p [pʰ]	bb [b]	nb [ᵐb]	hm [m̥]	m [m]	f [f]	v [v]	d [t]	t [tʰ]	dd [d]	nd [ⁿd]	hn [n̥]	n [n]	hl [l̥]	l [l]	g [k]	k [kʰ]	gg [ɡ]	mg [ᵑɡ]	hx [h]	ng [ŋ]	h [x]	w	

	z [t͡s]	c [t͡sʰ]	zz [d͡z]	nz [ⁿd͡z]	s [s]	ss [z]	zh [t͡ʂ]	ch [t͡ʂʰ]	rr [d͡ʐ]	nr [ⁿd͡ʐ]	sh [ʂ]	r [ʐ]	j [t͡ɕ]	q [t͡ɕʰ]	jj [d͡ʑ]	nj [ⁿd͡ʑ]	ny [ɲ]	x [ɕ]	y [ʑ]	
it [e̝̋]	ꊍ	ꊮ	ꋐ	ꋭ	ꌉ	ꌪ							ꏠ	ꏼ	ꐘ	ꐱ	ꑊ	ꑝ	ꑱ	it [e̝̋]
ix [é̝]	ꊎ	ꊯ	ꋑ	ꋮ	ꌊ	ꌫ							ꏡ	ꏽ	ꐙ	ꐲ	ꑋ	ꑞ	ꑲ	ix [é̝]
i [ē̝]	ꊏ	ꊰ	ꋒ	ꋯ	ꌋ	ꌬ							ꏢ	ꏾ	ꐚ	ꐳ	ꑌ	ꑟ	ꑳ	i [ē̝]
ip [ê̝]	ꊐ	ꊱ	ꋓ	ꋰ	ꌌ	ꌭ							ꏣ	ꏿ	ꐛ	ꐴ	ꑍ	ꑠ	ꑴ	ip [ê̝]
iet [ɛ̠̋]		ꊲ	ꋔ										ꏤ	ꐀ	ꐜ	ꐵ	ꑎ	ꑡ	ꑵ	iet [ɛ̠̋]
iex [ɛ̠́]	ꊑ	ꊳ	ꋕ	ꋱ	ꌍ	ꌮ							ꏥ	ꐁ	ꐝ	ꐶ	ꑏ	ꑢ	ꑶ	iex [ɛ̠́]
ie [ɛ̠̄]	ꊒ	ꊴ	ꋖ	ꋲ	ꌎ	ꌯ							ꏦ	ꐂ	ꐞ	ꐷ	ꑐ	ꑣ	ꑷ	ie [ɛ̠̄]
iep [ɛ̠̂]	ꊓ	ꊵ	ꋗ	ꋳ	ꌏ	ꌰ							ꏧ	ꐃ	ꐟ	ꐸ	ꑑ	ꑤ	ꑸ	iep [ɛ̠̂]
at [a̠̋]	ꊔ	ꊶ	ꋘ	ꋴ	ꌐ	ꌱ	ꍆ	ꍡ		ꎔ	ꎫ	ꏆ								at [a̠̋]
ax [á̠]	ꊕ	ꊷ	ꋙ	ꋵ	ꌑ	ꌲ	ꍇ	ꍢ	ꍼ	ꎕ	ꎬ	ꏇ								ax [á̠]
a [ā̠]	ꊖ	ꊸ	ꋚ	ꋶ	ꌒ	ꌳ	ꍈ	ꍣ	ꍽ	ꎖ	ꎭ	ꏈ								a [ā̠]
ap [â̠]	ꊗ	ꊹ	ꋛ	ꋷ	ꌓ	ꌴ	ꍉ	ꍤ		ꎗ	ꎮ	ꏉ								ap [â̠]
uot [ɔ̠̋]								ꍥ					ꏨ	ꐄ					ꑹ	uot [ɔ̠̋]
uox [ɔ̠́]	ꊘ	ꊺ		ꋸ	ꌔ		ꍊ	ꍦ	ꍾ		ꎯ	ꏊ	ꏩ	ꐅ	ꐠ	ꐹ	ꑒ	ꑥ	ꑺ	uox [ɔ̠́]
uo [ɔ̠̄]	ꊙ	ꊻ		ꋹ	ꌕ		ꍋ	ꍧ	ꍿ		ꎰ	ꏋ	ꏪ	ꐆ	ꐡ	ꐺ	ꑓ	ꑦ	ꑻ	uo [ɔ̠̄]
uop [ɔ̠̂]	ꊚ	ꊼ			ꌖ		ꍌ	ꍨ			ꎱ	ꏌ	ꏫ	ꐇ	ꐢ		ꑔ		ꑼ	uop [ɔ̠̂]
ot [ő̝]	ꊛ	ꊽ			ꌗ	ꌵ	ꍍ	ꍩ	ꎀ		ꎲ	ꏍ	ꏬ	ꐈ	ꐣ	ꐻ	ꑕ	ꑧ	ꑽ	ot [ő̝]
ox [ó̝]	ꊜ	ꊾ	ꋜ	ꋺ	ꌘ	ꌶ	ꍎ	ꍪ	ꎁ	ꎘ	ꎳ	ꏎ	ꏭ	ꐉ	ꐤ	ꐼ	ꑖ	ꑨ	ꑾ	ox [ó̝]
o [ō̝]	ꊝ	ꊿ	ꋝ		ꌙ	ꌷ	ꍏ	ꍫ	ꎂ	ꎙ	ꎴ	ꏏ	ꏮ	ꐊ	ꐥ	ꐽ	ꑗ	ꑩ	ꑿ	o [ō̝]
op [ô̝]	ꊞ	ꋀ	ꋞ	ꋻ	ꌚ	ꌸ	ꍐ	ꍬ	ꎃ	ꎚ	ꎵ	ꏐ	ꏯ	ꐋ	ꐦ	ꐾ	ꑘ	ꑪ	ꒀ	op [ô̝]
	z [t͡s]	c [t͡sʰ]	zz [d͡z]	nz [ⁿd͡z]	s [s]	ss [z]	zh [t͡ʂ]	ch [t͡ʂʰ]	rr [d͡ʐ]	nr [ⁿd͡ʐ]	sh [ʂ]	r [ʐ]	j [t͡ɕ]	q [t͡ɕʰ]	jj [d͡ʑ]	nj [ⁿd͡ʑ]	ny [ɲ]	x [ɕ]	y [ʑ]	
et [ɤ̝̋]							ꍑ	ꍭ	ꎄ	ꎛ	ꎶ									et [ɤ̝̋]
ex [ɤ̝́]	ꊟ	ꋁ	ꋟ	ꋼ	ꌛ	ꌹ	ꍒ	ꍮ	ꎅ	ꎜ	ꎷ	ꏑ								ex [ɤ̝́]
e [ɤ̝̄]	ꊠ	ꋂ	ꋠ	ꋽ	ꌜ	ꌺ	ꍓ	ꍯ	ꎆ	ꎝ	ꎸ	ꏒ								e [ɤ̝̄]
ep [ɤ̝̂]	ꊡ	ꋃ	ꋡ		ꌝ	ꌻ	ꍔ	ꍰ	ꎇ	ꎞ	ꎹ	ꏓ								ep [ɤ̝̂]
ut [v̩̋ʷ]	ꊢ	ꋄ			ꌞ	ꌼ	ꍕ		ꎈ	ꎟ	ꎺ	ꏔ	ꏰ	ꐌ	ꐧ		ꑙ		ꒁ	ut [v̩̋ʷ]
ux [v̩́ʷ]	ꊣ	ꋅ	ꋢ	ꋾ	ꌟ	ꌽ	ꍖ	ꍱ	ꎉ	ꎠ	ꎻ	ꏕ	ꏱ	ꐍ	ꐨ	ꐿ	ꑚ		ꒂ	ux [v̩́ʷ]
u [v̩̄ʷ]	ꊤ	ꋆ	ꋣ	ꋿ	ꌠ	ꌾ	ꍗ	ꍲ	ꎊ	ꎡ	ꎼ	ꏖ	ꏲ	ꐎ	ꐩ	ꑀ	ꑛ		ꒃ	u [v̩̄ʷ]
up [v̩̂ʷ]	ꊥ	ꋇ	ꋤ	ꌀ	ꌡ	ꌿ	ꍘ	ꍳ	ꎋ	ꎢ	ꎽ	ꏗ	ꏳ	ꐏ	ꐪ	ꑁ	ꑜ		ꒄ	up [v̩̂ʷ]
urx [v̠̩́ʷ]	ꊦ	ꋈ	ꋥ	ꌁ	ꌢ		ꍙ	ꍴ	ꎌ	ꎣ	ꎾ	ꏘ	ꏴ	ꐐ	ꐫ	ꑂ			ꒅ	urx [v̠̩́ʷ]
ur [v̠̩̄ʷ]	ꊧ	ꋉ	ꋦ	ꌂ	ꌣ		ꍚ	ꍵ	ꎍ	ꎤ	ꎿ	ꏙ	ꏵ	ꐑ	ꐬ	ꑃ			ꒆ	ur [v̠̩̄ʷ]
yt [z̩̋]	ꊨ	ꋊ	ꋧ	ꌃ	ꌤ	ꍀ	ꍛ	ꍶ	ꎎ	ꎥ	ꏀ	ꏚ	ꏶ	ꐒ	ꐭ	ꑄ		ꑫ	ꒇ	yt [z̩̋]
yx [ź̩]	ꊩ	ꋋ	ꋨ	ꌄ	ꌥ	ꍁ	ꍜ	ꍷ	ꎏ	ꎦ	ꏁ	ꏛ	ꏷ	ꐓ	ꐮ	ꑅ		ꑬ	ꒈ	yx [ź̩]
y [z̩̄]	ꊪ	ꋌ	ꋩ	ꌅ	ꌦ	ꍂ	ꍝ	ꍸ	ꎐ	ꎧ	ꏂ	ꏜ	ꏸ	ꐔ	ꐯ	ꑆ		ꑭ	ꒉ	y [z̩̄]
yp [ẑ̩]	ꊫ	ꋍ	ꋪ	ꌆ	ꌧ	ꍃ	ꍞ	ꍹ	ꎑ	ꎨ	ꏃ	ꏝ	ꏹ	ꐕ	ꐰ	ꑇ		ꑮ	ꒊ	yp [ẑ̩]
yrx [ź̠̩]	ꊬ	ꋎ	ꋫ	ꌇ	ꌨ	ꍄ	ꍟ	ꍺ	ꎒ	ꎩ	ꏄ	ꏞ	ꏺ	ꐖ		ꑈ		ꑯ	ꒋ	yrx [ź̠̩]
yr [z̠̩̄]	ꊭ	ꋏ	ꋬ	ꌈ	ꌩ	ꍅ	ꍠ	ꍻ	ꎓ	ꎪ	ꏅ	ꏟ	ꏻ	ꐗ		ꑉ		ꑰ	ꒌ	yr [z̠̩̄]
	z [t͡s]	c [t͡sʰ]	zz [d͡z]	nz [ⁿd͡z]	s [s]	ss [z]	zh [t͡ʂ]	ch [t͡ʂʰ]	rr [d͡ʐ]	nr [ⁿd͡ʐ]	sh [ʂ]	r [ʐ]	j [t͡ɕ]	q [t͡ɕʰ]	jj [d͡ʑ]	nj [ⁿd͡ʑ]	ny [ɲ]	x [ɕ]	y [ʑ]	

== Unicode ==
The Unicode block for Modern Yi is Yi syllables (U+A000 to U+A48C), and comprises 1,164 syllables (syllables with a diacritical arc mark are encoded separately only in precomposed form, they are not canonically decomposable into a syllable plus a combining diacritical arc mark) and one syllable iteration mark (U+A015, incorrectly named YI SYLLABLE WU). In addition, a set of 55 radicals for use in dictionary classification are encoded at U+A490 to U+A4C6 (Yi Radicals). Yi syllables and Yi radicals were added as new blocks to Unicode Standard with version 3.0.

Classical Yi has not yet been encoded in Unicode, but a proposal to encode 88,613 Classical Yi characters was made in 2007 (including many variants for specific regional dialects or historical evolutions). They are based on an extended set of radicals (there are about 109 known radicals shared across at least nine of ten Nuosu dialects, more than those used in the Modern Yi syllabary, and in rare cases some glyphs were borrowed from Chinese, not necessarily with any semantic or phonologic similarity). As of 2026, current work is being carried out by the Ideographic Yi Unicode Submission Working Group.

== See also ==
- Ba–Shu scripts
- Chinese family of scripts
- Nisoish languages
