= Xingquan =

Xingquan 兴泉镇
- Town
- Location in Yunnan.
- Coordinates: 26°37′29″N 101°24′33″E
- Country: People's Republic of China
- Province: Yunnan
- Prefecture-level city: Lijiang
- County: Huaping County
- Designated (town): 2002

Area
  - Total: 228.7 km^{2} (88.3 sq mi)

Population (2017)
  - Total: 18,516
  - Density: 80.96/km^{2} (209.7/sq mi)
- Time zone: UTC+08:00 (China Standard)
- Postal code: 674801
- Area code: 0888

Xingquan (simplified Chinese: 兴泉镇; traditional Chinese: 興泉鎮; pinyin: Xīngquán Zhèn) is a town in Huaping County, Yunnan, China. As of the 2017 statistics it had a population of 18,516 and an area of 228.7-square-kilometre (88.3 sq mi).

== Administrative division ==
As of 2016, the town is divided into nine villages:

- Xingquan (兴泉村)
- Xinwen (新文村)
- Ganjing (干箐村)
- Nanyang (南阳村)
- Wenle (文乐村)
- Songzhu (松竹村)
- Qinglong (青龙村)
- Tangfang (塘房村)
- Guantang (关塘村)

== History ==
The town was known as "Fuquan" (福泉镇) in the Republic of China.

After the founding of the People's Republic of China, in 1950, it was called "Daxing District" (大兴区). In 1958, it was renamed "Daxing People's Commune" (大兴人民公社). The town reverted to its former name of "Daxing District" in 1984. In 1988, it split into Daxing Township (大兴乡) and Wenle Lisu Ethnic Township (文乐傈僳族乡). In 2002, it was upgraded to a town. On 6 January 2006, the two townships merged to form the town of Xingquan (兴泉镇).

== Geography ==
The town is situated in the northeastern Huaping County, bordering Zhongxin and Chuanfang Lisu Ethnic Township to the west, Shilongba to the south, Huimin of Yanbian County to the north, and Geliping of Xi District to the east. The highest point in the town is Leng Mountain (冷山; 'Cold Mountain') which stands 2,860 metres (9,380 ft) above sea level. The lowest point is Sandong Bridge (三洞桥; 'Three Hole Bridge'), which, at 1,220 metres (4,000 ft) above sea level.

The Daxing River (大兴河), Longdong River (龙洞河) and Nanyang River (南阳河) flow through the town.

Xinwen Reservoir (新文水库) is a reservoir located in the town.

== Economy ==
Agriculture, mineral resources and building material are the major industries. Peaches, vegetables and tobacco are the economic plants of this region. The region abounds with coal, limestone, graphite, and clay.

== Demographics ==
Population census
Year	Pop.	±%
1990	17,712	—
2017	18,516	+4.5%

As of 2017, the National Bureau of Statistics of China estimates the town's population now to be 18,516. The main ethnic groups in the town are Yi, Zhuang, Dai, Miao, Lisu, Hui and Nakhi.

== Tourist attractions ==
The Suolong Bridge (锁龙桥; 'Locking Dragon Bridge') is a popular attraction in the town.

== Transportation ==
The town is connected to two highways: the China National Highway 353 and the G4216 Expressway.
