= Huaping County =

Huaping County 华坪县
- County
- Location of Huaping County (red) and Lijiang City (pink) within Yunnan province

- Location of the seat in Yunnan
- Coordinates: 26°39′33″N 101°16′44″E
- Country: People's Republic of China
- Province: Yunnan
- Prefecture-level city: Lijiang

Area
  - Total: 2,266 km^{2} (875 sq mi)

Population (2020)
  - Total: 159,695
  - Density: 70.47/km^{2} (182.5/sq mi)
- Time zone: UTC+8 (CST)
- Postal code: 674800
- Area code: 0888
- Climate: Cwa

Huaping County (simplified Chinese: 华坪县; traditional Chinese: 華坪縣; pinyin: Huápíng Xiàn) is a county of Lijiang City, in the north of Yunnan province, China, bordering Sichuan province to the east. Located at the northwestern of Yunnan, it covers an area of 2,200-square-kilometre (850 sq mi) and had a population of 159,695 in 2020 statistics. Huaping County has four towns and four ethnic townships under its jurisdiction, its administrative centre is at the town of Zhongxin.

== History ==
The earliest evidence of human settlement in Huaping County dates back to the Neolithic Age and is related to the Huilongwan archaeological relics (回龙弯遗迹).

The first dynasty to rule Huaping County was the Han dynasty (202 BC–220 AD), beginning in 130 BC, after Emperor Wu sent Sima Xiangru to appease the tribes in southwest China (西南夷). In 111 BC, it known as Shifu County (姑复县) and was under the jurisdiction of Yuesui Commandery.

In the Three Kingdoms period (220–280), Zhuge Liang went on a punitive expedition to the southern tribes, after Meng Huo surrendered, it came under the jurisdiction of Yunnan Commandery.

In the Tang dynasty (618–907), in 624, it came under the jurisdiction of Yao Zhou. After the An Lushan Rebellion, the Tang Empire fell into recession, soon after the establishment of the Nanzhao Kingdom at the end of the 8th century, it became part of the kingdom and came under the jurisdiction of Shanju Commandery.

In the Song dynasty (960–1279), the region including the current Yunnan province became under the rule of Dali Kingdom.

In the Yuan dynasty (1271–1368), it came under Mongolian sovereign and came under the jurisdiction of Beisheng Zhou.

In the late Qing dynasty (1644–1911), after the bureaucratization of native officers, it was under the jurisdiction of Yongbei Zhili Department (永北直隶厅). In 1909, Huaping County was officially established. Since then, Huaping has officially become an administrative organ at the county level.

Huaping County was controlled by the People's Liberation Army in 1950. It was under jurisdiction of Lijiang in 1980.

== Administrative division ==
According to the result on adjustment of township-level administrative divisions of Huaping county in 2015, Huaping County has four towns and four ethnic townships under its jurisdiction.

Name	Chinese character	Population (2017)	Area (Km2)	Note
Zhongxin	中心镇	47,403	326.4	
Rongjiang	荣将镇	33,450	412.9	
Xingquan	兴泉镇	18,516	228.7	
Shilongba	石龙坝镇	18,000	315.4	
Xinzhuang Lisu and Dai Ethnic Township	新庄傈僳族傣族乡	17,526	276.6	
Tongda Lisu Ethnic Township	通达傈僳族乡	8,317	151.7	
Yongxing Lisu Ethnic Township	永兴傈僳族乡	12,844	314.6	
Chuanfang Lisu and Dai Ethnic Township	船房傈僳族傣族乡	9,685	173.6	

== Geography ==
Huaping County lies at the northwestern of Yunnan, bordering Yongsheng County to the west, Dayao County and Yongren County of Chuxiong Yi Autonomous Prefecture to the south, Ninglang Yi Autonomous County to the north, and Panzhihua (Xi District, Renhe District and Yanbian County) to the east. The county has a total area of 2,200-square-kilometre (850 sq mi).

The average altitude of the county is 1,160-metre (3,810 ft). The highest point in Huaping County is Pidi Liangzi (匹底梁子) which stands 3,198-metre (10,492 ft) above sea level. The lowest point is Tangba Estuary (塘坝河口), which, at 1,015-metre (3,330 ft) above sea level.

=== Rivers ===
The Xinzhuang River and Wumu River, tributaries of the Jinsha River, winds through Huaping County.

=== Climate ===
Huaping County experiences a subtropical low heat valley climate, with an average annual temperature of 19.8 °C (67.6 °F), total annual rainfall of 870-millimetre (34 in), and a frost-free period of 303.2 days.

Climate data for Huaping, elevation 1,231 m (4,039 ft), (1991–2020 normals, extremes 1981–present)
Month	Jan	Feb	Mar	Apr	May	Jun	Jul	Aug	Sep	Oct	Nov	Dec	Year
Record high °C (°F)	29.3 (84.7)	32.1 (89.8)	36.2 (97.2)	38.9 (102.0)	40.5 (104.9)	41.8 (107.2)	39.9 (103.8)	35.9 (96.6)	34.8 (94.6)	32.7 (90.9)	32.7 (90.9)	27.9 (82.2)	41.8 (107.2)
Mean daily maximum °C (°F)	21.7 (71.1)	24.9 (76.8)	28.5 (83.3)	31.3 (88.3)	32.3 (90.1)	31.9 (89.4)	30.2 (86.4)	29.9 (85.8)	28.1 (82.6)	26.5 (79.7)	23.6 (74.5)	21.0 (69.8)	27.5 (81.5)
Daily mean °C (°F)	11.8 (53.2)	15.4 (59.7)	19.7 (67.5)	23.1 (73.6)	25.0 (77.0)	25.5 (77.9)	24.4 (75.9)	23.8 (74.8)	22.1 (71.8)	19.7 (67.5)	15.2 (59.4)	11.7 (53.1)	19.8 (67.6)
Mean daily minimum °C (°F)	4.6 (40.3)	7.5 (45.5)	11.9 (53.4)	15.7 (60.3)	18.8 (65.8)	20.9 (69.6)	20.7 (69.3)	20.1 (68.2)	18.8 (65.8)	15.6 (60.1)	9.9 (49.8)	5.6 (42.1)	14.2 (57.5)
Record low °C (°F)	−1.3 (29.7)	1.4 (34.5)	1.3 (34.3)	8.1 (46.6)	11.1 (52.0)	13.5 (56.3)	14.9 (58.8)	14.3 (57.7)	10.9 (51.6)	8.8 (47.8)	2.5 (36.5)	−0.5 (31.1)	−1.3 (29.7)
Average precipitation mm (inches)	7.1 (0.28)	2.9 (0.11)	6.6 (0.26)	14.0 (0.55)	59.6 (2.35)	172.3 (6.78)	274.7 (10.81)	251.3 (9.89)	204.0 (8.03)	70.8 (2.79)	15.7 (0.62)	3.2 (0.13)	1,082.2 (42.6)
Average precipitation days (≥ 0.1 mm)	2.2	2.4	3.9	4.8	10.4	17.2	23.5	22.7	19.8	11.3	3.4	1.2	122.8
Average relative humidity (%)	57	44	37	39	50	66	78	79	80	77	71	68	62
Mean monthly sunshine hours	251.6	235.0	248.4	235.3	214.6	160.1	118.9	131.4	127.0	183.4	228.9	251.5	2,386.1
Percentage possible sunshine	76	74	66	61	51	39	28	33	35	52	71	78	55
Source: China Meteorological Administrationall-time November record high

== Economy ==
In 2020, the regional GDP of Huaping County reached 7.42 billion yuan, an increase of 16.5%, ranking the first in Yunnan. Among them, the added value of the primary industry was 1.01 billion yuan, an increase of 4%; the added value of the secondary industry was 3.62 billion yuan, an increase of 18.5%, the seventh fastest growth rate in Yunnan; the added value of the tertiary industry was 2.79 billion yuan, an increase of 18%, the fastest growth rate in Yunnan.

Huaping County's economy is based on agriculture, animal husbandry, tourism, and mineral resources. The main crops are rice, wheat, corn, potato and vegetable. Mango, walnut, pomegranate, citrus, Zanthoxylum, bamboo, peach, and pear are the economic plants of the county.

=== Mineral resources ===
Huaping County has an abundance of coal, iron, copper, granite, gypsum, kaolinite, bauxite, baryte, and feldspar.

== Demographics ==
=== Population ===
Population census
Year	Pop.	±%
1949	66,307	—
1953	74,010	+11.6%
1964	85,916	+16.1%
1982	128,572	+49.6%
1990	141,612	+10.1%
2017	159,695	+12.8%

As of 2020, the National Bureau of Statistics of the People's Republic of China estimates the county's population now to be 159,695. There are 26 nationalities live in the county, including Han, Lisu, Yi, Dai, Hui and Miao.

=== Language ===
Mandarin is the official language. The local people speak both Southwestern Mandarin and native language.

=== Religion ===
Most people in Huaping County believe in Theravada Buddhism, and a few believe in Taoism, Islam, Catholicism and Protestantism. Catholicism spread into the country as early as the Republic of China. French missionaries built four churches in the county.

== Education ==
As of 2015, Huaping County has three high schools (including one private school), one vocational high school, one teacher training school, three middle schools, 62 primary schools and 36 kindergartens (including 34 private schools).

== Tourism ==
Huaping County is famous for its beautiful natural scenery, including Dragon Palace Cave (龙宫洞), Fairy Cave (仙人洞), Carp River Water Conservancy Scenic Spot (鲤鱼河水利风景区), and Fruit Mountain Scenic Spot (果子山景区). Two public parks are located in the county: Zhongxin Martyrs Memorial Park (中心烈士陵园) and Yongxing Martyrs Memorial Park (永兴烈士陵园).

== Transportation ==
The G4216 Expressway, also known as "Rong–Li Expressway", connects the county to Yongsheng County to the west, and Panzhihua to the east.

The China National Highway 353 is a major east-southwest highway that runs through the central county and intersects with the G4216 Expressway in the town of Rongjiang.
