= Chuanfang Lisu and Dai Ethnic Township =

Chuanfang Lisu and Dai Ethnic Township 船房傈僳族傣族乡
- Ethnic township
- Location in Yunnan.
- Coordinates: 26°49′56″N 101°19′28″E
- Country: People's Republic of China
- Province: Yunnan
- Prefecture-level city: Lijiang
- County: Huaping County
- Incorporated (township): 1988

Area
  - Total: 173.6 km^{2} (67.0 sq mi)

Population (2017)
  - Total: 9,685
  - Density: 55.79/km^{2} (144.5/sq mi)
- Time zone: UTC+08:00 (China Standard)
- Postal code: 674805
- Area code: 0888

Chuanfang Lisu and Dai Ethnic Township (simplified Chinese: 船房傈僳族傣族乡; traditional Chinese: 船房傈僳族傣族鄉; pinyin: Chuánfáng Lìsùzú Dǎizú Xiāng) is an ethnic township in County, Yunnan, China. As of 2017, it has a population of 9,685 and an area of 173.6 square kilometres (67.0 sq mi).

== Administrative division ==
As of 2016, the township is divided into four villages:

- Chuanfang (船房村)
- Huarong (华荣村)
- Huiwo (灰窝村)
- Jiaju (嘎苴村)

== History ==
It used to be in the territory of the Yuan dynasty (1271–1368).

In 1909, Huaping County was set up and this region was county seat.

During the Republic of China, it belonged to Yulu Township (玉鹿乡).

After the establishment of the Communist State, in 1950, it belonged to the 5th District. In 1961, its name was changed to Huarong People's Commune (华荣人民公社) and then merged into the Yongxing District (永兴区). The Chuanfang Lisu and Dai Ethnic Township was established in 1988.

== Geography ==
The township lies at the northeastern of Huaping County, bordering Yongxing Lisu Ethnic Township and Zhongxin Town to the west, the town of Xingquan to the south, and Yanbian County to the east and northeast. The highest point in the township is Guangtou Mountain (光头山) which stands 2,735 metres (8,973 ft) above sea level. The lowest point is Huiwotangfang (灰窝塘房), which, at 1,320 metres (4,330 ft) above sea level.

The Wumu River (乌木河) flows through the township.

=== Climate ===
The township enjoys a subtropical semi humid climate, with an average annual temperature of 19.8 °C (67.6 °F) and total annual rainfall of 1,066.6-millimetre (41.99 in).

== Economy ==
The economy is supported primarily by farming, animal husbandry and mineral resources. The main crops are rice, wheat and corn. Economic crops are mainly zanthoxylum, tea, walnut, loquat, persimmon, and citrus. The region also has an abundance of coal, granite and limestone.

== Demographics ==
Population census
Year	Pop.	±%
1990	10,411	—
2007	10,056	−3.4%
2017	9,685	−3.7%

As of 2017, the National Bureau of Statistics of China estimates the township's population to be 9,685.
