= Datian, Sichuan =

Datian 大田镇
- Town
- Datianzhen
- Location in Sichuan
- Coordinates: 26°18′46″N 101°46′43″E
- Country: People's Republic of China
- Province: Sichuan
- Autonomous prefecture: Panzhihua
- County: Renhe District

Area
  - Total: 122.2 km^{2} (47.2 sq mi)

Population (2010)
  - Total: 7,999
  - Density: 65.46/km^{2} (169.5/sq mi)
- Time zone: UTC+8 (China Standard)

Datian (Mandarin: 大田镇) is a town in Renhe District, Panzhihua, Sichuan, China. In 2010, Datian had a total population of 7,999: 4,086 males and 3,913 females: 1,236 aged under 14, 5,871 aged between 15 and 65 and 892 aged over 65.

== See also ==
- List of township-level divisions of Sichuan
