= Yongxing Lisu Ethnic Township =

Yongxing Lisu Ethnic Township 永兴傈僳族乡
- Ethnic township
- Location in Yunnan.
- Coordinates: 26°50′41″N 101°13′20″E
- Country: People's Republic of China
- Province: Yunnan
- Prefecture-level city: Lijiang
- County: Huaping County
- Incorporated (township): 1988

Area
  - Total: 314.6 km^{2} (121.5 sq mi)

Population (2017)
  - Total: 12,844
  - Density: 40.83/km^{2} (105.7/sq mi)
- Time zone: UTC+08:00 (China Standard)
- Postal code: 674805
- Area code: 0888

Yongxing Lisu Ethnic Township (simplified Chinese: 永兴傈僳族乡; traditional Chinese: 永興傈僳族鄉; pinyin: Yǒngxīng Lìsùzú Xiāng) is an ethnic township in Huaping County, Yunnan, China. As of the 2017 statistics it had a population of 12,844 and an area of 314.6-square-kilometre (121.5 sq mi).

== Administrative division ==
As of 2016, the township is divided into seven villages:

- Yongxing (永兴村)
- Xihao (习好村)
- Anke (安科村)
- Jidu (基度村)
- Bashan (坝山村)
- Simu (思木村)
- Malu (马鹿村)

== History ==
During the Jiaqing period (1796–1820) of the Qing dynasty (1644–1911), there is a street named "Abili" (阿比里). The street was demolished in a peasant uprising in 1893. Later, Guo Yongxing (郭永兴), a local people, founded a new street in the former village of Dagutian (大谷田村). To commemorate him, the street was named "Yongxing Street" (永兴街).

During the early Republic of China, it belonged to the North District. In 1931, it came under the jurisdiction of the 6th District. The Yulu Township (玉鹿乡; 'Jade Deer Township') was set up in 1937.

After the establishment of the Communist State, in 1950, it belonged to the 5th District. In 1961, it was split into two communes which named "Yongxing People's Commune" (永兴人民公社) and "Huarong People's Commune" (华荣人民公社). It became a district in 1983. In 1988, the Yongxing District was revoked and split into two townships, namely the Yongxing Lisu Ethnic Township and Chuanfang Lisu and Dai Ethnic Township.

== Geography ==
The township lies at the northwestern of Huaping County, bordering Zhanhe Town of Ninglang Yi Autonomous County to the west, Zhongxin Town and Chuanfang Lisu and Dai Ethnic Township to the south, Paomahe Township and Chanzhanhe Township of Ninglang Yi Autonomous County to the north, and Yanbian County of Sichuan to the east.

== Economy ==
The principal industries in the area are agriculture, animal husbandry and mineral resources. Significant crops include rice, wheat, corn, and tomato. Commercial crops include tobacco, tea, Zanthoxylum, bamboo, walnut, Prinsepia utilis, Castanea mollissima, and ginger. The region abounds with coal.

== Demographics ==
Population census
Year	Pop.	±%
1990	14,244	—
2017	12,844	−9.8%

As of 2017, the National Bureau of Statistics of China estimates the township's population now to be 12,844.

== Tourist attractions ==
The Yongxing Waterfall is a popular attraction in the township. It is also known for the Longshan Temple (龙山庙; 'Dragon Mountain Temple').
