= Rongjiang, Huaping County =

Rongjiang 荣将镇
- Town
- Location in Yunnan.
- Coordinates: 26°34′38″N 101°16′33″E
- Country: People's Republic of China
- Province: Yunnan
- Prefecture-level city: Lijiang
- County: Huaping County
- Designated (town): 1931

Area
  - Total: 412.9 km^{2} (159.4 sq mi)

Population (2017)
  - Total: 33,450
  - Density: 81.01/km^{2} (209.8/sq mi)
- Time zone: UTC+08:00 (China Standard)
- Postal code: 674802
- Area code: 0888

Rongjiang (simplified Chinese: 荣将镇; traditional Chinese: 榮將鎮; pinyin: Róngjiāng Zhèn) is a town in Huaping County, Yunnan, China. As of the 2017 statistics it had a population of 33,450 and an area of 412.9-square-kilometre (159.4 sq mi).

== Administrative division ==
As of 2016, the town is divided into one community and eight villages:

- Rongjiang Community (荣将社区)
- Gaoze (膏泽村)
- He'ai (和爱村)
- Zheli (哲里村)
- Longtou (龙头村)
- Hongdi (宏地村)
- Wenquan (温泉村)
- Lashi (腊石村)
- Hongchunjing (红椿箐村)

== History ==
Rongjiang was known as "Shijia Village" (十甲村) in ancient times.

In 1821, in the ruling of Daoguang Emperor of the Qing dynasty (1644–1911), a general defeated the Tusi of Surname Gao (高氏土司), hence the name "Yingjiang Village" (赢将村; 'Village of Winning General'). Later, it was mistakenly written as "Yingjiang Village" (荣将村) with the similar pronunciation.

After the founding of the Republic of China in 1912, it came under the jurisdiction of the South District (南区). It became a town in 1931 with the name of "Huanan" (华南镇). Its name was changed to "Gaoze" (膏泽镇) in 1937.

In 1956, it belonged to the 3rd District. It was renamed "Rongjiang People's Commune" (荣将人民公社) in 1958, "Wenquan People's Commune" (温泉人民公社) in 1961, and later "Hongwei People's Commune" (红卫人民公社) in 1966. It became a district in 1984 and was revoked in 1988, while it was split into Rongjiang (荣将镇) and Wenquan Yi and Lisu Ethnic Township (温泉彝族傈僳族乡).

== Geography ==
The town is situated in the central and southern part of Huaping County. The lowest altitude is 1,080-metre (3,540 ft) and the highest is 2,502-metre (8,209 ft).

The town has a total of four reservoirs.

The Liyu River (鲤鱼河), Xinzhuang River (新庄河) and Zheli River (哲里河) flow through the town.

== Economy ==
The region's economy is based on agriculture, fishing, and nearby mineral resources. The main crops of the region are rice, followed by corn, potato and wheat. Mango and walnut are the economic plants of this region. The region abounds with coal and limestone.

== Demographics ==
Population census
Year	Pop.	±%
1990	22,237	—
2006	28,450	+27.9%
2017	33,450	+17.6%

As of 2017, the National Bureau of Statistics of China estimates the town's population now to be 33,450. The main ethnic groups in the town are Yi, Zhuang, Dai, Miao, and Nakhi.

== Transportation ==
The G4216 Expressway is a west–east highway in the town.

The China National Highway 353 passes across the town, heading north to the town of Zhongxin.
