= Xinzhuang Lisu and Dai Ethnic Township =

Xinzhuang Lisu and Dai Ethnic Township 新庄傈僳族傣族乡
- Ethnic township
- Location in Yunnan.
- Coordinates: 26°35′06″N 101°11′30″E
- Country: People's Republic of China
- Province: Yunnan
- Prefecture-level city: Lijiang
- County: Huaping County
- Incorporated (township): 1937

Area
  - Total: 276.6 km^{2} (106.8 sq mi)

Population (2017)
  - Total: 17,526
  - Density: 63.36/km^{2} (164.1/sq mi)
- Time zone: UTC+08:00 (China Standard)
- Postal code: 674804
- Area code: 0888

Xinzhuang Lisu and Dai Ethnic Township (simplified Chinese: 新庄傈僳族傣族乡; traditional Chinese: 新莊傈僳族傣族鄉; pinyin: Xīnzhuāng Lìsùzú Dǎizú Xiāng) is an ethnic township in Huaping County, Yunnan, China. As of the 2017 statistics it had a population of 17,526 and an area of 276.6-square-kilometre (106.8 sq mi).

== Administrative division ==
As of 2016, the township is divided into seven villages:

- Xinzhuang (新庄村)
- Tianxing (天星村)
- Bian'ao (边凹村)
- Bade (八德村)
- Liangma (良马村)
- Desheng (德胜村)
- Lame (腊么村)

== History ==
In the Daoguang period (1821–1850) of the Qing dynasty (1644–1911), there is a house named "Xinzhuang" (新庄). Since then, more and more people settled down and formed a market.

In 1931, it belonged to the 5th District. The Xinbang Township (新邦乡) was set up in 1937.

After the establishment of the Communist State, in 1951, Xinabng Township and Qilian Township (七连乡) merged to form the 4th District. In 1958, it was renamed "Xinzhuang People's Commune" (新庄人民公社). Its name was changed to "Xinzhuang District" (新庄区) in 1983. In 1988, Xinzhuang Township (新庄乡) separated from the district.

== Geography ==
The township is situated at the western Huaping County.

The Liangma River (良马河), Bian'ao River (边凹河) and Xinzhuang River (新庄河) converged in this area.

== Economy ==
The region's economy is based on agriculture, animal husbandry, and nearby mineral resources. Vegetable, Dendrocalamus latiflorus and tobacco are the mainly economic plants of this region. Other commercial crops include citrus, walnut, zanthoxylum, mango. The region also has an abundance of coal, granite, limestone, kaolinite, feldspar, talc, gypsum, iron, and copper.

== Demographics ==
Population census
Year	Pop.	±%
1990	17,275	—
2017	17,526	+1.5%

As of 2017, the National Bureau of Statistics of China estimates the township's population now to be 17,526. There are 10 ethnic groups in the town, such as Yi, Dai, Miao, Nakhi, and Lisu.

== Transportation ==
The township is connected to two highways: the China National Highway 353 and G4216 Expressway.
