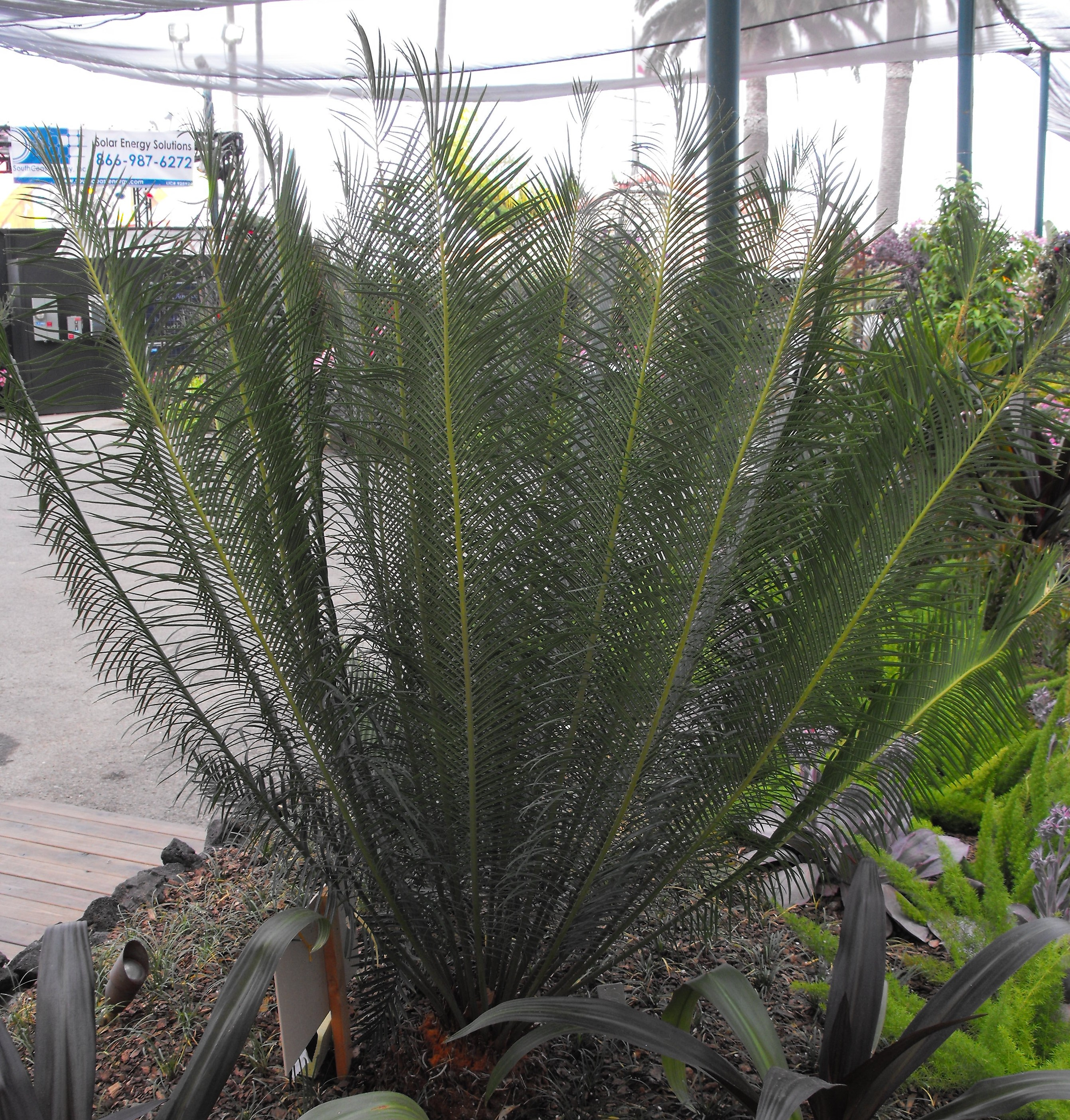
- On display at the San Diego County Fair in 2009

Conservation status
- Vulnerable (IUCN 3.1)

Scientific classification
- Kingdom: Plantae
- Clade: Embryophytes
- Clade: Tracheophytes
- Clade: Gymnosperms
- Division: Cycadophyta
- Class: Cycadopsida
- Order: Cycadales
- Family: Cycadaceae
- Genus: Cycas
- Species: C. panzhihuaensis

Binomial name
- Cycas panzhihuaensis L. Zhou & S. Y. Yang

Synonyms
- Cycas baguanheensis L. K. Fu & S. Z. Cheng.

= Cycas panzhihuaensis =

Dukou sago palm

Species of cycad

Cycas panzhihuaensis is a rare and vulnerable species of cycad known in the wild only from Sichuan and Yunnan provinces in China. It can be seen at the South China Botanical Garden in Guangzhou and is also cultivated for horticulture, where it is often known as the Dukou sago palm.

== Range ==
In China, Cycas panzhihuaensis is found in:

- Sichuan province: Ningnan County and Panzhihua [Dukou 渡口] (Baguan River and Jinsha River area)
- Yunnan province: Huaping County and Yuanmou County. Populations in Luquan County are shrinking.

== Description ==
The species is similar to C. pectinata Buchanan-Hamilton but can be distinguished by its unbranched trunk and smaller seeds (up to 3.5 cm long).

Cycas panzhihuaensis L. Zhou & S. Y. Yang in L. Zhou et al., Acta Phytotax. Sin. 19: 335. 1981.
