= Hemenkou Subdistrict =

Hemenkou Subdistrict 河门口街道
- Subdistrict
- Location in Sichuan
- Coordinates: 26°35′46″N 101°35′27″E
- Country: People's Republic of China
- Province: Sichuan
- Prefecture-level city: Panzhihua
- District: Xi District
- Time zone: UTC+8 (China Standard)

Hemenkou Subdistrict (Chinese: 河门口街道; pinyin: Héménkǒu Jiēdào) is a subdistrict in Xi District, Panzhihua, Sichuan, China. As of 2020, it has two residential neighborhoods under its administration:

- Hemenkou Community
- Sutie Community (苏铁社区)

== See also ==
- List of township-level divisions of Sichuan
