= Qingxiangping Subdistrict =

Qingxiangping Subdistrict 清香坪街道
- Subdistrict
- Location in Sichuan
- Coordinates: 26°35′49″N 101°38′4″E
- Country: People's Republic of China
- Province: Sichuan
- Prefecture-level city: Panzhihua
- District: Xi District
- Time zone: UTC+8 (China Standard)

Qingxiangping Subdistrict (Chinese: 清香坪街道; pinyin: Qīngxiāngpíng Jiēdào) is a subdistrict in Xi District, Panzhihua, Sichuan, China. As of 2020, it has six residential neighborhoods under its administration:

- Yangjiaping Community (杨家坪社区)
- Dashuijing Community (大水井社区)
- Lubei Community (路北社区)
- Lunan Community (路南社区)
- Jinsha Community (金沙社区)
- Zhixue Community (智学社区)

== See also ==
- List of township-level divisions of Sichuan
