= Yuquan Subdistrict, Panzhihua =

Yuquan Subdistrict 玉泉街道
- Subdistrict
- Location in Sichuan
- Coordinates: 26°35′59″N 101°36′11″E
- Country: People's Republic of China
- Province: Sichuan
- Prefecture-level city: Panzhihua
- District: Xi District
- Time zone: UTC+8 (China Standard)

Yuquan Subdistrict (Chinese: 玉泉街道; pinyin: Yùquán Jiēdào) is a subdistrict in Xi District, Panzhihua, Sichuan, China. As of 2020, it has four residential neighborhoods under its administration:

- Baguanhe Community (巴关河社区)
- Donglizhan Community (动力站社区)
- Xicaoping Community (席草坪社区)
- Heshiba Community (河石坝社区)

== See also ==
- List of township-level divisions of Sichuan
