= Panzhihua Baoanying Airport =

Panzhihua Baoanying Airport 攀枝花保安营机场
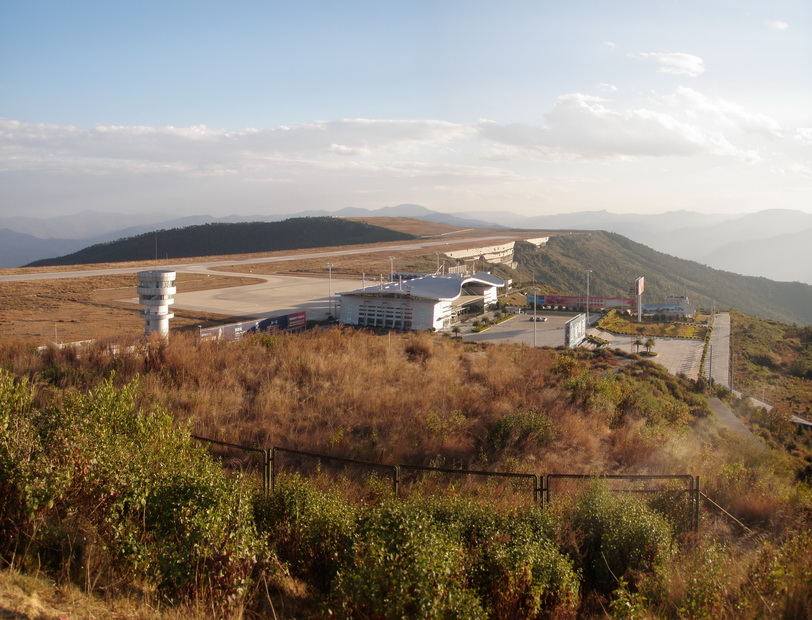
- IATA: PZI; ICAO: ZUZH

Summary
- Airport type: Public
- Serves: Panzhihua, Sichuan
- Location: Dong District
- Elevation AMSL: 1,976 m (6,483 ft)
- Coordinates: 26°32′32.33″N 101°47′54.67″E

Map
- Location of airport in Sichuan

Runways
Direction	Length		Surface
Direction	m	ft	Surface
02/20	2,800	9,186	Concrete

Statistics (2021)
- Passengers: 336,726
- Aircraft movements: 4,534
- Cargo (metric tons): 1,731.1

Panzhihua Baoanying Airport
- Simplified Chinese: 攀枝花保安营机场
- Traditional Chinese: 攀枝花保安營機場
Transcriptions
Standard Mandarin
- Hanyu Pinyin: Pānzhīhuā Bǎoānyíng Jīchǎng

Panzhihua Baoanying Airport (IATA: PZI, ICAO: ZUZH) is an airport serving the city of Panzhihua in China's Sichuan province. The mountaintop airport was opened in December 2003. Construction of the airport began in 2000 and cost a total of 1.1 billion yuan. The airport was closed on 25 June 2011 after a major landslide, and was reopened on 29 June 2013 after two years of repair.

== Location ==
The Panzhihua Baoanying Airport is located on the top of a mountain 1,976 m (6,483 ft) above sea level and approximately 1,000 m (3,300 ft) above the city. Panzhihua, being located in a steep valley of the Jinsha River, does not have a naturally suitable location for an airport. In order to construct the mountaintop airport, backfill up to 123 m (404 ft) deep was trucked in with a volume of at least 58,000,000 m^{3} (76,000,000 cu yd). Despite being only 8 km (5.0 mi) from the city centre, the road to the airport is 24 km (15 mi) long as it utilizes switchbacks to ascend the mountain. Despite the airport's relative young age, discussions have been ongoing since 2017 on relocating the airport as its current location cannot accommodate further expansion.

== Airlines and destinations ==
Airlines	Destinations
Air China	Chengdu–Shuangliu
Beijing Capital Airlines	Beijing–Daxing
China Southern Airlines	Guangzhou
Sichuan Airlines	Xi'an

== See also ==
- List of airports in China
- List of the busiest airports in China
