= Yumen =

Yumen may refer to:

- Yumen Pass, pass of the Great Wall of China
- Yumen City, county-level city in Jiuquan, Gansu, China, named after the pass
- Yumen, Sichuan (渔门), a town in Yanbian County, Sichuan, China
