= Taojiadu Subdistrict =

Taojiadu Subdistrict 陶家渡街道
- Subdistrict
- Location in Sichuan
- Coordinates: 26°35′23″N 101°34′30″E
- Country: People's Republic of China
- Province: Sichuan
- Prefecture-level city: Panzhihua
- District: Xi District
- Time zone: UTC+8 (China Standard)

Taojiadu Subdistrict (Chinese: 陶家渡街道; pinyin: Táojiādù Jiēdào) is a subdistrict in Xi District, Panzhihua, Sichuan, China. As of 2020, it has four residential neighborhoods under its administration:

- Kuangjian Community (矿建社区)
- Baoding Community (宝鼎社区)
- Huashan Community (花山社区)
- Taiping Community (太平社区)

== See also ==
- List of township-level divisions of Sichuan
