= 1981 Chengdu–Kunming rail crash =

Railway accident in Sichuan, China

Coordinates: 29.205143°N 102.885504°E

1981 Chengdu–Kunming railway crash
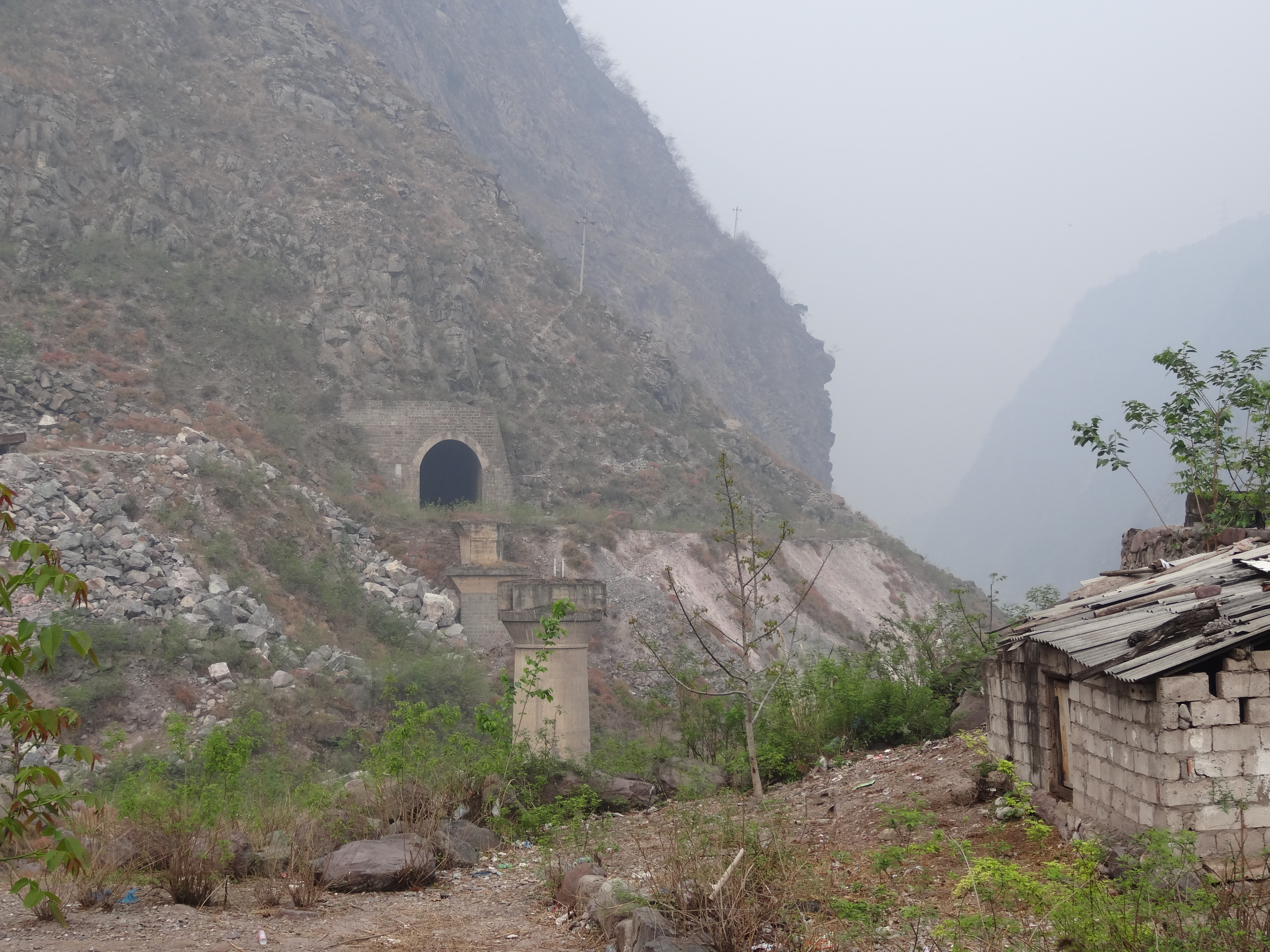
- The ruin of Liziyida bridge, near Ganluo County

Details
- Date: July 9, 1981; 01:47 CST; 17:47 UTC
- Location: Liziyida bridge near Ganluo County, Sichuan province
- Country: People's Republic of China
- Line: Chengdu–Kunming Railway
- Operator: China Railways, Sichuan Railway Group
- Incident type: Bridge failure
- Cause: Mudslide

Statistics
- Trains: 1
- Deaths: 240, 275 or 360
- Injured: 146
Route map

The 1981 Chengdu–Kunming rail crash occurred on July 9, 1981, when train number 442 passed the failed Liziyida bridge near Ganluo County, Sichuan province. More than 200 died in the accident while 146 were injured. It is the worst train disaster in the history of the People's Republic of China.

== Crash ==
At 1:30 a.m., a mudslide (Flow velocity up to 13.2m/s, bulk weight up to 2.32t/m3, containing a large number of boulders, dozens with a diameter of over eight meters) occurred at the Liziyida gully, a tributary of the Dadu River, destroying the 17-metre-high (56 ft), 110-metre-long (360 ft) Liziyida bridge. When the train was dispatched from Ganluo Station at 1:35 a.m., the local dispatcher sent the notice of departure but electricity suddenly cut out before the train fully left the station. The driver noticed this, but decided to continue as usual.

At 1:41 a.m., the number 442 passenger train consisting of two China Railway DF3 pulling 13 cars from Geliping to Chengdu was dispatched from the Niri station after passing Route 221 (another train operated on the opposite direction, from Chengdu to Jinjiang). A minute later, staffs of Niri station discovered that they had lost phone contact to the next station Wusi River station when reporting the departure of route 442.

At 1:45 a.m., the train entered the Nainaibao tunnel at a speed of 40 km/h (25 mph). After passing the tunnel curve, the driver Wang Mingru discovered that the building near the tunnel exit had collapsed and the light reflections from the rails were missing from the Liziyida bridge. He tried to make an emergency stop, but failed due to steep gradients of the rail before the bridge (at 14‰). As a result, the two diesel locomotives, baggage car No. 13, post office van No. 12, and passenger car No. 11 fell into the river. Passenger cars No. 10 and No. 9 crashed into the river bank. Passenger car No. 8 derailed in the tunnel and overturned outside of the tunnel exit.

== Effects ==
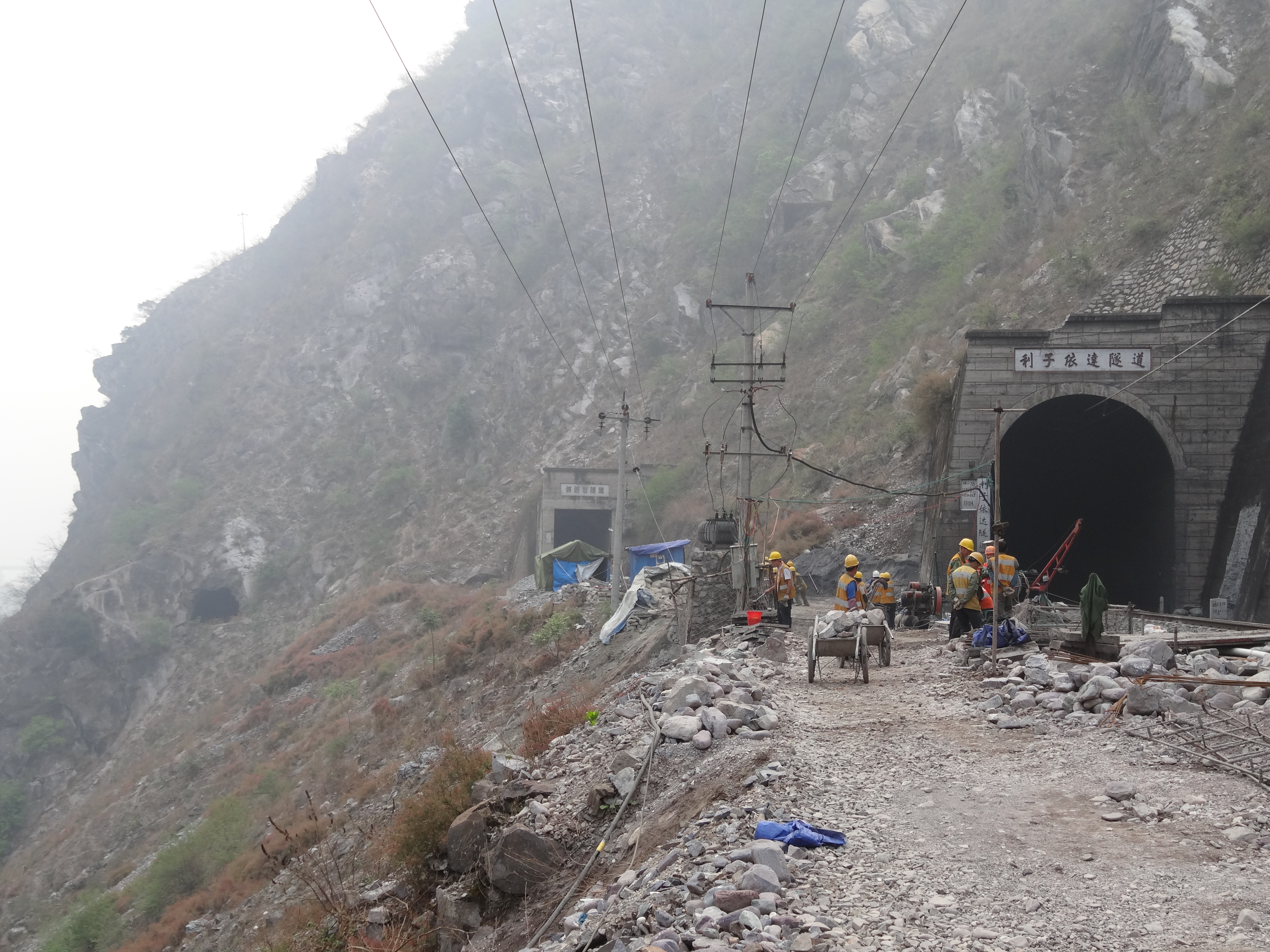
The new Liziyida tunnel under construction next to the abandoned Nainaibao tunnel

Depending on the source, there were 240, 275 or 360 people killed, including four crew-members. The railway was blocked until a temporary bridge was completed on July 24. After the opening of the new Liziyida tunnel in May 1984 bypassing the gully, the temporary bridge was dismantled and the Nainaibao tunnel was abandoned. The bridge piers still stand today.
