= China National Highway 350 =

Road in China

National Highway 350
- 350国道

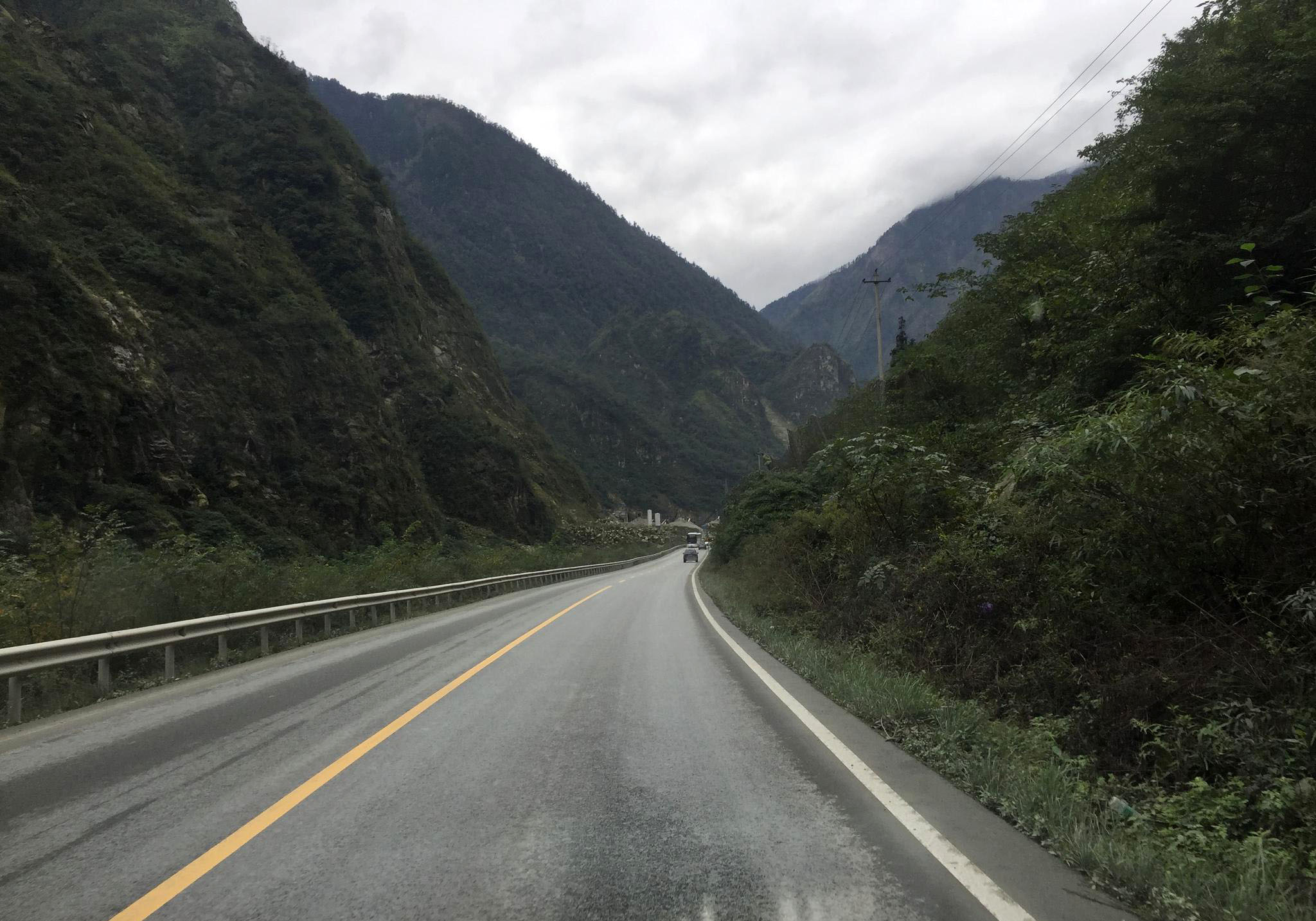
- In Wenchuan county

Major junctions
- From: Lichuan
- To: Luhuo

Location
- Country: China

Highway system
- National Trunk Highway System; Primary; Auxiliary
← G349	→ G351

China National Highway 350 runs from Lichuan, Hubei to Luhuo County in Sichuan. The last section in Sichuan is noted for its scenic route through mountainous landscape. In Zhong County, Chongqing, it crosses the Yangtze's Sanxia Reservoir over Zhongxian Yangtze River Bridge.

== Route ==
Province	Location	Distance
Hubei	Lichuan	0
Chongqing	Zhong County	
	Dianjiang County	
Sichuan	Linshui County	
	Huaying	
	Wenchuan County	
	Xiaojin County	
	Danba County	
	Dawu County	
	Luhuo County	

== See also ==
- China National Highways
