= Dabaoding Subdistrict =

Dabaoding Subdistrict 大宝鼎街道
- Subdistrict
- Location in Sichuan
- Coordinates: 26°35′27″N 101°36′46″E
- Country: People's Republic of China
- Province: Sichuan
- Prefecture-level city: Panzhihua
- District: Xi District
- Time zone: UTC+8 (China Standard)

Dabaoding Subdistrict (Chinese: 大宝鼎街道; pinyin: Dàbǎodǐng Jiēdào) is a subdistrict in Xi District, Panzhihua, Sichuan, China. As of 2020, it has two residential neighborhoods under its administration:

- Yanjiang Community (沿江社区)
- Xiaobaoding Community (小宝鼎社区)

== See also ==
- List of township-level divisions of Sichuan
