= China National Highway 352 =

National highway in China

National Highway 352
- 352国道

Major junctions
- From: Zhangjiajie, Hunan
- To: Qiaojia County, Yunnan

Location
- Country: China

Highway system
- National Trunk Highway System; Primary; Auxiliary
← G351	→ G353

China National Highway 352 is a partially completed highway in China. The highway runs from Zhangjiajie in Hunan to Qiaojia County in Yunnan. The highway crosses through the provinces of Hunan, Guizhou, Sichuan, and Yunnan.
