= Ba Manzi =

Chinese military general of the ancient Ba kingdom

- Chinese: 巴蔓子
Transcriptions
Standard Mandarin
- Hanyu Pinyin: Bā Mànzǐ

Ba Manzi was a Chinese military general of the ancient Ba kingdom in the Warring States period (475 BCE - 221 BCE) of China and a legendary hero in the folk cultures of Chongqing. His stories were recorded in the Chronicles of Huayang, which was written in the Jin dynasty.

Ba Manzi lived roughly in the 4th century BCE. He was a general guarding the town of Linjiang (near modern Zhong County), one of important towns in Ba's eastern frontier where there were many salt fields.

Shu, another ancient kingdom near Ba, attacked Wanzhou and supported a rebellion in Ba's capital city (near present-day Chongqing). The king of Ba ordered Ba Manzi to lead troops to reinforce the capital. Ba Manzi's army was not strong enough to fight both the rebellion and Shu kingdom at the same time, so Ba Manzi asked the Chu state for help. He made a promise to the king of Chu that he would cede three towns to Chu if Chu could help Ba put down the rebellion.

The king of Chu sent out his troops and helped Ba Manzi defeat the rebels and Shu army. After that, the king of Chu sent out an envoy to Ba to take over three towns. Ba Manzi told the Chu envoy that, as a general, he could not cede those three towns to another kingdom, but he was willing to compensate for his promises with his life. He then committed suicide by slitting his throat.

The Chu envoy took Ba Manzi's head back to his king. The king of Chu was so impressed by the bravery and loyalty that Ba Manzi showed that he had Ba Manzi's head buried with full honours. Ba Manzi's remains were transferred to Ba's capital and buried there. There is a memorial dedicated to Ba Manzi in present-day Yuzhong District, Chongqing.
