= Zhongxian Yangtze River Bridge =

Zhongxian Yangtze River Bridge 忠县长江大桥
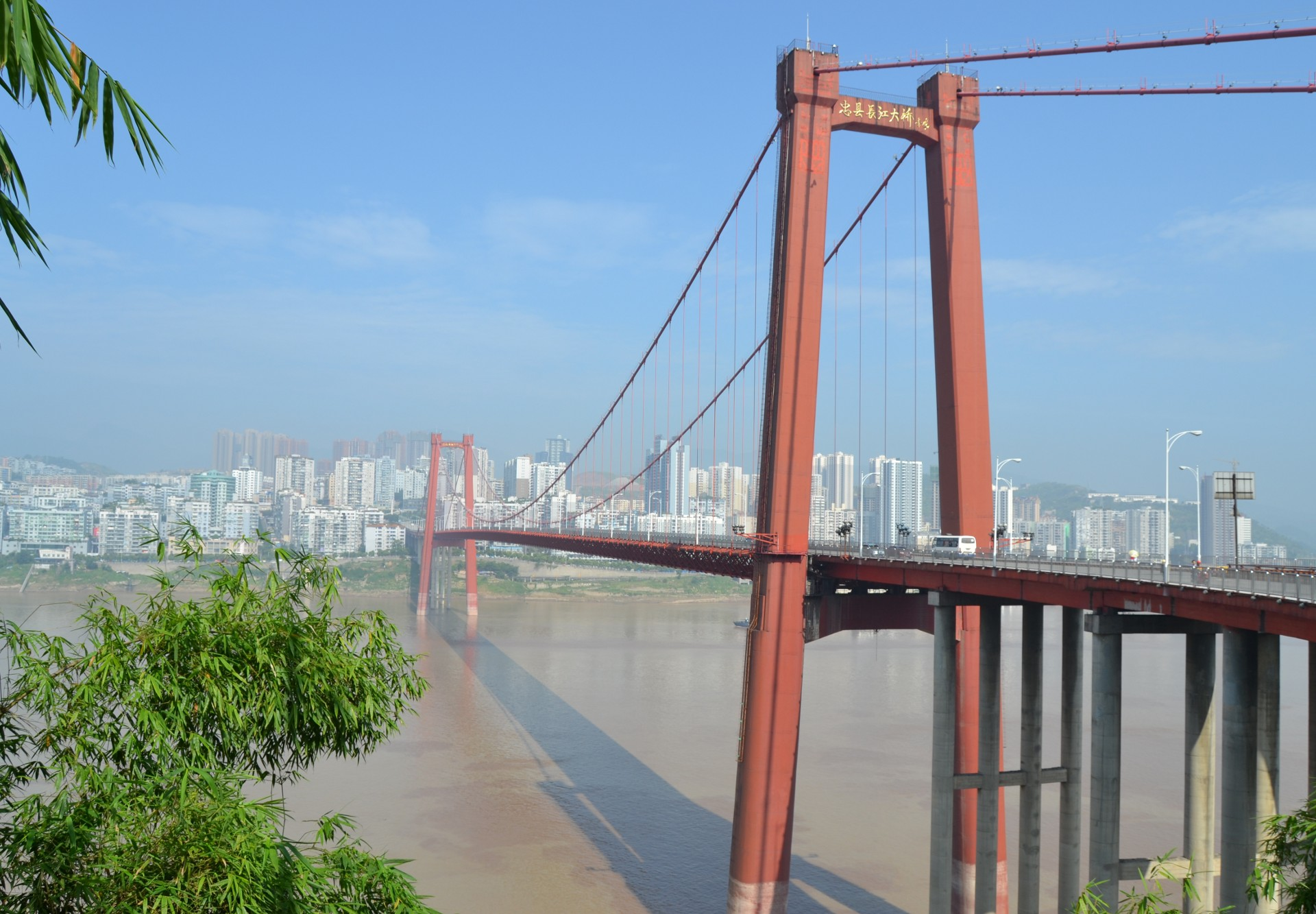
- Coordinates: 30.301833°N 108.049111°E
- Carries: China National Highway 350
- Crosses: Yangtze River
- Locale: Zhong County, Chongqing, China

Characteristics
- Design: Suspension Bridge
- Total length: 1,193.73 metres (3,916.4 ft)
- Width: 18 metres (59 ft)
- Height: 158 metres (518 ft)
- Longest span: 560 metres (1,840 ft)
- No. of spans: Yangtze River

History
- Construction cost: 246 million RMB
- Opened: September 10, 2001

Location
- Interactive map of Zhongxian Yangtze River Bridge

The Zhongxian Yangtze River Bridge is a suspension bridge over the Yangtze River in Zhong County of Chongqing, China. Completed in 2001, the bridge has a total length 1,199.73 metres (3,936.1 ft) including a longest span of 560 metres (1,840 ft), which places the bridge among the longest suspension spans in the world. In 2006, the bridge received the Lu Ban Award for engineering excellence.

== See also ==
- List of longest suspension bridge spans
- Yangtze River bridges and tunnels
