= China National Highway 353 =

National highway in China

National Highway 353
- 353国道

Route information
- Length: 3,797 km (2,359 mi)

Major junctions
- From: Ningde, Fujian
- To: Fugong County, Yunnan

Location
- Country: China

Highway system
- National Trunk Highway System; Primary; Auxiliary
← G352	→ G354

China National Highway 353 (G353) runs from Ningde, Fujian to Fugong County, Yunnan.

== Route and distance ==
City	Distance (km)
Xiapu County, Fujian	0
Zhouning County, Fujian	133
Zhenghe County, Fujian	208
Songxi County, Fujian	234
Pucheng County, Fujian	302
Guangfeng County, Jiangxi	387
Shangrao, Jiangxi	413
Hengfeng County, Jiangxi	455
Yiyang County, Jiangxi	473
Wannian County, Jiangxi	551
Yugan County, Jiangxi	594
Nanchang, Jiangxi	691
Anyi County, Jiangxi	746
Jing'an County, Jiangxi	770
Xiushui County, Jiangxi	907
Tongcheng County, Hubei	1005
Yueyang, Hunan	1085
Huarong County, Hunan	1115
Nan County, Hunan	1144
Anxiang County, Hunan	1172
Jinshi, Hunan	1235
Li County, Hunan	1250
Shimen County, Hunan	1294
Cili County, Hunan	1334
Zhangjiajie, Hunan	1442
Sangzhi County, Hunan	1493
Longshan County, Hunan	1623
Laifeng County, Hubei	1631
Xianfeng County, Hubei	1687
Qianjiang District, Chongqing	1738
Pengshui Miao and Tujia Autonomous County, Chongqing	1817
Wulong County, Chongqing	1885
Nanchuan District, Chongqing	1985
Wansheng District, Chongqing	2021
Hejiang County, Sichuan	2191
Luzhou, Sichuan	2237
Nanxi District, Yibin, Sichuan	2293
Yibin, Sichuan	2331
Pingshan County, Sichuan	2367
Suijiang County, Yunnan	2438
Leibo County, Sichuan	2559
Jinyang County, Sichuan	2736
Huidong County, Sichuan	2942
Huili County, Sichuan	2999
Yanbian County, Sichuan	3081
Panzhihua, Sichuan	3092
Yongsheng County, Yunnan	3260
Lijiang, Yunnan	3359
Weixi Lisu Autonomous County, Yunnan	3545
Fugong County, Yunnan	3797
