= Tongda Lisu Ethnic Township =

Tongda Lisu Ethnic Township 通达傈僳族乡
- Ethnic township
- Location in Yunnan.
- Coordinates: 26°36′50″N 101°03′22″E
- Country: People's Republic of China
- Province: Yunnan
- Prefecture-level city: Lijiang
- County: Huaping County
- Incorporated (township): 1988

Area
  - Total: 151.7 km^{2} (58.6 sq mi)

Population (2017)
  - Total: 8,317
  - Density: 54.83/km^{2} (142.0/sq mi)
- Time zone: UTC+08:00 (China Standard)
- Postal code: 674804
- Area code: 0888

Tongda Lisu Ethnic Township (simplified Chinese: 通达傈僳族乡; traditional Chinese: 通達傈僳族鄉; pinyin: Tōngdá Lìsùzú Xiāng) is an ethnic township in Huaping County, Yunnan, China. As of the 2017 statistics it had a population of 8,317 and an area of 151.7-square-kilometre (58.6 sq mi).

== Administrative division ==
As of 2016, the township is divided into five villages:

- Tongda (通达村)
- Weixin (维新村)
- Shuanglong (双龙村)
- Dingwang (丁王村)
- Baiguhe (白姑河村)

== History ==
During the early Republic of China, it belonged to the West District. The Qilian Township (七连乡) was set up in 1931.

After the establishment of the Communist State, in 1951, Xinabng Township (新邦乡) and Qilian Township merged to form the 4th District. In 1961, it was renamed "Xinzhuang People's Commune" (通达人民公社). Its name was changed to Tongda Lisu Ethnic Township in 1988.

== Geography ==
The township is situated at the western Huaping County. The highest point in the township stands 3,198.3 metres (10,493 ft) above sea level. The lowest point at 1,562 metres (5,125 ft) above sea level.

The Baigu River (白姑河村), Heitang River (黑塘河) and Weixing River (维兴河) flow through the township.

There are two reservoirs in the township, namely the Liangjiawan Reservoir (梁家湾水库) and Heitang Reservoir (黑塘水库).

=== Climate ===
The township is in the mountain cold temperate climate zone, with an average annual temperature of 11 to 16 °C (52 to 61 °F), a frost-free period of 90 days to 120 days and annual average sunshine hours in 2500 hours.

== Economy ==
The township's economy is based on agriculture, animal husbandry, and nearby mineral resources. The main crops are rice, wheat, corn, sweet potato and vegetable. Economic crops are mainly citrus, walnut, zanthoxylum, apple, peach, cherry, and plum. The region abounds with coal, granite, feldspar, clay, and gypsum.

== Demographics ==
Population census
Year	Pop.	±%
1990	8,048	—
2017	8,317	+3.3%

As of 2017, the National Bureau of Statistics of China estimates the township's population now to be 8,317.

== Transportation ==
The G4216 Expressway passes across the township.
