= Renhe District =

Renhe 仁和区
- District
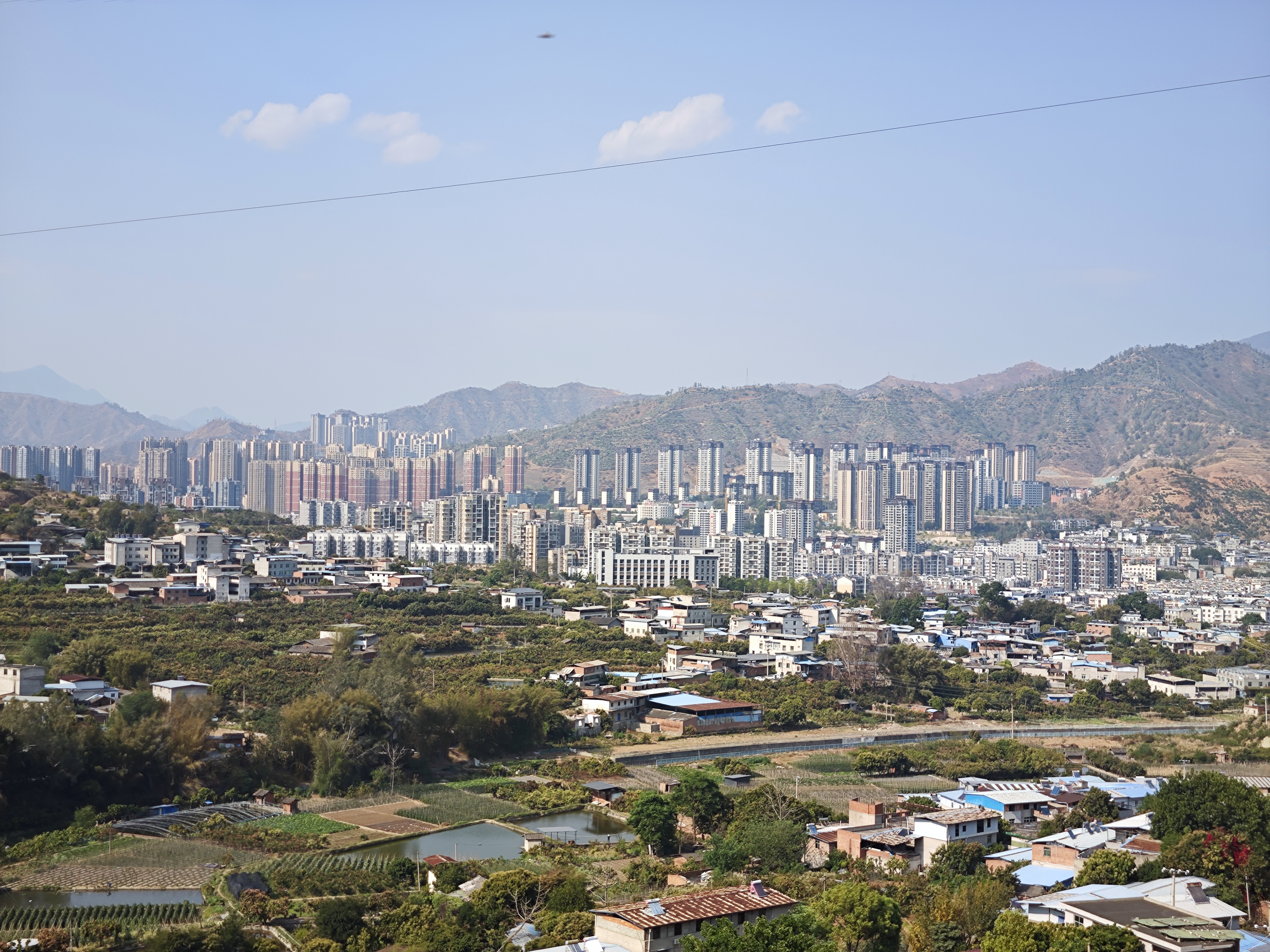

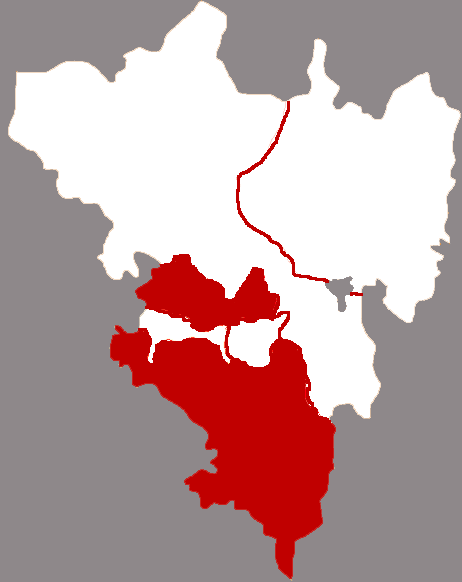

- Country: China
- Province: Sichuan
- Prefecture-level city: Panzhihua

Area
  - Total: 1,727 km^{2} (667 sq mi)

Population (2018)
  - Total: 276,000
  - Density: 160/km^{2} (414/sq mi)
- Time zone: UTC+8 (China Standard)

Renhe District (Chinese: 仁和区; pinyin: Rénhé Qū) is a district of the city of Panzhihua, Sichuan Province, China. It borders Huili to the east, Yongren County of Yunnan to the south, Huaping County of Yunnan to the west, and Yanbian County to the north.

== Administrative divisions ==
Renhe District comprises 1 subdistrict, 8 towns, 3 townships and 2 ethnic townships:

subdistrict

- Dahezhonglu Subdistrict 大河中路街道

towns

- Renhe Town 仁和镇
- Pingdi Town 平地镇
- Datian Town 大田镇
- Futian Town 福田镇
- Tongde Town 同德镇
- Jinjiang Town 金江镇
- Bude Town 布德镇
- Qianjin Town 前进镇

townships

- Taiping Township 太平乡
- Wuben Township 务本乡
- Zhongba Township 中坝乡

ethnic townships

- Dalongtan Yi Ethnic Township 大龙潭彝族乡
- Ala Yi Ethnic Township 啊喇彝族乡

== Climate ==
Climate data for Renhe (1991–2020 normals, extremes 1981–present)
Month	Jan	Feb	Mar	Apr	May	Jun	Jul	Aug	Sep	Oct	Nov	Dec	Year
Record high °C (°F)	31.0 (87.8)	33.0 (91.4)	37.2 (99.0)	39.5 (103.1)	40.8 (105.4)	39.7 (103.5)	39.1 (102.4)	36.6 (97.9)	36.6 (97.9)	34.7 (94.5)	32.8 (91.0)	29.2 (84.6)	40.8 (105.4)
Mean daily maximum °C (°F)	23.0 (73.4)	26.6 (79.9)	29.8 (85.6)	32.3 (90.1)	33.0 (91.4)	32.9 (91.2)	31.8 (89.2)	31.5 (88.7)	29.8 (85.6)	27.8 (82.0)	24.9 (76.8)	22.1 (71.8)	28.8 (83.8)
Daily mean °C (°F)	12.7 (54.9)	16.6 (61.9)	20.7 (69.3)	24.1 (75.4)	26.0 (78.8)	26.8 (80.2)	26.0 (78.8)	25.4 (77.7)	23.6 (74.5)	20.9 (69.6)	16.1 (61.0)	12.6 (54.7)	21.0 (69.7)
Mean daily minimum °C (°F)	5.8 (42.4)	9.0 (48.2)	13.1 (55.6)	16.9 (62.4)	20.0 (68.0)	22.0 (71.6)	21.9 (71.4)	21.3 (70.3)	19.8 (67.6)	16.5 (61.7)	10.6 (51.1)	6.7 (44.1)	15.3 (59.5)
Record low °C (°F)	0.0 (32.0)	2.5 (36.5)	1.1 (34.0)	7.3 (45.1)	11.7 (53.1)	14.5 (58.1)	17.4 (63.3)	15.3 (59.5)	12.4 (54.3)	9.4 (48.9)	3.0 (37.4)	−1.8 (28.8)	−1.8 (28.8)
Average precipitation mm (inches)	7.5 (0.30)	2.9 (0.11)	4.8 (0.19)	15.9 (0.63)	55.1 (2.17)	146.0 (5.75)	208.2 (8.20)	156.9 (6.18)	127.2 (5.01)	49.4 (1.94)	10.3 (0.41)	1.3 (0.05)	785.5 (30.94)
Average precipitation days (≥ 0.1 mm)	1.7	1.3	1.8	4.0	8.9	13.4	17.3	15.1	11.8	7.8	3.0	1.0	87.1
Average snowy days	0.1	0	0	0	0	0	0	0	0	0	0	0	0.1
Average relative humidity (%)	56	43	37	39	48	60	70	71	73	71	68	65	58
Mean monthly sunshine hours	234.4	245.2	271.6	263.9	242.7	189.4	165.7	169.1	153.3	184.5	204.7	200.9	2,525.4
Percentage possible sunshine	71	77	73	69	58	46	39	42	42	52	63	62	58
Source: China Meteorological Administrationall-time October record highall-time November record high
