= China National Highway 351 =

Highway in China

National Highway 351
- 351国道

Major junctions
- From: Taizhou, Zhejiang
- To: Xiaojin County, Sichuan

Location
- Country: China

Highway system
- National Trunk Highway System; Primary; Auxiliary
← G350	→ G352

China National Highway 351 is a partially completed highway in China. The highway starts at the Port of Taizhou and runs halfway across the country to Dawei, Xiaojin County. The highway passes through the provinces of Zhejiang, Jiangxi, Hubei, Chongqing, and Sichuan. In 2017, the provincial government of Zhejiang approved the construction of the Zhejiang section of the highway.
