= Zhong County =

Zhongxian 忠县
- County
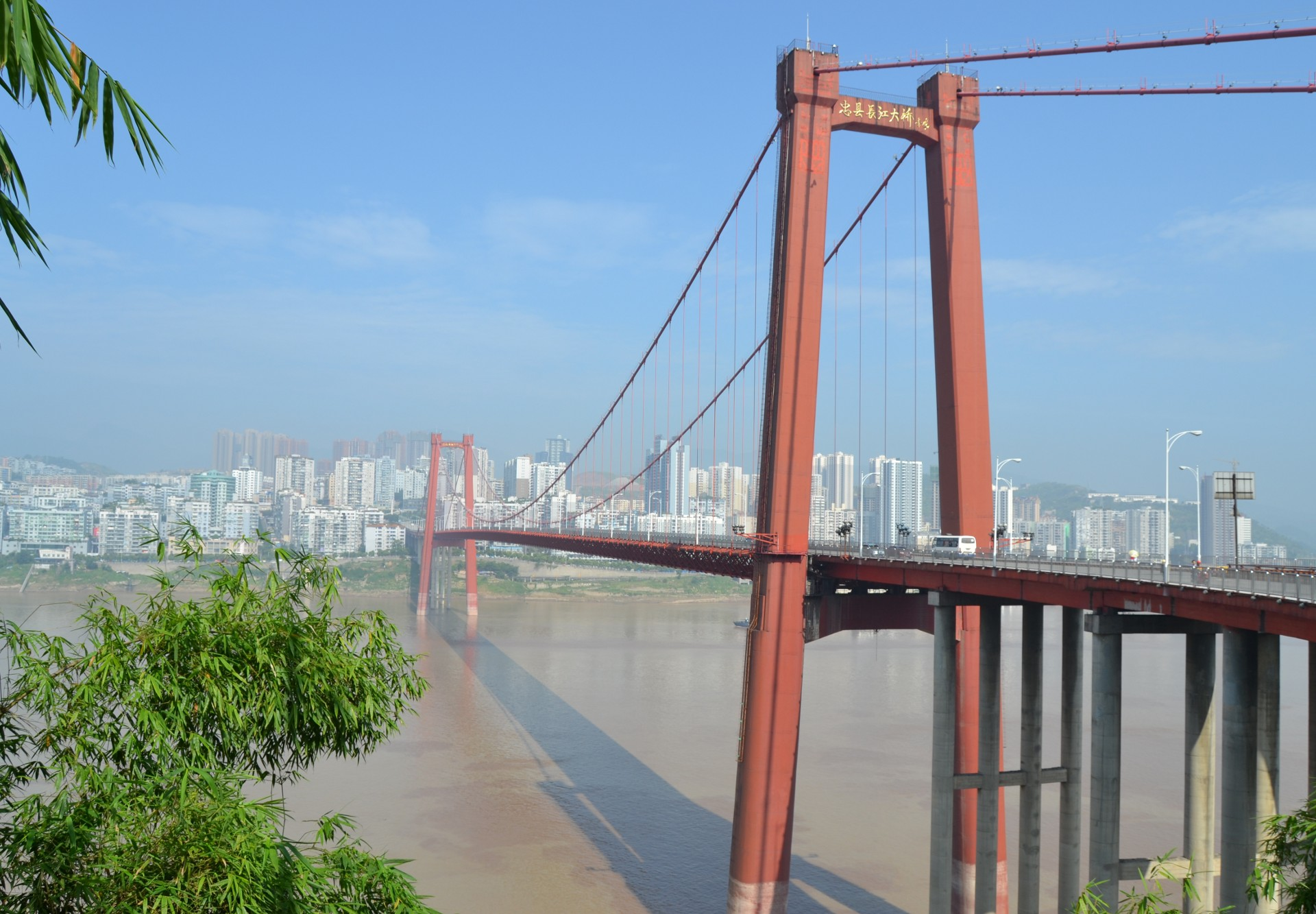
- Zhongxian Yangtze River Bridge

- Location of Zhong County in Chongqing
- Coordinates: 30°18′00″N 108°02′15″E
- Country: People's Republic of China
- Municipality: Chongqing

Area
  - Total: 2,184 km^{2} (843 sq mi)

Population (2010)
  - Total: 751,400
  - Density: 344.0/km^{2} (891.1/sq mi)
- Time zone: UTC+8 (China Standard)

Zhong County or Zhongxian (simplified Chinese: 忠县; traditional Chinese: 忠縣; pinyin: Zhōng Xiàn) is a county of Chongqing Municipality, China. The name "Zhong" (忠) means "loyalty." It is named after the historical story of General Ba Manzi, who chose to be killed to keep his Kingdom together. Emperor Li Shimin (李世民) of the Tang Dynasty named Zhong County "Loyalty County" to honor General Ba Manzi.

The Shibaozhai Temple, which was endangered by the rising waters caused by the Three Gorges Dam, is located there. Zhong County has two Yangtze River crossings: the Zhongxian Yangtze River Bridge and Zhongzhou Yangtze River Bridge.

== History ==
Linjiang County (临江县) was established under Ba Commandery (巴郡) in the Han dynasty. In Western Wei, Lin Prefecture (临州, Linzhou) was established, with Linjiang as its seat. In the Tang dynasty, it was renamed Zhong Prefecture (忠州, Zhongzhou, literally "loyal prefecture"). In 1913, Zhongzhou was replaced by Zhong County.

== Scenic places ==
Lord Bai's Memorial Hall is located in the west of Zhong county. It was built in honor of Bai Juyi. Bai was a well-known poet and influential minister of the Tang Dynasty (618-907).

Shibaozhai is one of the most well-known places in Zhong County and is located thirty-eight kilometers away from the main city of Zhong County. The local government constructed a protection in 2005 due to the rising water levels from the Three Gorges Dam and reopened it in 2009 for tourists.

Beacon of Three Kingdoms is Zhong county's most well-known new attraction stage. It is a live-action stage show based on the Three Kingdoms period, which was built in July 2013. The live stage features a three-dimensional projection with live horses and actors. It is about 7 miles away from the main city of Zhong County.

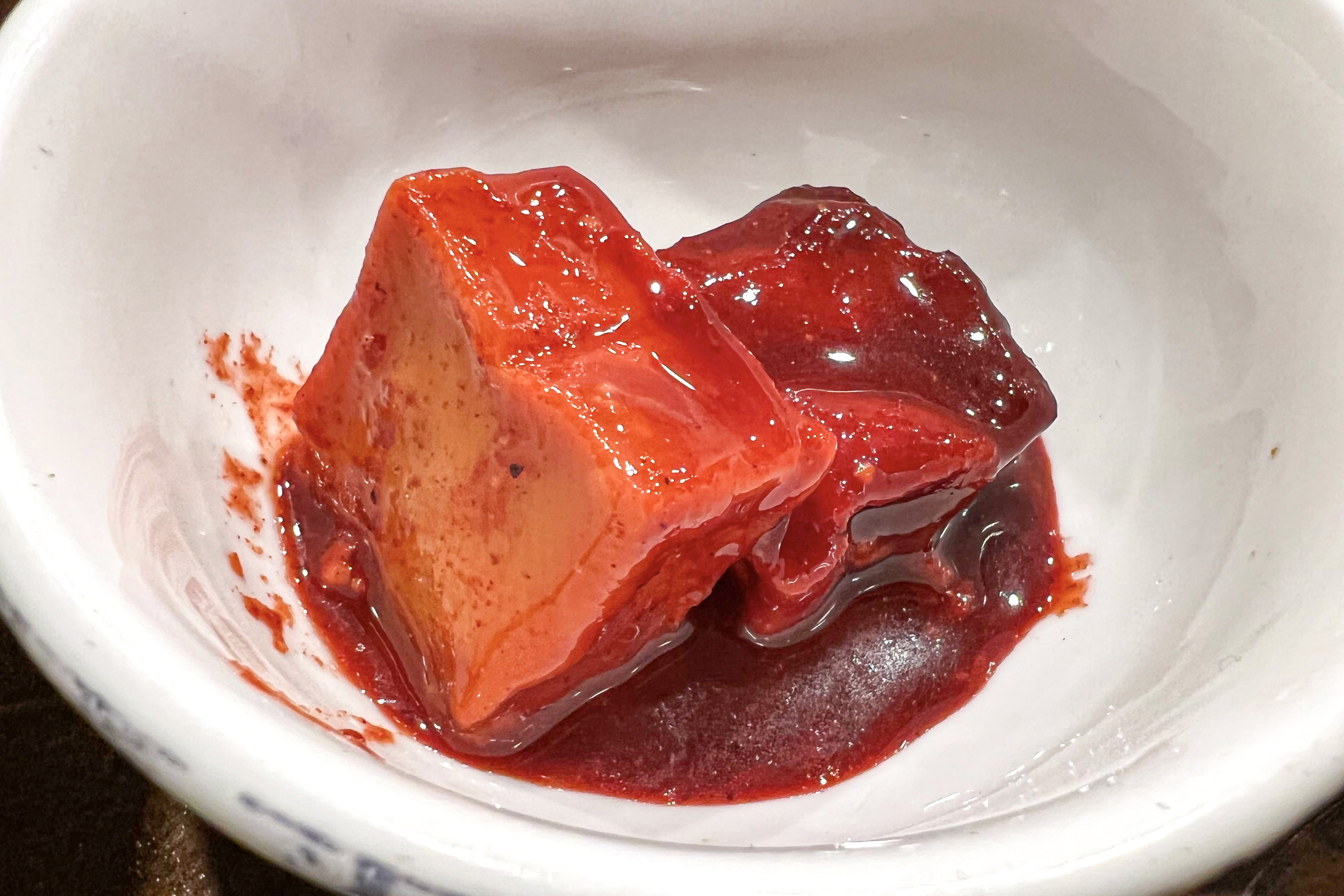
Fermented Bean Curd

== Water transportation ==
Zhong County water transportation provides cargo ships and ferry boats. There are cruise ships and small ferry boats in Zhong County water transportation. Cruise ships are convenient for traveling between cities along the Yangtze River, while small ferry boats provide more choices for getting around different towns in Zhong County. Zhong County's first 10,000-metric-ton port began operations on September 29, 2021. It is designed to handle vessels with a carrying capacity of up to 10,000 metric tons. This substantial capacity allows it to accommodate large cargo ships, facilitating the efficient movement of goods.

== Climate ==
Climate data for Zhongxian, elevation 326 m (1,070 ft), (1991–2020 normals, extremes 1981–present)
| Month | Jan | Feb | Mar | Apr | May | Jun | Jul | Aug | Sep | Oct | Nov | Dec | Year |
|---|---|---|---|---|---|---|---|---|---|---|---|---|---|
| Record high °C (°F) | 17.6 (63.7) | 25.3 (77.5) | 33.3 (91.9) | 36.8 (98.2) | 35.6 (96.1) | 38.3 (100.9) | 41.8 (107.2) | 42.6 (108.7) | 42.7 (108.9) | 36.3 (97.3) | 29.3 (84.7) | 17.5 (63.5) | 42.7 (108.9) |
| Mean daily maximum °C (°F) | 9.7 (49.5) | 12.8 (55.0) | 18.1 (64.6) | 23.5 (74.3) | 26.5 (79.7) | 29.2 (84.6) | 33.6 (92.5) | 33.9 (93.0) | 28.9 (84.0) | 22.1 (71.8) | 16.8 (62.2) | 10.7 (51.3) | 22.2 (71.9) |
| Daily mean °C (°F) | 7.3 (45.1) | 9.5 (49.1) | 13.7 (56.7) | 18.5 (65.3) | 21.8 (71.2) | 24.7 (76.5) | 28.4 (83.1) | 28.2 (82.8) | 24.2 (75.6) | 18.6 (65.5) | 13.8 (56.8) | 8.6 (47.5) | 18.1 (64.6) |
| Mean daily minimum °C (°F) | 5.6 (42.1) | 7.2 (45.0) | 10.5 (50.9) | 15.0 (59.0) | 18.5 (65.3) | 21.6 (70.9) | 24.6 (76.3) | 24.1 (75.4) | 20.9 (69.6) | 16.4 (61.5) | 11.9 (53.4) | 7.1 (44.8) | 15.3 (59.5) |
| Record low °C (°F) | −0.8 (30.6) | 0.5 (32.9) | 3.3 (37.9) | 5.6 (42.1) | 11.9 (53.4) | 15.3 (59.5) | 19.9 (67.8) | 18.2 (64.8) | 14.4 (57.9) | 9.4 (48.9) | 3.9 (39.0) | −0.5 (31.1) | −0.8 (30.6) |
| Average precipitation mm (inches) | 18.6 (0.73) | 21.1 (0.83) | 55.4 (2.18) | 114.3 (4.50) | 172.5 (6.79) | 182.6 (7.19) | 148.4 (5.84) | 133.1 (5.24) | 132.6 (5.22) | 110.3 (4.34) | 62.9 (2.48) | 23.9 (0.94) | 1,175.7 (46.28) |
| Average precipitation days (≥ 0.1 mm) | 9.7 | 8.9 | 12.2 | 14.9 | 16.3 | 15.5 | 11.2 | 11.3 | 12.1 | 16.0 | 12.6 | 11.3 | 152 |
| Average snowy days | 0.4 | 0 | 0 | 0 | 0 | 0 | 0 | 0 | 0 | 0 | 0 | 0.1 | 0.5 |
| Average relative humidity (%) | 84 | 80 | 77 | 79 | 81 | 83 | 77 | 73 | 78 | 86 | 87 | 87 | 81 |
| Mean monthly sunshine hours | 26.7 | 41.1 | 84.9 | 114.7 | 116.7 | 117.3 | 198.8 | 207.5 | 125.0 | 70.5 | 47.9 | 25.0 | 1,176.1 |
| Percentage possible sunshine | 8 | 13 | 23 | 29 | 28 | 28 | 47 | 51 | 34 | 20 | 15 | 8 | 25 |
Source: China Meteorological Administrationall-time July high
