= Shilongba =

Shilongba 石龙坝镇
- Town
- Location in Yunnan.
- Coordinates: 26°35′02″N 101°21′39″E
- Country: People's Republic of China
- Province: Yunnan
- Prefecture-level city: Lijiang
- County: Huaping County
- Designated (town): 2012

Area
  - Total: 315.4 km^{2} (121.8 sq mi)
- Elevation: 1,245 m (4,085 ft)

Population (2017)
  - Total: 18,000
  - Density: 57/km^{2} (150/sq mi)
- Time zone: UTC+08:00 (China Standard)
- Postal code: 674802
- Area code: 0888

Shilongba (simplified Chinese: 石龙坝镇; traditional Chinese: 石龍壩鎮; pinyin: Shílóngbà Zhèn; lit. 'Town of Stone Dragon Dam') is a town in Huaping County, Yunnan, China. As of the 2017 statistics it had a population of 18,000 and an area of 315.4 square kilometres (121.8 sq mi).

== Etymology ==
Legend said that there is a Chinese dragon here, which often drowned farmland and endangered the people. The Jade Emperor sent Leigong to kill the dragon, as time goes by, its bones became the river bottom and dam, hence the name of "Shilongba".

== Administrative division ==
As of 2016, the town is divided into six villages:

- Minzhu (民主村)
- Jizuo (基佐村)
- Demao (德茂村)
- Longquan (龙泉村)
- Longjing (龙井村)
- Linjiang (临江村)

== History ==
In 1912 one of the first hydroelectric plants in China was built near the town by the german Siemens company.

In 1931, the Huaping government set up the Tianma Township (天马乡) in this area.

After establishment of the Communist State, in 1950, it belonged to the 3rd District. In 1958, it was renamed "Minzhu People's Commune" (民主人民公社). In 1988, Shilongba Yi and Dai Ethnic Township (石龙坝彝族傣族乡) separated from the area. On 14 August 2012, Shilongba Yi and Dai Ethnic Township was revoked and reformed as "Shilongba".

== Geography ==
The town is situated at southeastern Huaping County. The highest point in the town is Maoshuikong (冒水孔) which stands 2,321.7 metres (7,617 ft) above sea level. The lowest point is the river mouth in Tangba (塘坝河口), which, at 1,015 metres (3,330 ft) above sea level.

The town is in the subtropical monsoon climate zone, with an average annual temperature of 20.9 °C (69.6 °F), total annual rainfall of 300-millimetre (12 in), and a frost-free period of 300 days.

There are two reservoirs in the town.

There are a number of popular mountains located immediately adjacent to the townsite which include Xianling Mountain (显灵山; Maoshuikong (冒水孔; and Xicaodi Mountain (席草地后山.

The Xinzhuang River (新庄河), Longquan River (龙泉河), Longtang River (龙塘河) and Longjing River (龙井河) flow through the town.

== Economy ==
The town's economy is based on nearby mineral resources and agricultural resources. The main crops are rice, wheat, corn, and sweet potato. Economic crops are mainly mango, pomegranate, citrus, pepper, bamboo, peach, and pear. The region abounds with coal, iron, gold, limestone, and quartz.

== Demographics ==
Population census
Year	Pop.	±%
1990	15,022	—
2007	16,289	+8.4%
2017	18,000	+10.5%

As of 2017, the National Bureau of Statistics of China estimates the town's population now to be 18,000. There are 12 ethnic groups in the town, such as Yi, Dai, and Lisu.

== Transportation ==
The China National Highway 353 passes across the town north to south.

The G4216 Expressway is a west–east expressway in the town.
