= Geliping =

Geliping 格里坪镇
- Town
- Location in Sichuan
- Coordinates: 26°35′55″N 101°32′54″E
- Country: People's Republic of China
- Province: Sichuan
- Prefecture-level city: Panzhihua
- District: Xi District

Area
  - Total: 122.0 km^{2} (47.1 sq mi)

Population (2020)
  - Total: 30,310
  - Density: 248.4/km^{2} (643.5/sq mi)
- Time zone: UTC+8 (China Standard)

Geliping (Chinese: 格里坪; pinyin: Gélǐpíng) is a town in Xi District, Panzhihua, Sichuan province, China. As of 2020, it has two residential neighborhoods and six villages under its administration:

Neighborhoods

- Jinlin Community (金林社区)
- Jingyi Community (景怡社区)

Villages

- Geliping Village
- Xinzhuang Village (新庄村)
- Dashuijing Village (大水井村)
- Jinjia Village (金家村)
- Zhuangshang Village (庄上村)
- Jinqiao Village (金桥村)

== See also ==
- List of township-level divisions of Sichuan
