= Dong District, Panzhihua =

Dong District 东区
- District
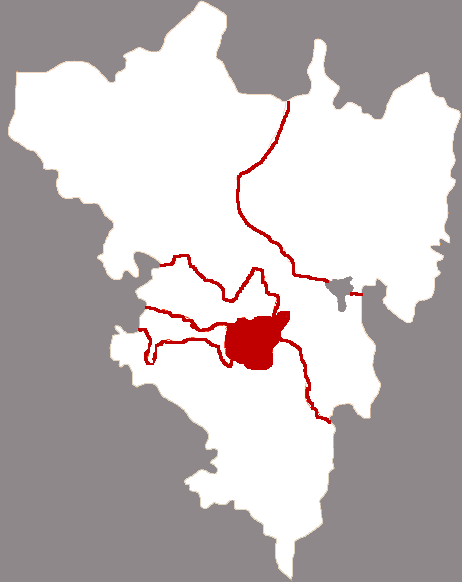
- Location of the county in Panzhihua

- Location in Sichuan
- Coordinates: 26°32′47″N 101°42′15″E
- Country: China
- Province: Sichuan
- Prefecture-level city: Panzhihua
- District seat: Dadukou Subdistrict

Area
  - Total: 167.23 km^{2} (64.57 sq mi)

Population (2020 census)
  - Total: 411,427
  - Density: 2,460.2/km^{2} (6,372.0/sq mi)
- Time zone: UTC+8 (China Standard)
- Website: www.scdongqu.gov.cn

Dong District (simplified Chinese: 东区; traditional Chinese: 東區; pinyin: Dōng Qū; lit. 'East District') is a district of Panzhihua, Sichuan province, China. As of the end of 2006, it has a population of 319,000 residing in an area of 167.23 km^{2} (64.57 sq mi).

== Administrative divisions ==
Dong District comprises 5 subdistricts and 1 town:

- Dadukou Subdistrict (大渡口街道)
- Bingcaogang Subdistrict (炳草岗街道)
- Nongnongping Subdistrict (弄弄坪街道)
- Guaziping Subdistrict (瓜子坪街道)
- Donghua Subdistrict (东华街道)
- Yinjiang Town (银江镇)
