= Xi District =

Xi District 西区
- District
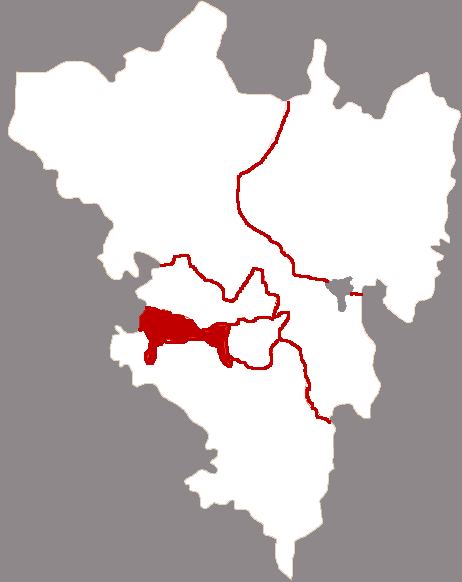
- Location of the county in Panzhihua

- Location in Sichuan
- Coordinates: 26°35′52″N 101°37′50″E
- Country: China
- Province: Sichuan
- Prefecture-level city: Panzhihua

Area
  - Total: 124 km^{2} (48 sq mi)

Population (2020 census)
  - Total: 129,406
  - Density: 1,040/km^{2} (2,700/sq mi)
- Time zone: UTC+8 (China Standard)

Xi District (simplified Chinese: 西区; traditional Chinese: 西區; pinyin: Xī Qū; lit. 'West District') is a district of Panzhihua, Sichuan province, China. As of the end of 2020, it has a population of 129,406 residing in an area of 124 km^{2} (48 sq mi).

== Administrative divisions ==
Xi District has 5 subdistricts and 1 town under its administration:

Subdistricts

- Qingxiangping Subdistrict (清香坪街道)
- Yuquan Subdistrict (玉泉街道)
- Hemenkou Subdistrict (河门口街道)
- Taojiadu Subdistrict (陶家渡街道)
- Dabaoding Subdistrict (大宝鼎街道)

Towns

- Geliping Town (格里坪镇)
