= Zhongxin, Huaping County =

Zhongxin 中心镇
- Town
- Location in Yunnan.
- Coordinates: 26°38′00″N 101°16′12″E
- Country: People's Republic of China
- Province: Yunnan
- Prefecture-level city: Lijiang
- County: Huaping County
- Designated (town): 1988

Area
  - Total: 326.4 km^{2} (126.0 sq mi)
- Elevation: 1,984.8 m (6,512 ft)

Population (2017)
  - Total: 47,403
  - Density: 145.2/km^{2} (376.1/sq mi)
- Time zone: UTC+08:00 (China Standard)
- Postal code: 674800
- Area code: 0888

Zhongxin (simplified Chinese: 中心镇; traditional Chinese: 中心鎮; pinyin: Zhōngxīn Zhèn) is a town in Huaping County, Yunnan, China. As of the 2017 statistics it had a population of 47,403 and an area of 326.4-square-kilometre (126.0 sq mi). It is the political, economic and cultural center of Huaping County.

== Administrative division ==
As of 2016, the town is divided into nine villages and five communities:

- Xinglong Community (兴隆社区)
- Zhuping Community (竹屏社区)
- Liuxi Community (柳溪社区)
- Huaxing Community (华兴社区)
- Xingmin Community (兴民社区)
- Hedong (河东村)
- Hexi (河西村)
- Nanmu (楠木村)
- Suoluo (梭罗村)
- Labi (拉毕村)
- Longdong (龙洞村)
- Tianping (田坪村)
- Zuocha (左岔村)
- Maluliangzi (马路粱子村)

== History ==
In the Song dynasty (960–1279), the Tusi government set up a government office in the region. In 1382, in the 15th year of Hongwu period of the Ming dynasty (1368–1644), a Liuguan Office (流官办事驻所) was established. In 1802, in the ruling of Jiaqing Emperor of the Qing dynasty (1644–1911), the army was stationed in the region.

After the establishment of the Republic of China in 1912, in came under the jurisdiction of the Centre District of Huaping County. It was officially named "Huazhong" (华中镇) in 1931 and was renamed "Zhuping" (竹屏镇) in 1937.

In September 1950, it belonged to the 1st District. Its name was changed to "Zhongxin" (中心镇) in 1953. During the Cultural Revolution, it was called "Xianfeng People's Commune" (先锋人民公社) and then "Zhongxin People's Commune" (中心人民公社). In February 1983, it was renamed "Zhongxin District" (中心区). It reverted to its former name of Zhongxin in March 1988, and the name has been used till the present day. In August 2005, the Longdong Lisu Ethnic Township (龙洞傈僳族乡) was merged into the town.

== Geography ==
The town is situated in the central Huaping County. The highest point in the town is Mogu Mountain (蘑菇山; 'Mushroom Mountain') which stands 2,843.6 metres (9,329 ft) above sea level. The lowest point is Rongjiang (荣将), which, at 1,126 metres (3,694 ft) above sea level.

There are a number of popular mountains located immediately adjacent to the townsite which include Jiaoding Mountain (轿顶山; Baozi Rock (豹子岩), Tanshanping Mountain (炭山坪), and Longjin Mountain (龙筋山).

The Liyu River (鲤鱼河), Yubi River (鱼必河) and Zuocha River (左岔河) flow through the town.

== Climate ==
The town is in the subtropical monsoon climate zone, with an average annual temperature of 19.6 °C (67.3 °F), total annual rainfall of 1,087.8-millimetre (42.83 in), a frost-free period of 303 days and annual average sunshine hours in 2486.9 hours. Spring, fall and winter are warm, while winter is relatively dry. The highest temperature is 41.8 °C (107.2 °F) (1 June 1983), and the lowest temperature is −2.1 °C (28.2 °F) (31 December 1973).

== Economy ==
The economy of the town has a predominantly agricultural orientation, including farming and pig-breeding. Significant crops include rice, wheat and corn. The region also has an abundance of coastal, iron, copper, limestone, granite, graphite, kaolinite, and bauxite.

== Demographics ==
Population census
Year	Pop.	±%
1988	21,956	—
1990	25,815	+17.6%
2000	34,375	+33.2%
2007	40,403	+17.5%
2010	51,866	+28.4%
2014	44,421	−14.4%
2017	47,403	+6.7%

In 2017, the local population was 47,403. The main ethnic groups in the town are Yi, Bai, Zhuang, Dai, Miao, Lisu, Hui and Nakhi.

== Tourist attractions ==
The Immortal Cave (仙人洞) is a famous scenic spot in the town, which is also known as a summer resort.

== Transportation ==
The town is the terminal of China National Highway 305.

The G4216 Expressway is a west–east highway in the town.
