= Yanbian County =

Yanbian County 盐边县
- County
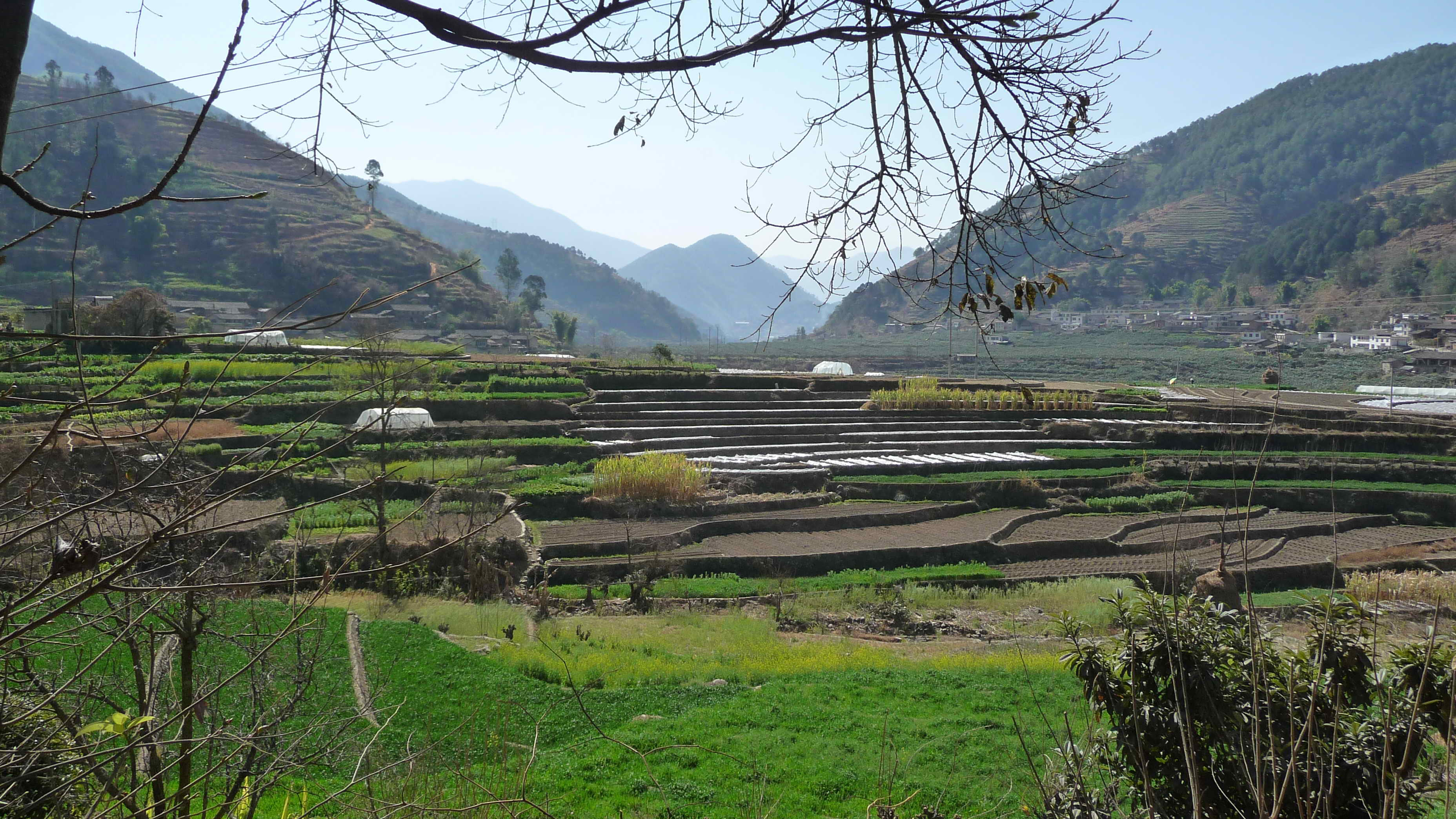

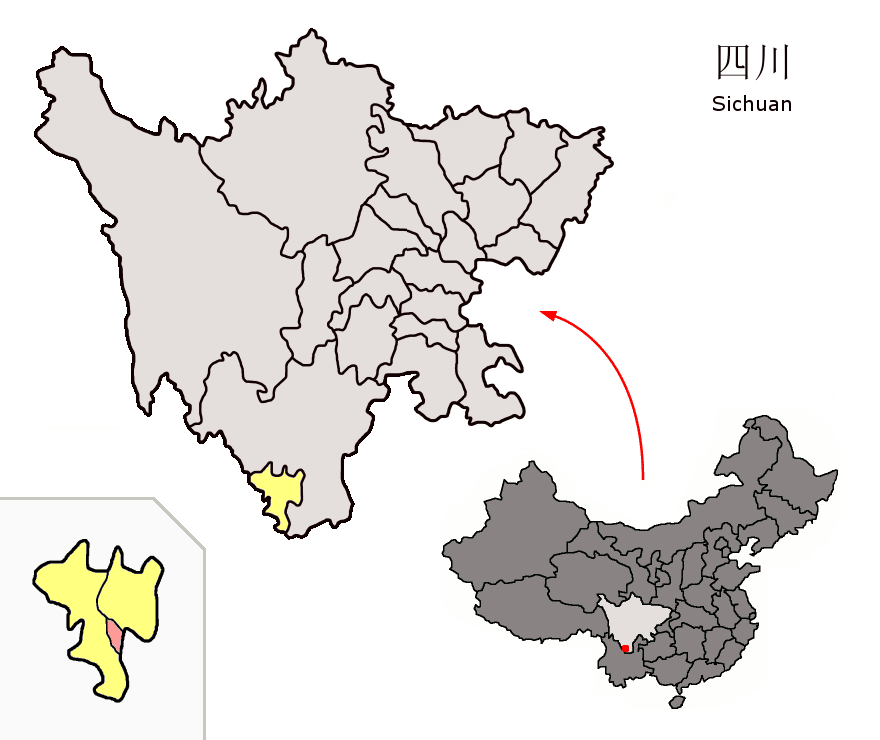
- Location of Yanbian County (red) within Panzhihua City (yellow) and Sichuan
- Coordinates: 26°41′00″N 101°51′18″E
- Country: China
- Province: Sichuan
- Prefecture-level city: Panzhihua

Area
  - Total: 3,269 km^{2} (1,262 sq mi)

Population (2020 census)
  - Total: 178,797
  - Density: 54.69/km^{2} (141.7/sq mi)
- Time zone: UTC+8 (China Standard)
- Postal code: 617100
- Area code: 0812
- Website: www.scyanbian.gov.cn

Yanbian County (simplified Chinese: 盐边县; traditional Chinese: 鹽邊縣; pinyin: Yánbiān Xiàn) is located in the northwest of Panzhihua City, Sichuan Province, China and the lower reaches of the Yalong River. It is under the jurisdiction of the prefecture-level city of Panzhihua. The name of Yanbian County is named because of its geographical location on the edge of Yanyuan County. With a total area of 3,269 square kilometers, the population in 2020 was 178,797, and the demographics were Han, Yi, Miao and other ethnic groups.

== Administrative divisions ==
Yanbian County comprises 6 towns, 2 townships and 4 ethnic townships:

towns

- Tongzilin Town 桐子林镇
- Hongge Town 红格镇
- Yumen Town 渔门镇
- Yongxing Town 永兴镇
- Xinjiu Town 新九镇
- Huimin Town 惠民镇

townships

- Gonghe Township 共和乡
- Guosheng Township 国胜乡

ethnic townships

- Hongguo Yi Ethnic Township 红果彝族乡
- Hongbao Miao and Yi Ethnic Township 红宝苗族彝族乡
- Wenquan Yi Ethnic Township 温泉彝族乡
- Gesala Yi Ethnic Township 格萨拉彝族乡

== Climate ==
Climate data for Yanbian, elevation 1,140 m (3,740 ft), (1991–2020 normals, extremes 1981–present)
Month	Jan	Feb	Mar	Apr	May	Jun	Jul	Aug	Sep	Oct	Nov	Dec	Year
Record high °C (°F)	29.8 (85.6)	32.2 (90.0)	36.2 (97.2)	38.8 (101.8)	40.2 (104.4)	39.6 (103.3)	38.2 (100.8)	36.8 (98.2)	35.8 (96.4)	33.7 (92.7)	33.1 (91.6)	27.7 (81.9)	40.2 (104.4)
Mean daily maximum °C (°F)	22.2 (72.0)	25.3 (77.5)	29.0 (84.2)	31.8 (89.2)	33.0 (91.4)	32.6 (90.7)	31.2 (88.2)	30.9 (87.6)	28.7 (83.7)	26.8 (80.2)	24.1 (75.4)	21.5 (70.7)	28.1 (82.6)
Daily mean °C (°F)	12.3 (54.1)	15.7 (60.3)	20.1 (68.2)	23.3 (73.9)	25.3 (77.5)	25.8 (78.4)	24.8 (76.6)	24.3 (75.7)	22.3 (72.1)	19.7 (67.5)	15.6 (60.1)	12.2 (54.0)	20.1 (68.2)
Mean daily minimum °C (°F)	5.5 (41.9)	8.1 (46.6)	12.2 (54.0)	15.8 (60.4)	19.0 (66.2)	20.9 (69.6)	20.8 (69.4)	20.4 (68.7)	18.8 (65.8)	15.8 (60.4)	10.6 (51.1)	6.7 (44.1)	14.6 (58.2)
Record low °C (°F)	2.3 (36.1)	2.9 (37.2)	4.8 (40.6)	9.7 (49.5)	11.1 (52.0)	15.0 (59.0)	16.7 (62.1)	15.4 (59.7)	12.5 (54.5)	10.3 (50.5)	2.9 (37.2)	0.4 (32.7)	0.4 (32.7)
Average precipitation mm (inches)	5.8 (0.23)	4.2 (0.17)	6.1 (0.24)	14.8 (0.58)	52.9 (2.08)	161.0 (6.34)	247.8 (9.76)	185.3 (7.30)	177.4 (6.98)	64.4 (2.54)	10.8 (0.43)	2.4 (0.09)	932.9 (36.74)
Average precipitation days (≥ 0.1 mm)	2.0	1.8	2.4	4.4	9.3	14.7	19.2	16.2	15.7	9.9	3.2	1.5	100.3
Average relative humidity (%)	57	45	37	39	48	64	76	77	79	76	71	67	61
Mean monthly sunshine hours	233.1	232.5	264.2	262.8	242.6	185.8	157.8	176.7	148.6	177.2	203.7	208.3	2,493.3
Percentage possible sunshine	70	73	71	68	58	45	38	44	41	50	63	64	57
Source: China Meteorological Administrationall-time November record high
