= Panzhihua =

Panzhihua 攀枝花市
- Prefecture-level city
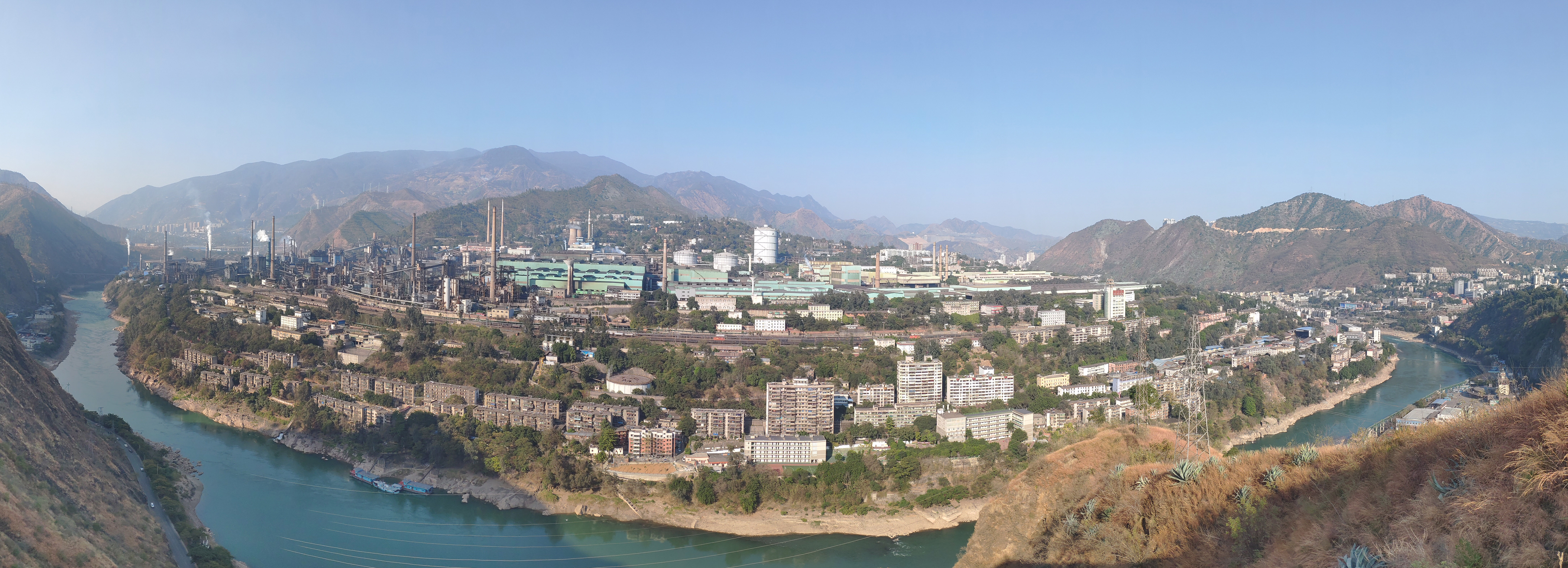
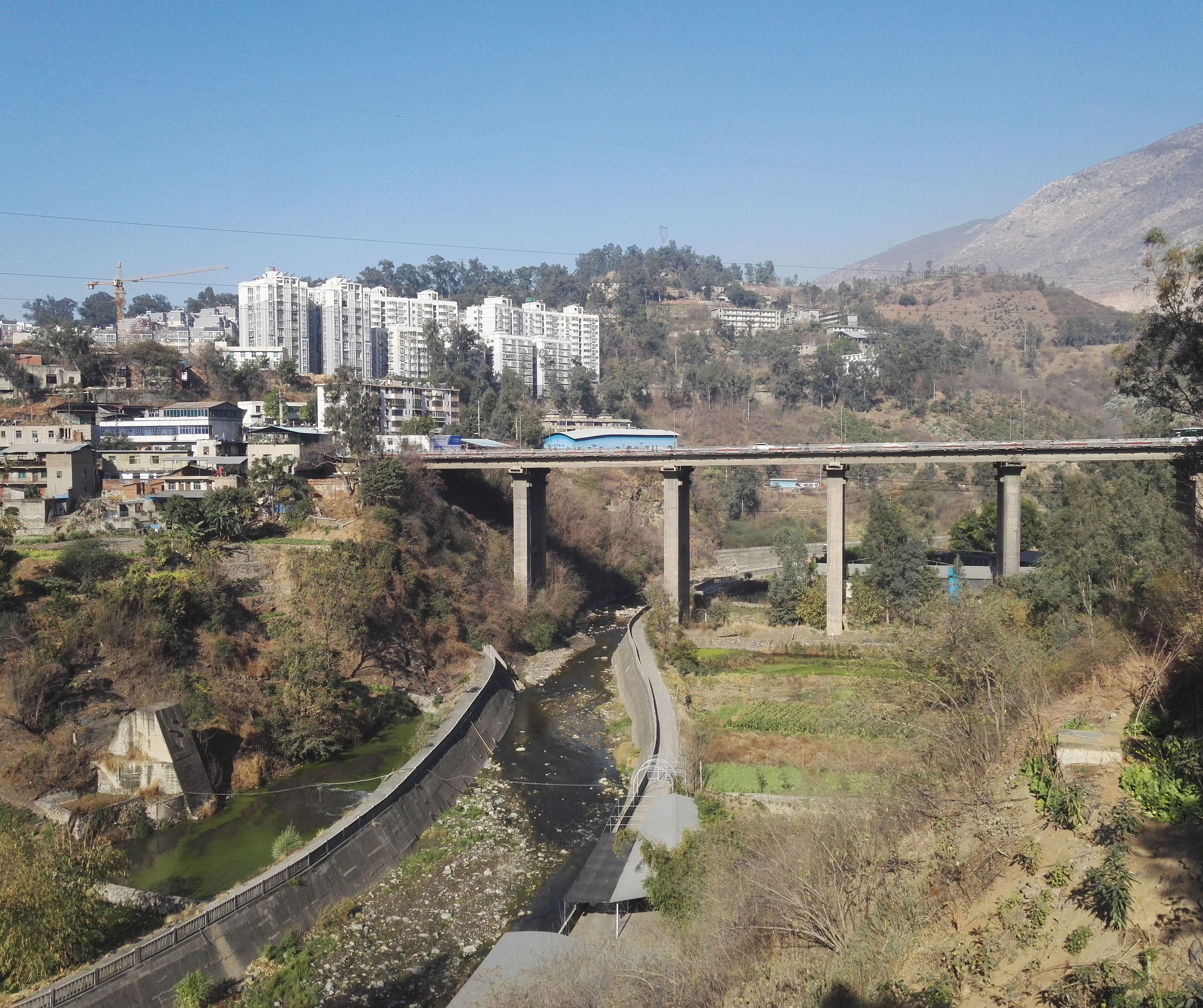
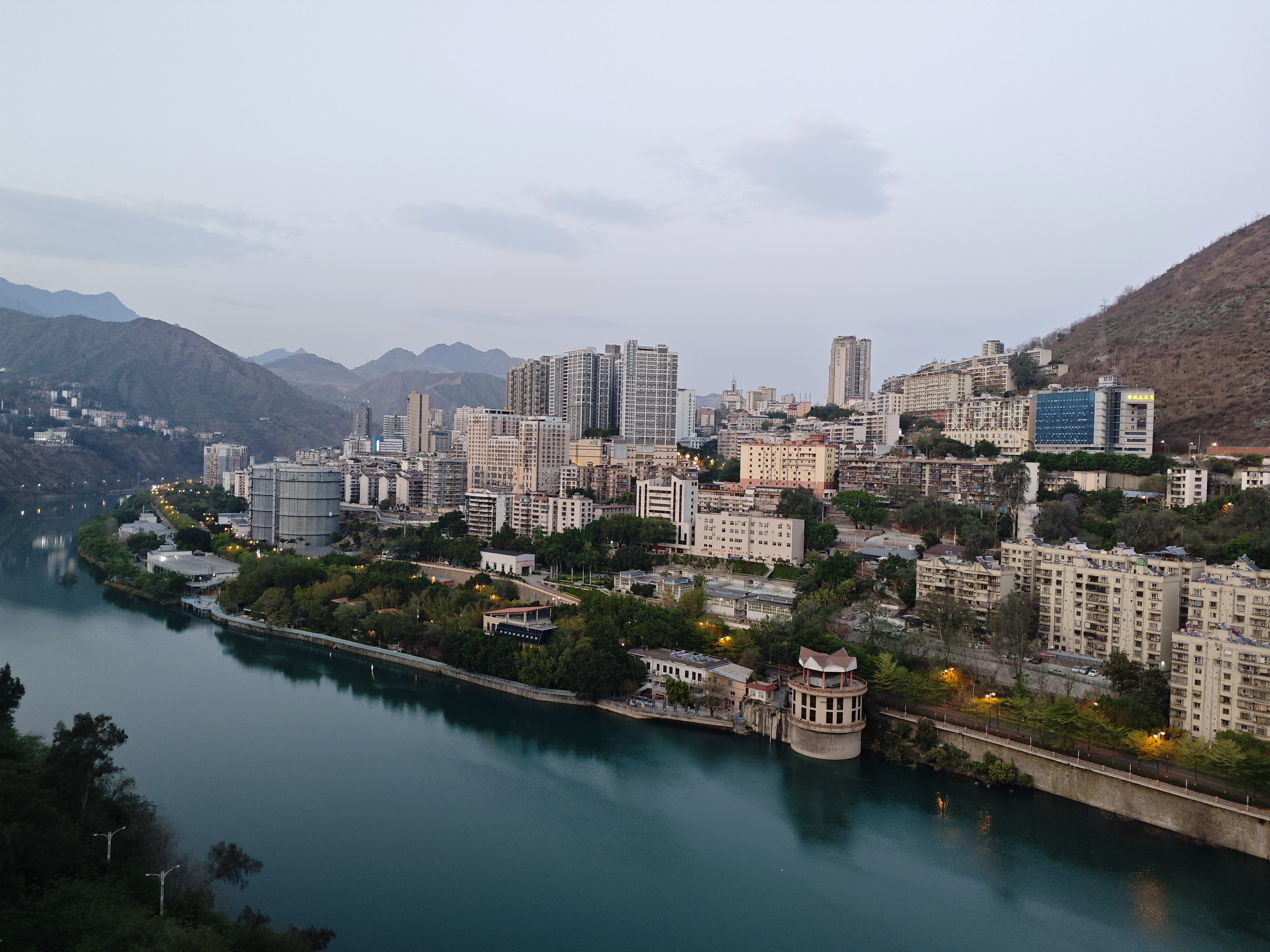
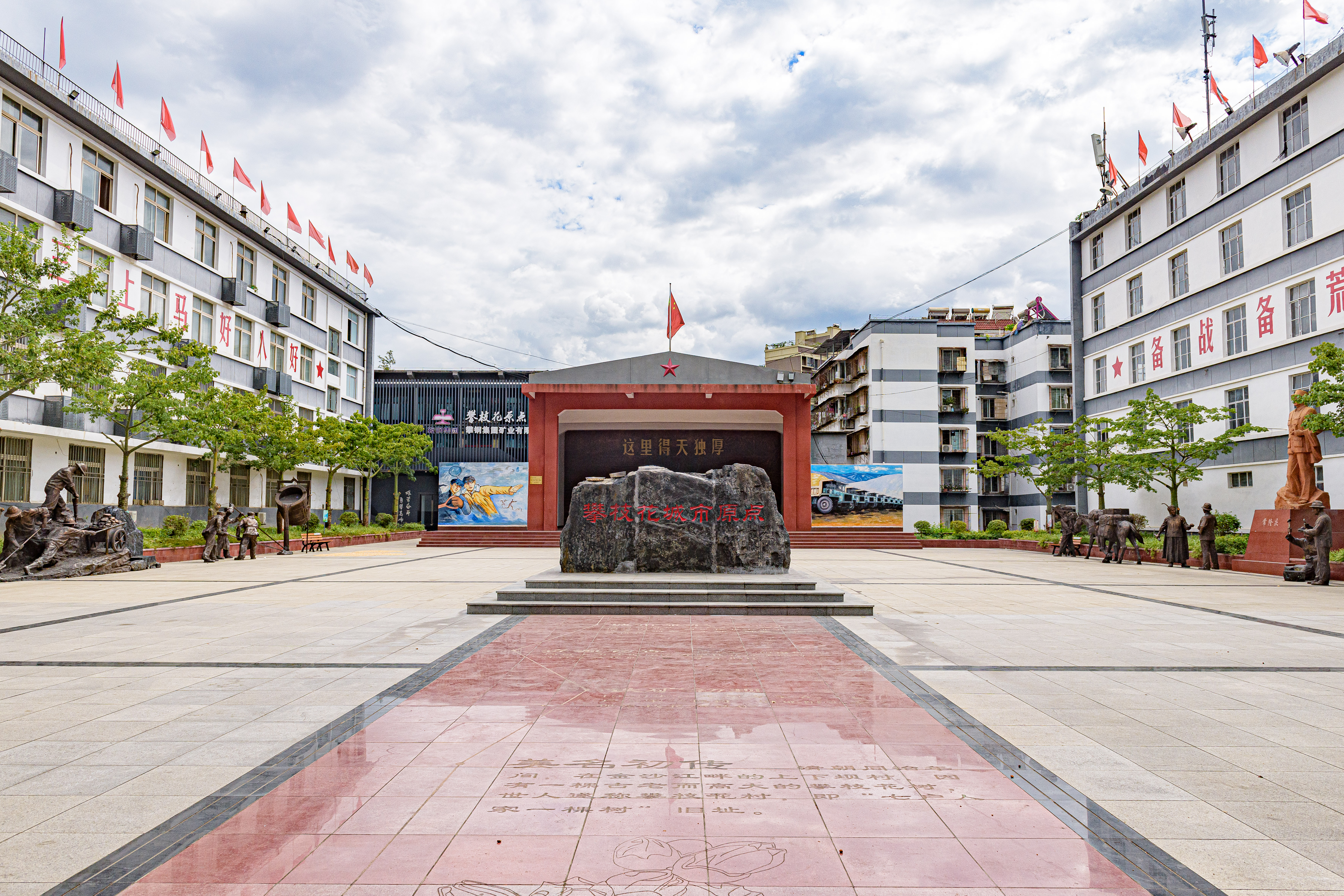
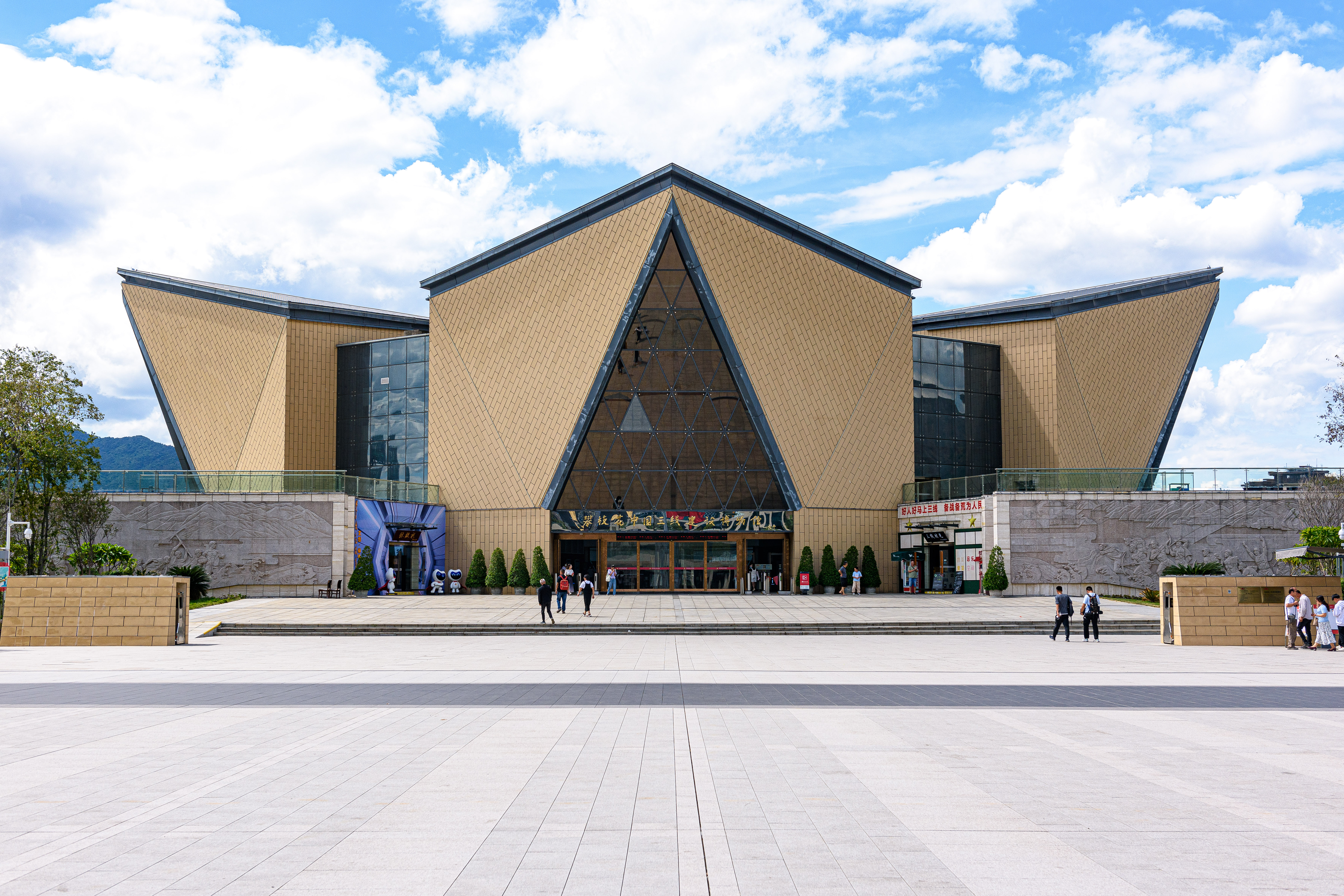
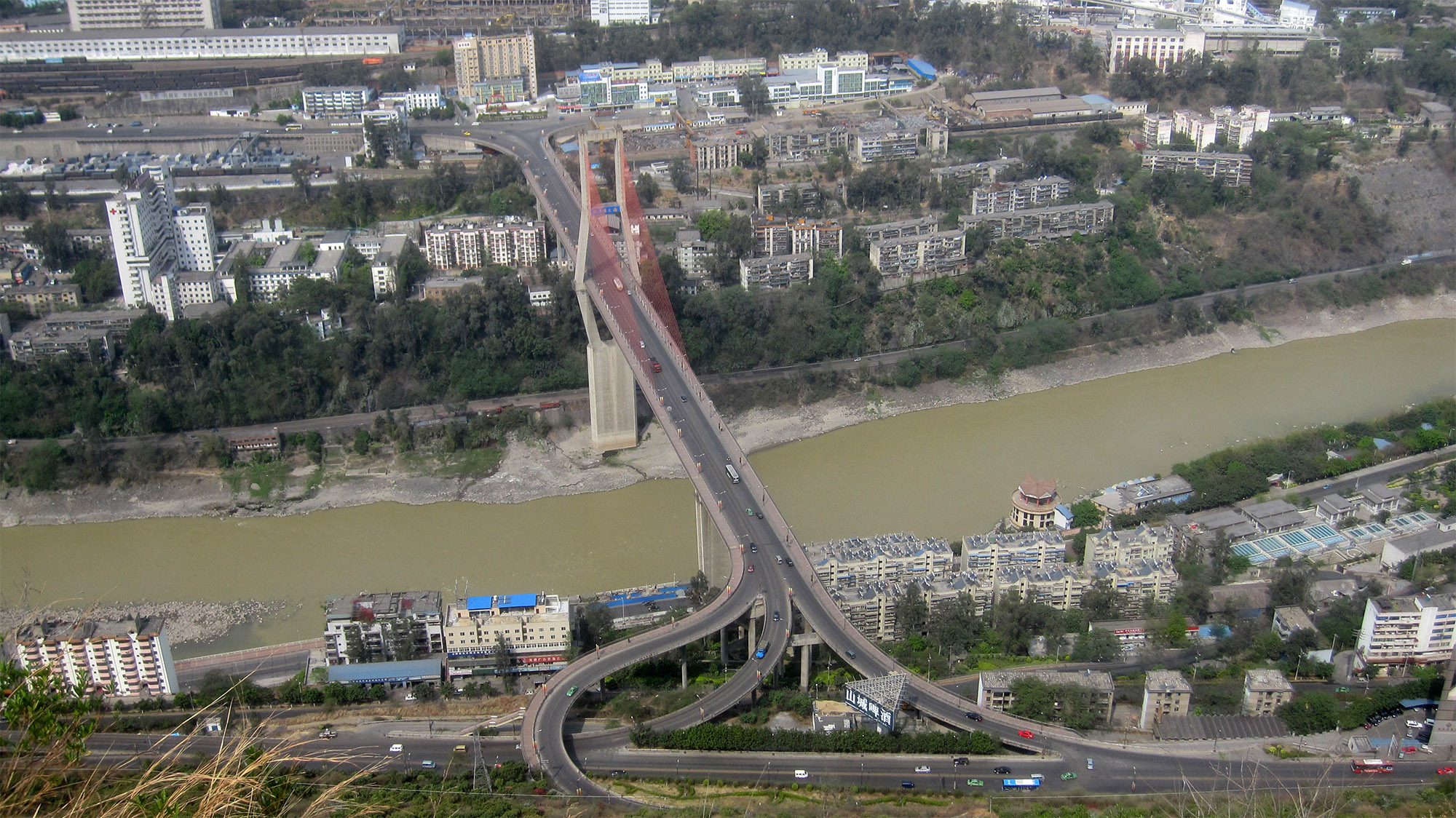
- Panzhihua Iron and Steel in Nongnongping Baguanhe in Xi District Bingcaogang in Dong District Panzhihua Origin Square The Third Line Construction Museum in Renhe District Bingcaogang Bridge over Jinsha River
- Motto: "花是一座城，城是一朵花" (The flower is a city, the city is a flower)
- Location of Panzhihua in Sichuan
- Coordinates (Panzhihua municipal government): 26°34′57″N 101°43′06″E
- Country: China
- Province: Sichuan
- Municipal seat: Dong District

Area
  - Prefecture-level city: 7,423.42 km^{2} (2,866.20 sq mi)
  - Urban: 2,010.7 km^{2} (776.3 sq mi)
  - Metro: 2,010.7 km^{2} (776.3 sq mi)
- Elevation: 1,157 m (3,796 ft)

Population (2020 census)
  - Prefecture-level city: 1,212,203
  - Density: 163.294/km^{2} (422.931/sq mi)
  - Urban: 806,395
  - Urban density: 401.05/km^{2} (1,038.7/sq mi)
  - Metro: 806,395
  - Metro density: 401.05/km^{2} (1,038.7/sq mi)

GDP
  - Prefecture-level city: CN¥ 92.5 billion US$ 14.9 billion
  - Per capita: CN¥ 75,081; US$ 12,055
- Time zone: UTC+8 (China Standard)
- Postal code: 617000
- Area code: 0812
- ISO 3166 code: CN-SC-04
- Website: www.panzhihua.gov.cn

Panzhihua (Chinese: 攀枝花; pinyin: Pānzhīhuā), formerly Dukou (渡口), is a prefecture-level city located in the far south of Sichuan province, China, at the confluence of the Jinsha and Yalong Rivers. It has an administrative area of 7,423.42 square kilometres (2,866.20 sq mi), and a population at the 2020 census of 1,212,203. 806,395 lived in the built-up (or metro) area made of 3 urban districts.

Its economy relies almost entirely on its giant mine, one of the country's largest. The economy in Panzhihua is mainly centered on natural resource development and heavy-industry. The city grew into a major city for steel production during the Third Front construction. The urban center was built on top of mountainous terrains. In 2005, Panzhihua won the "China Excellent Tourist City" title, in 2008 it won the "National Health City" and the "China Vanadium, Titanium" titles.

== History ==
The construction of Panzhihua occurred during China's Third Front construction, a Mao Zedong-era campaign to develop basic and national defense industry in China's rugged interior in the event of foreign invasion. Mao viewed the building of the city as so important that he repeatedly told other party leadership that until it was built he would "not sleep well a single day." Speaking figuratively, he routinely emphasized the importance of developing Panzhihua by stating that if party leaders would not develop the city, he would "ride a donkey and hold a meeting" to build it himself.

Southwest Third Front Commission Vice Director Cheng Zihua was among the first to investigate the Panzhihua site, traveling there in mid-1964 when only eight households lived in Panzhihua. In his memoirs, Cheng highlights Panzhihua's suitability for a strategic industrial rear because its "lofty mountains and steep hills" would make it difficult for enemy infantry to access or for enemy airplanes to bomb.

Meeting with Panzhihua leaders in October 1964, Bo Yibo emphasized that while it was critical to increase production in the area, doing so had to avoid the mistakes of the Great Leap Forward, a time when the emphasis on industrial production resulted in many people lacking "grain to eat."

In an effort to avoid what Chinese policymakers viewed as a mistake of Soviet-style industrialization, the builders of Panzhihua were tasked with constructing in an austere style consistent with the success of the Daqing oil field –service areas, multistory buildings, and cultural areas should be avoided in order to ensure maximum resources for heavy industry. Consistent with this mandate, Director of the Planning Commission Li Fuchun directed that at Panzhihua, workers should "dig a hole for a toilet" and only canvas tents should be necessary for housing. According to academic Hou Li, the resulting style of construction is best characterized as "industrialization without urbanization."

Panzhihua Steel was built during the Third Front campaign. Because planners chose locations based on military defense considerations, Panzhihua Steel was built on the side of a mountain, unlike most steel factories which are built on flat land. To ensure that the facility had the level foundation necessary for steel production, workers built the factory on massive steps carved out of the slope. Instead of the internal track system common to steel factories, technicians used a cable system to connect different parts of the facility to better adapt to the local terrain.

Consistent with the Third Front construction's emphasis on secrecy due to national security concerns, the completion of the Panzhihua facility was not promoted at the time. Today, the city government of Panzhihua promotes it as a model of Chinese technological ingenuity.

Panzhihua city government built a hospital in 1965 to provide health care for Third Front workers and their families, with Panzhihua Steel itself also establishing a hospital in 1970. In 1966, two power stations were built in Panzhihua as was a water processing plant. Due to Panzhihua's focus on industrialization, factories and mines had priority access to these utilities, with general access to filtered water and power coming over time.

During the period of the Third Front campaign, almost every work unit in Panzhihua was a state-owned enterprise. The social services provided by these units meant that Panzhihua residents generally had a much greater welfare net than rural residents generally.

In recent years, Panzhihua has experienced major population outflows. As a result, its government now offers subsidies to those who move to Panzhihua and have two or three children.

== Geography and climate ==
The area has a monsoon-influenced humid subtropical climate (Köppen Cwa), with short, mild, dry winters and long, hot, and humid summers. Highs drop to 21 °C (70 °F) in December and January, quickly rebounding during the dry springs, and peak in May and June, unlike much of the rest of the province. Much of the annual rainfall occurs from June to September. Panzhihua is one of unique places in the world without any seasonal lag. Extremes since 1961 have ranged from 0.4 °C (32.7 °F) on 25 December 1999 to 42.2 °C (108.0 °F) on 21 May 2012.

Climate data for Panzhihua, elevation 1,225 m (4,019 ft), (1991–2020 normals, extremes 1971–present)
| Month | Jan | Feb | Mar | Apr | May | Jun | Jul | Aug | Sep | Oct | Nov | Dec | Year |
|---|---|---|---|---|---|---|---|---|---|---|---|---|---|
| Record high °C (°F) | 29.2 (84.6) | 32.5 (90.5) | 35.9 (96.6) | 38.5 (101.3) | 42.2 (108.0) | 41.6 (106.9) | 38.8 (101.8) | 38.1 (100.6) | 35.1 (95.2) | 33.5 (92.3) | 32.4 (90.3) | 28.1 (82.6) | 42.2 (108.0) |
| Mean daily maximum °C (°F) | 21.8 (71.2) | 25.0 (77.0) | 28.8 (83.8) | 31.7 (89.1) | 32.9 (91.2) | 32.6 (90.7) | 31.0 (87.8) | 30.7 (87.3) | 28.7 (83.7) | 26.7 (80.1) | 23.8 (74.8) | 21.1 (70.0) | 27.9 (82.2) |
| Daily mean °C (°F) | 13.6 (56.5) | 17.1 (62.8) | 21.3 (70.3) | 24.5 (76.1) | 26.1 (79.0) | 26.4 (79.5) | 25.3 (77.5) | 24.9 (76.8) | 23.0 (73.4) | 20.5 (68.9) | 16.3 (61.3) | 13.2 (55.8) | 21.0 (69.8) |
| Mean daily minimum °C (°F) | 7.2 (45.0) | 10.2 (50.4) | 14.4 (57.9) | 17.9 (64.2) | 20.4 (68.7) | 21.7 (71.1) | 21.5 (70.7) | 21.0 (69.8) | 19.4 (66.9) | 16.4 (61.5) | 11.3 (52.3) | 7.6 (45.7) | 15.8 (60.4) |
| Record low °C (°F) | 1.7 (35.1) | 3.6 (38.5) | 4.9 (40.8) | 8.7 (47.7) | 10.5 (50.9) | 13.6 (56.5) | 15.2 (59.4) | 15.6 (60.1) | 10.9 (51.6) | 9.5 (49.1) | 3.3 (37.9) | 0.4 (32.7) | 0.4 (32.7) |
| Average precipitation mm (inches) | 6.3 (0.25) | 3.5 (0.14) | 7.3 (0.29) | 13.4 (0.53) | 50.5 (1.99) | 146.6 (5.77) | 216.0 (8.50) | 176.1 (6.93) | 137.6 (5.42) | 52.7 (2.07) | 11.7 (0.46) | 2.0 (0.08) | 823.7 (32.43) |
| Average precipitation days (≥ 0.1 mm) | 1.8 | 1.5 | 2.4 | 3.9 | 8.6 | 13.9 | 18.2 | 15.3 | 13.0 | 8.4 | 3.0 | 1.1 | 91.1 |
| Average relative humidity (%) | 51 | 39 | 33 | 36 | 46 | 60 | 72 | 72 | 74 | 71 | 67 | 62 | 57 |
| Mean monthly sunshine hours | 237.9 | 247.0 | 280.3 | 279.0 | 263.6 | 210.6 | 183.7 | 194.1 | 164.3 | 198.7 | 213.3 | 217.5 | 2,690 |
| Percentage possible sunshine | 72 | 77 | 75 | 72 | 63 | 51 | 44 | 48 | 45 | 56 | 66 | 67 | 61 |
Source 1: China Meteorological Administrationall-time record highall-time November record high
Source 2: Weather China

=== Hydrology ===
Panzhihua lies in the Yangtze River basin, holding more than 95 waterways. They feed the Jinsha and Yandalong Rivers, which in turn feed the Yangtze. Annual runoff volume is 110.2 billion cubic meters. The potential hydropower capacity is 700 million kilowatts. The installed capacity is 3.474 million kilowatts.

=== Geology ===
Panzhihua is close to the Xigeda-Yuanmou fracture in the Sichuan-Yunnan border. Its Renhe District was the epicenter of the 2008 Panzhihua earthquake.

== Archaeology ==
Bronze Age cultural remains are representative of various types of bronze artifacts. Under the jurisdiction of Panzhihua City in Yanbian, Miyi and Renhe District, archeologists have collected nearly 20 bronze artifacts. Most of the dig sites were tomb sites excavated specifically for funerary objects. Practical objects were found that can be divided into three categories. Weapons such as bronze swords, bronze spears, and bronze Ge, tools such as copper axes, copper knives and copper hoes, and decorative objects like copper bracelets were found.

The objects were similar to those of western Yunnan province, reflecting ethnic group similarities. The relics date from the Warring States ~ Western Han period.

== Tourism resources ==
The landscape is dominated by natural areas. Attractions include a red cell spa, the Cave Stone Forest, the Jinsha River and Hai lake. In recent years, the Panzhihua government has been working on the development of the Sunshine Recreation Project to attract more tourists to Panzhihua for their winter vacations.

=== Cycas forest ===
Cycas first appeared some 280 million years ago in the Permian period. They consist of some 110 species. In 1971, Sichuan Agricultural Science and the original forest vegetation Panzhihua aerial survey, found more than 100,000 specimens. It is the highest altitude Cycas forest, hosting the largest number and size of specimens. This forest consists of an endemic species, Cycas panzhihuaensis.

== Ertan hydropower station ==
The Ertan Dam (simplified Chinese: 二滩大坝; traditional Chinese: 二灘大壩; pinyin: Èrtān Dàbà) is an arch dam on the Yalong River, a tributary of the Yangtze River in Sichuan.

The dam has six hydroelectric generators, each with a generating capacity of 550 MW. The total generating capacity of the facility is 3,300 MW, one of the largest in China. Annual production averages 17 TWh, and through December 5, 2006, it produced over 100 TWh of electricity. Construction of the dam started in September 1991 and was completed on December 26, 1999. A total of 12,638,000 m^{3} (446,306,758 ft^{3}) of material was excavated during construction.

== Administrative divisions ==
Map
| Name | Hanzi | Hanyu Pinyin | Population (2020) | Area (km^{2}) | Density (/km^{2}) |
|---|---|---|---|---|---|
| Dong District | 东区 | Dōngqū | 411,427 | 167 | 1,916 |
| Xi District | 西区 | Xīqū | 129,406 | 139 | 932 |
| Renhe District | 仁和区 | Rénhé Qū | 265,562 | 1,603 | 166 |
| Miyi County | 米易县 | Mǐyì Xiàn | 227,011 | 2,016 | 113 |
| Yanbian County | 盐边县 | Yánbiān Xiàn | 178,797 | 3,269 | 55 |

== Economy ==
Panzhihua is a highly industrialized area dominated by gigantic mining operations. Most of the land not in use for mining is taken up by subsistence farming.

=== Mineral resources ===
Panzhihua has abundant natural resources, but remained undeveloped until 1960. It was founded on a remote headwater of the Yangtze River in 1966 as a steel production center. It grew rapidly as it remained relatively prosperous while the rest of the country suffered under the Cultural Revolution. The city is home to the Panzhihua Iron and Steel (Group) Co, called "Pangang 攀钢", the leading steel company in southwest China.

Proven iron ore (mainly vanadium-titanium magnetite) reserves are 73.8 million tons, 72.3% of the provincial total. At the end of 2007, the city's reserves of vanadium-titanium magnetite were 6.694 billion tons, of which: titanium reserves were 425 million tons, 93% of the national total, the world's largest; vanadium reserves were 10.38 million tons, 63% in the nation, third in the world. Cobalt reserves were 746 million tons. Other minerals were chromium, gallium, scandium, nickel, copper, lead, zinc, manganese, platinum and other rare metals.

Other minerals
| Mineral | Reserves (million tons) |
|---|---|
| Cobalt | 746 |
| Coal | 708 |
| Crystalline graphite | 15.4 |
| Ju Yan | 20.98 |
| Limestone | 295 |
| Metallurgical dolomite | 363 |
| Cement sand retention | 11.94 |
| Refactory clay | 10.32 |
| Diatomite | 16.5 |
| Granite | 87.5 m^{3} |
| Marble | 53.99 m^{3} |

== Transport ==
Panzhihua is served by the Chengdu–Kunming Railway and the Panzhihua Bao'anying Airport. The city has over 10 bridges over the Jinsha River.

== Education ==
- Panzhihua University
- The city's top high schools are the No.3 Panzhihua high school (located downtown) and the no.7 high school (located in the western district (Qingxiangping))
