= Sichuan =

Province in Southwestern China

Sichuan 四川
- Province
- Province of Sichuan

Name transcription(s)
  - Chinese: 四川省 (Sìchuān shěng)
  - Abbreviation: SC / 川 (Chuān)
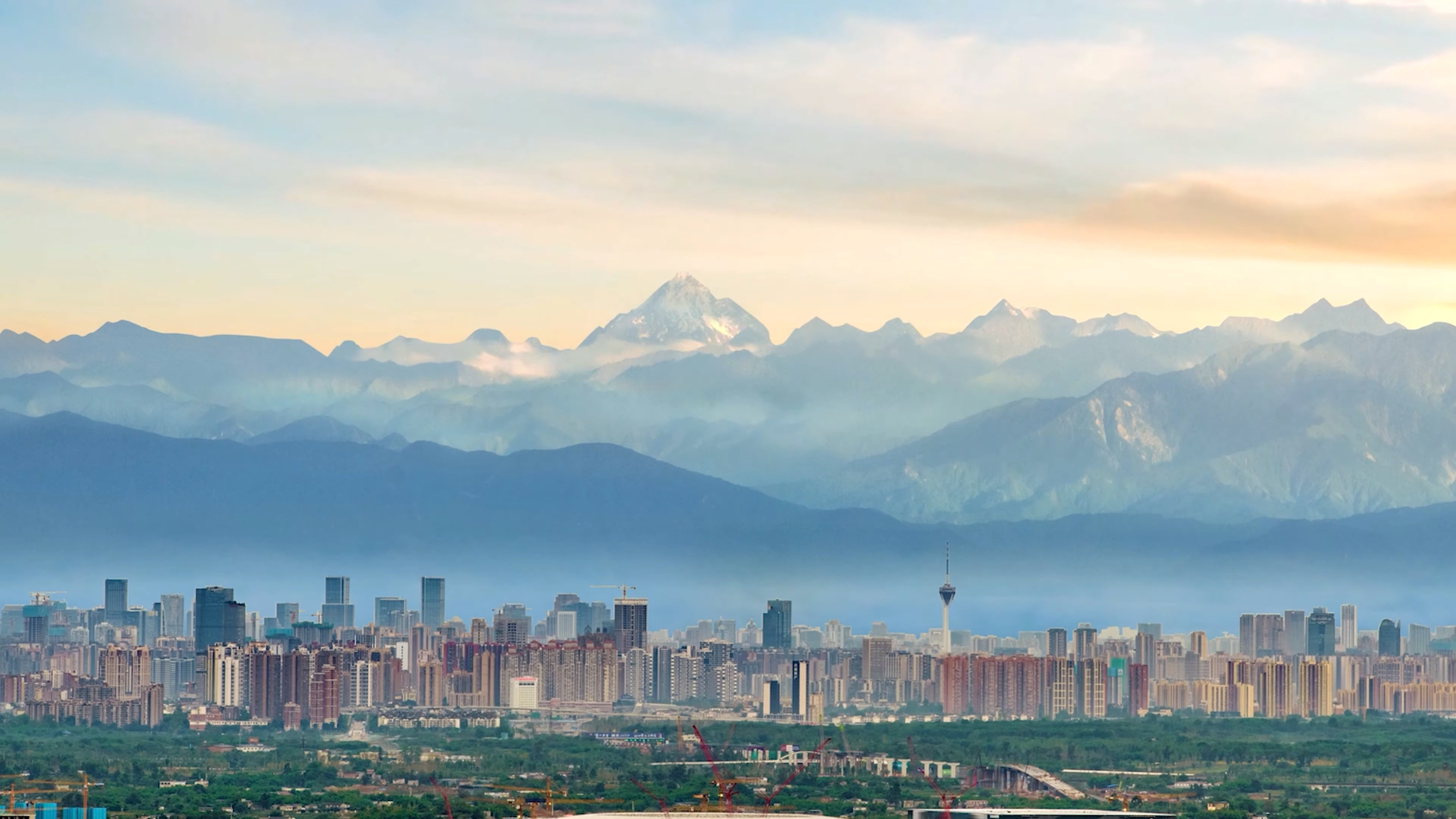
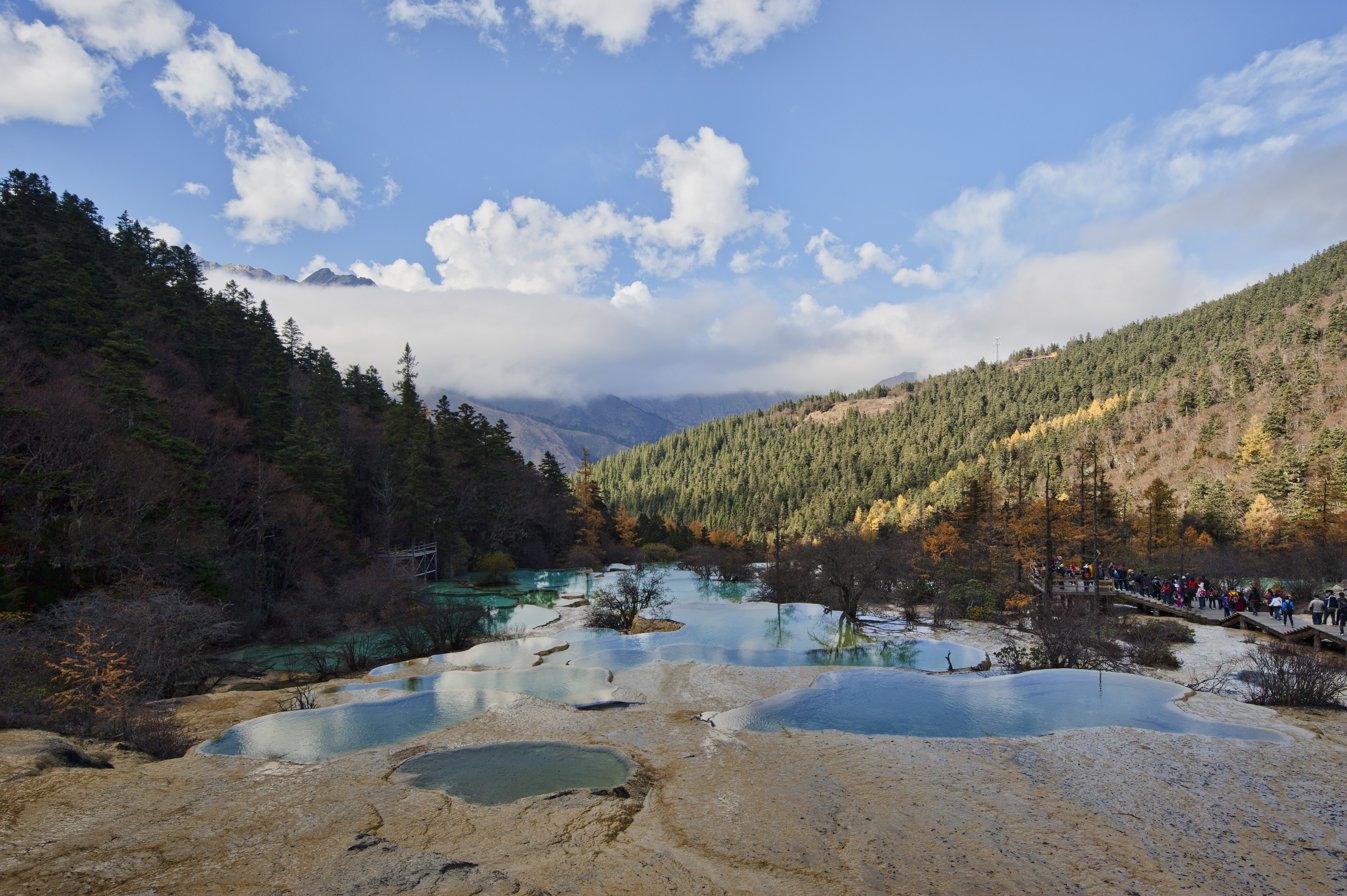
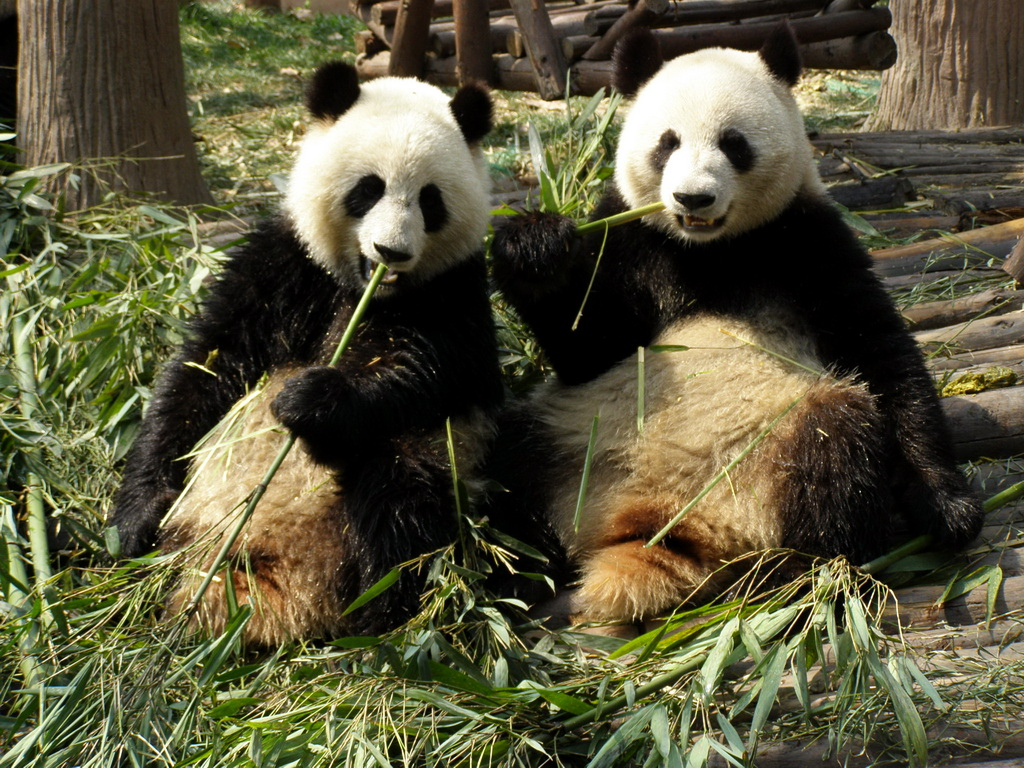
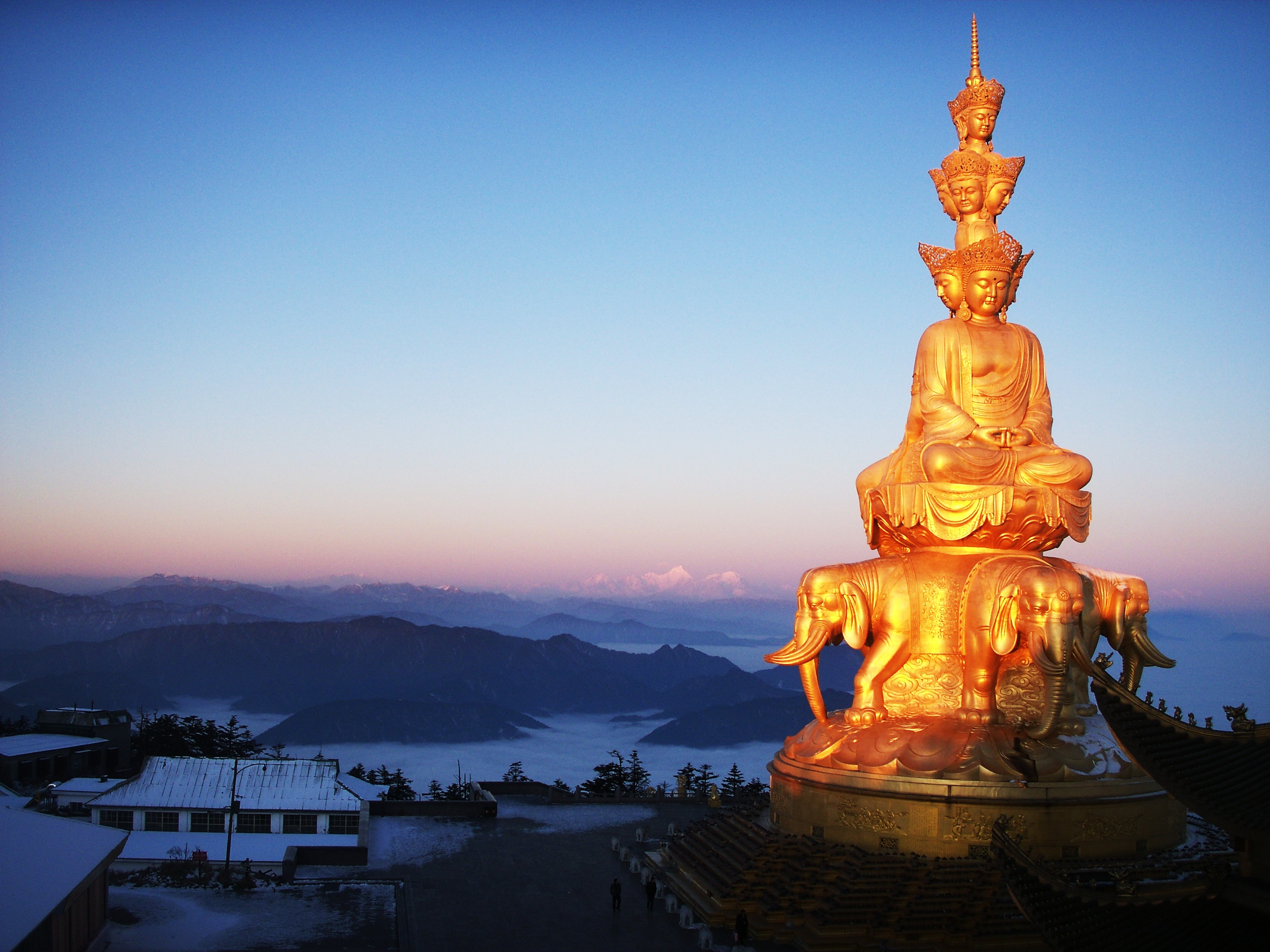
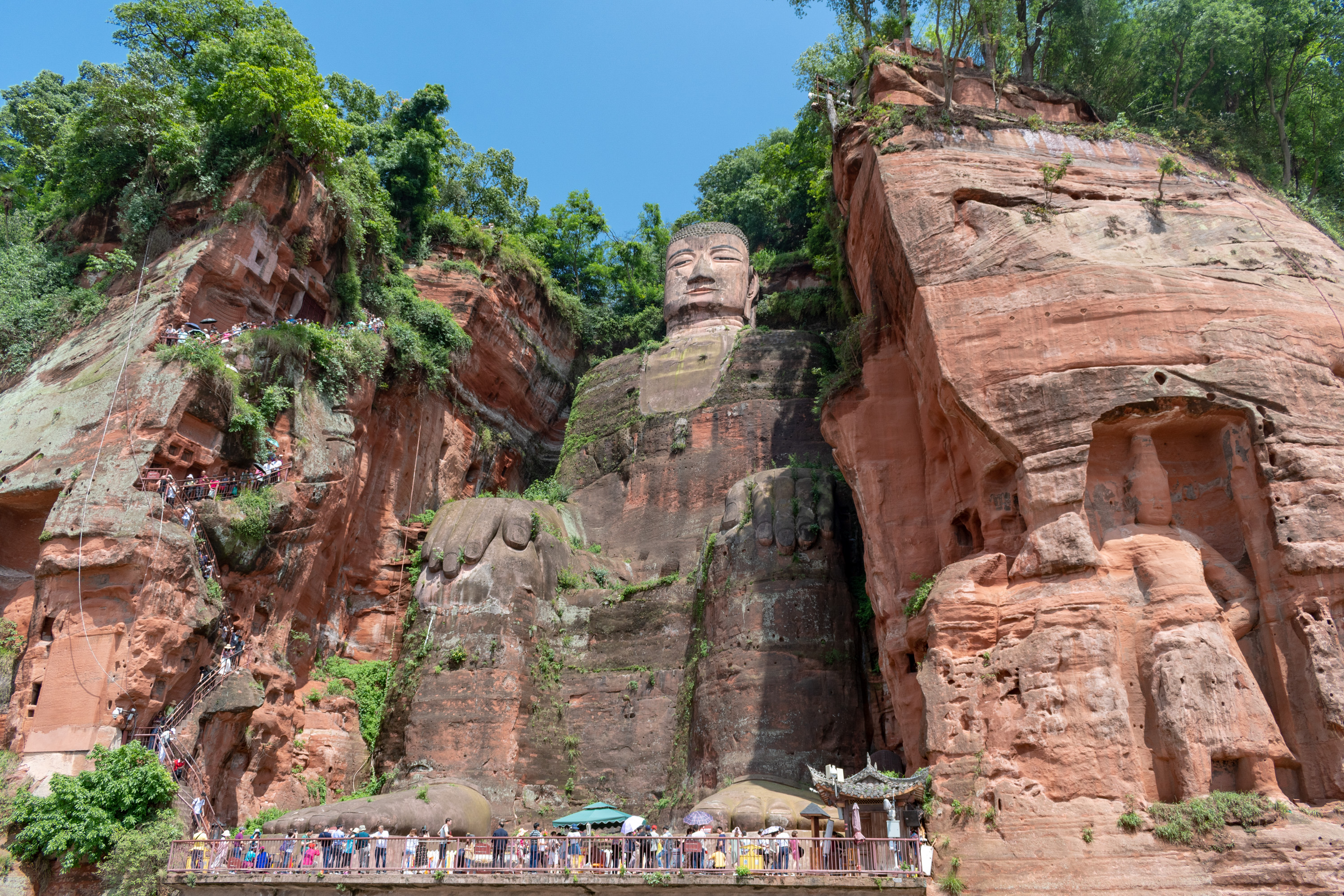
- Skyline of Chengdu Huanglong Giant pandas Mount Emei Leshan Giant Buddha

- Location of Sichuan in China
- Country: China
- Capital (and largest city): Chengdu
- Divisions: 21 prefectures, 181 counties, 5011 townships

Government
  - Type: Province
  - Body: Sichuan Provincial People's Congress
  - Party Secretary: Wang Xiaohui
  - Congress chairman: Wang Xiaohui
  - Governor: Shi Xiaolin
  - Provincial CPPCC Chairwoman: Tian Xiangli
  - National People's Congress Representation: 147 deputies

Area
  - Total: 485,000 km^{2} (187,000 sq mi)
  - Rank: 5th
- Highest elevation (Mount Gongga): 7,556 m (24,790 ft)

Population (2020)
  - Total: 83,674,866
  - Rank: 5th
  - Density: 173/km^{2} (447/sq mi)
  - Rank: 22nd

Demographics
  - Ethnic composition: Han – 95%; Yi – 2.6%; Tibetan – 1.5%; Qiang – 0.4%; Others – 0.5%
  - Languages and dialects: Southwestern Mandarin (Sichuanese); Khams Tibetan; Hakka Chinese

GDP (2024)
  - Total: CN¥6,469 billion (5th; US$908 billion)
  - Per capita: CN¥77,333 (20th; US$10,859)
- ISO 3166 code: CN-SC
- HDI (2023): 0.771 (22nd) – high
- Website: www.sc.gov.cn

Sichuan
- "Sichuan" in Chinese characters

Chinese name
- Chinese: 四川
- Postal: Szechwan
- Literal meaning: "Four Plains"
Transcriptions
Standard Mandarin
- Hanyu Pinyin: Sìchuān
- Bopomofo: ㄙˋ ㄔㄨㄢ
- Wade–Giles: Szŭ^{4}-chʻuan^{1}
- Yale Romanization: Sz̀-chwān
- IPA: [sɹ̩̂.ʈʂʰwán]
other Mandarin
- Sichuanese Pinyin: Si^{4}-cuan^{1}
Wu
- Romanization: Sy^{3}-tshoe^{1}
Hakka
- Romanization: Si-tshôn
Yue: Cantonese
- Yale Romanization: Sei-chyūn
- Jyutping: Sei3-cyun<1
- IPA: [sej˧.tsʰyn˥]
Southern Min
- Hokkien POJ: Sù-chhoan
- Tâi-lô: Sì-tshuan

Tibetan name
- Tibetan: སི་ཁྲོན་
Transcriptions
- Wylie: si khron
- Tibetan Pinyin: Sichoin

Yi name
- Yi: ꌧꍧ; syp chuo

Sichuan (Note: /sɪtʃˈwɑːn/ Chinese: 四川, Mandarin: [sɹ̩̂.ʈʂʰwán]; Sìchuān; Sichuanese romanization: Sïchuan; previously romanized as Szechwan or Szechuan.) is an inland province in Southwestern China. It is located in the Sichuan Basin and Tibetan Plateau—between the Jinsha River to the west, the Daba Mountains to the north, and the Yunnan–Guizhou Plateau to the south. Its capital city is Chengdu, and the province's population stands at 83 million. Sichuan neighbors Qinghai and Gansu to the north, Shaanxi and Chongqing to the east, Guizhou and Yunnan to the south, and Tibet to the west.

During antiquity, Sichuan was home to the kingdoms of Ba and Shu until their incorporation by the Qin around 316 BC. During the Three Kingdoms era (220–280), Liu Bei's state of Shu was based in Sichuan. The area was devastated in the 17th century by Zhang Xianzhong's rebellion and the area's subsequent Manchu conquest. The area recovered to become one of China's most productive by the 19th century. During World War II, Chongqing served as the temporary capital of the Republic of China, and was heavily bombed. It was one of the last mainland areas captured by the People's Liberation Army during the Chinese Civil War, and was divided into four parts from 1949 to 1952, with Chongqing restored two years later. It suffered gravely during the Great Chinese Famine (1959–1961) but remained China's most-populous province until Chongqing was again separated from it in 1997.

The Sichuanese people speak distinctive dialects of Mandarin Chinese. The Sichuan pepper, with its distinctive flavor and numbing effect, is prominent in modern Sichuan cuisine, featuring dishes, including Kung Pao chicken and mapo tofu, that have become staples of Chinese cuisine around the world. There are many panda stations in the province and large reserves for these creatures, such as the Chengdu Research Base of Giant Panda Breeding.

Sichuan is the 5th-largest provincial economy of China, the largest in Western China, and the largest among inland provinces. As of 2021, its nominal GDP was CN¥5,385 billion (US$847.68 billion), ahead of that of Turkey ($815 billion). If it were its own country, Sichuan would be the 18th-largest economy and 19th-most populous as of 2021.

== Names ==
It is commonly assumed that the name Sichuan means 'four rivers'; in folk etymology, this is usually taken to mean any four of the province's major rivers: Jialing, Jinsha (or the Yangtze), Wu, Min, and Tuo. According to historical geographer Tan Qixiang, 'four rivers' is an erroneous interpretation of the name. The name of the province is a contraction of the phrases 'Four Plain Circuits' (四川路; Sìchuān lù) and 'Four Circuits of Chuanxia' (川峽四路; chuānxiásìlù), referring to the division of the existing imperial administrative circuit in the area into four during the Northern Song dynasty, which were Yizhou, Lizhou, Zizhou, and Kuizhou. The word chuan (川) here means 'plain', not its typical meaning of 'river' as popularly assumed. In addition to its postal map and Wade–Giles forms of Szechwan or Szechuan, the name has also been irregularly romanized as Szű-chuan and Szechuen.

In antiquity, the area of modern Sichuan including the now-separated Chongqing Municipality was known to the Chinese as Ba–Shu, in reference to the ancient states of Ba and the Shu that once occupied the Sichuan Basin. Shu continued to be used to refer to the region to the present day; several states formed in the area used the same name, for example, the Shu of the Three Kingdoms period (220–280), and Former Shu and Later Shu of the Ten Kingdoms period (907–979). Currently, both characters for Shu and Chuan are common abbreviations for Sichuan.

The region was formerly referred to as "West China" or "Western China" by Protestant missions.

== History ==
=== Prehistory ===
The Sichuan Basin and adjacent areas of the Yangtze watershed were a cradle of indigenous civilizations dating back to at least the 15th century BC, coinciding with the Shang in northern China. The region had its own distinct religious beliefs and worldview. The earliest excavated culture found therein is the Baodun culture (c.2700–1750 BC) excavated in the Chengdu Plain.

=== Ba and Shu Kingdoms ===
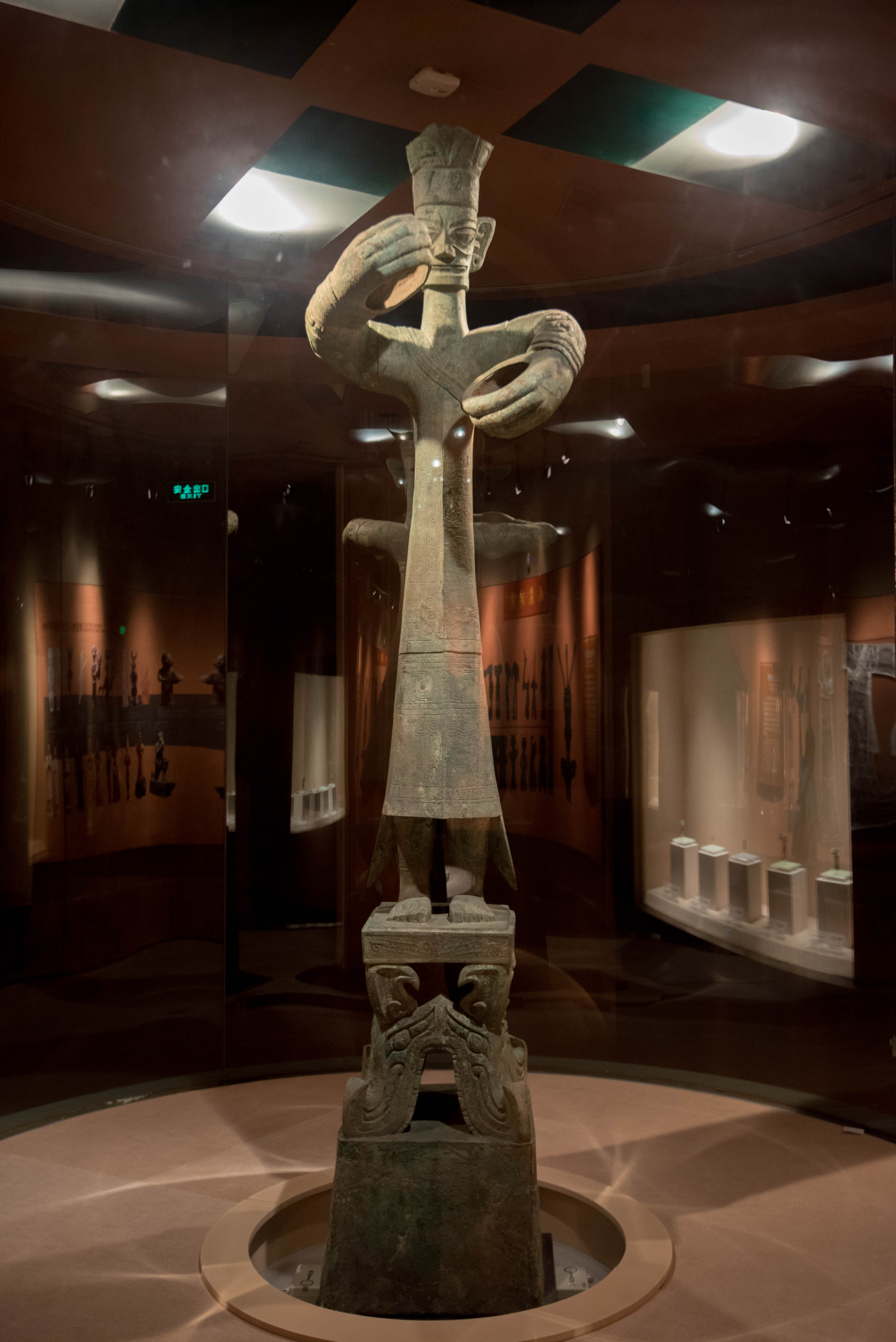
Bronze figure of a high priest from Sanxingdui, dating from the Shu kingdom

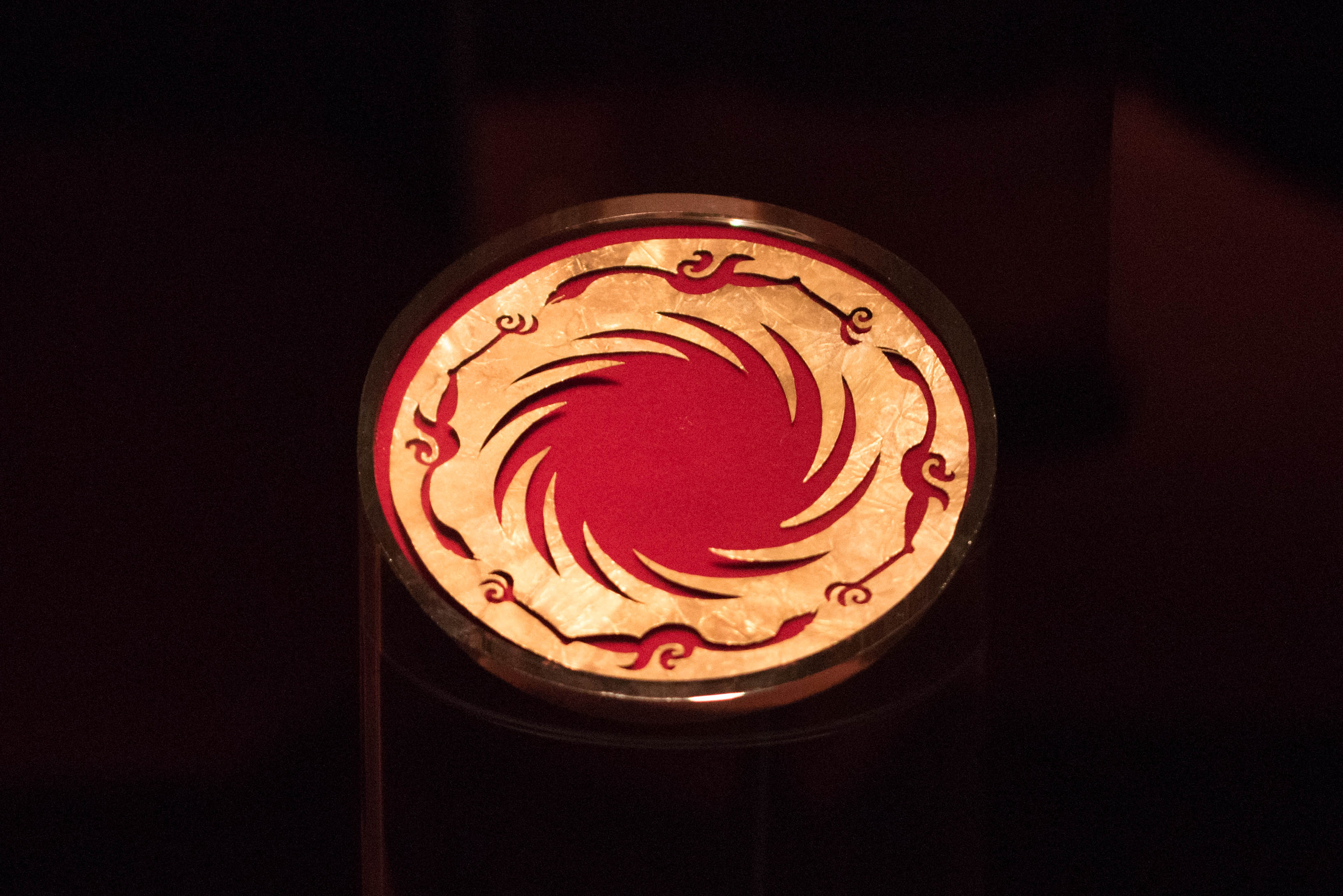
Golden Sun Bird from Jinsha site

The most important native states were those of Ba and Shu.

Ba stretched into Sichuan from the Han Valley in Shaanxi and Hubei down the Jialing River as far as its confluence with the Yangtze at Chongqing.

Shu occupied the valley of the Min, including Chengdu and other areas of western Sichuan. The existence of the early state of Shu was poorly recorded in the main historical records of China. It was, however, referred to in the Book of Documents as an ally of the Zhou. Accounts of Shu exist mainly as a mixture of mythological stories and historical legends recorded in local annals such as the Chronicles of Huayang compiled in the Jin dynasty (266–420), and the Han-dynasty compilation Chronicle of the Kings of Shu. These contained folk stories such as that of Emperor Duyu who taught the people agriculture and transformed himself into a cuckoo after his death.

The existence of a highly developed civilization with an independent bronze industry in Sichuan was excavated in 1986 at a small village named Sanxingdui in Guanghan, Sichuan. This site, believed to be an ancient city of Shu, was initially discovered by a local farmer in 1929 who found jade and stone artifacts. Excavations by archeologists yielded few significant finds until 1986 when two major sacrificial pits were found with spectacular bronze items as well as artifacts in jade, gold, earthenware, and stone. This and other discoveries in Sichuan contest the conventional historiography that the local culture and technology of Sichuan were undeveloped in comparison to the technologically and culturally "advanced" Yellow River valley of north-central China.

=== Qin dynasty ===
The rulers of the expansionist state of Qin, based in present-day Gansu and Shaanxi, were the first strategists to realize that the area's military importance matched its commercial and agricultural significance. The Sichuan basin is surrounded by the Hengduan Mountains to the west, the Qin Mountains to the north, and Yungui Plateau to the south. Since the Yangtze flows through the basin and then through the perilous Three Gorges to eastern and southern China, Sichuan was a staging area for amphibious military forces and a haven for political refugees.

Qin armies finished their conquest of the kingdoms of Shu and Ba by 316 BC. Any written records and civil achievements of earlier kingdoms were destroyed. Qin administrators introduced improved agricultural technology. Li Bing, engineered the Dujiangyan irrigation system to control the Min River, a major tributary of the Yangtze. This innovative hydraulic system was composed of movable weirs which could be adjusted for high or low water flow according to the season, to either provide irrigation or prevent floods. The increased agricultural output and taxes made the area a source of provisions and men for Qin's unification of China.

=== Han dynasty ===
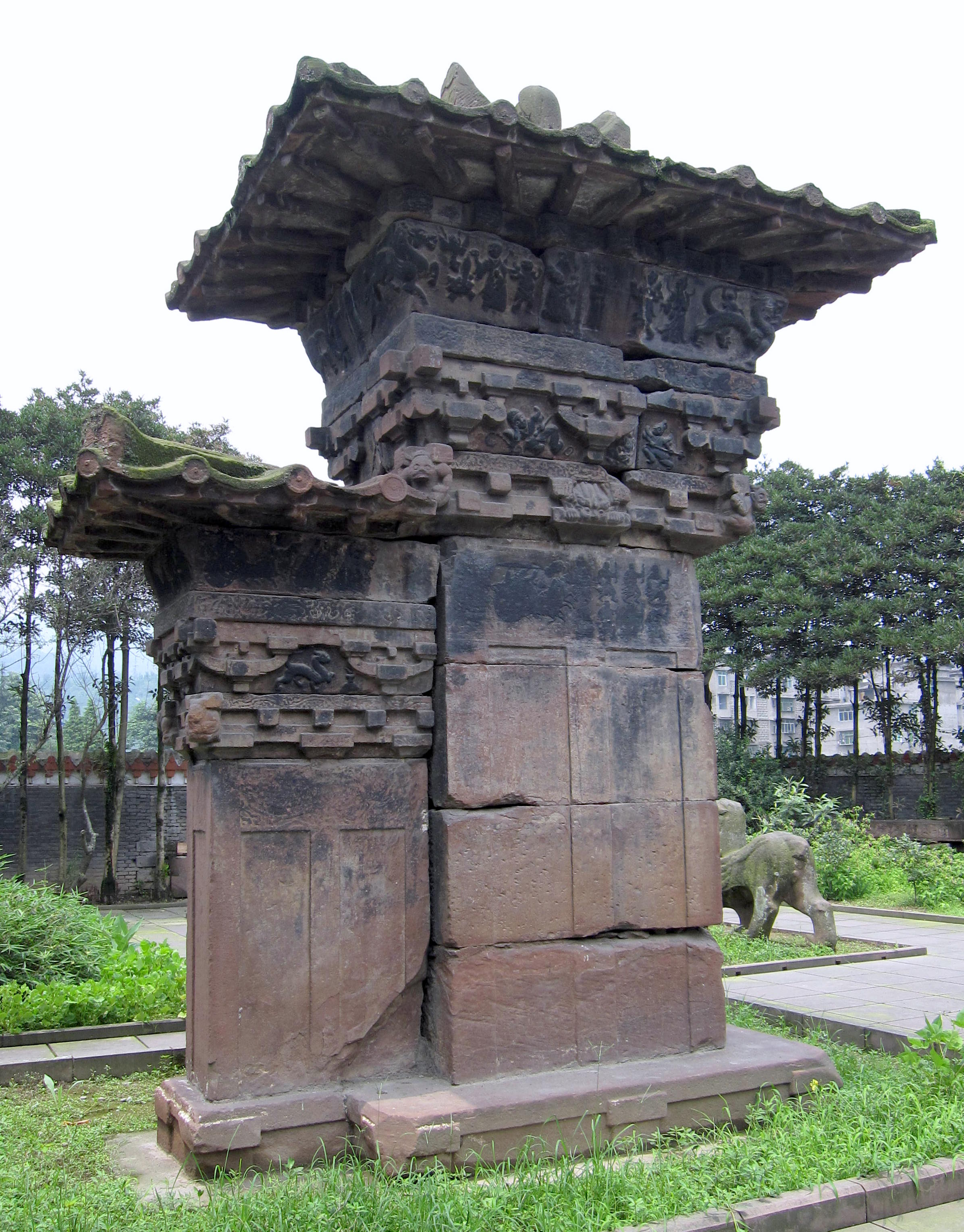
A stone-carved gate pillar, or que, 6 m (20 ft) in total height, located at the tomb of Gao Yi in Ya'an, Sichuan, built during the Eastern Han dynasty (25–220 CE)

Sichuan was subjected to the autonomous control of kings named by the imperial family of the Han dynasty. During the 11 years hiatus between 25 and 36 AD, Sichuan was controlled by the Chengjia Kingdom. Following the declining central government of the Han dynasty in the second century, the Sichuan basin, surrounded by mountains and easily defensible, became a popular place for upstart generals to found kingdoms that challenged the authority of Yangtze Valley emperors over China.

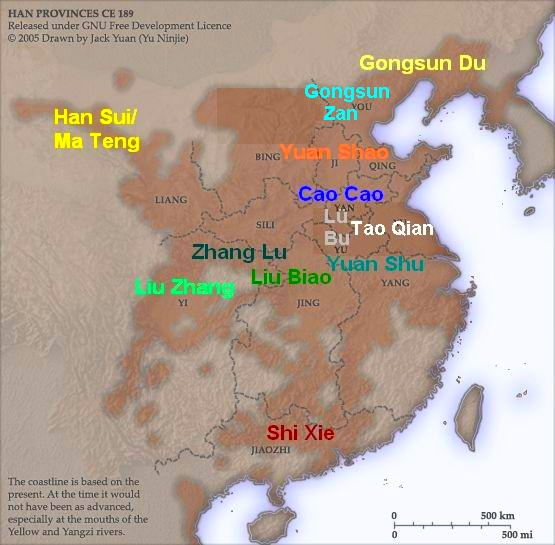
Warlords in China around 194; Liu Bei's takeover of Yi Province meant he seized the positions of Liu Biao and Zhang Lu eventually

=== Three Kingdoms ===
In 221, during the partition following the fall of the Eastern Han – the era of the Three Kingdoms – Liu Bei founded the southwest kingdom of Shu Han (蜀漢; 221–263) in parts of Sichuan, Guizhou, and Yunnan, with Chengdu as its capital. Shu-Han claimed to be the successor to the Han dynasty.

In 263, the Cao Wei of North China conquered the Kingdom of Shu-Han as a step on the path to reuniting China. Salt production became a major business in Ziliujing District. During the Six Dynasties period of Chinese disunity, Sichuan began to be populated by non-Han ethnic minority peoples, owing to the migration of Gelao people from the Yunnan–Guizhou Plateau to the Sichuan basin.

=== Tang dynasty ===
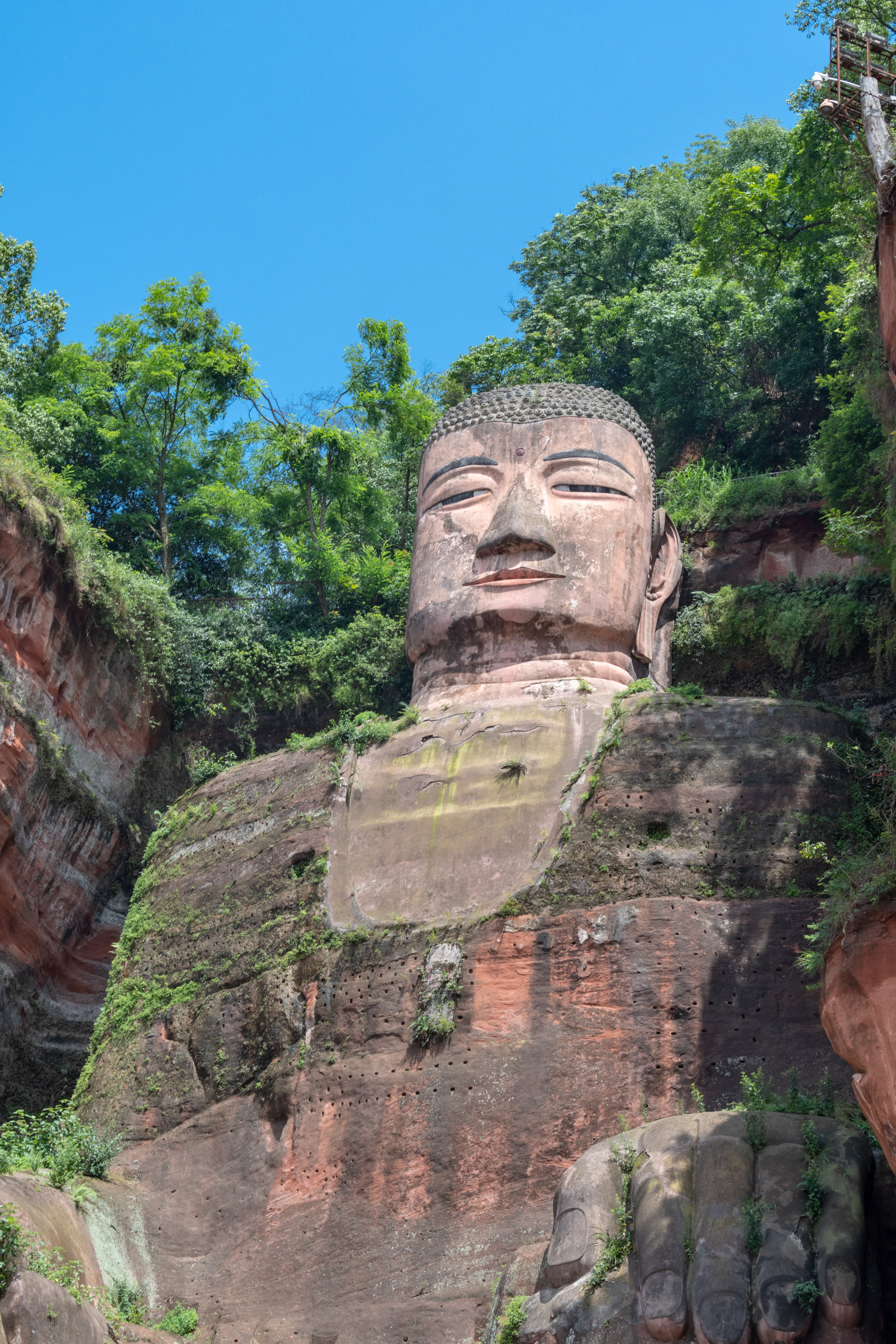
The Leshan Giant Buddha, built during the latter half of the Tang dynasty (618–907).

Sichuan came under the firm control of a Chinese central government during the Sui dynasty, but it was during the subsequent Tang dynasty that Sichuan regained its previous political and cultural prominence for which it was known during the Han. Chengdu became nationally known as a supplier of armies and the home of Du Fu, who is sometimes called China's greatest poet. During the An Lushan Rebellion (755–763), Emperor Xuanzong of Tang fled from Chang'an to Sichuan which became his refuge. The region was torn by constant warfare and economic distress as it was besieged by the Tibetan Empire.

=== Five Dynasties and Ten Kingdoms ===
In the Five Dynasties and Ten Kingdoms period, Sichuan became the heart of the Shu kingdom with its capital in Chengdu. In 925, the kingdom was absorbed into Later Tang but would regain independence under Meng Zhixiang who founded Later Shu in 934. Later Shu would continue until 965 when it was absorbed by the Song.

=== Song and Yuan dynasties ===
During the Song dynasty (960–1279), Sichuanese were able to protect themselves from Tibetan attacks with the help of the central government. There were rebellions against the Song by Li Shun in 994 and Wang Jun in 1000. Sichuan also saw cultural revivals like the great poets Su Xun (蘇洵), Su Shi, and Su Zhe. Although paper currency was known in the Tang dynasty, in 1023 AD, the first true paper money in human history (交子; jiāozǐ) was issued in Chengdu.

It was also during the Song dynasty that the bulk of the native Ba people of eastern Sichuan assimilated into the Han Chinese ethnicity.

In the 12th and 13th centuries, the Southern Song dynasty established coordinated defenses against the Mongolian Yuan dynasty, in Sichuan and Xiangyang. The Southern Song state monopolized the Sichuan tea industry to pay for warhorses, but this state intervention eventually brought devastation to the local economy.

The line of defense was broken through after the first use of firearms in history during the six-year Battle of Xiangyang, which ended in 1273. Allegedly there were a million pieces of unspecified types of skeleton bones belonging to war animals and both Song and Yuan soldiers who perished in the fighting over the city, although the figure may have been grossly exaggerated. The recorded number of families in Sichuan dropped from 2,640,000 families, as recorded from the census taken in 1162 AD, to 120,000 families in 1282 AD.

Possible causes include forced population transfer to nearby areas, evacuation to nearby provinces, census under-reporting or inaccuracy, and war-related deaths. One instance of the deportation of Sichuanese civilians to Mongolia occurred in the aftermath of a battle in 1259 when more than 80,000 people were taken captive from one city in Sichuan and moved to Mongolia.

=== Ming dynasty ===
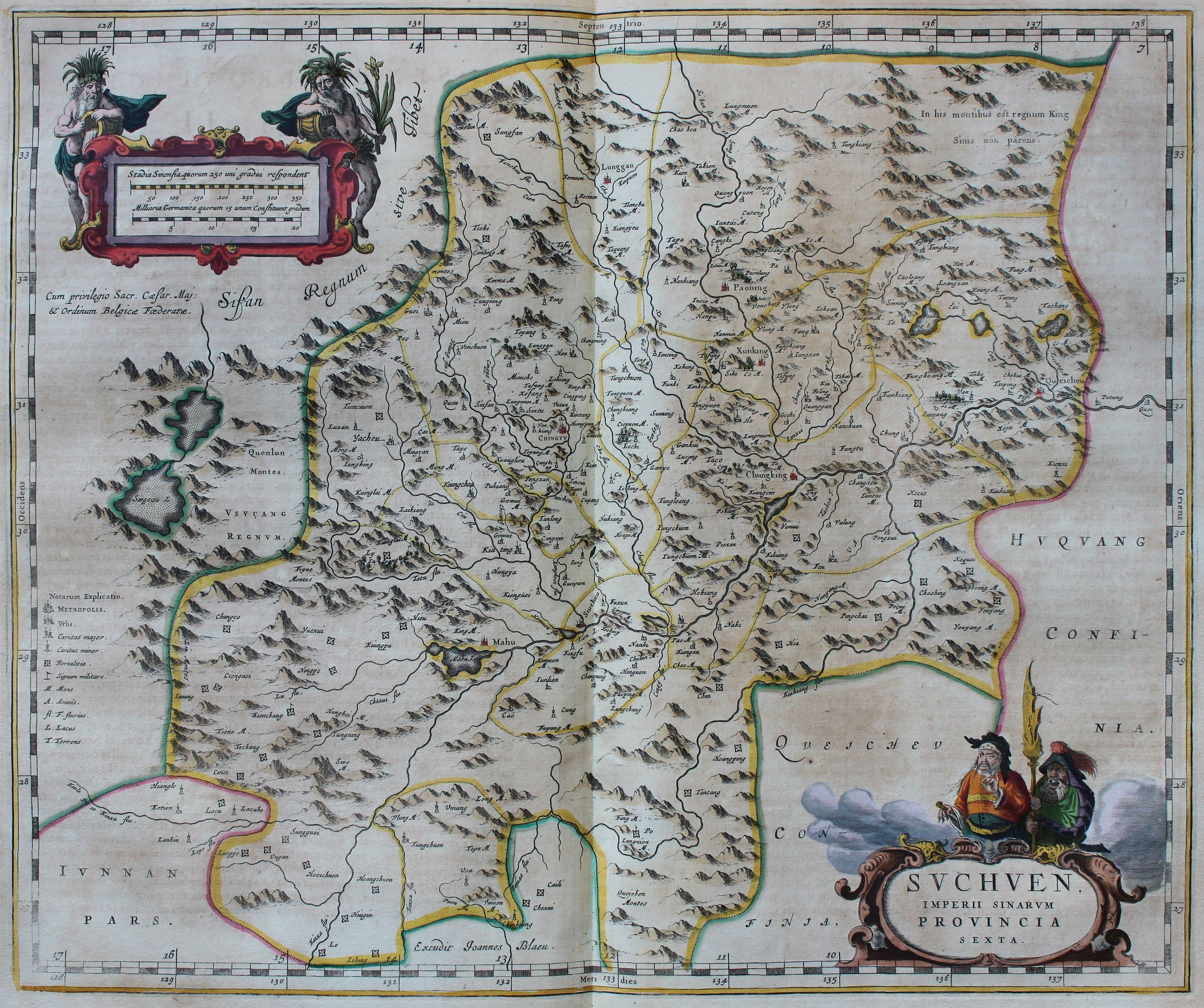
Map of Suchuen (Sichuan) from Willem and Joan Blaeu's 1659 Geographia Blaviana.

The Ming dynasty defeated Ming Yuzhen's Xia polity which ruled Sichuan.

During the Ming dynasty, major architectural works were created in Sichuan. Buddhism remained influential in the region. Bao'en Temple is a well-preserved 15th-century monastery complex built between 1440 and 1446 during the Zhengtong Emperor's reign (1427–64). Dabei Hall enshrines a thousand-armed wooden image of Guanyin and Huayan Hall is a repository with a revolving sutra cabinet. The wall paintings, sculptures, and other ornamental details are masterpieces of the Ming period.

In the middle of the 17th century, the peasant rebel leader Zhang Xianzhong (1606–1646) from Yan'an, Shaanxi Province, nicknamed Yellow Tiger, led his peasant troop from north China to the south and conquered Sichuan. Upon capturing it, he declared himself emperor of the Daxi dynasty (大西王朝). In response to the resistance from local elites, he massacred a large number of people in Sichuan, killing around one in three people. As a result of the massacre as well as years of turmoil during the Ming-Qing transition, the population of Sichuan fell sharply, requiring massive resettlement of people from the neighboring Huguang Province (modern Hubei and Hunan) and other provinces during the Qing dynasty.

=== Qing dynasty ===
Sichuan was originally the origin of the Deng lineage until one of them was hired as an official in Guangdong during the Ming dynasty but during the Qing plan to increase the population in 1671 they came to Sichuan again. In 1904 Deng Xiaoping was born in Sichuan.

During the Qing dynasty, Sichuan was merged with Shaanxi and Shanxi to create "Shenzhuan" during 1680–1731 and 1735–1748. The current borders of Sichuan (which then included Chongqing) were established in the early 18th century. In the aftermath of the Sino-Nepalese War on China's southwestern border, the Qing gave Sichuan's provincial government direct control over the minority-inhabited areas of Sichuan west of Kangding, which had previously been handled by an amban.

A landslide dam on the Dadu River caused by an earthquake gave way on 10 June 1786. The resulting flood killed 100,000 people.

=== Republic of China ===
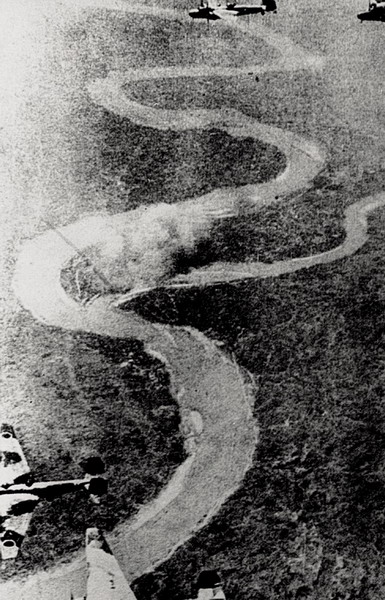
Japanese bombers bombing a road in Chongqing, then part of Sichuan province, during WW2

In the early 20th century, the newly founded Republic of China established the Chuanbian Special Administrative District (川邊特別行政區) on the province's territories to the west of the Sichuan Basin. The Special District later became the province of Xikang, incorporating the areas inhabited by Yi, Tibetan, and Qiang ethnic minorities to its west, and eastern part of today's Tibet Autonomous Region.

In the 20th century, as Beijing, Shanghai, Nanjing, and Wuhan had all been occupied by the Japanese during the Second Sino-Japanese War, the capital of the Republic of China had been temporarily relocated to Chongqing, then a major city in Sichuan. An enduring legacy of this move is those nearby inland provinces, such as Shaanxi, Gansu, and Guizhou, which previously never had modern Western-style universities, began to be developed in this regard. The difficulty of accessing the region overland from the eastern part of China and the foggy climate hindering the accuracy of the Japanese bombing of the Sichuan Basin made the region the stronghold of Chiang Kai-shek's Kuomintang government during 1938–45 and led to the Bombing of Chongqing.

The Second Sino-Japanese War was soon followed by the resumed Chinese Civil War, and the cities of East China were obtained by the Communists one after another, the Kuomintang government again tried to make Sichuan its stronghold on the mainland, although it already saw some Communist activity since it was one area on the road of the Long March. Chiang Kai-shek himself flew to Chongqing from Taiwan in November 1949 to lead the defense. But the same month Chongqing switched to the Communists, followed by Chengdu on 10 December. The Kuomintang general Wang Sheng wanted to stay behind with his troops to continue the anticommunist guerilla war in Sichuan, but was recalled to Taiwan. Many of his soldiers made their way there as well, via Burma.

=== People's Republic of China ===
The People's Republic of China was founded in 1949, and it split Sichuan into four areas and separated Chongqing municipality. Sichuan was reconstituted in 1952, with Chongqing added in 1954, while the former Xikang province was split between Tibet in the west and Sichuan in the east.

The province was deeply affected by the Great Chinese Famine of 1959–1961, during which period some 9.4 million people (13.07% of the population at the time) died.

In 1978, when Deng Xiaoping took power, Sichuan was one of the first provinces to experiment with the market economic enterprise.

From 1955 until 1997, Sichuan had been China's most populous province; the population hit the 100 million mark shortly after the 1982 census figure of 99,730,000. This changed in 1997 when the Sub-provincial city of Chongqing as well as the three surrounding prefectures of Fuling, Wanxian, and Qianjiang were split off into the new Chongqing Municipality. The new municipality was formed to spearhead China's effort to economically develop its western provinces, as well as to coordinate the resettlement of residents from the reservoir areas of the Three Gorges Dam project.

In 1997, when Sichuan split, the sum of the two parts was recorded to be 114,720,000 people. As of 2010, Sichuan ranks as both the 3rd largest (the largest among Chinese provinces with a population greater than 50 million) and 4th most populous province in China.

On 12 May 2008, an earthquake with a magnitude of 7.9/8.0 hit just 79 km (49 mi) northwest of the provincial capital of Chengdu. Official figures recorded a death toll of over 87,000 people, and millions of people were left homeless.

== Administrative divisions ==
Sichuan consists of twenty-one prefecture-level divisions: eighteen prefecture-level cities (including a sub-provincial city) and three autonomous prefectures:

Administrative divisions of Sichuan
Division code	Division	Area in km^{2}	Population 2020	Seat	Divisions			
Division code	Division	Area in km^{2}	Population 2020	Seat	Districts	Counties	Aut. counties	CL cities
510000	Sichuan Province	485,000.00	83,674,866	Chengdu city	55	105	4	19
510100	Chengdu city	12,163.16	20,937,757	Wuhou District	12	3		5
510300	Zigong city	4,373.13	2,489,256	Ziliujing District	4	2		
510400	Panzhihua city	7,423.42	1,212,203	Dong District	3	2		
510500	Luzhou city	12,233.58	4,254,149	Jiangyang District	3	4		
510600	Deyang city	5,951.55	3,456,161	Jingyang District	2	1		3
510700	Mianyang city	20,267.46	4,868,243	Fucheng District	3	4	1	1
510800	Guangyuan city	16,313.70	2,305,657	Lizhou District	3	4		
510900	Suining city	5,323.85	2,814,196	Chuanshan District	2	2		1
511000	Neijiang city	5,385.33	3,140,678	Shizhong District	2	2		1
511100	Leshan city	12,827.49	3,160,168	Shizhong District	4	4	2	1
511300	Nanchong city	12,479.96	5,607,565	Shunqing District	3	5		1
511400	Meishan city	7,173.82	2,955,219	Dongpo District	2	4		
511500	Yibin city	13,293.89	4,588,804	Cuiping District	3	7		
511600	Guang'an city	6,301.41	3,254,883	Guang'an District	2	3		1
511700	Dazhou city	16,591.00	5,385,422	Tongchuan District	2	4		1
511800	Ya'an city	15,213.28	1,434,603	Yucheng District	2	6		
511900	Bazhong city	12,301.26	2,712,894	Bazhou District	2	3		
512000	Ziyang city	7,962.56	2,308,631	Yanjiang District	1	2		
513200	Ngawa Tibetan and Qiang Autonomous Prefecture	82,383.32	822,587	Barkam city		12		1
513300	Garzê Tibetan Autonomous Prefecture	147,681.37	1,107,431	Kangding city		17		1
513400	Liangshan Yi Autonomous Prefecture	60,422.67	4,858,359	Xichang city		14	1	2
Sub-provincial cities

Administrative divisions in Chinese and varieties of romanizations
English	Chinese	Pinyin	Sichuanese Romanzation
Sichuan Province	四川省	Sìchuān Shěng	si4 cuan1 sen3
Chengdu city	成都市	Chéngdū Shì	cen2 du1 si4
Zigong city	自贡市	Zìgòng Shì	
Panzhihua city	攀枝花市	Pānzhīhuā Shì	
Luzhou city	泸州市	Lúzhōu Shì	nu2 zou1 si4
Deyang city	德阳市	Déyáng Shì	
Mianyang city	绵阳市	Miányáng Shì	
Guangyuan city	广元市	Guǎngyuán Shì	
Suining city	遂宁市	Sùiníng Shì	xu4 nin2 si4
Neijiang city	内江市	Nèijiāng Shì	nui4 jiang1 si4
Leshan city	乐山市	Lèshān Shì	
Nanchong city	南充市	Nánchōng Shì	lan2 cong1 si4
Meishan city	眉山市	Méishān Shì	mi2 san1 si4
Yibin city	宜宾市	Yíbīn Shì	ni2 bin1 si4
Guang'an city	广安市	Guǎng'ān Shì	
Dazhou city	达州市	Dázhōu Shì	
Ya'an city	雅安市	Yǎ'ān Shì	
Bazhong city	巴中市	Bāzhōng Shì	
Ziyang city	资阳市	Zīyáng Shì	
Ngawa Tibetan and Qiang Autonomous Prefecture	阿坝藏族羌族自治州	Ābà Zangzú Qiāngzú Zìzhìzhōu	
Garzê Tibetan Autonomous Prefecture	甘孜藏族自治州	Gānzī Zangzú Zìzhìzhōu	
Liangshan Yi Autonomous Prefecture	凉山彝族自治州	Liángshān Yízú Zìzhìzhōu	

The twenty prefectures of Sichuan are subdivided into 183 county-level divisions (53 districts, 17 county-level cities, 109 counties, and 4 autonomous counties). At the end of the year 2017, the total population is 83.02 million.

Population by urban areas of prefecture and county cities
#	Cities	2020 Urban area	2010 Urban area	2020 City proper
1	Chengdu (Note: Jianyang CLC was transferred from Ziyang PLC to Chengdu PLC's jurisdiction after 2010 census.)	13,568,357	6,316,922 (Note: New districts established after 2010 census: Shuangliu (Shuangliu County), Pidu (Pixian County), Xinjin (Xinjin County). These new districts not included in the urban area count of the pre-expanded city.)	20,937,757
2	Mianyang	1,549,499	967,007 (Note: New district established after 2010 census: Anzhou (Anxian County). The new district not included in the urban area count of the pre-expanded city.)	4,868,243
3	Yibin	1,290,555	549,650 (Note: New districts established after 2010 census: Nanxi (Nanxi County), Xuzhou (Yibin County). These new districts not included in the urban area count of the pre-expanded city.)	4,588,804
4	Nanchong	1,254,455	890,402	5,607,565
5	Luzhou	1,128,479	742,274	4,254,149
6	Dazhou	1,112,996	379,467 (Note: New district established after 2010 census: Dachuan (Daxian County). The new district not included in the urban area count of the pre-expanded city.)	5,385,422
7	Zigong	868,565	666,204	2,489,256
8	Suining	829,356	549,826	2,814,196
9	Leshan	819,038	678,752	3,160,168
10	Meishan	732,757	347,546 (Note: New district established after 2010 census: Pengshan (Pengshan County). The new district not included in the urban area count of the pre-expanded city.)	2,955,219
11	Deyang	716,820	530,122 (Note: New district established after 2010 census: Luojiang (Luojiang County). The new district not included in the urban area count of the pre-expanded city.)	3,456,161
12	Panzhihua	686,063	631,258	1,212,203
13	Xichang	636,367	466,732	part of Liangshan Prefecture
14	Neijiang	615,845	586,445	3,140,678
15	Jianyang	591,224	365,386	see Chengdu
16	Guangyuan	556,842	407,756	2,305,657
17	Bazhong	549,128	477,235	2,712,894
18	Guang'an	485,180	317,502	3,254,883
19	Ziyang	462,287	376,387	2,308,631
20	Shehong	442,852	(Note: Shehong County is currently known as Shehong CLC after 2010 census.)	see Suining
21	Dujiangyan	436,619	317,627	see Chengdu
22	Chongzhou	391,259	206,448	see Chengdu
23	Jiangyou	387,892	312,154	see Mianyang
24	Pengzhou	383,409	263,199	see Chengdu
25	Guanghan	368,933	235,872	see Deyang
26	Ya'an	343,062	208,940 (Note: New district established after 2010 census: Mingshan (Mingshan County). The new district not included in the urban area count of the pre-expanded city.)	1,434,603
27	Qionglai	322,777	190,099	see Chengdu
28	Langzhong	303,044	242,535	see Nanchong
29	Longchang	275,419	(Note: Longchang County is currently known as Longchang CLC after 2010 census.)	see Neijiang
30	Emeishan	252,682	220,349	see Leshan
31	Mianzhu	232,761	192,001	see Deyang
32	Shifang	223,320	187,473	see Deyang
33	Wanyuan	172,148	129,617	see Dazhou
34	Huaying	145,959	119,228	see Guang'an
35	Kangding	69,728	(Note: Kangding County is currently known as Kangding CLC after 2010 census.)	part of Garzê Prefecture
36	Barkam	31,405	(Note: Barkam County is currently known as Barkam CLC after 2010 census.)	part of Ngawa Prefecture

== Geography and biodiversity ==
Sichuan consists of two very distinct geographic parts. The eastern part of the province is mostly within the fertile Sichuan basin (which is shared by Sichuan with Chongqing Municipality). The western Sichuan consists of numerous mountain ranges forming the easternmost part of the Tibetan Plateau, which are known generically as the Hengduan Mountains. One of these ranges, the Daxue Mountains, contains the highest point of the province Gongga Shan, at 7,556 m (24,790 ft) above sea level. The mountains are formed by the collision of the Tibetan Plateau with the Yangtze Plate. Faults here include the Longmenshan Fault which ruptured during the 2008 Sichuan earthquake. Other mountain ranges surround the Sichuan Basin from north, east, and south. Among them are the Daba Mountains, in the province's northeast.

The Yangtze River and its tributaries flow through the mountains of western Sichuan and the Sichuan Basin; thus, the province is upstream of the great cities that stand along the Yangtze River further to the east, such as Chongqing, Wuhan, Nanjing, and Shanghai. One of the major tributaries of the Yangtze within the province is the Min River of central Sichuan, which joins the Yangtze at Yibin. There are also a number of other rivers, such as the Jialing River, Tuo River, Yalong River, Wu River, and Jinsha River, and any four of the various rivers are often grouped as the "four rivers" that the name of Sichuan is commonly and mistakenly believed to mean.

Sichuan borders Qinghai to the northwest, Gansu to the north, Shaanxi to the northeast, Chongqing to the east, Guizhou to the southeast, Yunnan to the south, and the Tibet Autonomous Region to the west.

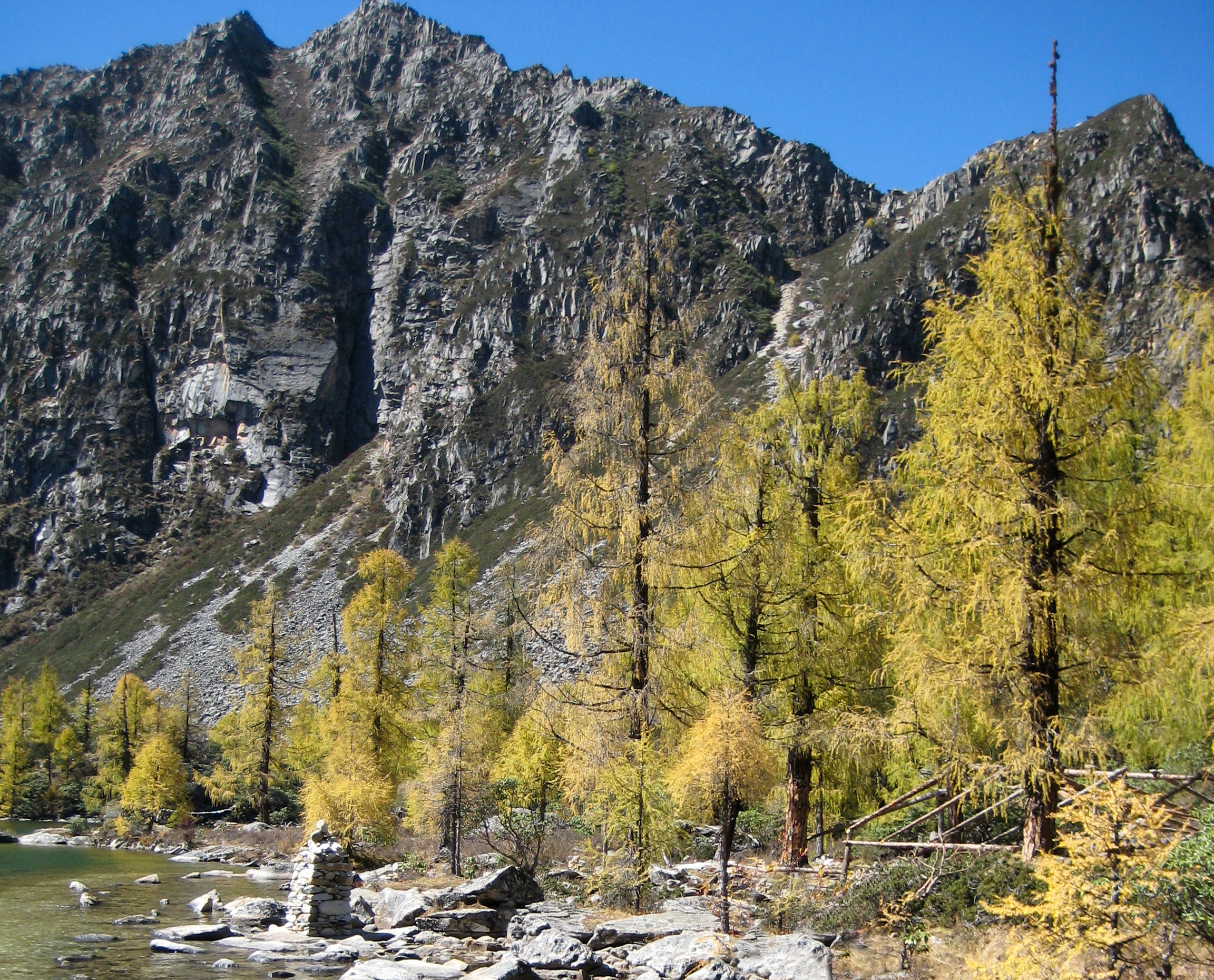
Larix potaninii in fall.

Garzê Prefecture

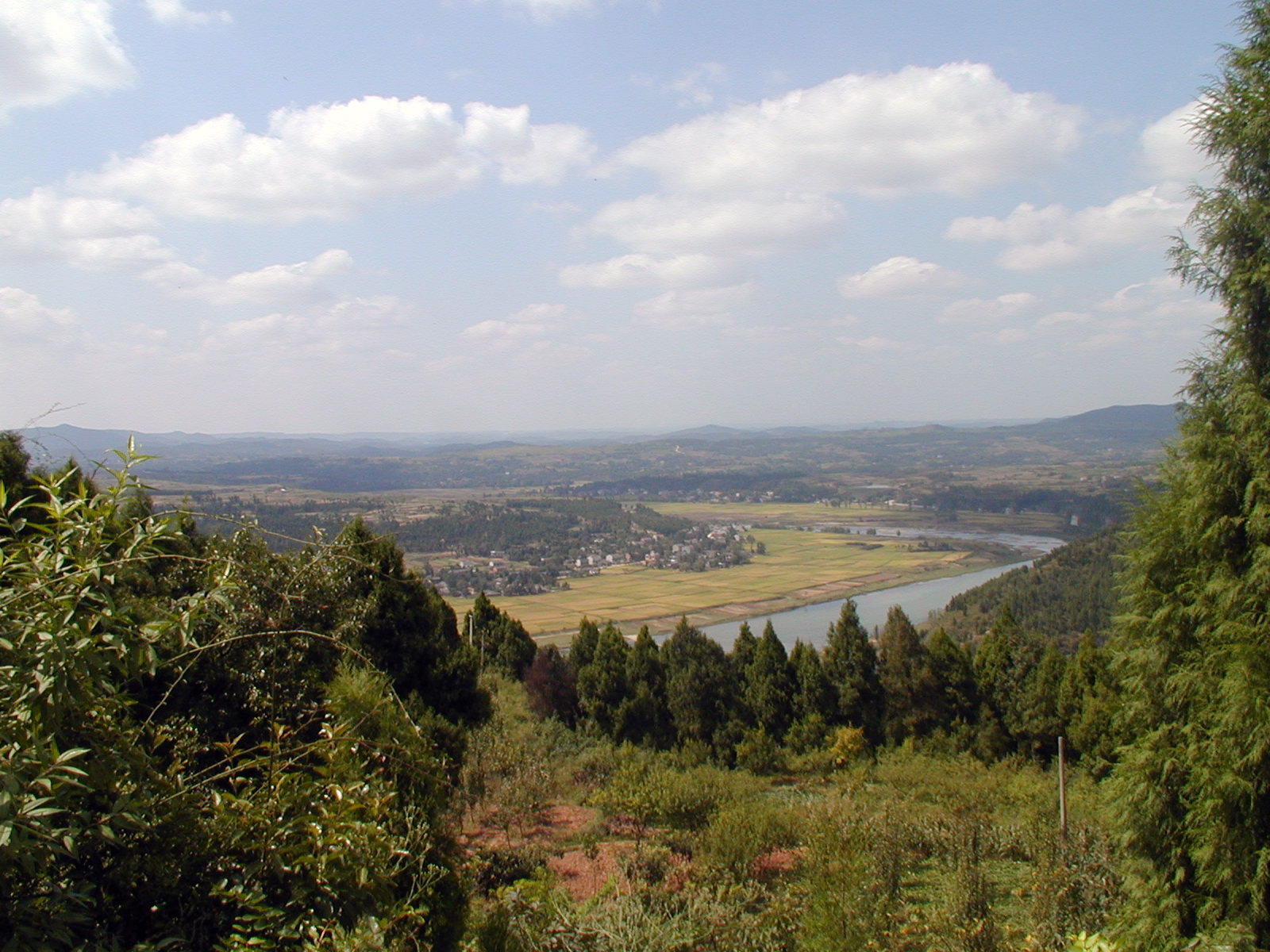
Zitong County

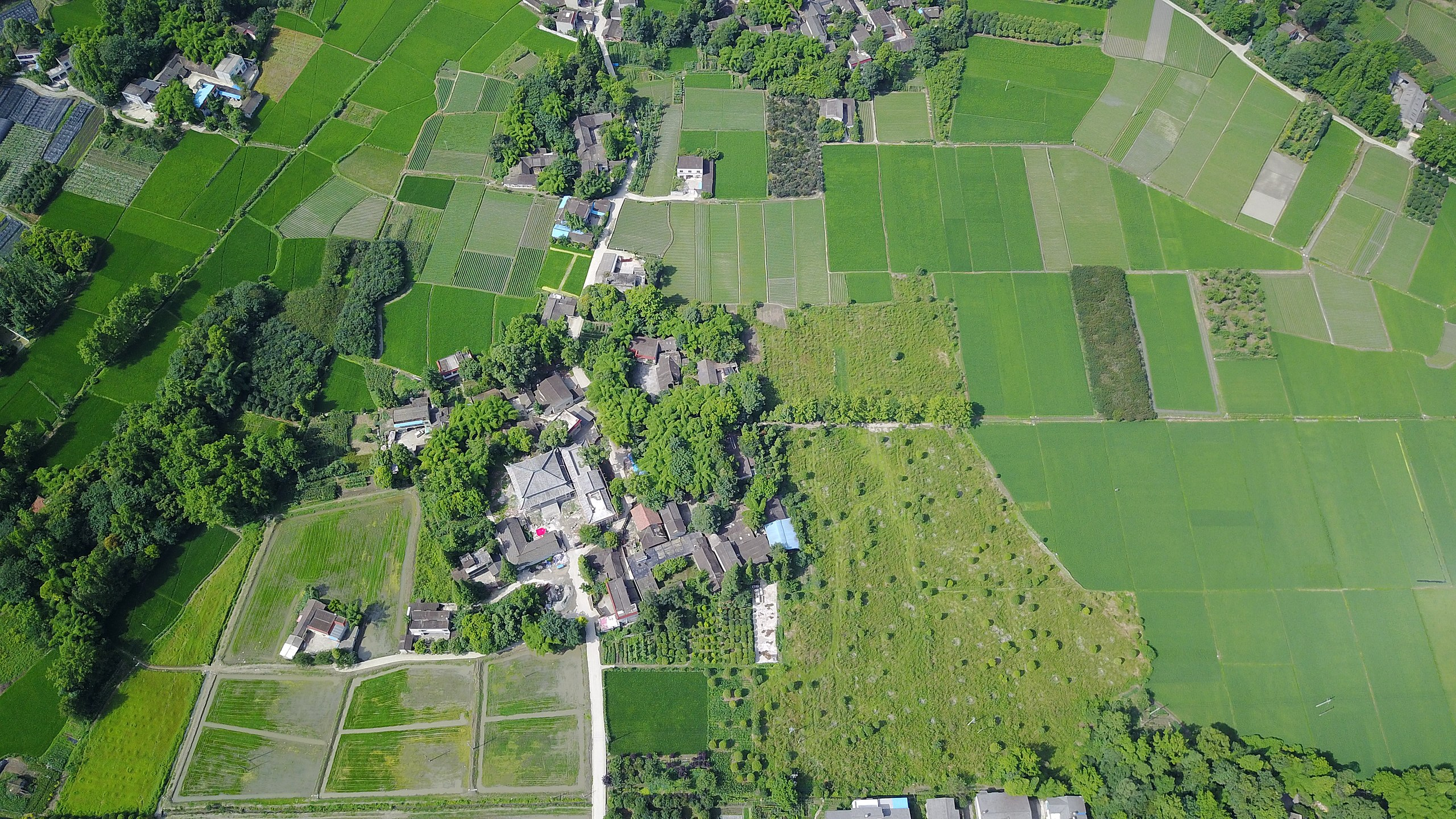
Linpan in Chengdu Plain is a well-known landmark in Chengdu Plain, Sichuan.

=== Giant panda ===
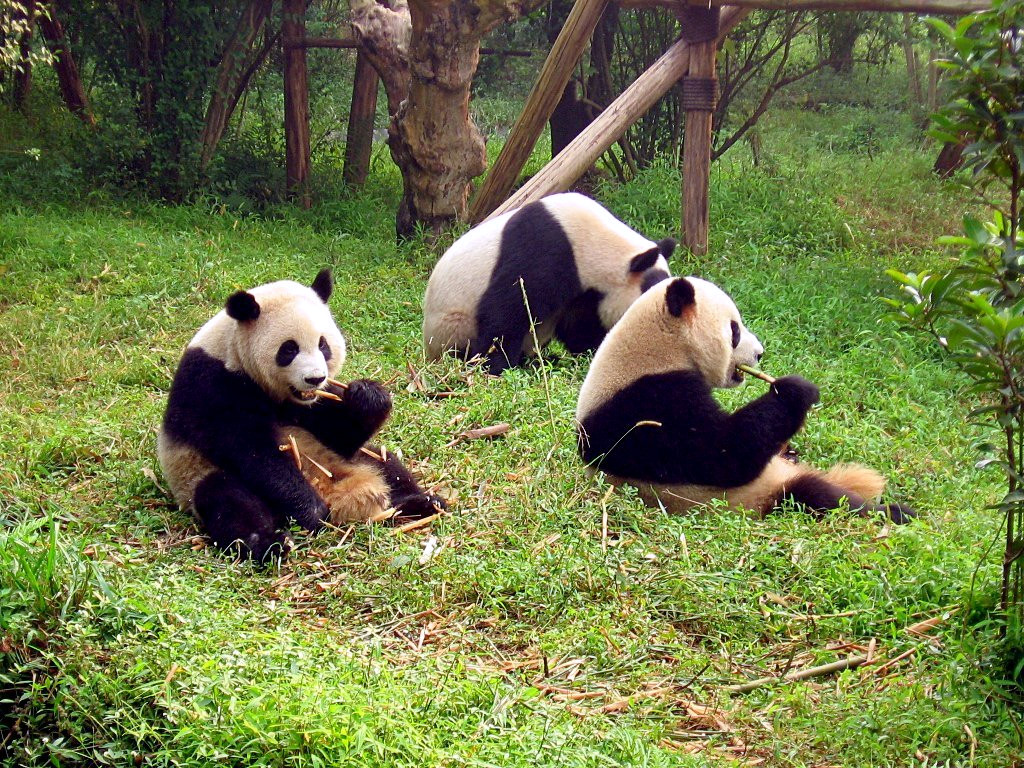
Giant pandas eating bamboo in Chengdu, Sichuan

Giant pandas live in bamboo forests and low mountainous areas such as the Minshan Mountains in Sichuan. The majority of the panda population lives in Sichuan, with their range spreading into Shaanxi and Gansu. As it is abundant where they live, pandas' diet consists of 99% bamboo, with small other plants, or small animals consisting of the other 1%. As the panda is native to China, they have become a national symbol of China.

=== Climate ===
A Köppen climate classification map of Sichuan

Due to great differences in terrain, the climate of the province is highly variable. In general, it has strong monsoonal influences, with rainfall heavily concentrated in the summer. Under the Köppen climate classification, the Sichuan Basin (including Chengdu) in the eastern half of the province experiences a humid subtropical climate (Köppen Cwa or Cfa), with long, hot, wet summers and short, mild to cool, dry, and cloudy winters. Consequently, it has China's lowest sunshine totals.

The western region has mountainous areas producing a cooler but sunnier climate. Having cool to very cold winters and mild summers, temperatures generally decrease with greater elevation. Due to high altitude and inland location, the far northwestern areas like Garzê County and Zoigê County exhibit a subalpine climate (Köppen Dwc) or even an alpine climate (ETH), featuring frigid winters down to −30 °C or −22 °F and even cold summer nights. The region is geologically active with landslides and earthquakes. Average elevation ranges from 2,000 to 3,500 metres or 6,600 to 11,500 feet; average temperatures range from 0 to 15 °C or 32 to 59 °F.

The southern part of the province, including Panzhihua and Xichang, has a sunny climate with short, very mild winters and very warm to hot summers.

== Politics ==
The politics of Sichuan is structured in a dual party-government system like all other governing institutions in mainland China.

The governor of Sichuan is the highest-ranking official in the People's Government of Sichuan. However, in the province's dual party-government governing system, the Governor has less power than the Party Secretary of Sichuan, colloquially termed the "Sichuan CPC Party Chief".

=== Governance ===
The Sichuan Provincial Prison Administrative Bureau is the main corrections agency in Sichuan.

The Sichuan Provincial Public Security Department is the primary law enforcement agency in Sichuan. It has a SWAT unit, a forestry unit, an anti-drug unit, an economic crime unit, a food safety unit and an investigation unit. In 2021, the agency had a budget of 45.8 million Renminbi.

On 10 July 2017, the Sichuan Provincial Public Security Department established the Sichuan Provincial Expressways Public Security Bureau (Chinese: 四川高速公路公安局), a provincial Highway patrol agency.

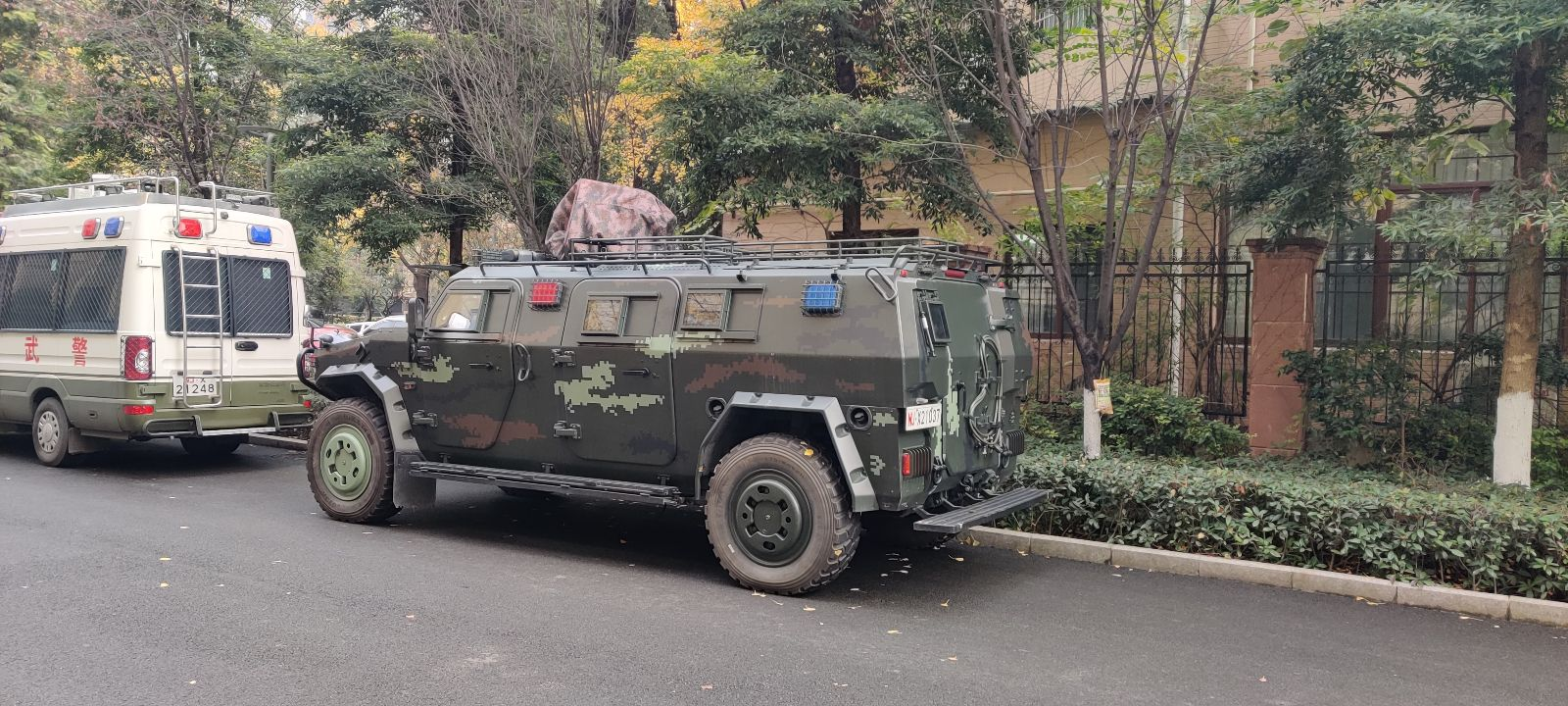
A CSK-181 of the People's Armed Police Sichuan Corps

The People's Armed Police Sichuan Corps provides paramilitary law enforcement and disaster relief services within Sichuan province. The Yibin Detachment was deployed for disaster relief during the 2025 Junlian Landslides of 8 February 2025 in Junlian County, Yibin.

The Sichuan Provincial Fire and Rescue Department (Chinese: 四川省消防救援总队) is in charge of firefighting and rescue duties within the province.

== Economy ==
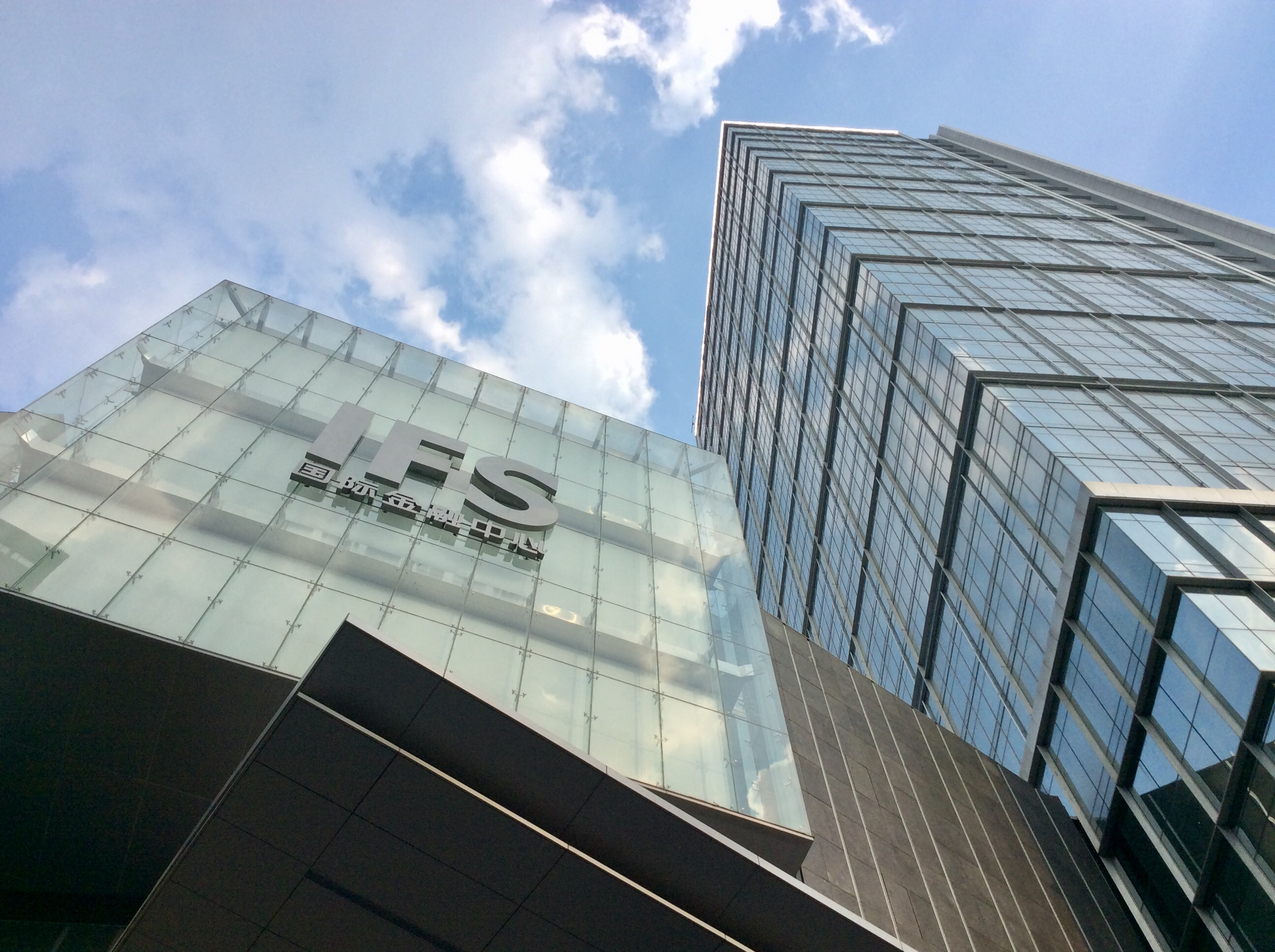
Chengdu IFS

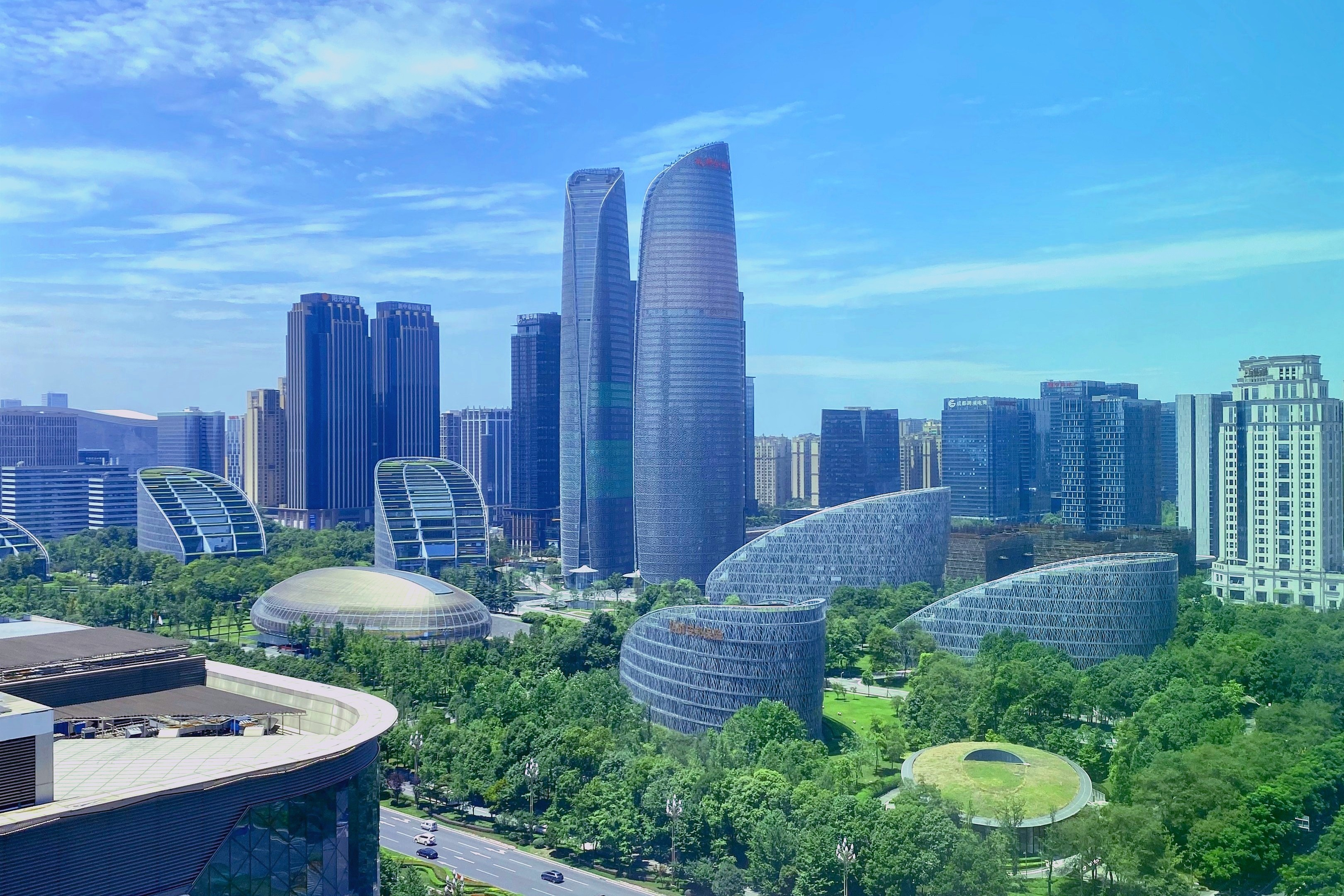
Tianfu New Area

Sichuan is the 5th-largest provincial economy of China, the largest in Western China and the largest among inland provinces. As of 2021, its nominal GDP was 5,385 billion yuan (US$847.68 billion), ahead of the GDP of Turkey of 815 billion. Compared to a country, it would be the 18th-largest economy as well as the 19th most populous as of 2021. As of 2021, its nominal GDP per capita was 64,357 RMB (US$10,120). In 2021, the per capita net income of rural residents was 17,575 yuan (US$2760). The per capita disposable income of the urbanites averaged 41,444 yuan (US$6510).

Sichuan has been historically known as the "Province of Abundance". It is one of the major agricultural production bases of China. Grain, including rice and wheat, is the major product with output that ranked first in China in 1999. Commercial crops include citrus fruits, sugar cane, sweet potatoes, peaches, and grapes. Sichuan also had the largest output of pork among all the provinces and the second largest output of silkworm cocoons in 1999. Sichuan is rich in mineral resources. It has more than 132 kinds of proven underground mineral resources including vanadium, titanium, and lithium is the largest in China. The Panxi region alone possesses 13.3% of the reserves of iron, 93% of titanium, 69% of vanadium, and 83% of cobalt in the whole country. Sichuan also possesses China's largest proven natural gas reserves (such as the Dazhou and Yuanba gas fields), the majority of which are transported to more developed eastern regions.

Sichuan is one of the major industrial centers of China. It was a major recipient of China's investment in industrial capacity during the Third Front campaign. In addition to heavy industries such as coal, energy, iron, and steel, the province has also established a light industrial sector comprising building materials, wood processing, food, and silk processing. Chengdu and Mianyang are the production centers for textiles and electronics products. Deyang, Panzhihua, and Yibin are the production centers for machinery, metallurgical industries, and wine, respectively. Sichuan's wine production accounted for 21.9% of the country's total production in 2000.

Great strides have been made in developing Sichuan into a modern hi-tech industrial base, by encouraging both domestic and foreign investments in electronics and information technology (such as software), machinery and metallurgy (including automobiles), hydropower, pharmaceutical, food and beverage industries.

The auto industry is an important and key sector of the machinery industry in Sichuan. Most of the auto manufacturing companies are located in Chengdu, Mianyang, Nanchong, and Luzhou.

Other important industries in Sichuan include aerospace and defense (military) industries. A number of China's rockets (Long March rockets) and satellites were launched from the Xichang Satellite Launch Center, located in the city of Xichang.

Sichuan's landscapes and rich historical relics have also made the province a center for tourism.

The Three Gorges Dam, the largest dam ever constructed, was built on the Yangtze River in nearby Hubei province to control flooding in the Sichuan Basin, neighboring Yunnan province, and downstream. The plan is hailed by some as China's efforts to shift towards alternative energy sources and to further develop its industrial and commercial bases, but has been denounced for mass resettlement, loss of archeological sites, and ecological damage.

=== Economic development zones ===
==== Chengdu Hi-tech Comprehensive Free Trade Zone ====
Chengdu Hi-tech Comprehensive Free Trade Zone was established with the approval of the State Council on 18 October 2010, and passed the national acceptance on 25 February 2011. It was officially operated in May 2011. Chengdu High-tech Comprehensive Free Trade Zone is integrated and expanded from the former Chengdu Export Processing Zone and Chengdu Bonded Logistics Center. it is located in the Chengdu West High-tech Industrial Development Zone, with an area of 4.68 square kilometers and divided into three areas A, B, and C. The industries focus on notebook computer manufacturing, tablet computer manufacturing, wafer manufacturing, chip packaging testing, electronic components, precision machining, and the biopharmaceutical industry. Chengdu Hi-Tech Comprehensive Free Trade Zone has attracted the top 500 multinational enterprises such as Intel, Foxconn, Texas Instruments, Dell, Morse, and so on.

In 2020, the Chengdu Hi-Tech Comprehensive Free Trade Zone achieved a total import and export volume of 549.1 billion yuan (including the Shuangliu Sub-zone), accounting for 68% of the province's total foreign trade import and export volume, ranking first in the national comprehensive insurance zone import and export volume for three consecutive years.

==== Chengdu Economic and Technological Development Zone ====
Chengdu Economic and Technological Development Zone (Chinese: 成都经济技术开发区; pinyin: Chéngdū jīngjì jìshù kāifā qū) was approved as state-level development zone in February 2000. The zone now has a developed area of 10.25 km^{2} (3.96 sq mi) and a planned area of 26 km^{2} (10 sq mi). Chengdu Economic and Technological Development Zone (CETDZ) lies 13.6 km (8.5 mi) east of Chengdu, the capital city of Sichuan Province and the hub of transportation and communication in southwest China. The zone has attracted investors and developers from more than 20 countries to carry out their projects there. Industries encouraged in the zone include mechanical, electronic, new building materials, medicine, and food processing.

==== Chengdu Export Processing Zone ====
Chengdu Export Processing Zone (Chinese: 成都出口加工区; pinyin: Chéngdū chūkǒu jiāgōng qū)) was ratified by the State Council as one of the first 15 export processing zones in the country in April 2000. In 2002, the state ratified the establishment of the Sichuan Chengdu Export Processing West Zone with a planned area of 1.5 km^{2} (0.58 sq mi), located inside the west region of the Chengdu Hi-tech Zone.

==== Chengdu Hi-Tech Industrial Development Zone ====
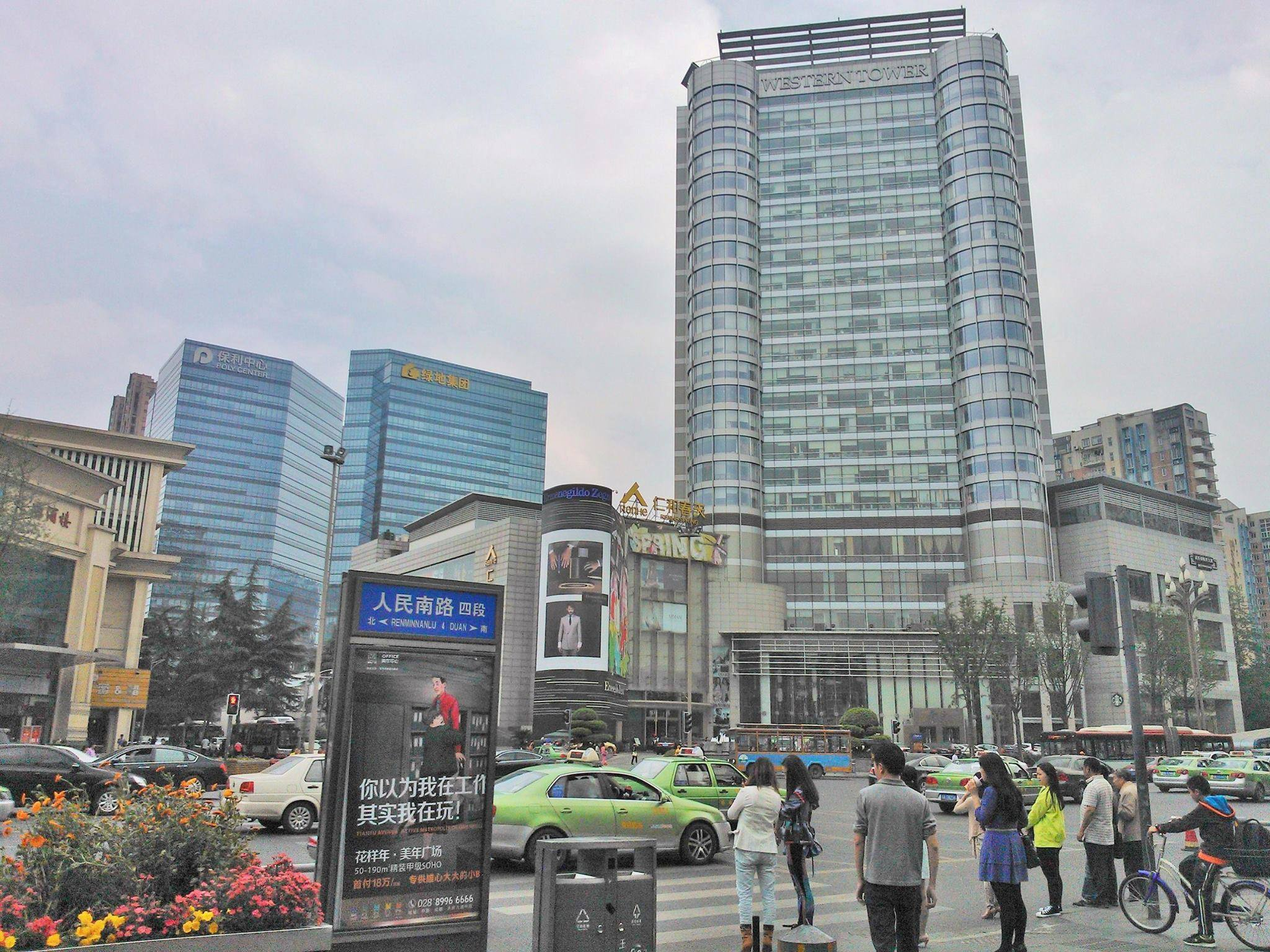
South Renmin Road, Chengdu

Established in 1988, Chengdu Hi-tech Industrial Development Zone (Chinese: 成都高新技术产业开发区; pinyin: Chéngdū Gāoxīn Jìshù Chǎnyè Kāifā Qū) was approved as one of the first national hi-tech development zones in 1991. In 2000, it was open to APEC and has been recognized as a national advanced hi-tech development zone in successive assessment activities held by China's Ministry of Science and Technology. It ranks 5th among the 53 national hi-tech development zones in China in terms of comprehensive strength.

Chengdu Hi-tech Development Zone covers an area of 82.5 km^{2} (31.9 sq mi), consisting of South Park and West Park. By relying on the city sub-center, which is under construction, South Park is focusing on creating a modernized industrial park of science and technology with scientific and technological innovation, incubation R&D, modern service industry, and Headquarters economy playing leading roles. Priority has been given to the development of the software industry. Located on both sides of the "Chengdu-Dujiangyan-Jiuzhaigou" golden tourism channel, the West Park aims at building a comprehensive industrial park targeting industrial clustering with complete supportive functions. West Park gives priority to three major industries i.e. electronic information, biomedicine, and precision machinery.

==== Mianyang Hi-Tech Industrial Development Zone ====
Mianyang Hi-Tech Industrial Development Zone was established in 1992, with a planned area of 43 km^{2} (17 sq mi). The zone is situated 96 kilometers away from Chengdu and is 8 km (5.0 mi) away from Mianyang Airport. Since its establishment, the zone accumulated 177.4 billion yuan of industrial output, 46.2 billion yuan of gross domestic product, and fiscal revenue of 6.768 billion yuan. There are more than 136 high-tech enterprises in the zone and they accounted for more than 90% of the total industrial output.

The zone is a leader in the electronic information industry, biological medicine, new materials, and the production of motor vehicles and parts.

== Transportation ==
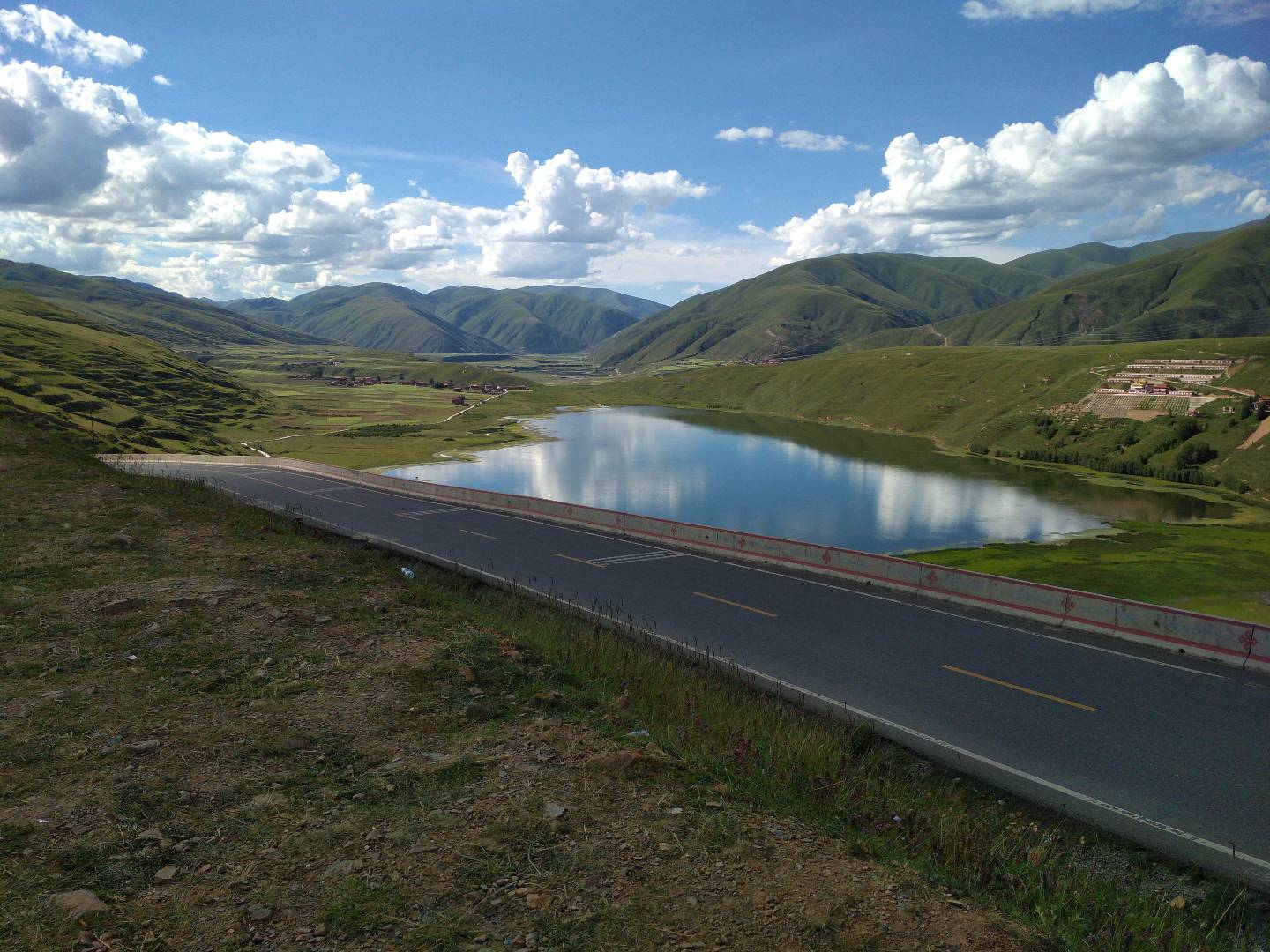
Sichuan–Tibet Highway passes by Lake Kasa in Luhuo County.

For millennia, Sichuan's rugged and riverine landscape presented enormous challenges to the development of transportation infrastructure, and the lack of roads out of the Sichuan Basin contributed to the region's isolation. Since the 1950s, numerous highways and railways have been built through the Qinling in the north and the Bashan in the east. Dozens of bridges across the Yangtze and its tributaries to the south and west have brought greater connectivity with Yunnan and Tibet.

=== Airports ===
Chengdu Shuangliu International Airport is the 4th-busiest airport in mainland China. It was among the world's top 30 busiest airports in 2015, and the busiest in western and central China. It was also the fifth-busiest airport in terms of cargo traffic in China in 2013. Chengdu airport is the hub of Sichuan Airlines, Chengdu Airlines, Shenzhen Airlines, Tibet Airlines, China Southern Airlines, China Eastern Airlines, Lucky Air, and Air China. Alongside Shuangliu Airport, Chengdu Tianfu International Airport has opened in 2021.

Chengdu airports are also 144-hour transit visa-free airports for foreigners from 53 countries.

=== Expressways ===
On 3 November 2007, the Sichuan Transportation Bureau announced that the Suining-Chongqing Expressway was completed after three years of construction. After the completion of the Chongqing section of the road, the 36.64 km (22.77 mi) expressway connected Chengdu-Nanchong Expressway and formed the shortest expressway from Chengdu to Chongqing. The new expressway is 50 km (31 mi) shorter than the pre-existing road between Chengdu and Chongqing; thus journey time between the two cities was reduced by an hour, now taking two and a half hours. The Sui-Yu Expressway is a four-lane overpass with a speed limit of 80 km/h (50 mph). The total investment was 1.045 billion yuan.

=== Rail ===
China Railway Chengdu Group is headquartered in Chengdu, the capital of Sichuan Province, managing railway systems in Sichuan, Chongqing, and Guizhou. Sichuan's major railways in Sichuan include the Baoji–Chengdu, Chengdu–Chongqing, Chengdu–Kunming, Neijiang–Kunming, Suining–Chongqing, and Chengdu–Dazhou railways. High-speed railways in Sichuan include the Chengdu–Chongqing high-speed railway, Xi'an-Chengdu high-speed railway, Chengdu-Guiyang high-speed railway, and Chengdu–Kunming high-speed railway. A suburban railway connects Chengdu and Dujiangyan.

== Demographics ==
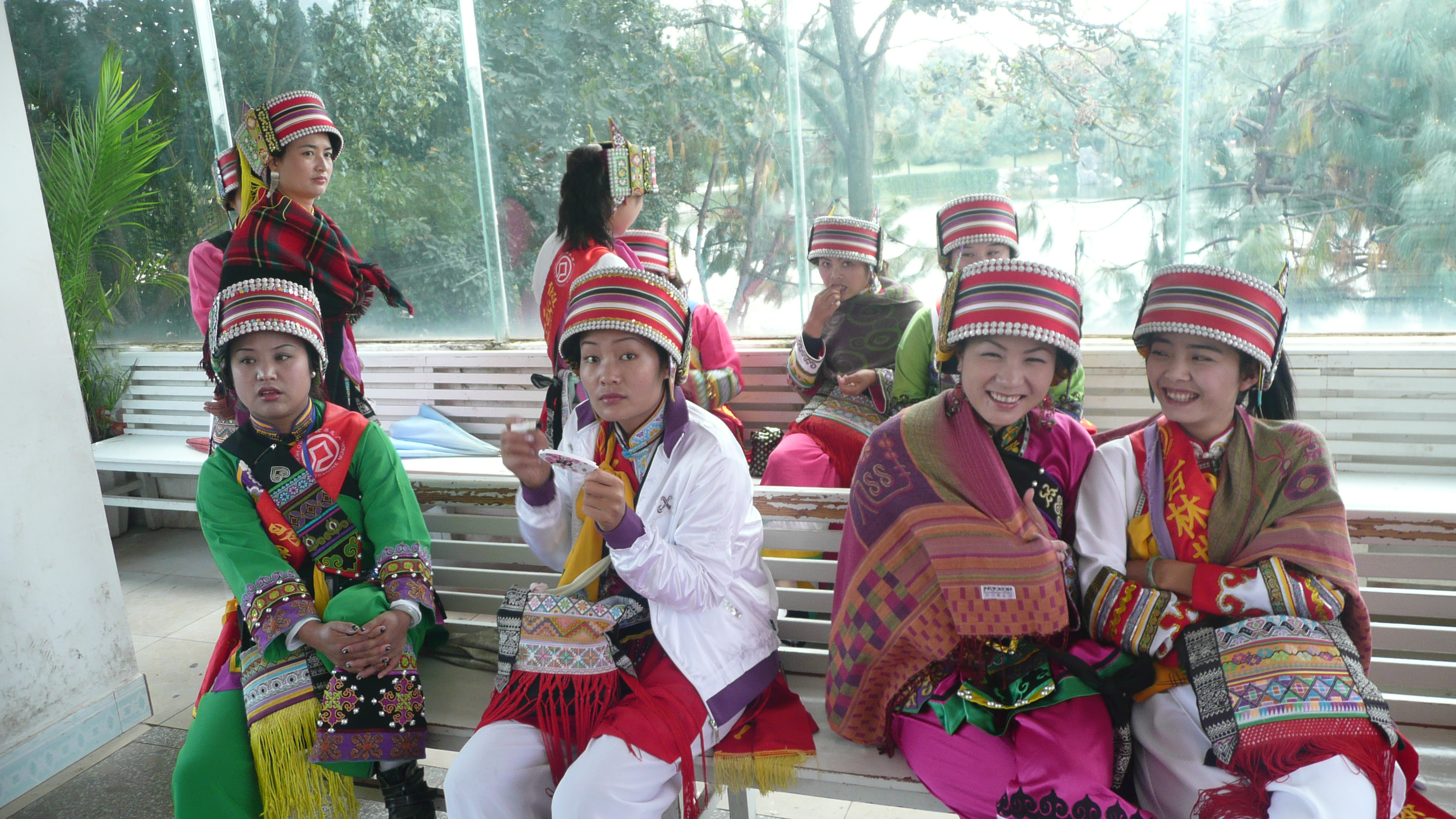
The Yi are the largest ethnic minority group in Sichuan.

Historical population
Year	Pop.	±%
1912	48,130,000	—
1928	47,992,000	−0.3%
1936–37	52,706,000	+9.8%
1947	47,437,000	−10.0%
1954	62,303,999	+31.3%
1964	67,956,490	+9.1%
1982	99,713,310	+46.7%
1990	107,218,173	+7.5%
2000	82,348,296	−23.2%
2010	80,418,200	−2.3%
2020	83,674,866	+4.0%
Chongqing was part of Sichuan Province until 1939 and 1954 to 1997. Xikang Province dissolved in 1955 and parts were incorporated into Sichuan Province.

The majority of the province's population is Han Chinese (95% of the provincial population), who are found scattered throughout the region except for the far western areas. Thus, significant minorities of Tibetan, Yi, Qiang, and Nakhi people reside in the western portion that is impacted by inclement weather and natural disasters, environmentally fragile, and impoverished. Sichuan's capital of Chengdu is home to a large community of Tibetans, with 30,000 permanent Tibetan residents and up to 200,000 Tibetan floating population. The Eastern Lipo, included with either the Yi or the Lisu people, as well as the A-Hmao, also are among the ethnic groups of the provinces.

Sichuan was China's most populous province before Chongqing became a directly controlled municipality; it is currently the fourth most populous, after Guangdong, Shandong, and Henan. As of 1832, Sichuan was the most populous of the 18 provinces in China, with an estimated population at that time of 21 million. It was the third most populous sub-national entity in the world, after Uttar Pradesh, India, and the Russian Soviet Federative Socialist Republic until 1991, when the Soviet Union was dissolved. It is also one of the only eight subnational divisions to ever reach 100 million people (Uttar Pradesh, Russian RSFSR, Maharashtra, Sichuan, Bihar, Shandong, Guangdong, and Punjab). It is currently ranked 10th.

Largest cities in Sichuan Source: China Urban Construction Statistical Yearbook 2018 Urban Population and Urban Temporary Population
Rank		Pop.	Rank		Pop.
1	Chengdu	8,379,700	11	Neijiang	654,100
2	Luzhou	1,619,700	12	Xichang	577,300
3	Mianyang	1,402,000	13	Meishan	552,000
4	Nanchong	1,370,000	14	Suining	544,300
5	Yibin	1,295,900	15	Guangyuan	535,300
6	Zigong	1,164,000	16	Bazhong	458,000
7	Dazhou	908,400	17	Guang'an	371,700
8	Leshan	812,000	18	Jianyang	368,000
9	Deyang	662,100	19	Jiangyou	356,500
10	Panzhihua	659,400	20	Guanghan	338,600

=== Religion ===
Religion in Sichuan (Note: Some of the data collected by the Chinese General Social Survey (CGSS) of 2009 and by the Chinese Spiritual Life Survey (CSLS) of 2007 have been reported and assembled by Xiuhua Wang (2015) in order to confront the proportion of people identifying with two similar social structures: ① Christian churches, and ② the traditional Chinese religion of the lineage (i.e. people believing and worshiping ancestral deities of lineage "churches" and ancestral shrines). Data for other religions with a significant presence in China (deity cults, Buddhism, Taoism, folk religious sects, Islam, et al.) were not reported by Wang and come from different sources.)
1. Chinese religion (also including Confucians, Taoists and sects other than I-Kuan Tao, or irreligious people (71.3%)
2. Buddhism (Note: Based on a 2006 survey of the distribution of Buddhist institutions in China, assuming that the percentage of institutions per capita is consistent with the percentage of Buddhists (which has been proved so by data on other regions), the Buddhist religion would account for between 10% and 20% (≈15%) of the population of Sichuan.) (15.0%)
3. Chinese ancestral religion (10.6%)
4. Yiguandao (2.40%)
5. Christianity (0.68%)
6. Islam (Note: As of 2010 there are 11,200 Muslims in Sichuan.) (0.10%)

The predominant religions in Sichuan are Chinese folk religions, Taoist traditions, and Chinese Buddhism. According to surveys conducted in 2007 and 2009, 10.6% of the population believes and is involved in cults of ancestors, while 0.68% of the population identifies as Christian. According to the Japanese publication Tokyo Sentaku in 1999, there were 2 million members of Yiguandao (Tiandao) in Sichuan, equal to 2.4% of the province's population.

The reports did not give figures for other types of religion; the vast majority may be either irreligious or involved in Chinese folk religion, Buddhism, etc. Tibetan Buddhism is widespread, especially in areas inhabited by ethnic Tibetans. Sichuan is one of the cradles of the early Heavenly Masters' Taoist religious movements. Ethnic minorities often practice their own ethnic religions, often syncretically, such as Daba, Bon and Dongba.

According to "Vestiges of Zoroastrianism in Medieval Sichuan" by Yao Chongxin, professor at Sun Yat-sen University, Zoroastrianism flourished during the period of Tang (618–907), Former Shu (907–925), Later Shu (934–965), and Song (960–1279).

A Chabad Jewish Center was established in Chengdu in 2012, after moving five times, a permanent location was secured at Wuhou District.

Religious sites in Sichuan

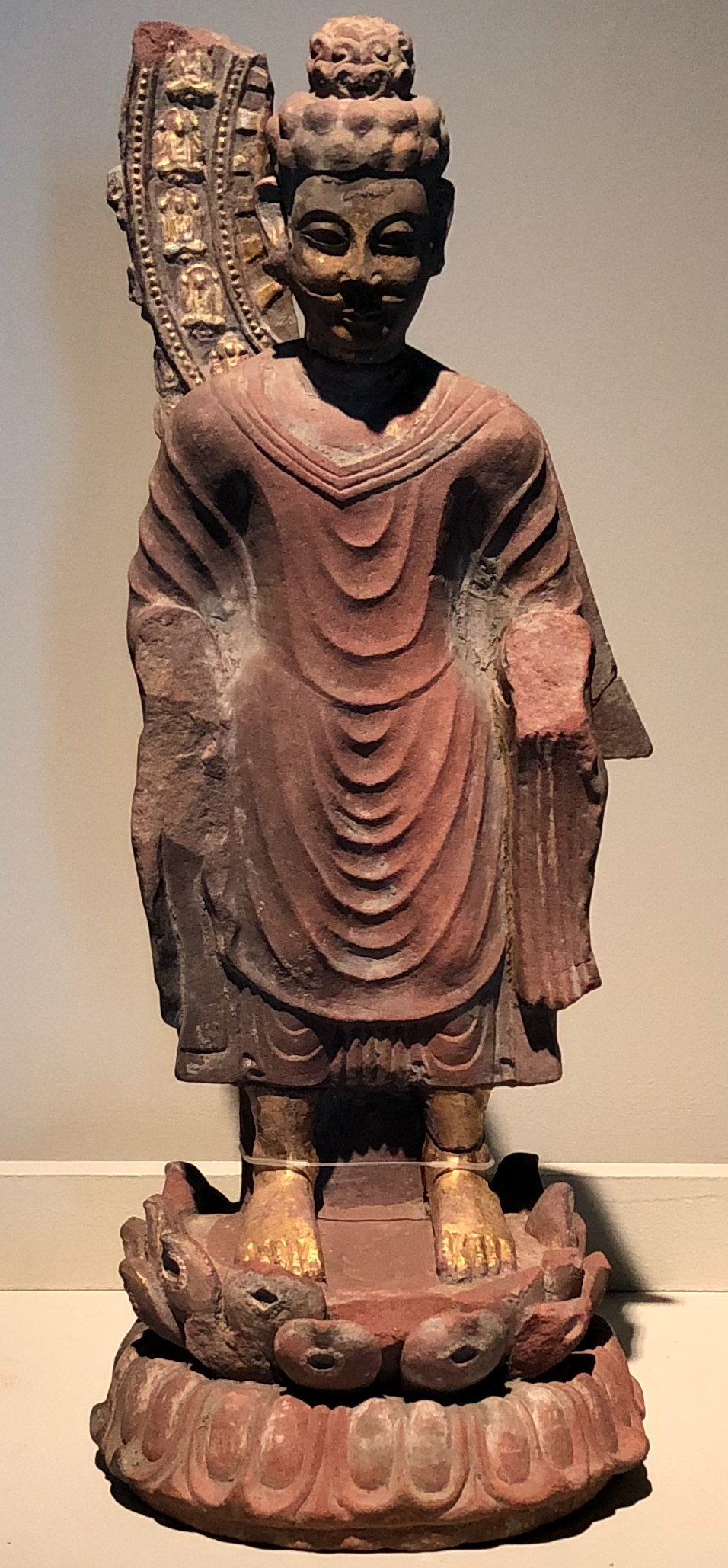
"Ashoka-type Buddha", 551 AD. An early example of Sichuanese Buddhist art with heavy Indian influence.

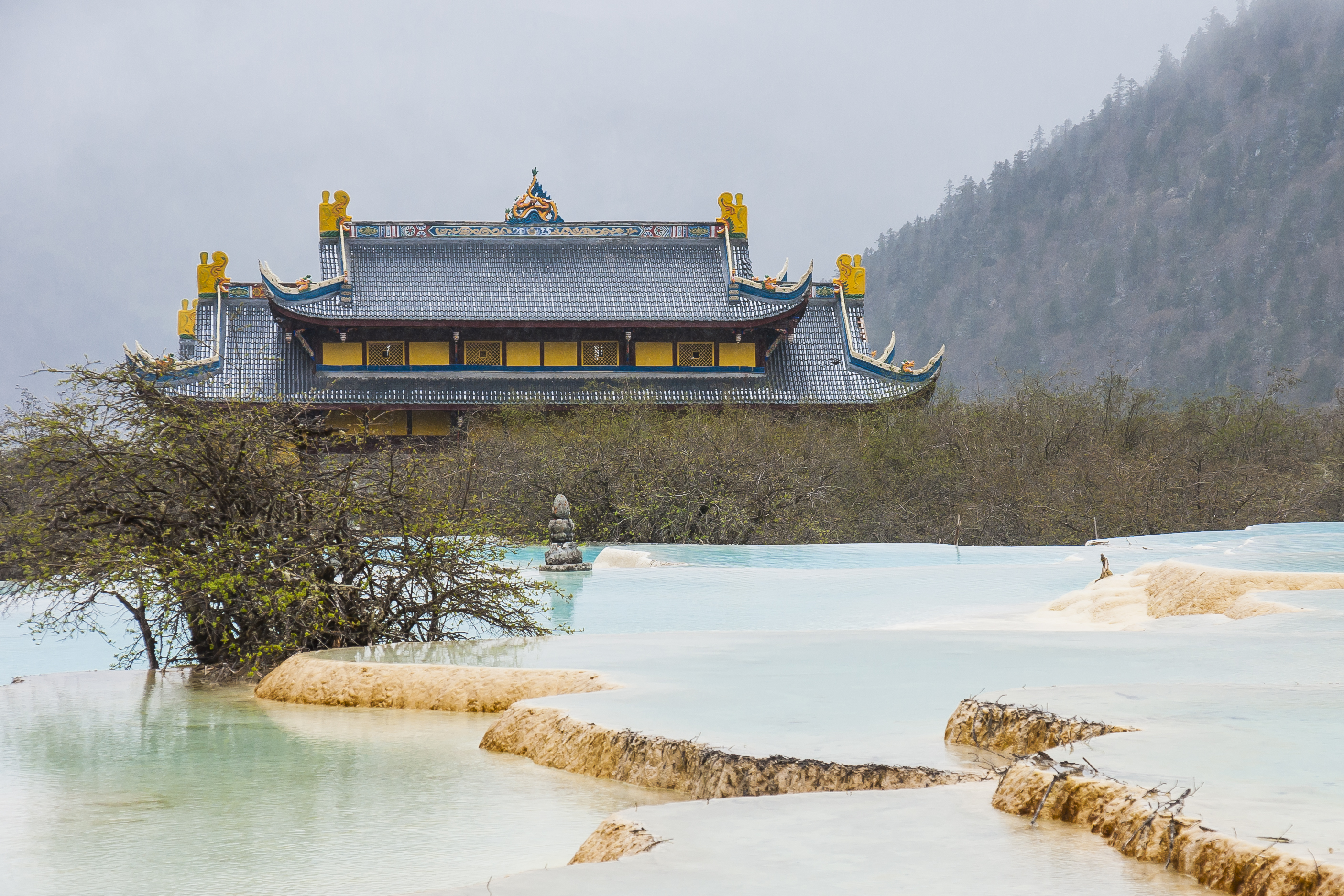
View of the Temple of the Yellow Dragon (Chinese Buddhism) in Huanglong.

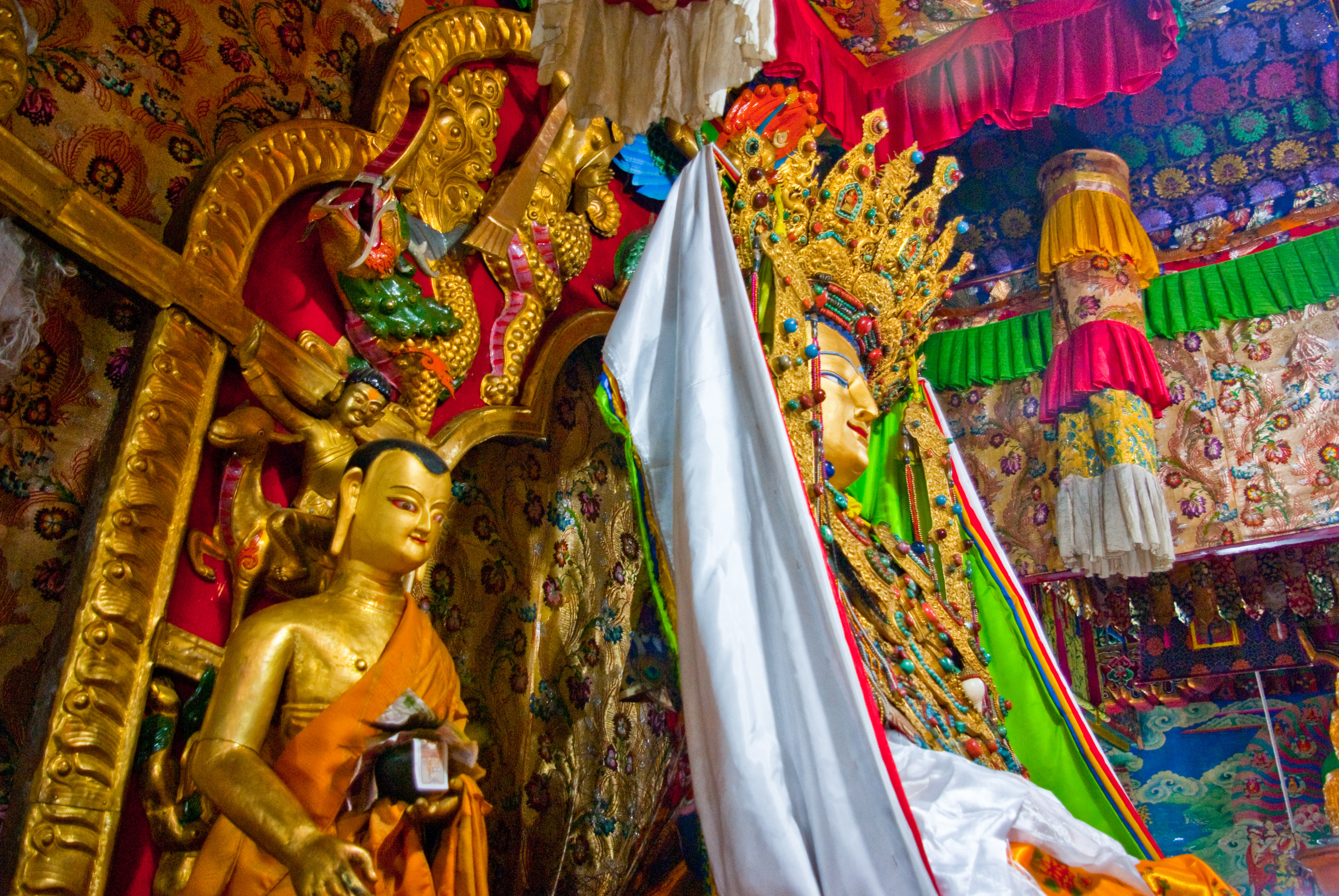
Statues of buddhas at Litang Monastery of the Tibetan tradition.

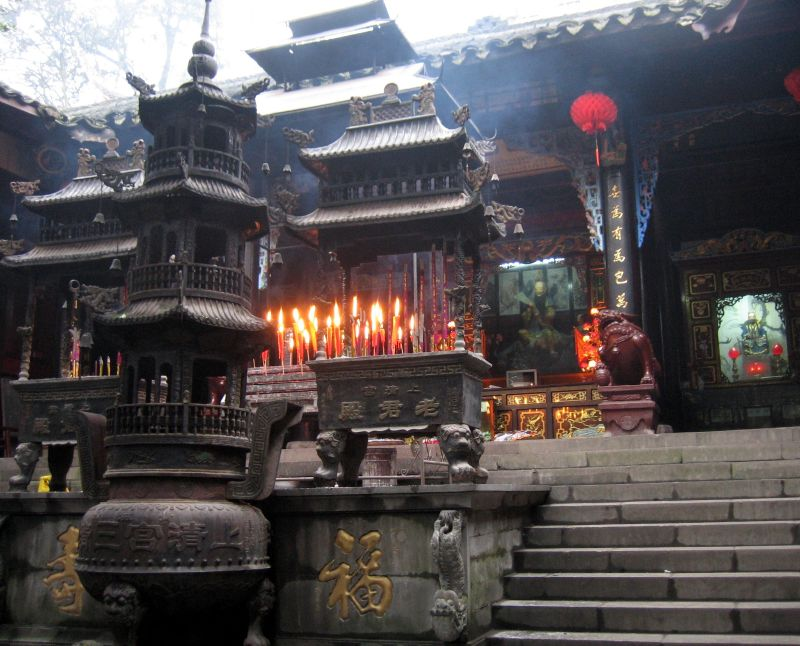
A pavilion of the Shangqing Temple (Taoist) in Qingchengshan, Chengdu.

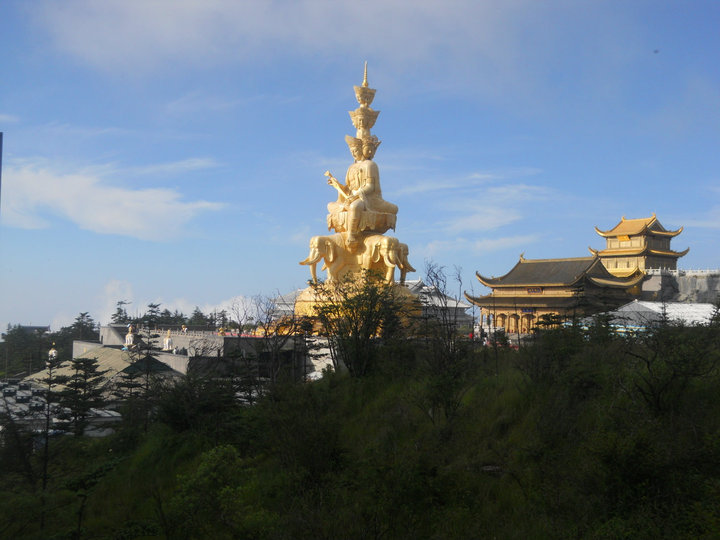
Golden Temple of Mount Emei (Chinese Buddhism).

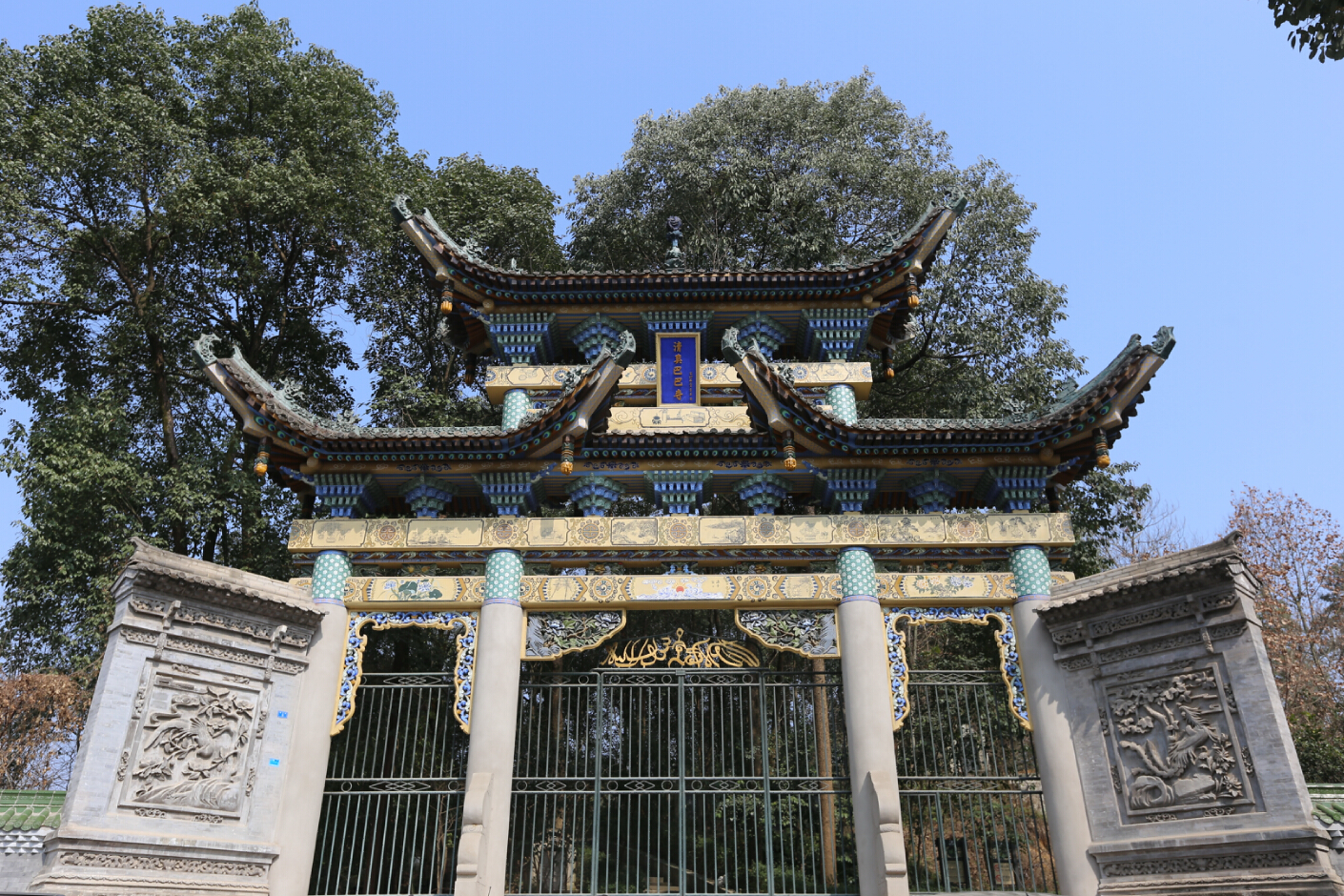
Baba Mosque, a Chinese Sufi mosque in Langzhong.

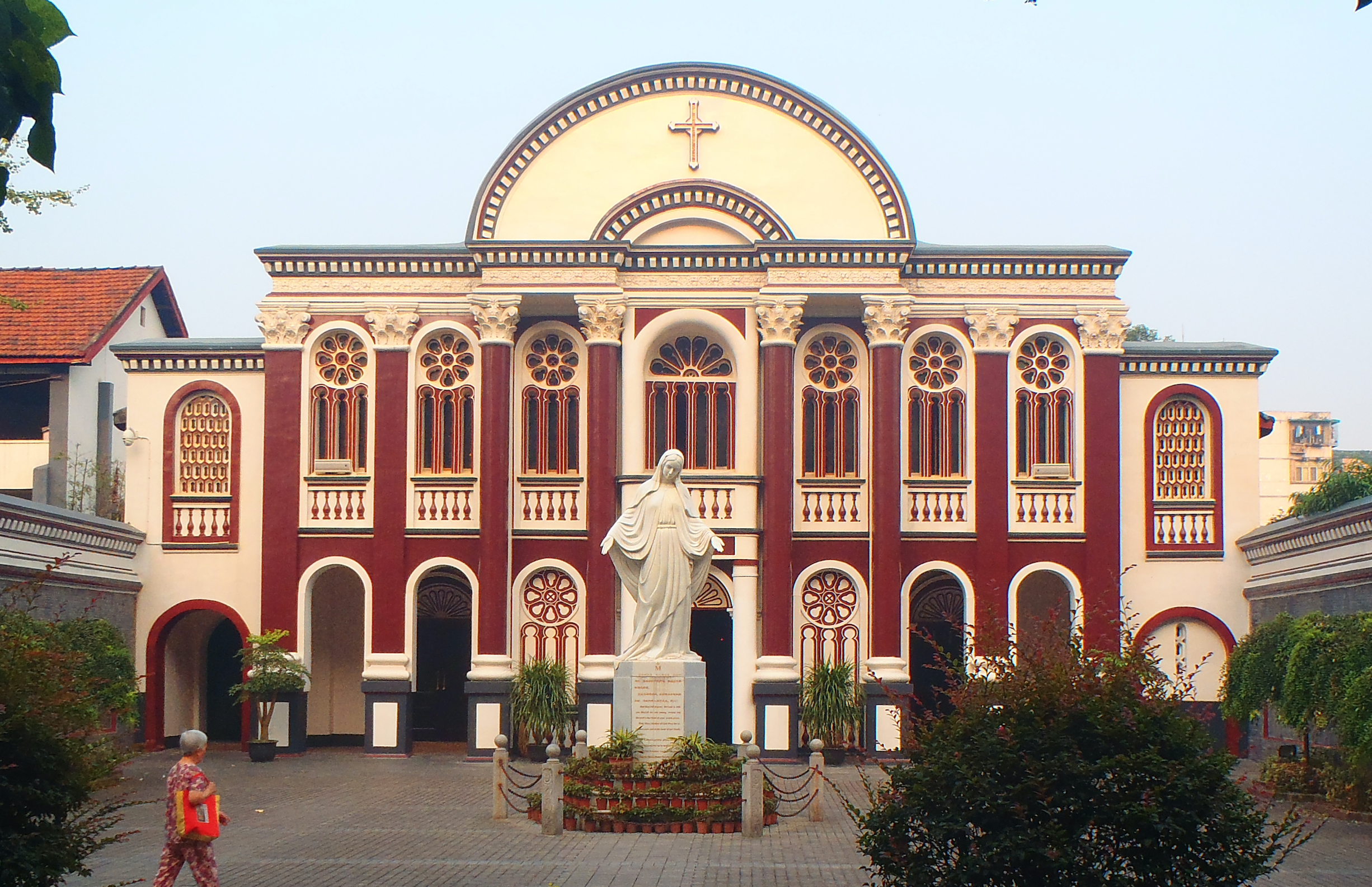
Immaculate Conception Cathedral, Chengdu (Catholic)

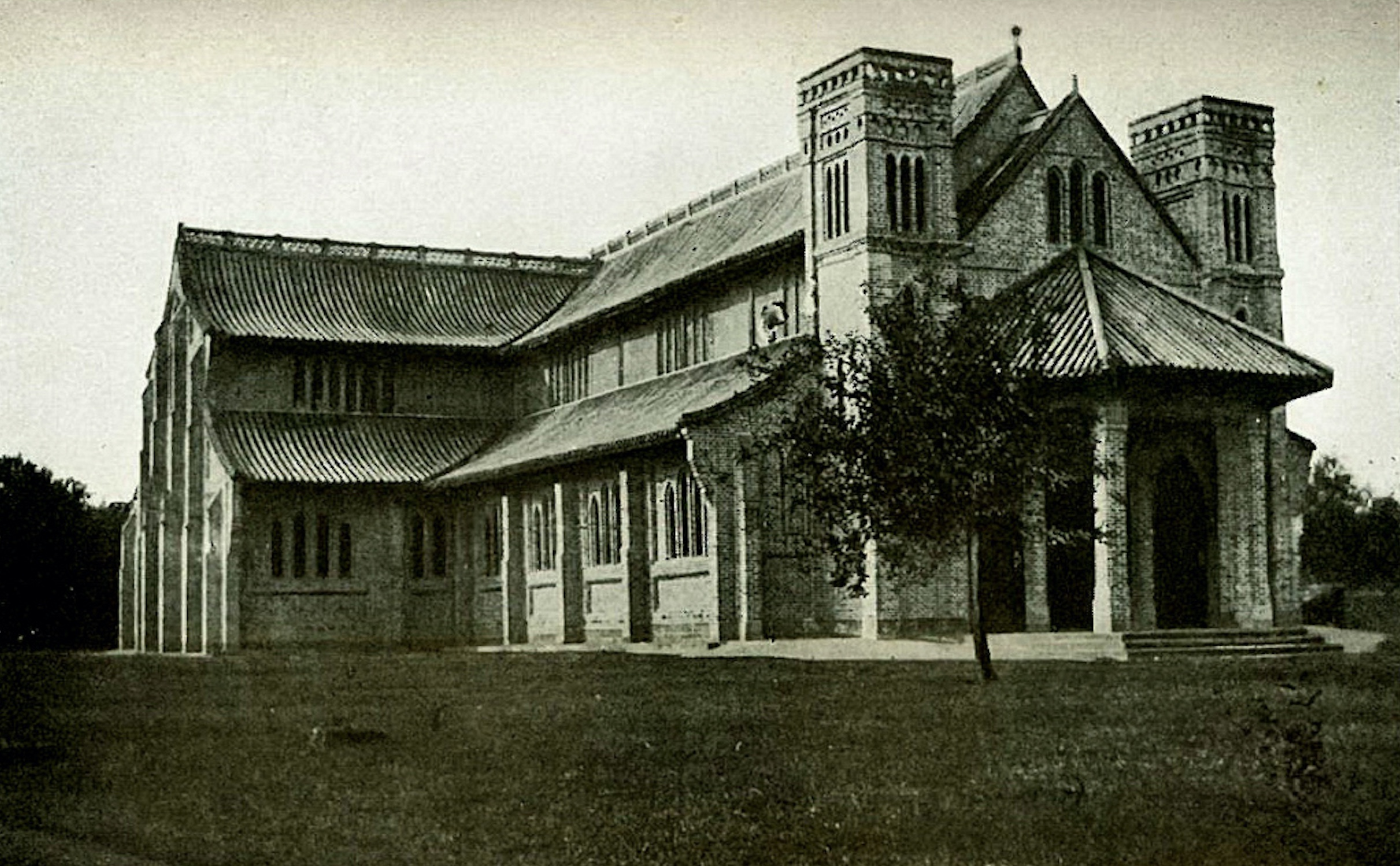
St John's Cathedral, Langzhong (Anglican)

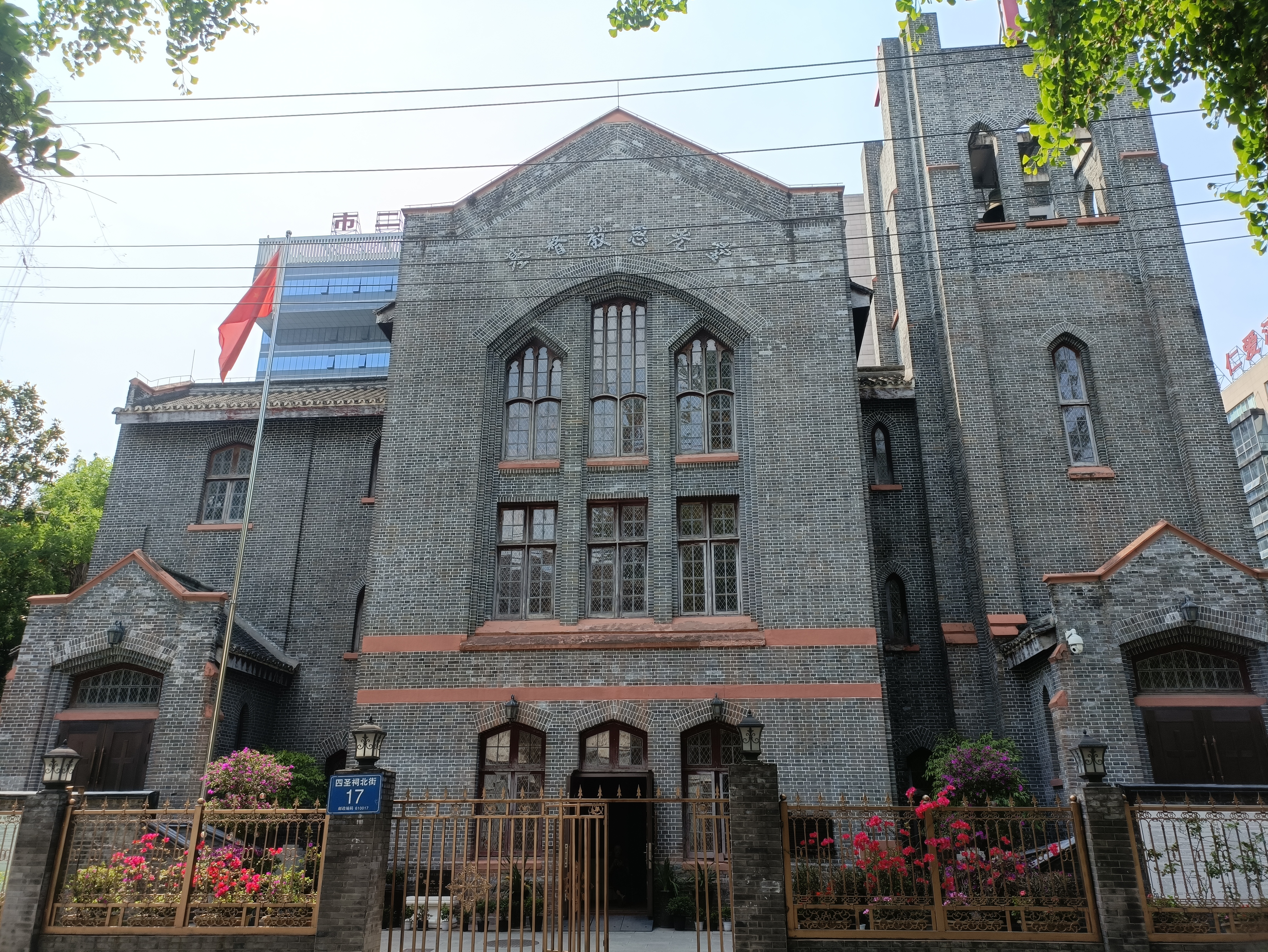
Sï-Shen-Tsï Methodist Church (Methodist)

== Culture ==
The Sichuanese people (Sichuanese: 巴蜀人 Ba^{1}su^{2}ren^{2}; IPA: [pa˥su˨˩zən˨˩]; alternatively 川人, 川渝人, 四川人 or 巴蜀民系) are a subgroup of Han Chinese living in mostly Sichuan province and the neighboring Chongqing municipality. Beginning from the 9th century BC, Shu (on the Chengdu Plain) and Ba (which had its first capital at Enshi City in Hubei and controlled part of the Han Valley) emerged as cultural and administrative centers where two rival kingdoms were established. Although eventually, the Qin dynasty destroyed the kingdoms of Shu and Ba, the Qin government accelerated the technological and agricultural advancements of Sichuan making it comparable to that of the Yellow River Valley. The now-extinct Ba–Shu language was derived from Qin-era settlers and represents the earliest documented division from what is now called Middle Chinese.

During the Yuan and Ming dynasties, the population of the area was reduced through wars and the bubonic plague, and settlers arrived from the area of modern Hubei, replacing the earlier common Chinese with a new standard.

The Li Bai Memorial, located in Jiangyou, is a museum in memory of Li Bai, a Chinese poet of Tang China (618–907) built at the place where he grew up. The building was begun in 1962 on the occasion of the 1200th anniversary of his death, completed in 1981, and opened to the public in October 1982. The memorial is built in the style of the classic Tang garden.

In 2003, Sichuan had "88 art performing troupes, 185 culture centers, 133 libraries, and 52 museums". Companies based in Sichuan also produced 23 television series and one film.

=== Languages ===
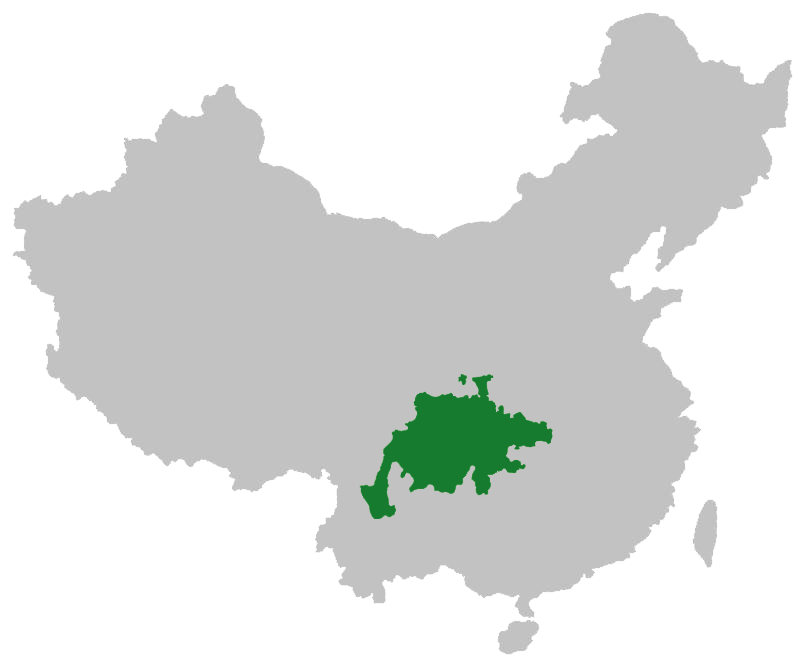
Extent of present-day Sichuanese language

The Sichuanese once spoke their variety of Spoken Chinese called Ba-Shu Chinese, or Old Sichuanese before it became extinct during the Ming dynasty. Now most of them speak Sichuanese Mandarin. The Minjiang dialects are thought by some linguists to be a bona fide descendant of Old Sichuanese, but there is no conclusive evidence whether Minjiang dialects are derived from Old Sichuanese or Southwestern Mandarin.

The languages of Sichuan are primarily members of three subfamilies of the Sino-Tibetan languages.

The most widely used variety of Chinese spoken in Sichuan is Sichuanese, which is the lingua franca in Sichuan, Chongqing, and parts of the Tibet Autonomous Region. Although Sichuanese is generally classified as a dialect of Mandarin Chinese, it is highly divergent in phonology, vocabulary, and even grammar from Standard Chinese. The Minjiang dialect is especially difficult for speakers of other Mandarin dialects to understand.

Garzê Tibetan Autonomous Prefecture and Ngawa Tibetan and Qiang Autonomous Prefecture in western Sichuan are populated by Tibetans and Qiang people. Tibetans speak the Khams and Amdo Tibetan, which are Tibetic languages, as well as various Qiangic languages. The Qiang speak Qiangic languages and often Tibetic languages as well. The Yi people of Liangshan Yi Autonomous Prefecture in southern Sichuan speak the Nuosu language, which is one of the Lolo-Burmese languages; Yi is written using the Yi script, a syllabary standardized in 1974. The Southwest University for Nationalities has one of China's most prominent Tibetology departments and the Southwest Minorities Publishing House prints literature in minority languages. In the minority-inhabited regions of Sichuan, there is bilingual signage and public school instruction in non-Mandarin minority languages.

=== Sichuan brocade ===
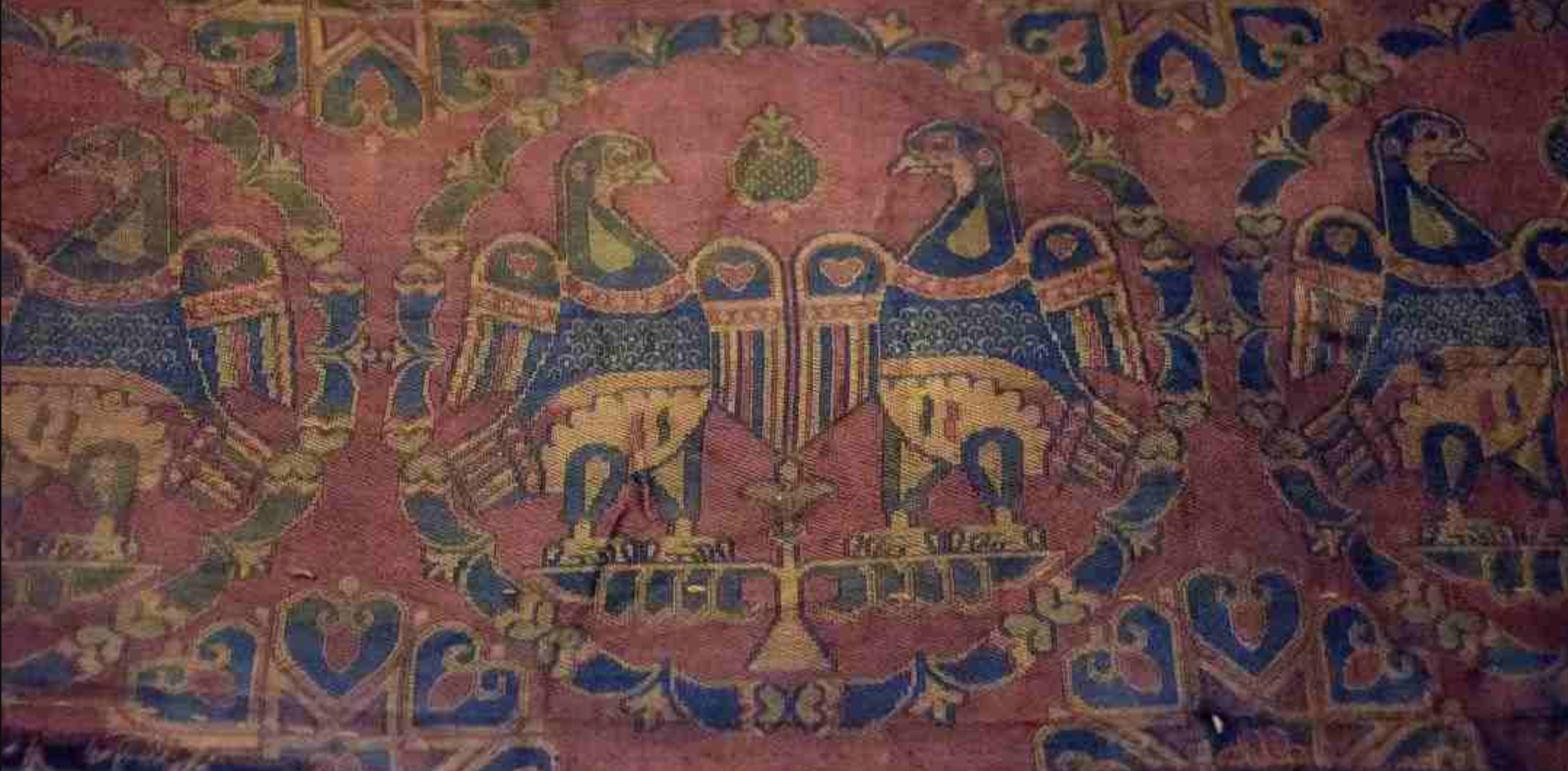
Sichuan brocade manufactured between the 7th and early 10th century, featuring double bird in floral roundel pattern; collection of Chengdu Museum.

Commonly known as "Shu brocade" (蜀錦) in Chinese, Sichuan brocade is referred to as the "mother of brocade in China" given its age. This technique of embroidery originates in the capital city of Chengdu during the time of the Ancient Kingdom of Shu. It enjoyed high popularity throughout the regions along the Silk Road, which stimulated an "exoticization" of the embroidery designs during the 1st millennium, with most of the patterns imported from Sogdia and other parts of Central Asia.

According to the Book of Sui, in the year 605 AD, the head of the Sichuan ateliers producing silks in the "western style" was a certain He Chou, a name which betrays his Sogdian origins. Most of the silk products unearthed in Xinjiang (Chinese Turkestan) and Qinghai (Tuyuhun Kingdom) confirmed to be manufactured in Sichuan.

=== Cuisine ===
Sichuan is known for its spicy cuisine and use of Sichuan peppers due to its humid climate.

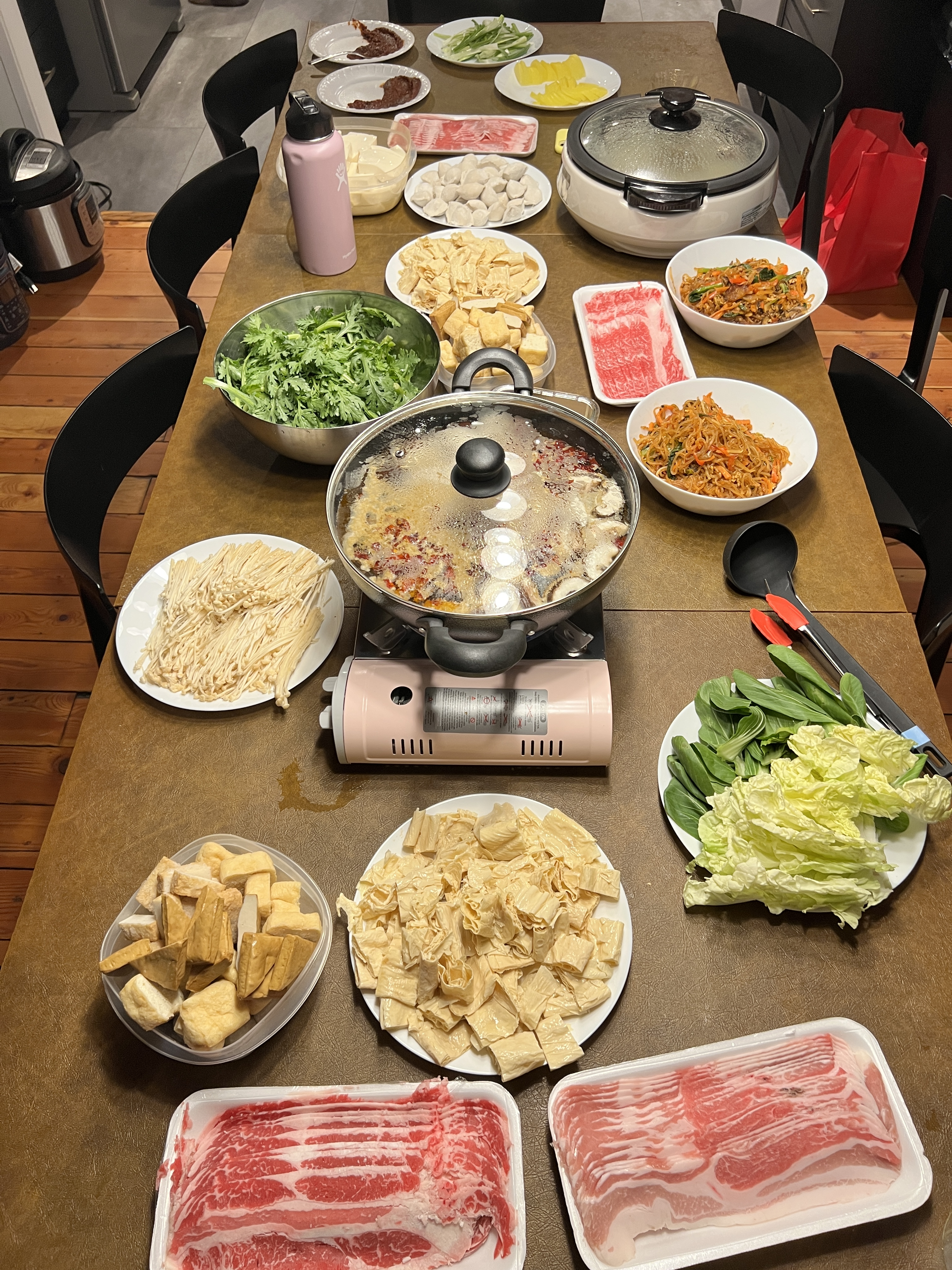
Hotpot

Another famous Sichuan delicacy is hot pot. Hot pot is a Chinese soup containing a variety of East Asian foodstuffs and ingredients, prepared with a simmering pot of soup stock at the dining table. While the hot pot is kept simmering, ingredients are placed into the pot and cooked at the table. Typical hot pot dishes include thinly sliced meat, leaf vegetables, mushrooms, wontons, egg dumplings, tofu, and seafood. The cooked food is usually eaten with a dipping sauce.

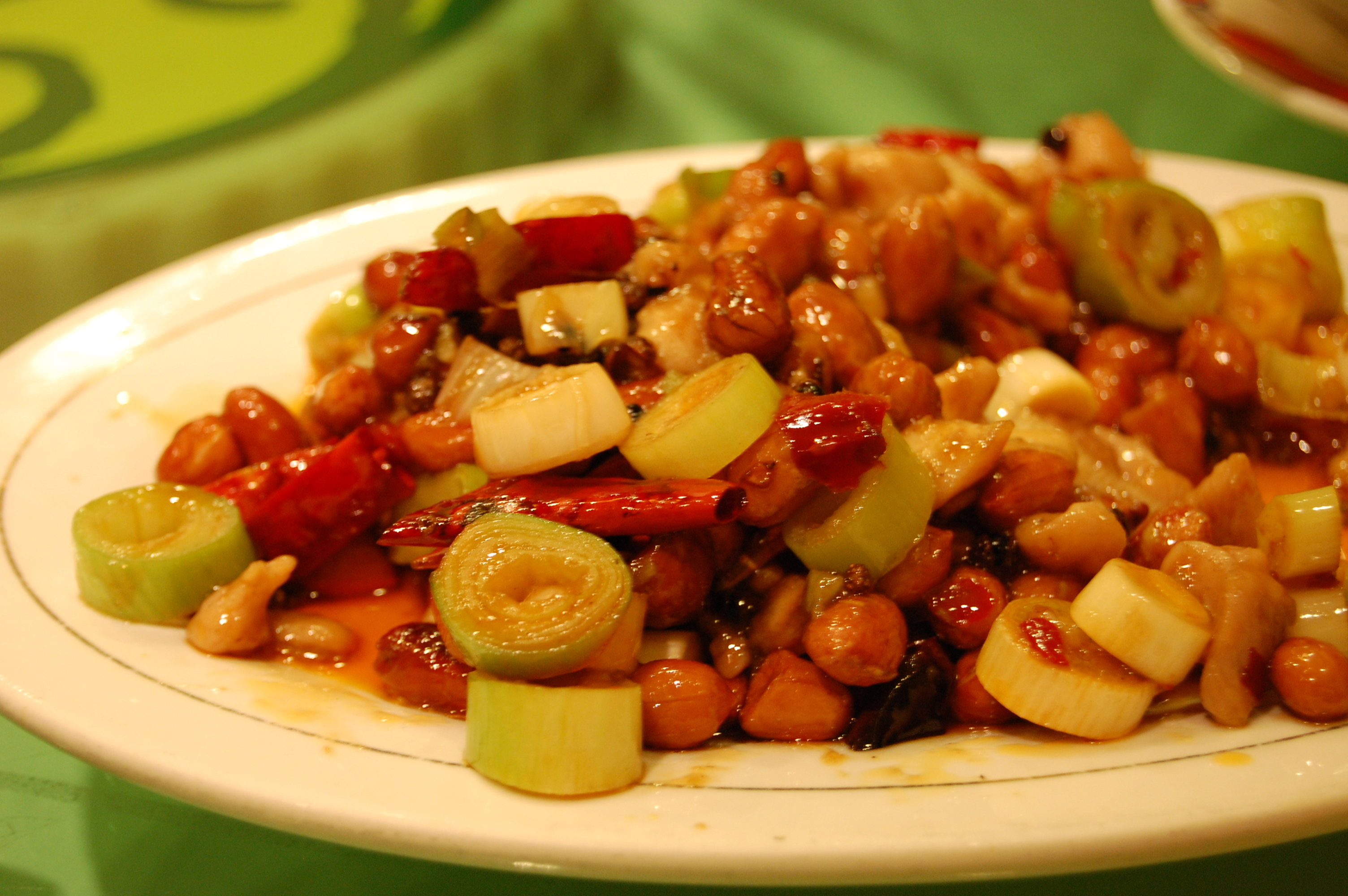
Kung Pao chicken, one of the best known dishes of Sichuan cuisine

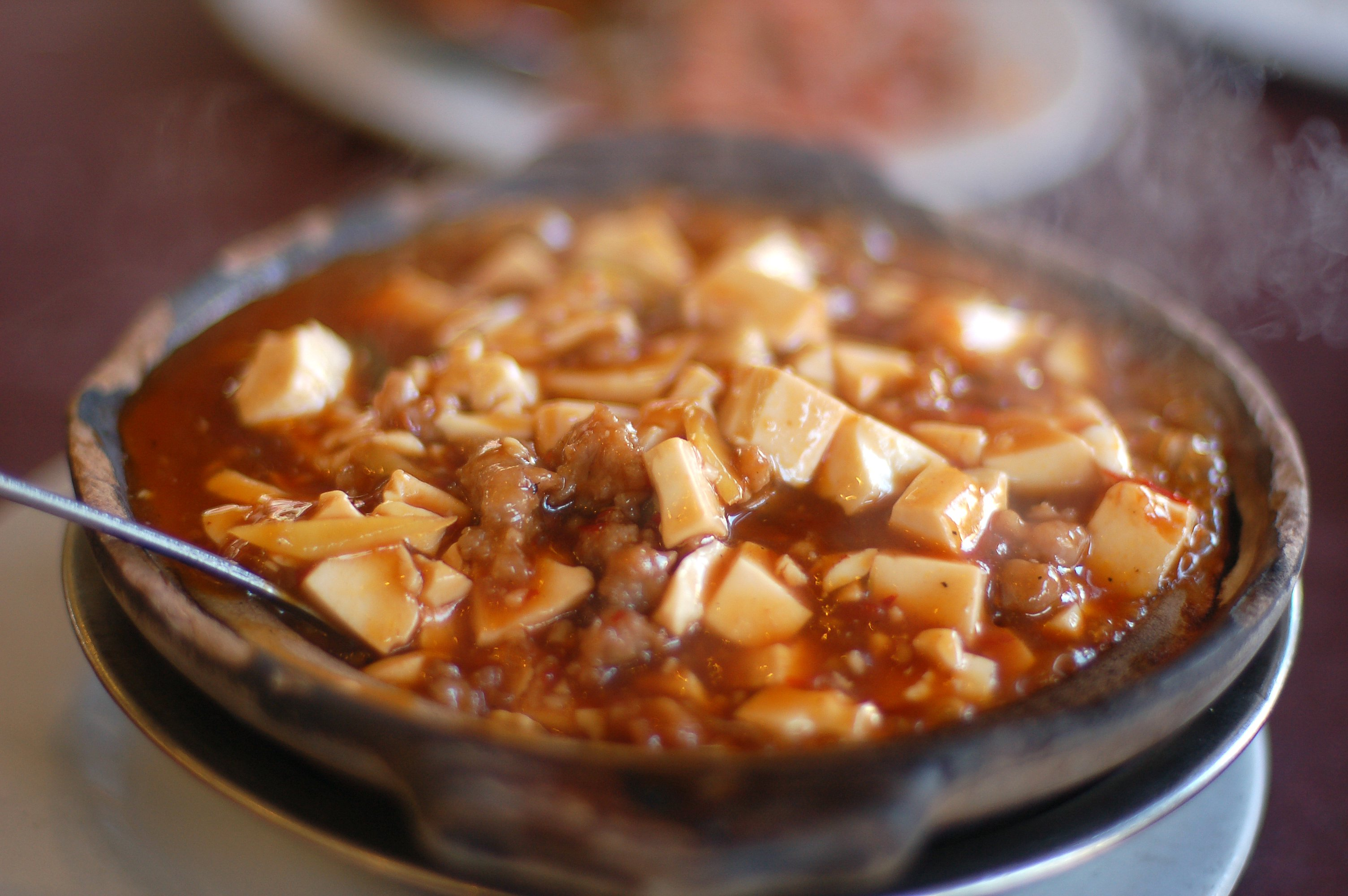
Mapo doufu

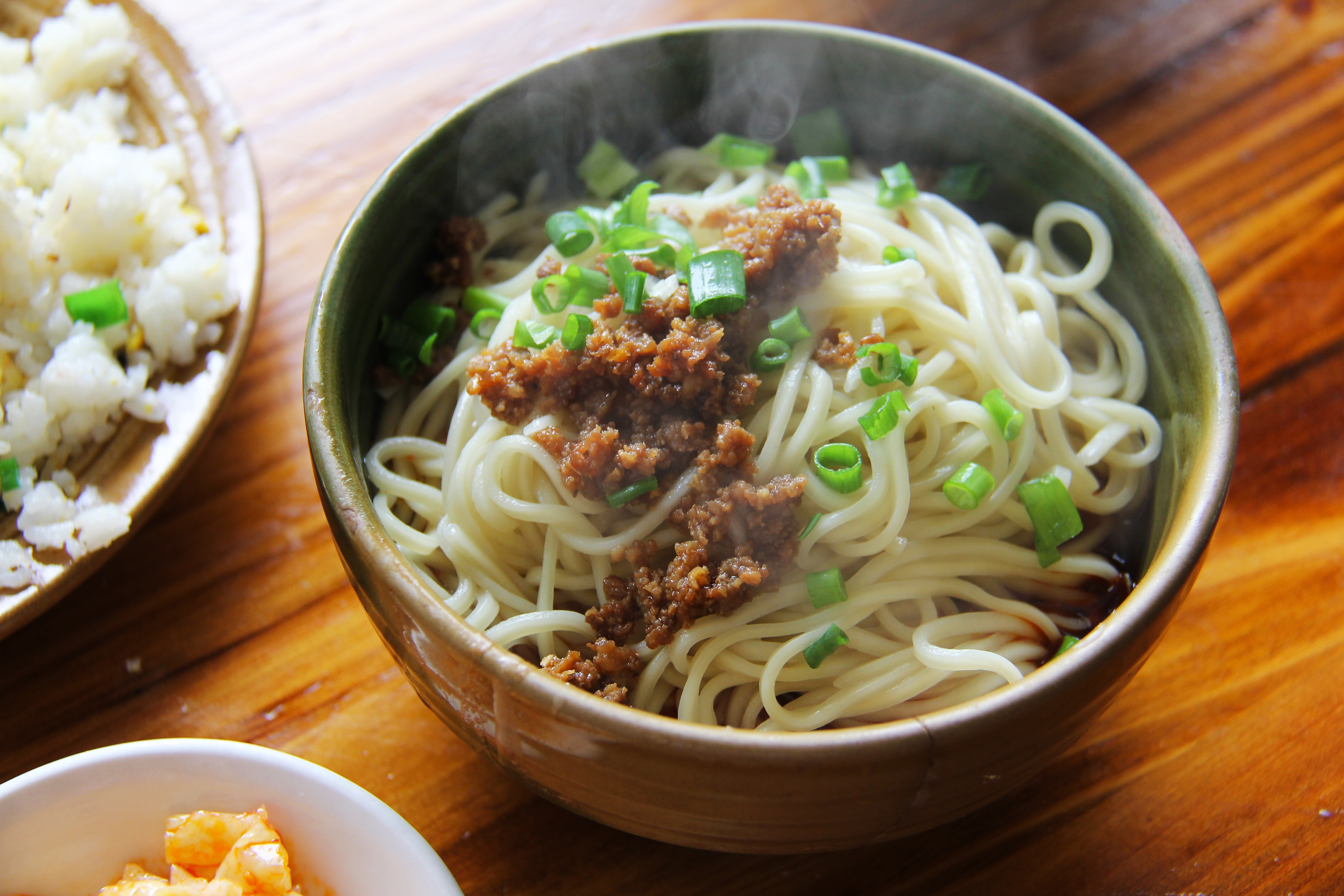
Dandan noodles

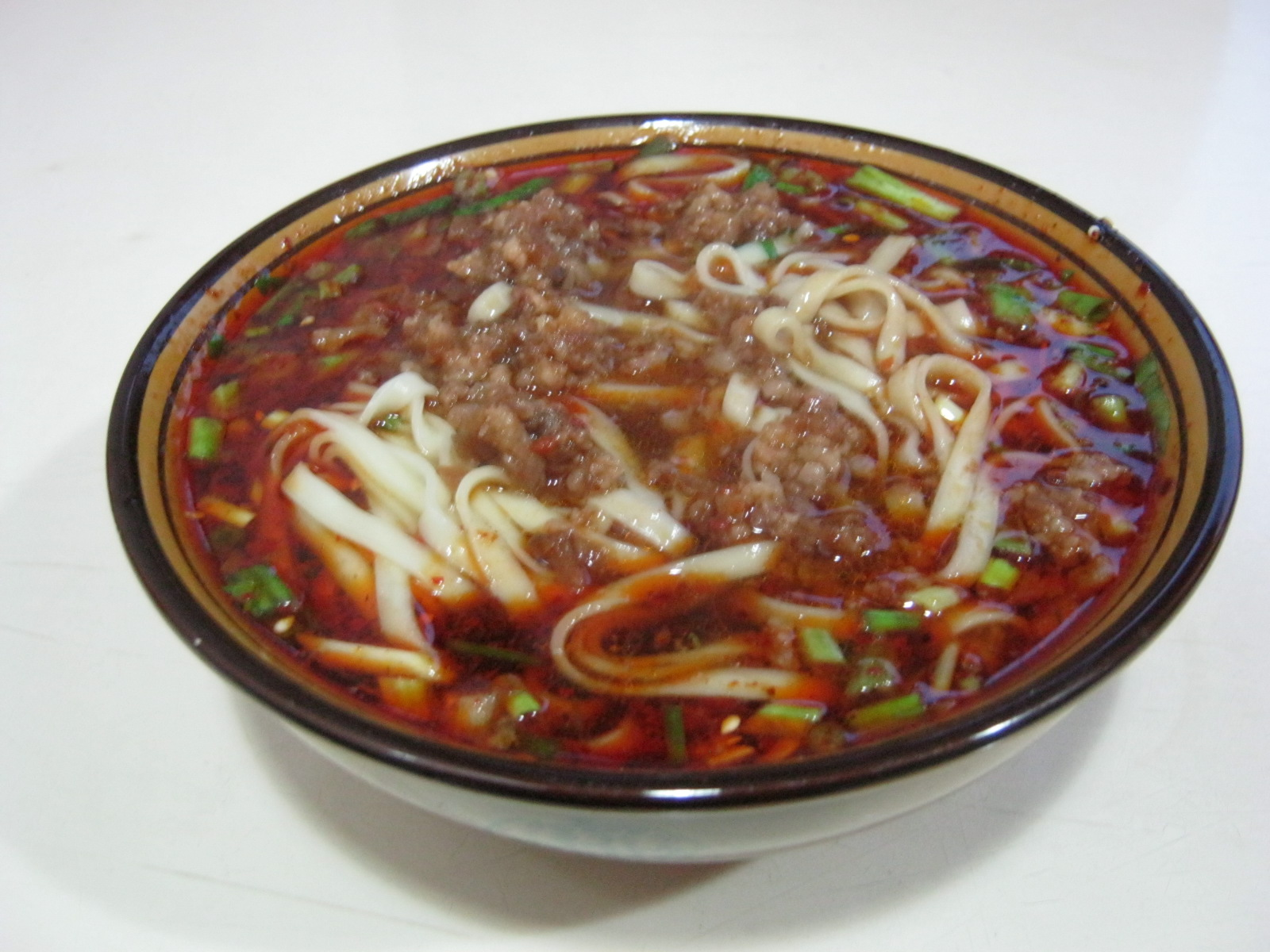
Zajiangmian (杂酱面)

== Education ==
=== Colleges and universities ===
As of 2022, Sichuan hosts 134 institutions of higher education, ranking first in the Western China region and fifth among all Chinese provinces after Jiangsu, Guangdong, Henan and Shandong.

- Sichuan University (Chengdu)
- Southwest Jiaotong University (Chengdu)
- University of Electronic Science and Technology of China (Chengdu)
- Southwestern University of Finance and Economics (Chengdu)
- Chengdu University of Technology (Chengdu)
- Chengdu University of Information Technology (Chengdu)
- Chengdu University of Traditional Chinese Medicine (Chengdu)
- Civil Aviation Flight University of China (Guanghan)
- Southwest University for Nationalities (Chengdu)
- Sichuan Normal University (Chengdu)
- Sichuan Agricultural University (Ya'an, Chengdu, Dujiangyan)
- Southwest Petroleum University (Nanchong and Chengdu)
- Xihua University (Chengdu)
- Southwest University of Science and Technology (Mianyang)
- China West Normal University (Nanchong)
- North Sichuan Medical College (Nanchong)
- Panzhihua University (Panzhihua)
- Sichuan Police College (Luzhou)
- Sichuan University of Science and Engineering (Zigong and Yibin)
- Chengdu University (Chengdu)
- Xichang University (Xichang)
- Aba Teachers University (Ngawa Tibetan and Qiang Autonomous Prefecture)
- Yibin University (Yibin)

== Tourism ==
UNESCO World Heritage Sites in Sichuan province and Chongqing municipality include:

- Dazu Rock Carvings and Wulong Karst (Chongqing municipality)
- Huanglong Scenic and Historic Interest Area
- Jiuzhaigou Valley Scenic and Historic Interest Area
- Mount Emei Scenic Area, including Leshan Giant Buddha Scenic Area
- Mount Qincheng and the Dujiangyan Irrigation System
- Sichuan Giant Panda Sanctuaries

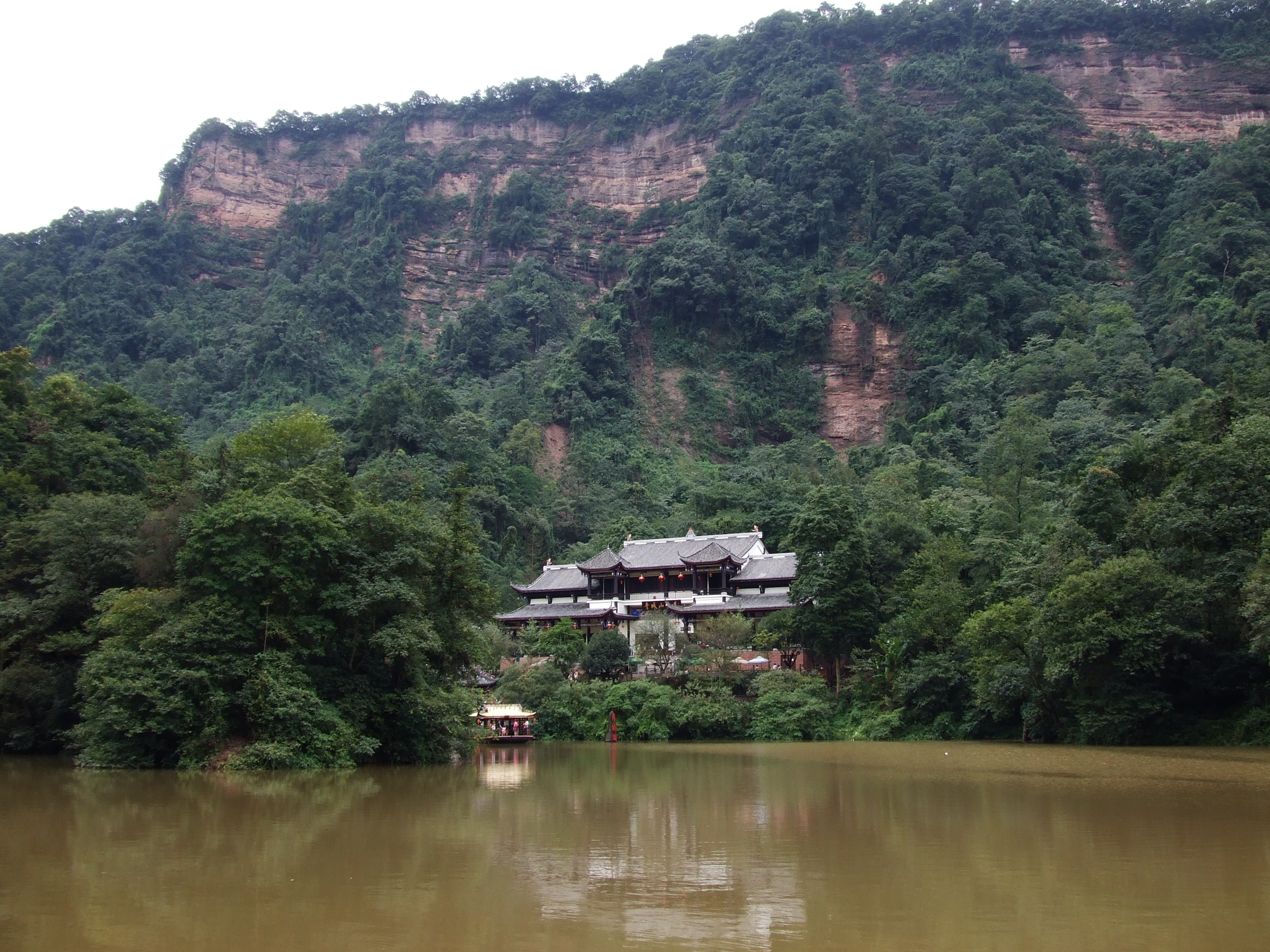
Mount Qingcheng

As of July 2013, the world's largest building, the New Century Global Center is located in Chengdu. At 328 ft (100 m) high, 1,640 ft (500 m) long, and 1,312 ft (400 m) wide, the Center houses retail outlets, movie theaters, offices, hotels, the Paradise Island waterpark, an artificial beach, a 164 yd (150 m)-long LED screen, skating rink, pirate ship, fake Mediterranean village, 24-hour artificial sun, and 15,000-spot parking area.

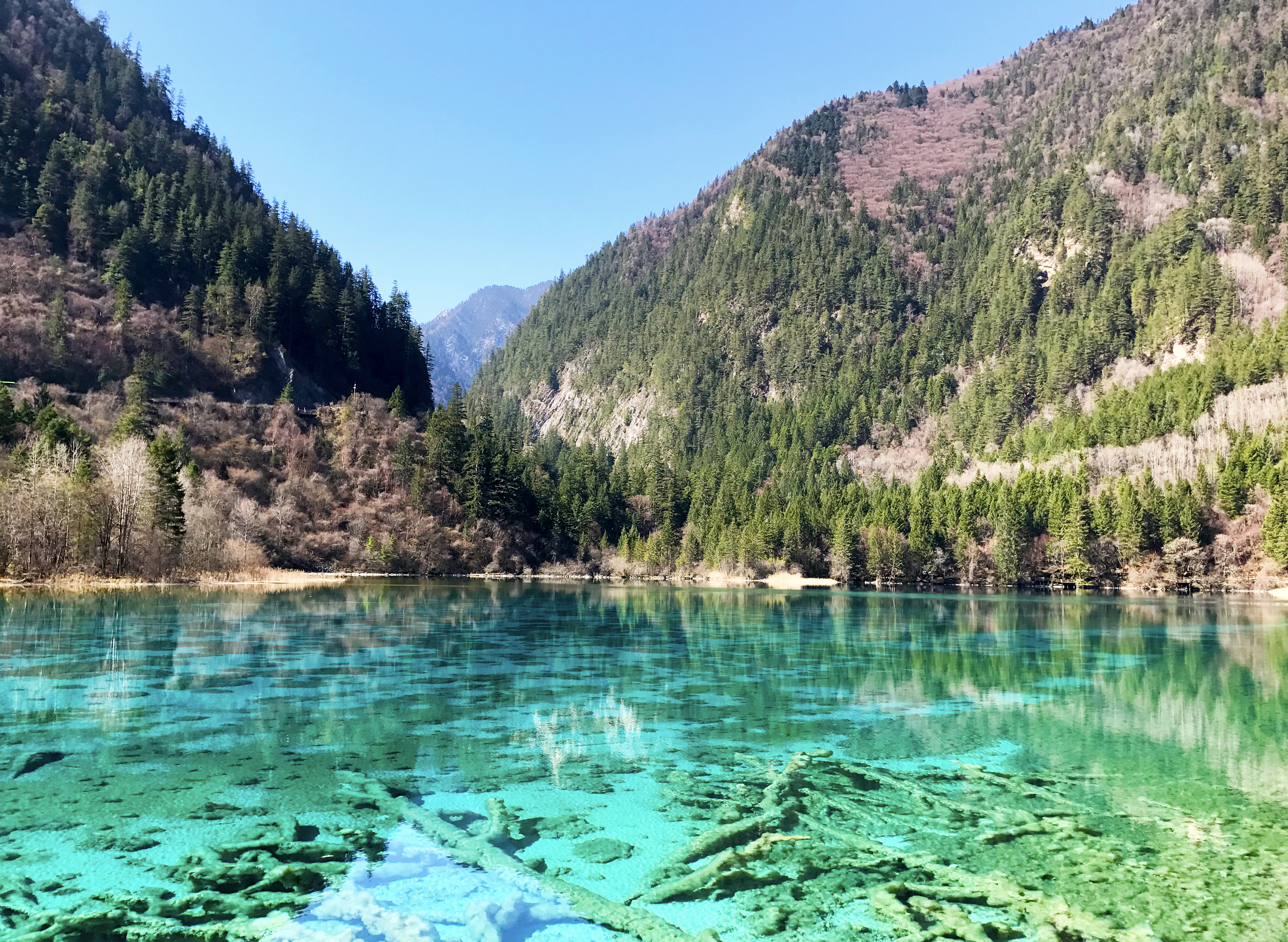
Jiuzhaigou

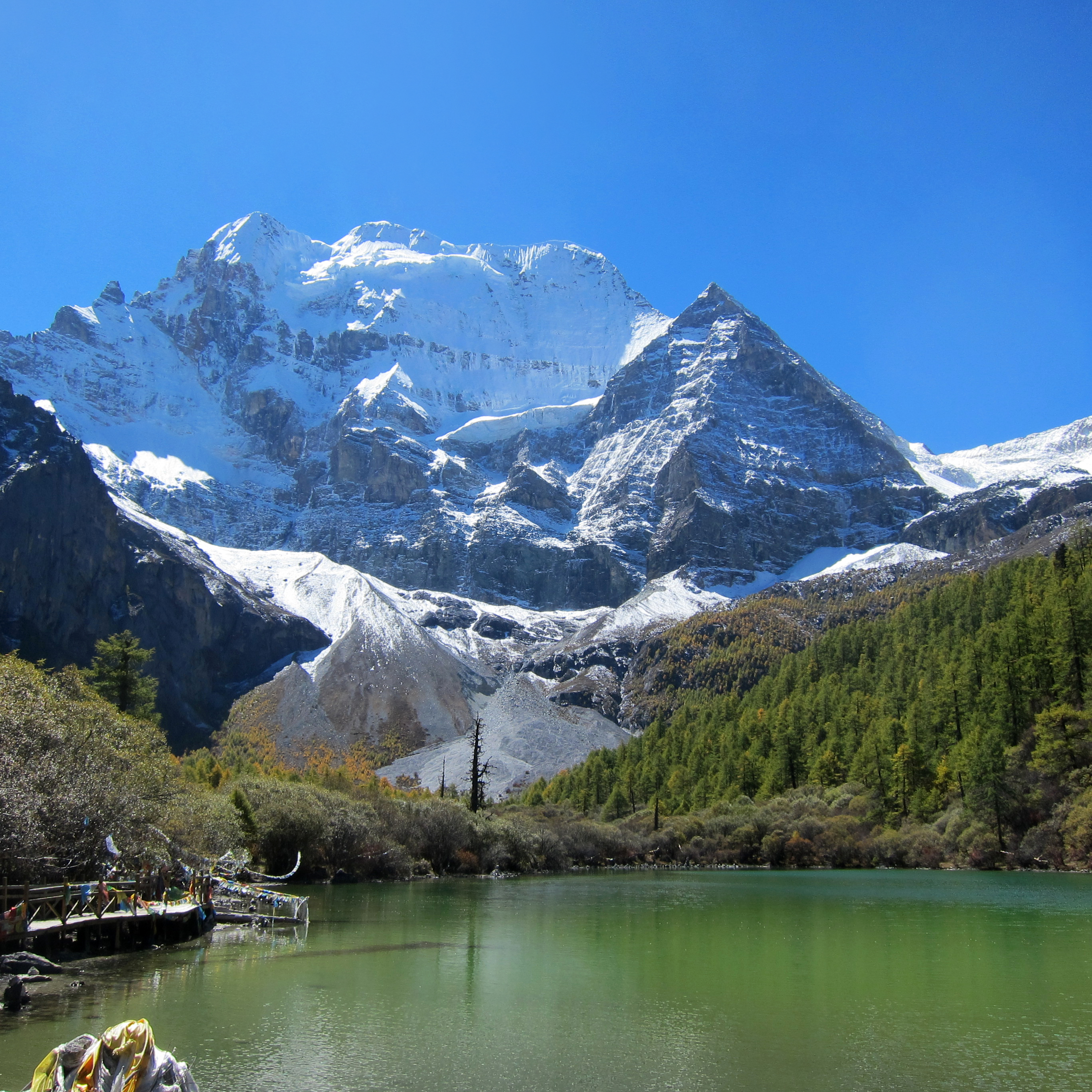
Yading

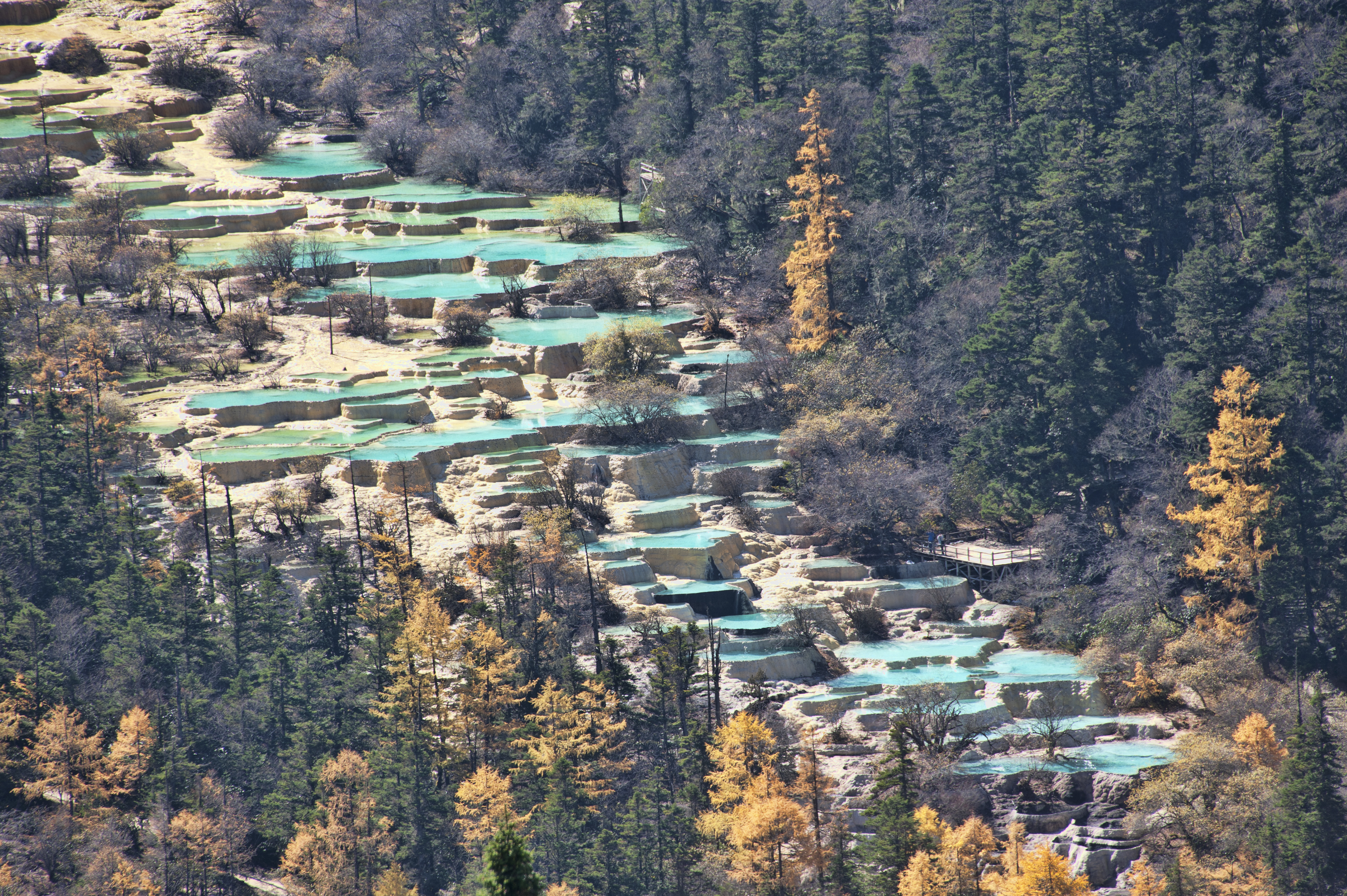
Huanglong Scenic and Historic Interest Area

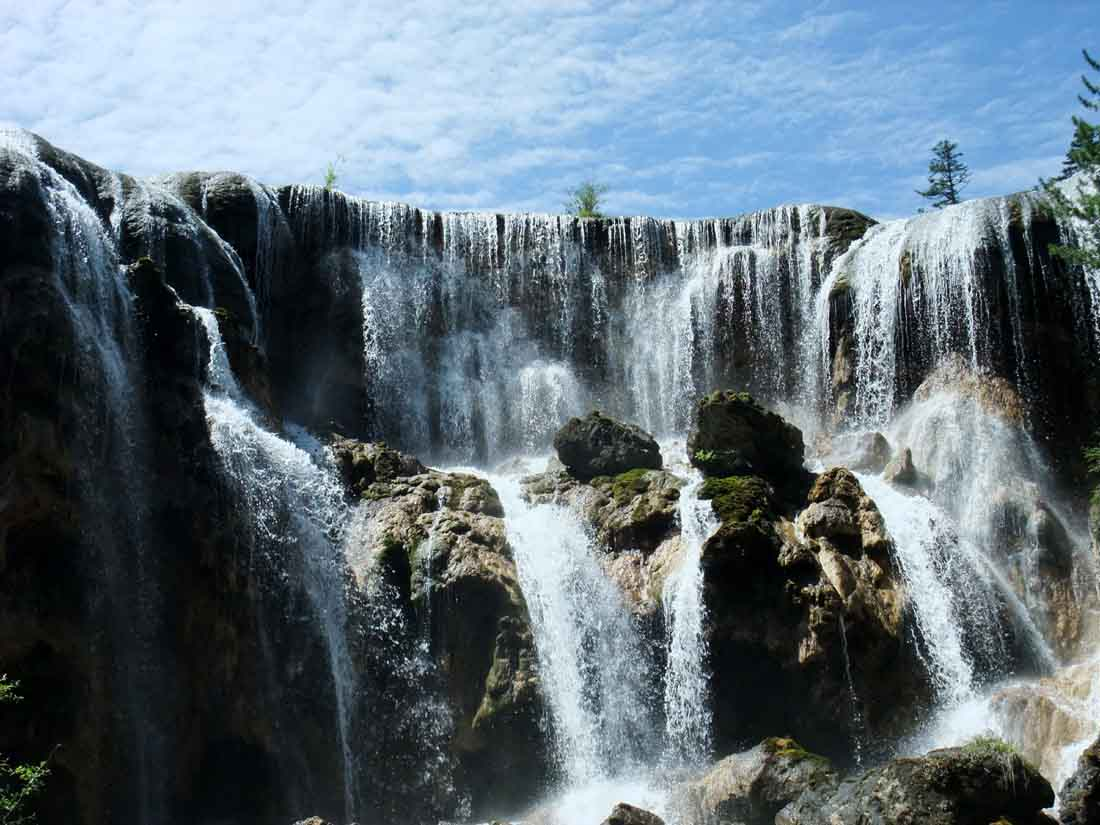
Waterfalls at Jiuzhaigou

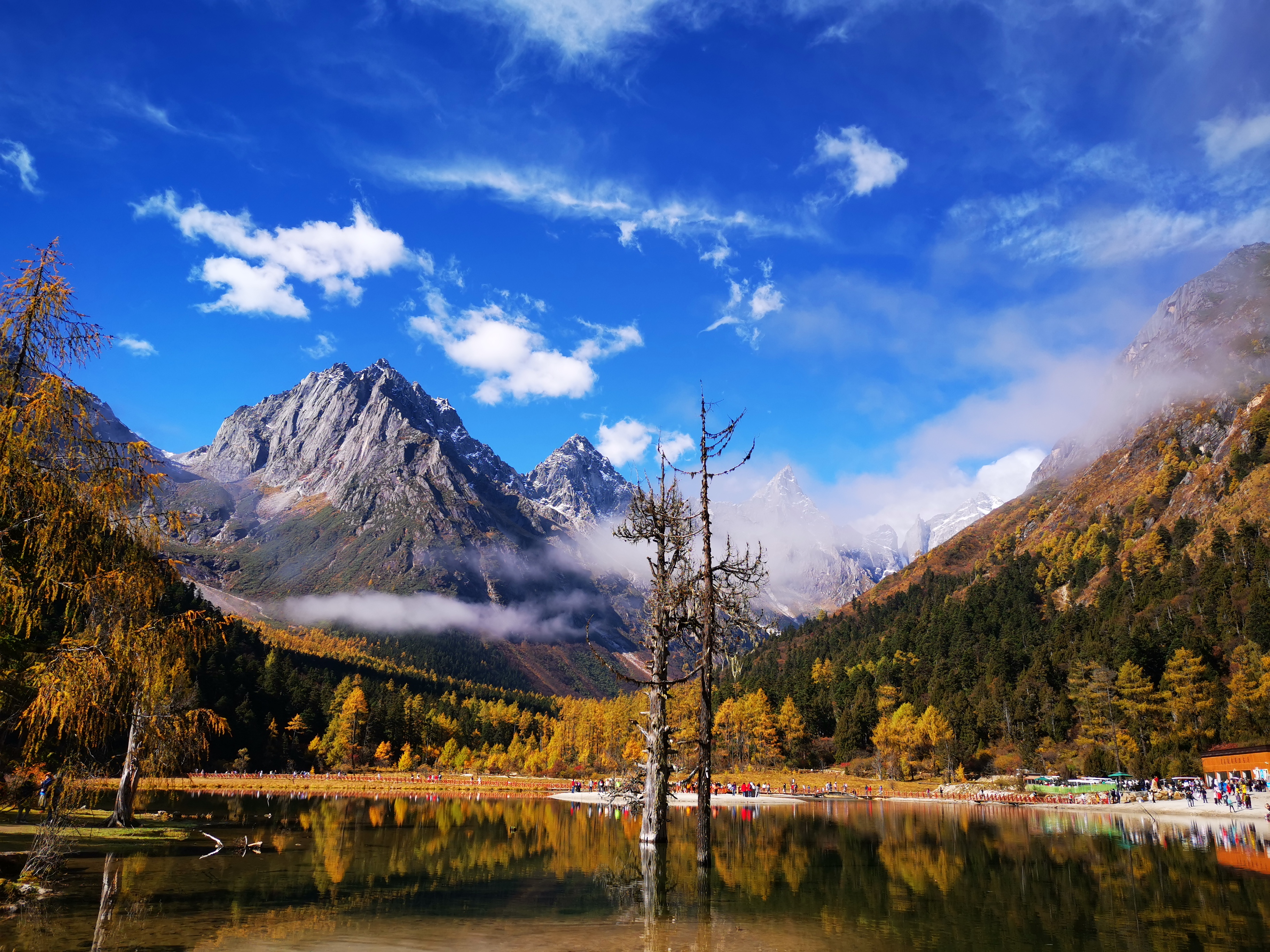
Bipenggou Valley

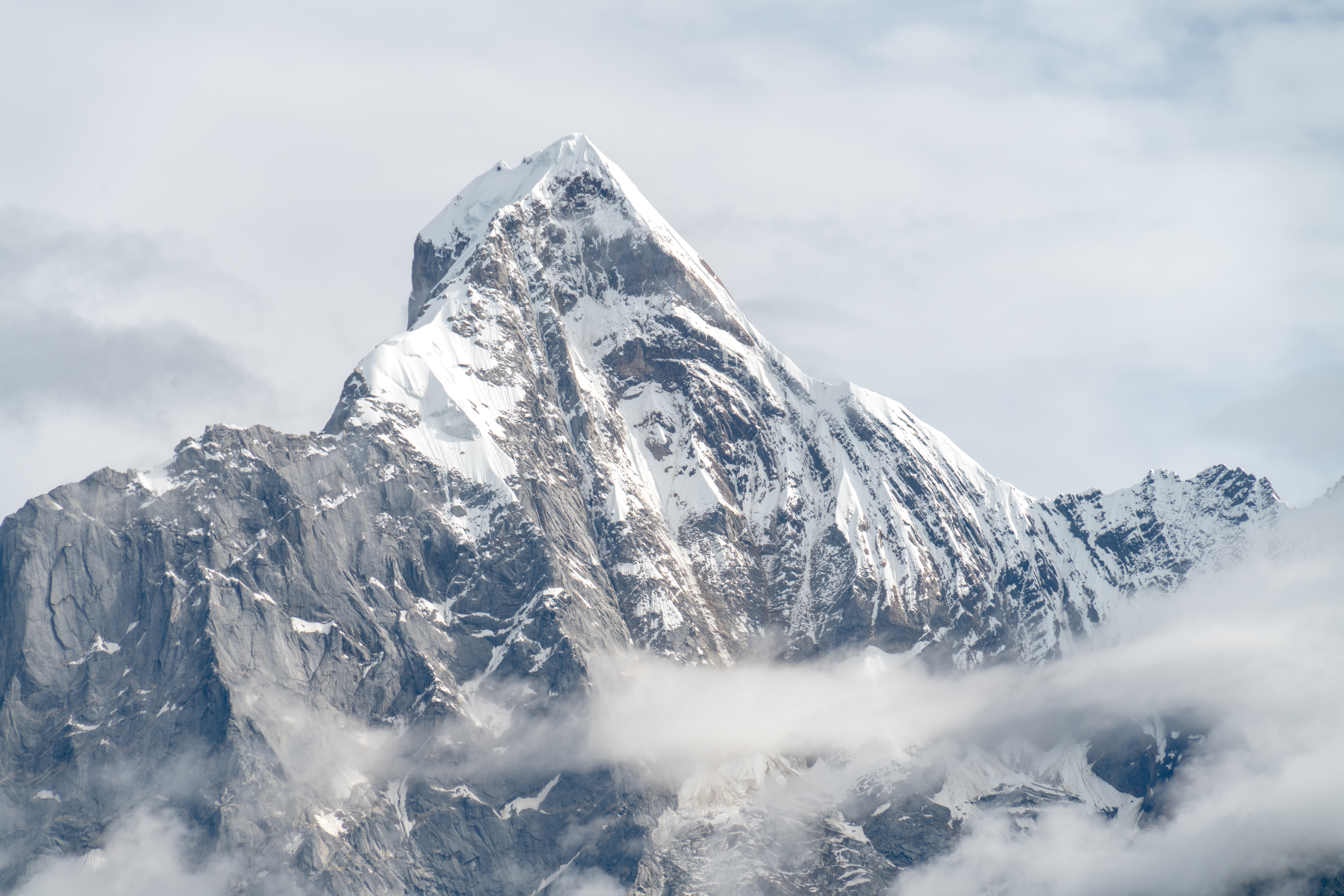
Mount Siguniang Scenic Area

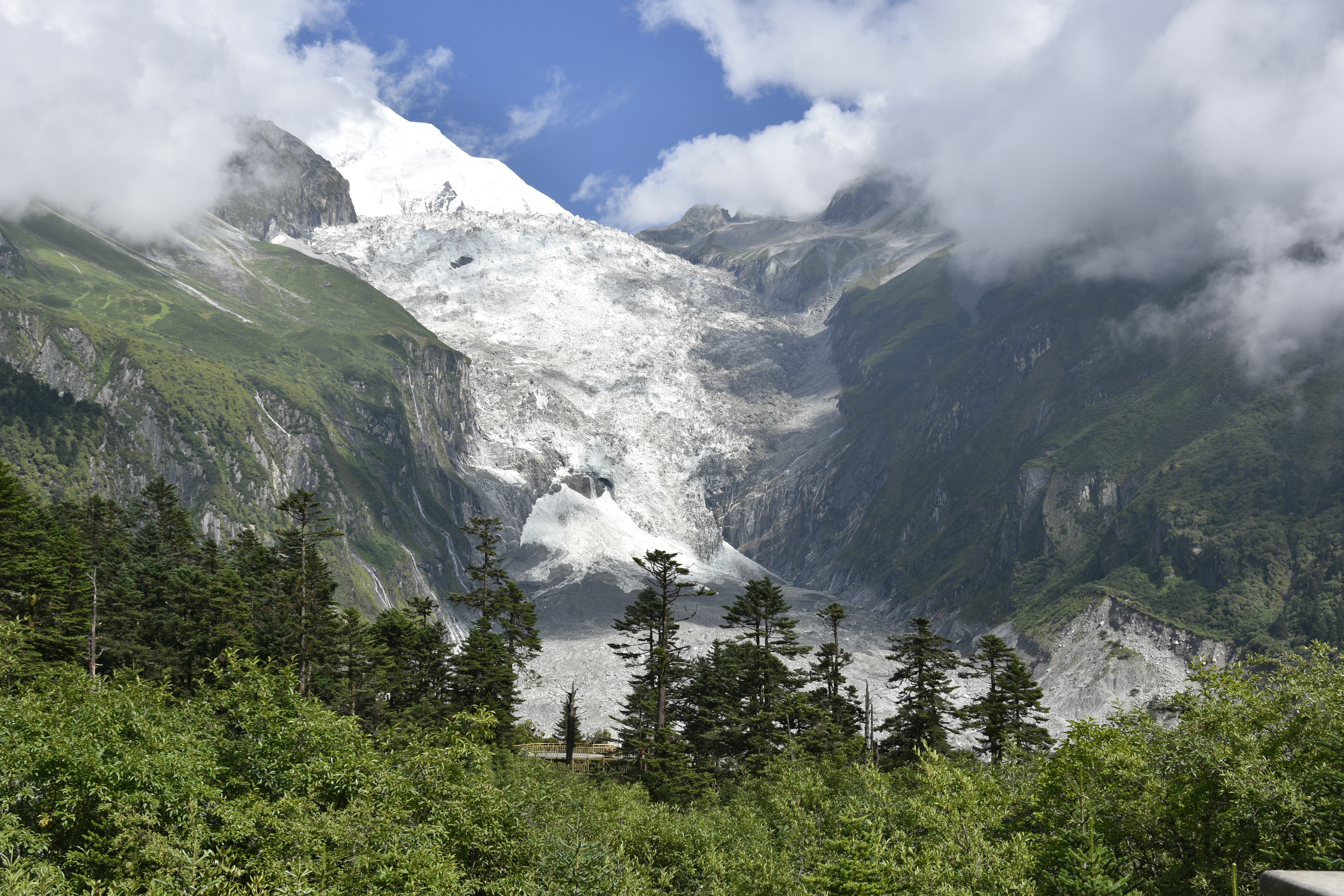
Hailuogou Glacier Forest Park

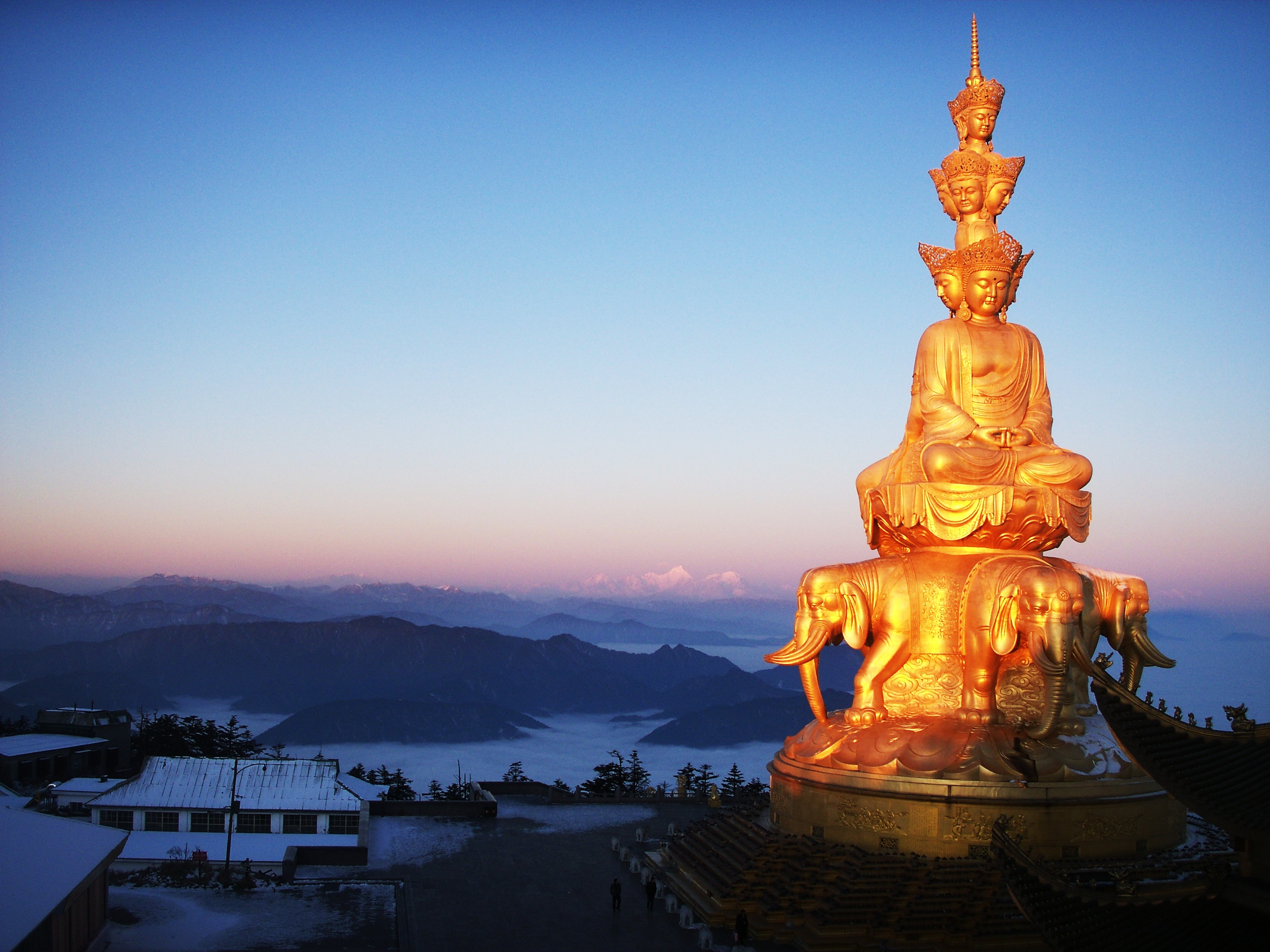
Mount Emei

== Notable individuals ==
- Ba Jin (25 November 1904 – 17 October 2005), novelist and writer
- Bai Ling, actress
- Bao Sanniang, a possibly fictional woman warrior of the Three Kingdoms period.
- Chang Chün, premier of the Republic of China
- Chang Dai-chien, artist
- Che Yongli (28 January 1980), actress
- Chen Kenmin (27 June 1912 – 12 May 1990), chef who specialized in Sichuan cuisine. Father of well-known Iron Chef, Chen Kenichi.
- Chen Pokong (1963–), author, political commentator and democracy activist
- Chen Shou, official and writer
- Cheung Chung-kiu, business magnate
- Deng Xiaoping, Chinese Paramount Leader during the 1980s, his former residence is now a museum.
- Guifeng Zongmi (780–841), Tang dynasty Buddhist scholar-monk, fifth patriarch of the Huayan school as well as a patriarch of the Heze lineage of Southern Chan
- Guo Moruo, renowned author
- Akio Hong, broadcaster
- Huang Jiguang, highly decorated soldier during the Korean War
- Jiang Zhuyun, revolutionary martyr
- Li Bai (701–762), poet of the Tang dynasty
- Li Bifeng, activist
- Li Ching-Yuen, herbalist, martial artist and tactical advisor, also known for extreme longevity claims
- Li Shou-min, better known as Huanzhulouzhu (1902–1961), novelist of the xianxia genre
- Li Shunxian (c. 900–926), Persian-Sichuanese poet, concubine of Emperor Wang Zongyan of Former Shu
- Li Yifeng, actor and singer
- Li Yuchun, singer, songwriter, and actress
- Liao Yiwu, author, reporter, musician, and poet
- Liu Yonghao, businessman
- Luo Ruiqing, army officer and politician
- Meng Caicheng, (蒙裁成, 1859–1928), activist in the Railway Protection Movement
- Ouyang Xiu (1007–22 September 1072), Confucian historian, essayist, calligrapher, poet, and official bureaucrat of the Song dynasty
- Sanyu (painter)
- Song Cheng-tsi (1892–1955), Anglican bishop
- Song Yonghua, scholar
- Su Shi (8 January 1037 – 24 August 1101), Confucian bureaucrat official, poet, artist, calligrapher, pharmacologist, gastronome, and official bureaucrat of the Song dynasty
- Su Xun (1009–1066), poet and prose-writer of the Song dynasty
- Su Zhe (1039–1112), poet and essayist, a Confucian bureaucratic official of the Song dynasty
- Tan Weiwei, singer and actress
- Tang Chun-i, philosopher and scholar
- Wang Jiujiang (1957–), painter
- Wang Jianlin, business magnate, investor, and philanthropist
- Wang Xiaoya, television host and media personality
- Wang Yi (pastor) (1973–)
- Wuzhun Shifan (1178–1249), Zen Buddhist monk
- Xiaoting(12 November 1999), singer member of Kep1er
- Xu Yiyang (12 August 1997), singer
- Xu Youyu, scholar
- Yang Xiong, poet, philosopher, and politician
- Y. C. James Yen (1890/1893–1990), educator
- Lucy Yi Zhenmei (1815–1862), Roman Catholic saint
- Yu Jie (1973–), Calvinist democracy activist
- Zhang Aiping, from Tongchuan District, Dazhou City, Vice Premier, State Councilor, and Minister of Defense
- Jane Zhang, singer and songwriter
- Zhang Lan, political activist
- Zhang Yong (restaurateur), Singapore's richest man in 2019
- Zhao Yiman, resistance fighter
- Zheng Ji, nutritionist, and pioneering biochemist
- Zhu De, general, warlord, politician, and revolutionary
- Zhuo Wenjun, poet
- Zou Rong, revolutionary martyr

== Sports ==
Professional sports teams in Sichuan include:

- Chinese Basketball Association
  - Sichuan Blue Whales
- Chinese Super League
  - Chengdu Rongcheng F.C.
- Chinese Volleyball League
  - Sichuan Volleyball Team
- China Table Tennis Super League
  - Sichuan Quan-Xing Table-Tennis Team

== Sister states and regions ==
- Washington, United States (1982)
- Michigan, United States (1982)
- Hiroshima Prefecture, Japan (1984)
- Yamanashi Prefecture, Japan (1985)
- South P'yŏngan, North Korea (1985)
- Kedah, Malaysia (1985)
- Midi-Pyrénées, France (1987)
- North Rhine-Westphalia, Germany (1988)
- Leicestershire, United Kingdom (1988)
- Piedmont, Italy (1990)
- Pernambuco, Brazil (1992)
- Tolna County, Hungary (1993)
- Valencian Community, Spain (1994)
- Brussels-Capital Region, Belgium (1995)
- Barinas State, Venezuela (2001)
- Friesland, Netherlands (2001)
- Almaty Province, Kazakhstan (2001)
- Mpumalanga, South Africa (2002)
- Cebu, Philippines (2006)
- Suphan Buri, Thailand (2010)
- Victoria, Australia (2015)
- Lavalleja, Uruguay (2020)

== See also ==
- 2008 Sichuan earthquake
- Bashu culture
- Chronicles of Huayang
- Eight Immortals from Sichuan
- The Good Person of Szechwan
- List of prisons in Sichuan
- Major national historical and cultural sites (Sichuan)
- Qutang Gorge
- Sichuan Airlines
- Sichuan cuisine
- Sichuan dialect
- Sichuan Giant Panda Sanctuaries
