= Linpan in Chengdu Plain =

Traditional communities in rural Sichuan, China

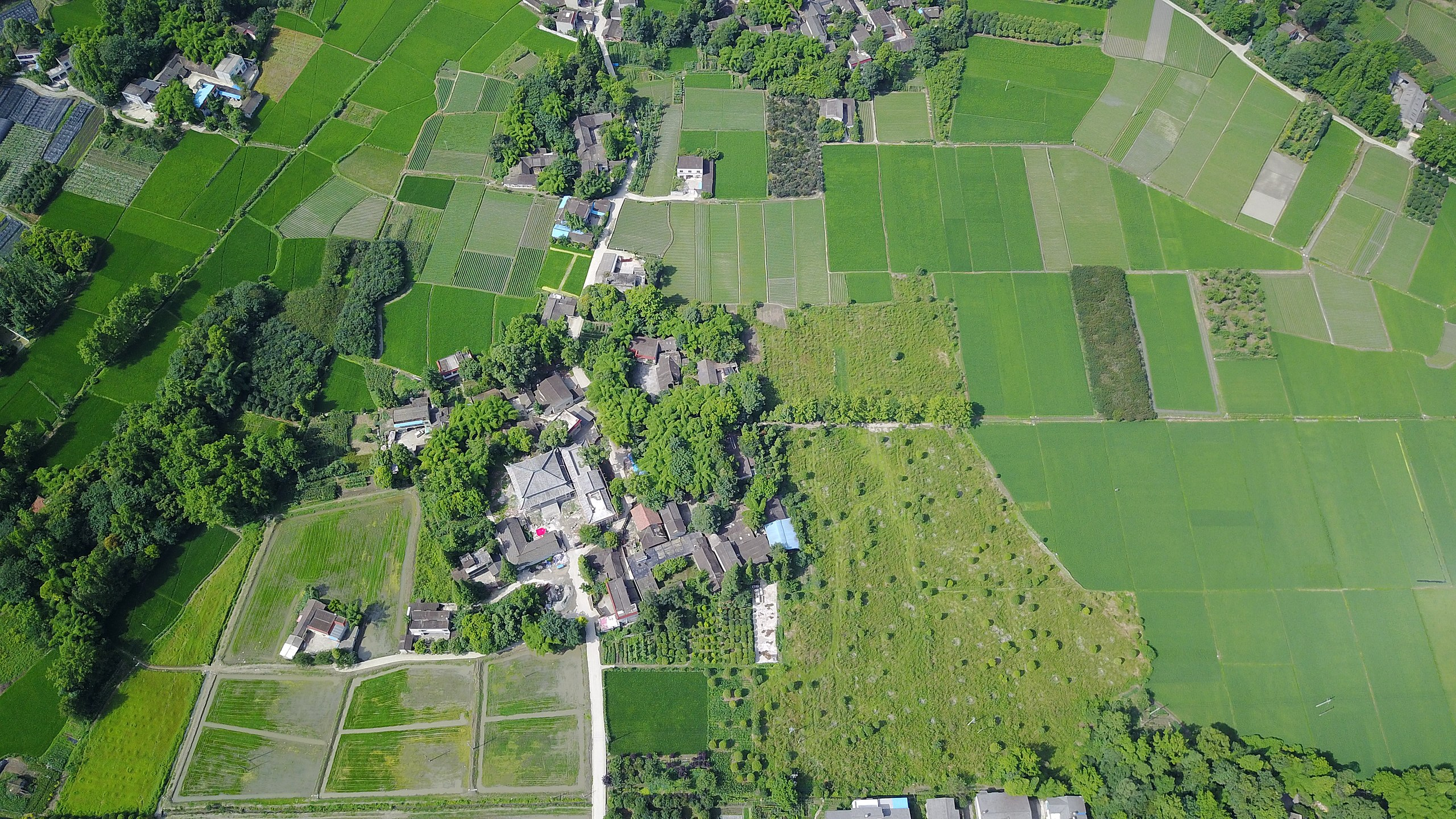
A typical Linpan unit in Pidu District, Chengdu

The Linpan in Chengdu Plain, also known as Linpan settlements, (simplified Chinese: 林盘; traditional Chinese: 林盤; pinyin: línpán, literally: surrounded by woods) are traditional rural communities in the Chengdu Plain, Sichuan, China. They are characterised by small-scale farming, rectangular fields, and natural elements such as water, trees, and bamboo, all of which are supported by the ancient Dujiangyan irrigation system. Linpan settlements adhere to traditional farming practices and culture, playing a crucial role in the preservation of the Chengdu Plain's natural environment. The main structures of the human environment include patches (vast plains of farmland), corridors (roads and irrigation canals), and matrices (small matrices consist of thousands of Linpan villages, while large matrices consist of towns), all of which contribute to the beauty and uniqueness of the Chengdu Plain's rural landscape.

Each Linpan unit tends to be inhabited by one or more clan- or surname-based units, which live in a decentralized manner. Smaller Linpan units generally contain a few dozen peasant families, while larger units may contain hundreds of households.

Linpan settlements originated during the Ancient Shu civilization, after a long period of immigration into the Chengdu Plain. Linpan culture draws heavily from the Taoist philosophy of pleasure, leisure, and freedom, which has been historically important in the Chengdu Plain. However, due to land development and pollution as a result of China's modernisation, the Linpan way of life is now under threat.

== Features ==
=== Culture ===
Modern Linpan settlements retain many aspects of traditional Chinese farming culture, thanks to their long history. Traditionally, Sichuan has been a region with an intensive farming culture, with the Chengdu Plain serving as an important place in its development. The plain provides the prerequisite conditions for agriculture, including favourable environmental conditions, a warm and humid climate, abundant water, and fertile land.

Thanks to the unique combination of the Dujiangyan irrigation system, the Linpan family system, and the region's ideal natural environment, the Linpan settlements share a number of unique elements, mostly focused on water. Linpan settlements combine traditional Chinese farming culture and Sichuan's water-based culture. For example, the Dujiangyan irrigation works evolved in tandem with the Linpan system, enabling the development of intensive agriculture. As a result, the Dujiangyan irrigation system serves as the core of the system and allows its existence.

=== Ecology ===
The Chengdu Plain, irrigated by the Dujiangyan irrigation system, is a semi-natural wetland ecosystem. It also provides a food base and living space for humans and animals alike. The mutualistic relationship between the woods and their inhabitants continues today. The main landscape elements in this environment are fields, woods, farmhouses, and water. Combined, these four elements form a network of interdependence:

- The relationship between woods and water integrates the forest and water network.
- The relationship between woods and fields creates a high level of biodiversity.
- The relationship between woods and farmhouses creates a pleasant microclimate for inhabitants and shields villages from wind.

In terms of non-crop vegetation, the dominant plants in the region are evergreen broad-leaved trees due to the subtropical humid climate. Linpan ecology demonstrates the characteristic plant distribution of subtropical humid climates, but with some distinctive variations. In contrast to the high overall biodiversity, vegetation around houses is comparatively uniform; the main vegetation types surrounding residential buildings are evergreen broad-leaved forests bamboo stands with frequencies of 25% and 32%, respectively. In most agriculture-focused Linpan settlements, the plant structure is dominated by a single type of tree or bamboo such as metasequoia or cedar. Mixed forests are usually found in rural tourism-oriented Linpan settlements.

=== Form ===
Linpan settlements lie between cities and towns, typically scattered across the countryside in a checkerboard pattern.

In terms of size, Linpan villages tend to be very small. A village's buildings, surrounding courtyards, and planted bamboo almost always lie within 30 metres (98 ft) of the village's centre. This kind of compact settlement facilitates daily farming activities.

Linpan buildings are typically one-story Western Sichuan folk residential buildings, shaped with a galley or in an L-shape. Individual households build their own homes. 3-5 households form a small Linpan unit, while 20-30 households form a large unit.

One of the most significant features of Linpan and Western Sichuan rural housing is the presence of a courtyard (known as a “Baba”), which serves as the heart of daily domestic and social activities. In these courtyards, inhabitants dry crops, hang out washed clothes, talk and play Mahjong with neighbors, and host family banquets ("Baba Yan").

== Causes of the formation of Linpan culture ==
=== Geographical and environmental conditions ===
The Chengdu Plain is a relatively independent geographic unit located in the western Sichuan Basin, with an area of approximately 9,100 square kilometres (3,500 sq mi) and an altitude of 450–750 metres (1,480–2,460 ft). The Chengdu Plain is an alluvial plain, and its fertile soil and flat landscape facilitate agriculture. In addition, the mild subtropical monsoon climate brings high heat and abundant rainfall, making it more suitable for human habitation and farming. With a warm winter and early spring, crops and bamboo can grow year-round.

Another unique advantage of the Chengdu Plain is the well-developed irrigation system. After the construction of the Dujiangyan, most fields were able to use gravity irrigation. Along with abundant surface water and groundwater, the region's irrigation system allowed the development of a dispersed rural lifestyle.

=== Economics and production ===
To promote crop production, farmers tended to scatter and live near their own land to devote their labour to rice farming. In addition, living near one's land avoided the problems of long-distance transportation of equipment and produce. Moreover, surplus manpower and large courtyards made it possible for farmers to supplement agricultural income by producing textiles, weaving bamboo baskets, raising livestock or growing fruits and vegetables. Thanks to the economic advantages presented by small, scattered communities, rural communities gradually evolved into the current Linpan pattern.

=== Migration ===
Historically, there have been six large-scale migrations from other Chinese provinces to Sichuan, creating a unique and inclusive immigrant culture. Migrants promoted the social and economic development of the region, and the various customs they introduced created features of a new culture. During the migration process, bloodlines became mixed and clan ties were diluted, so rather than being bound by kinship, people became increasingly connected through geography and profession. In new settlements, people could be equal regardless of their origins, allowing the scattered Linpan living pattern to flourish.

=== Culture and customs ===
The Western Sichuan Plain is an important source of Taoism. Since the Ancient Shu Civilization, people living in the region have valued nature and freedom over careers and regulations. Later generations of the Shu also inherited the philosophy of prioritizing pleasure, leisure, and freedom of life, which formed the social basis for Linpan culture. Linpan culture is also the result of inhabitants living in single-family homes, rather than in large unified homes with extended family (as is common elsewhere in China). By living in smaller units, inhabitants gained greater initiative and flexibility to live and produce.

== Distribution of Linpan ==
Linpan settlements are mainly distributed in the Chengdu Plain region of the Sichuan Basin. The Sichuan Basin is relatively inaccessible, surrounded by mountains with altitudes of 1,000–2,000 metres (3,300–6,600 ft) above sea level, and a few mountains which reach 3,000–4,000 metres (9,800–13,100 ft) above sea level. The basin covers an area of about 170,000 square kilometres (66,000 sq mi), with altitudes ranging between 300–700 metres (980–2,300 ft) above sea level.

The Chengdu Plain lies in the marginal region of the Sichuan Basin. The Chengdu Plain is located between the Longquan, Longmen, and Qionglai mountain ranges, and rivers originating from these mountains bring soil and water into the plain. The Min River and its tributaries run across the plain to form an expansive water network. Linpan settlements are mainly located in these flat areas which form the majority of the Chengdu Plain's area. In addition to Sichuan, the bordering provinces of Yunnan and Guizhou are also home to Linpan settlements.

Most Linpan Settlements are distributed in 14 districts (cities) of the Chengdu Plain, namely Longquanyi District, Pi County, Wenjiang District, Shuangliu District, Xindu District, Qingbaijiang District, Dayi County, Xinjin County, Jintang County, Pujiang County, Dujiangyan City, Pengzhou, Chongzhou City, Qionglai City, which cover an area of 11,711 square kilometres (4,522 sq mi). Within these districts, 141,100 Linpan settlements cover an area of 9,482 square kilometres (3,661 sq mi). The total Linpan resident population is approximately 449.03 million, accounting for 41.50% of the region's urban population and 77.09% total rural population.

== Types of Linpan settlements ==
=== Farming ===
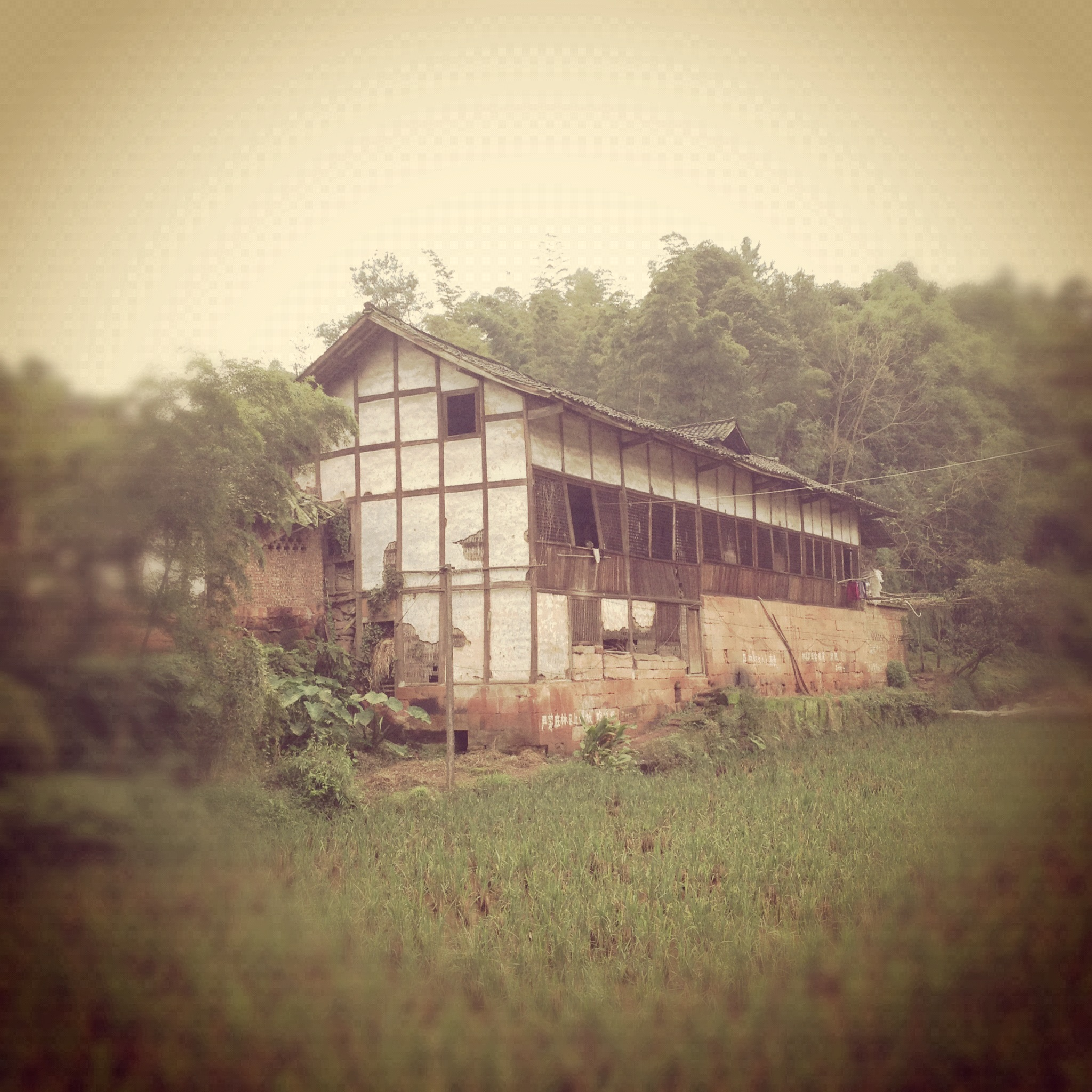
A farmhouse in Chengdu Plain.

This type of settlement focuses on agricultural production. Vegetation and buildings exist in tandem with crop fields. To facilitate intensive agriculture, several unique structures are present, including spaces for drying cereals and corn, stacking farming tools, and raising livestock.

=== Ecological or "hollow" ===
As China modernizes and urban living standards increase, inhabitants have immigrated to urban areas, leaving some settlements empty. These "hollow Linpan" are no longer fit for habitation, but rather serve an ecological role, preserving the local environment.

=== Rural tourism ===
Rapid population growth and urban sprawl have led to dwindling agricultural land resources. As a result, rural tourism, which combines agricultural production and tourist services, has become increasingly popular. Tourist-oriented Linpan settlements are mostly located in suburban areas, making use of environmental and transport advantages to develop inn and farmhouse catering services. Not only do these settlements satisfy the needs of rural inhabitants, but they also provide a vacation outlet for urban residents.

=== Specific industry ===
These settlements focus on a specific industry, and the surrounding agricultural and forest land is managed to facilitate the industry. Generally, these settlements have poorer aesthetics than other types of Linpan. This type of Linpan often specialises in a traditional industry and enhances it with modern techniques, such as the production of out-of-season vegetables and fruits in greenhouses.

== Threats to Linpan ==
With changes in land-use policies and urban-rural integration in China, the number of Linpan settlements has been slowly dwindling. Government policies have caused the removal of certain settlements or the merging of multiple settlements into one larger one. Additionally, many settlements have been left empty as inhabitants drift into cities seeking work. New construction practices of farmers and the government have also caused farmers to be located further away from their fields. These factors have caused the number of Linpan settlements to decrease; for example, Pi County, near Chengdu, had more than 11,000 settlements while only 8,000 exist now. A recent survey shows that the number of settlements that contain more than 10 households is less than 900.
