= Dujiangyan (disambiguation) =

Dujiangyan is an ancient irrigation system in China.

Dujiangyan may also refer to:

- Dujiangyan City, Sichuan, China, named after the irrigation system
- Dujiangyan (film), 1995 Chinese documentary film about the irrigation system
