= 2022 Ya'an earthquake =

Earthquake in Sichuan Province, China

2022 Ya'an earthquake 2022年芦山县地震
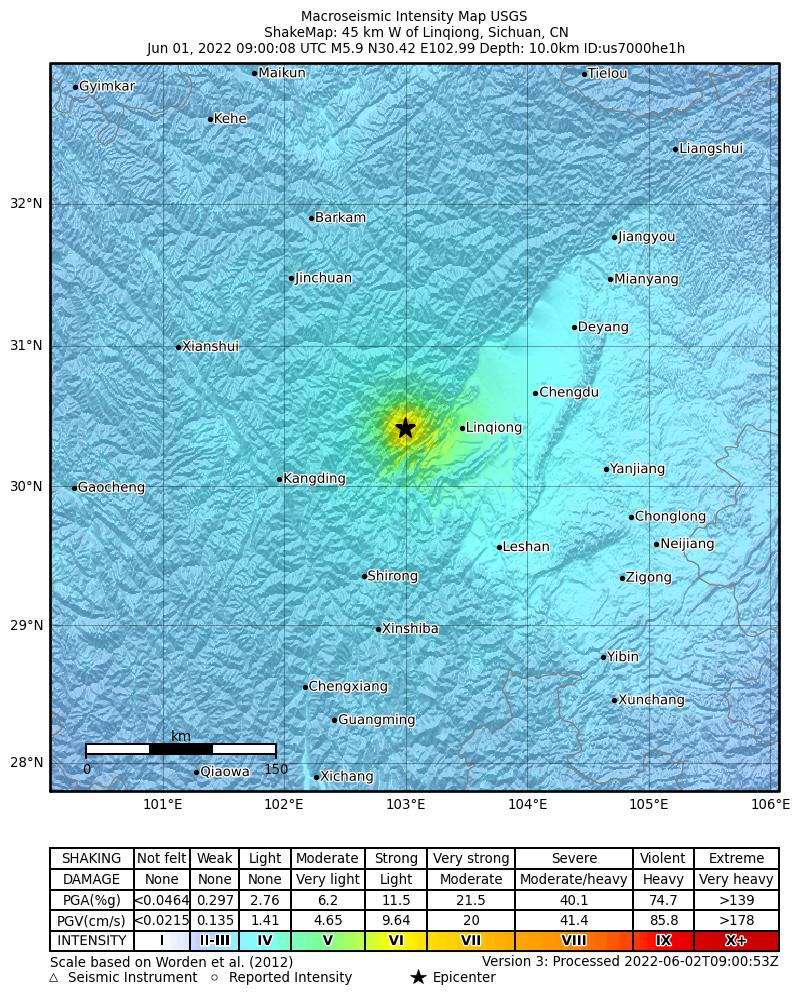

- Location within China
- UTC time: 2022-06-01 09:00:08
- ISC event: 624424142
- USGS-ANSS: ComCat
- Local date: 1 June 2022
- Local time: 17:00 CST (UTC+8)
- Magnitude: 5.8 M_{w}^{(USGS)} 6.1 M_{s}^{(CENC)}
- Depth: 12 km (7.5 mi) (USGS); 17 km (11 mi) (CENC)
- Epicenter: 30.416°N 102.989°E
- Type: Reverse fault
- Areas affected: Sichuan
- Max. intensity: CSIS VIII
- Casualties: 4 dead, 42 injured

On June 1, 2022, a moment magnitude (M_{w}) 5.8 or surface-wave magnitude (M_{s}) 6.1 earthquake struck Lushan County in Ya'an, Sichuan Province, China. At least four people were killed and 42 were injured. The earthquake had a maximum intensity of VIII on the China seismic intensity scale, causing damage to many homes and triggering rockslides.

== Tectonic setting ==
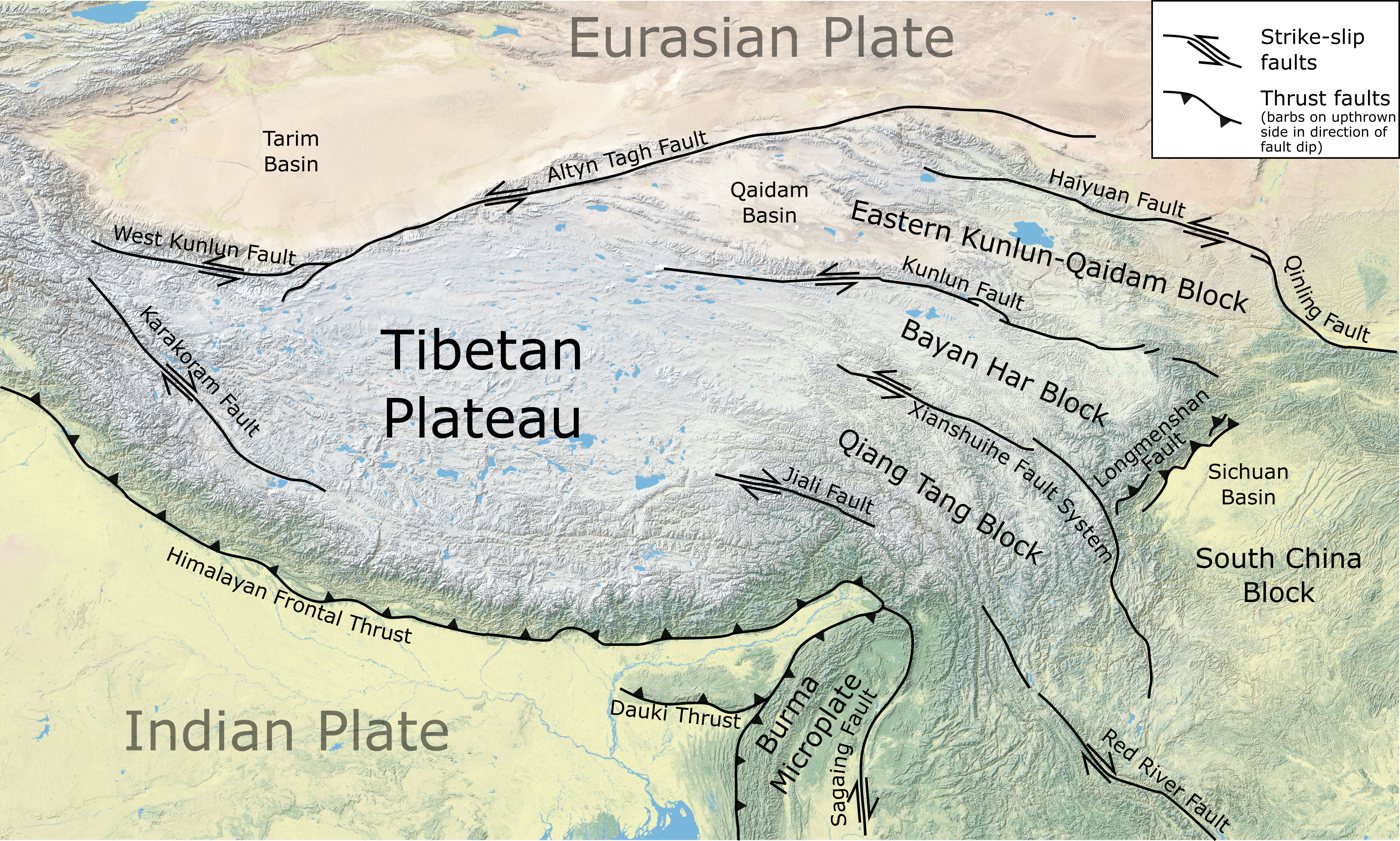
A map of the India-Asia deformation zone with active faults in the region.

The active plate convergence between the Indian and Eurasian plates along the Main Himalayan Thrust results in widespread intracontinental deformation within Central Asia. As the Indian plate collides with the Eurasian plate, part of the Eurasian plate is uplifted and deformed, resulting in the formation of the Tibetan Plateau. The internal deformation is accommodated along strike-slip and to a lesser extent, thrust faults. Major faults, including the Xianshuihe fault system, Kunlun Fault, Altyn Tagh fault, and Longmenshan Fault, accommodate this deformation. The deadly 2008 and 2013 earthquakes occurred due to thrust faulting along the Longmenshan Fault. Between the rupture areas there exists a seismic gap with the potential to generate a destructive earthquake in the future.

== Earthquake ==
The earthquake occurred at 17:00 local time. It had a moment magnitude of 5.8 and occurred at a depth of 12 km (7.5 mi), according to the United States Geological Survey (USGS). The China Earthquake Networks Center (CENC) measured the earthquake at a surface-wave magnitude (M_{s}) of 6.1 at a depth of 17 km (11 mi). A smaller magnitude 4.5 (mb 5.3) earthquake occurred three minutes later. The Sichuan Earthquake Administration said that this event was an aftershock of the magnitude 7.0 earthquake that occurred in April 2013, which killed nearly 200 people. Another earthquake, with a magnitude of 4.9, occurred nearby in May, damaging 468 houses.

Both earthquakes occurred on the Shuangshi-Dachuan Fault. The epicenter, according to earthquake experts from China, was located 2 km from the fault. The Shuangshi-Dachuan Fault is part of the larger Longmenshan Fault structure, which forms the eastern boundary of the Bayan Har block. A focal mechanism analysis suggest the 2022 earthquake occurred due to thrust faulting. Experts from the CENC said it is unlikely that this earthquake would be a foreshock to a larger event.

== Impact ==
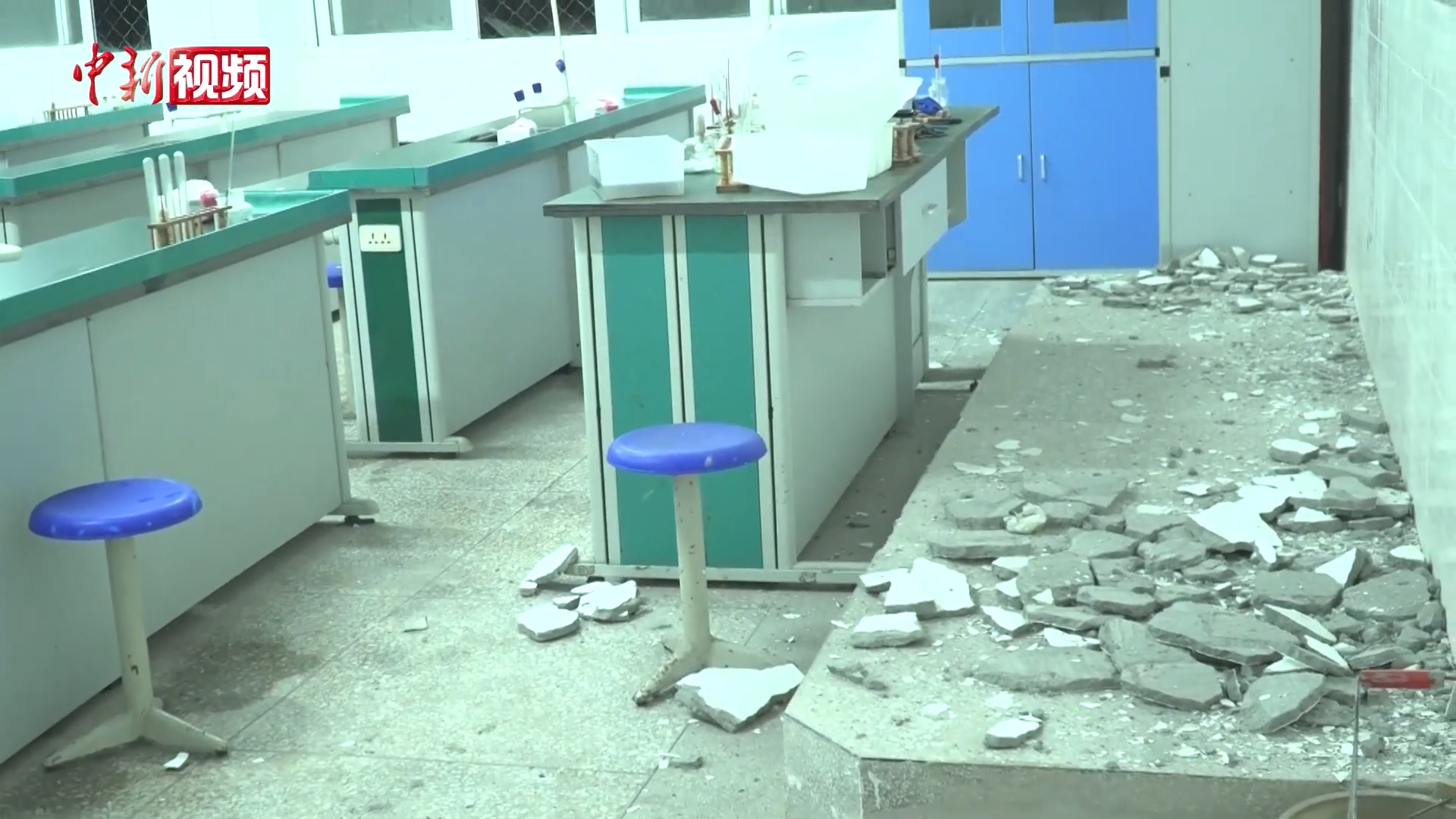
Damage to the walls of the Taiping Middle School in Lushan County.

A preliminary survey of the affected area determined that 135 homes in Ya'an and 4,374 in Lushan were damaged. Some parked vehicles in Baoxing County were crushed by falling boulders. Some nearby buildings and five hydropower stations were also damaged. In Taiping, damage was minimal; most buildings only suffered cracked or partially collapsed walls. Many houses were reconstructed to seismic codes after the 2008 and 2013 earthquakes. Video footage showed damaged buildings and debris on streets and large boulders blocking roads in the mountainous area. At least three county roads and China National Highway 351 were damaged by rockfalls. Officials in Sichuan said that there were no reports of collapsed buildings. The earthquake disrupted the supply of electricity to over 49,000 homes. Repairs were made and power supply was resumed to at least 18,000 homes.

All four fatalities and 42 injured individuals were reported in nearby Baoxing County. Some of the injured were transported to nearby hospitals for treatment. The Ya'an Municipal Party Committee Office said that the four victims were fatally struck by falling rocks.

The earthquake was felt with an intensity of at least VI over an estimated 3,887 km^{2} area. A maximum liedu of VIII was observed in Taiping, Shuangshi, Lingguan, and Muping. The intensity covered a 76 km × 65 km (131 km^{2}) area. Intensity VII was felt across a 979 km^{2} area. In Chengdu, the earthquake was felt VI.

== Emergency response ==
At least nine seconds of advanced warning was given to Ya'an, 44 km from the epicenter, and in Meishan, located 94 km from the epicenter. Warnings were also issued in Chengdu and Garzê Tibetan Autonomous Prefecture. An estimated 10 million residents around the earthquake epicenter received the early warning. As a precautionary measure, railway services at Chengdu East railway station were suspended and affected passengers were given a refund.

A Level 3 emergency response was ordered by the Chinese government on the four-level emergency response system. At least 4,500 personnel consisting of medical and emergency responders were dispatch to the epicenter area. In Meishan, 15 firetrucks and 60 personnel were dispatched. Local fire and rescue services were also activated. Staff at the Red Cross Society of China in Sichuan were mobilized to the affected area to distribute relief supplies. Officials from the Sichuan Provincial Department of Housing and Urban-Rural Development said that an investigation would be carried out to assess the damage. On June 2, electrical services was restored to over 48,000 households while an estimated 3,339 were still awaiting restoration.

A total of 12,772 residents were affected and displaced. Affected residents in Lushan were resettled in tents at a nearby school in Taiping. The school also served as a supply distribution center. Relief workers and resettled villagers reported that the walls of the school had cracks and shattered.

== See also ==
- List of earthquakes in 2022
- List of earthquakes in China
- List of earthquakes in Sichuan
