= 2013 Lushan earthquake =

Earthquake in Sichuan, China

- Location within Sichuan Location within China
- UTC time: 2013-04-20 00:02:47
- ISC event: 607304721
- USGS-ANSS: ComCat
- Local date: 20 April 2013
- Local time: 8:02 am CST
- Magnitude: 7.0 M_{s} (CENC) 6.6 M_{w} (USGS)
- Depth: < 13 km (8.1 mi)
- Epicenter: 30°17′02″N 102°57′22″E; Lushan County, Sichuan
- Areas affected: People's Republic of China (Sichuan, Chongqing, Shaanxi)
- Max. intensity: MMI VIII (Severe) CSIS IX
- Aftershocks: 1,815 (2022 aftershock M_{s} 6.1)
- Casualties: 196 dead 21 missing 13,484 injured

Ya'an earthquake
- Chinese: 雅安地震
Transcriptions
Standard Mandarin
- Hanyu Pinyin: Yǎ'ān Dìzhèn

Lushan earthquake
- Traditional Chinese: 蘆山地震
- Simplified Chinese: 芦山地震
Transcriptions
Standard Mandarin
- Hanyu Pinyin: Lúshān Dìzhèn

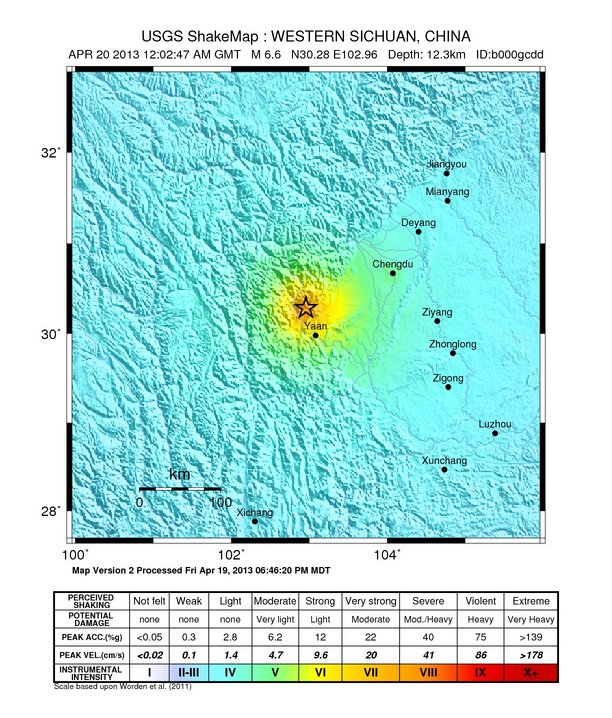
USGS ShakeMap of the Ya'an earthquake mainshock intensity

The Lushan earthquake or Ya'an earthquake (Standard Tibetan: གཡག་རྔ་ཡི་ས་ཡོམ་, Yak-ngai Sayom) occurred at 08:02 Beijing Time (00:02 UTC) on April 20, 2013. The epicenter was located in Lushan County, Ya'an, Sichuan, about 116 km (72 mi) from Chengdu along the Longmenshan Fault in the same province heavily impacted by the 2008 Sichuan earthquake. The magnitude of the earthquake was placed at M_{s} 7.0 by China Earthquake Data Center, M_{s} 7.0 by Russian Academy of Sciences, M_{w} 7.0 by Geoscience Australia, M_{w} 6.6 by the United States Geological Survey (USGS), M_{w} 6.6 by the European Alert System (EMSC) and M_{j} 6.9 by the Japan Meteorological Agency (JMA). 1,815 aftershocks have been recorded as of 00:00 (UTC+8h) April 22.

== Tectonic setting ==
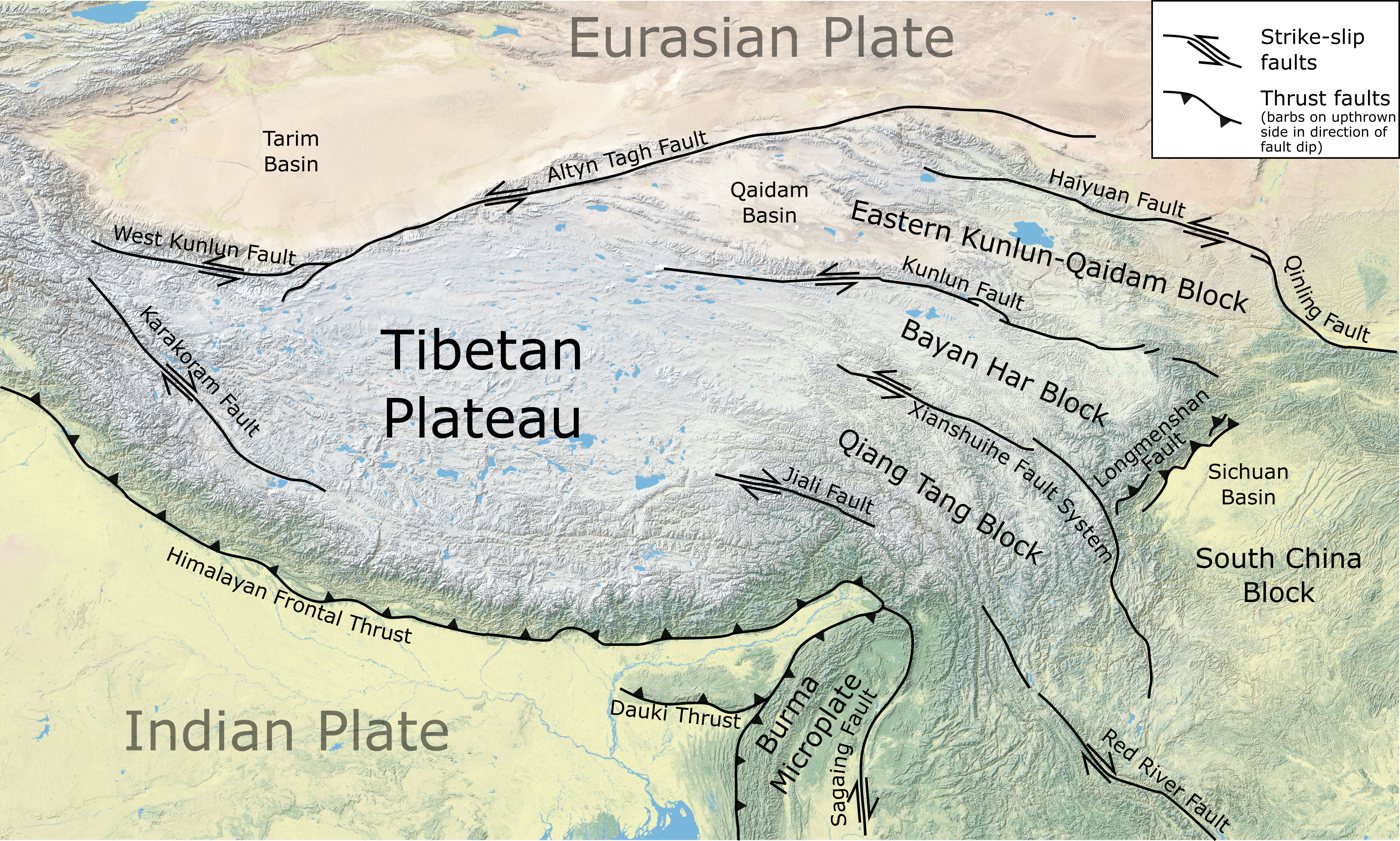
A map of the India-Asia deformation zone with active faults in the region.

The active plate tectonics of the Sichuan Basin is dominated by the north–south continental collision of the Indian plate and Eurasian plate. As the Indian plate collides along a convergent plate boundary known as the Main Himalayan Thrust, it being of continental crust does not subduct, rather, it plows into the Eurasian plate. This process severely deforms the Eurasian plate, uplifting the crust, forming the Tibetan Plateau. The force of the Indian plate converging pushes the Tibetan Plateau east, towards the Sichuan Basin, forming another zone of collision. This collision and resulting crustal deformation of the Eurasian plate is accommodated by the Xianshuihe fault system, Kunlun Fault, Altyn Tagh fault, and Longmenshan Fault. The presence of active faults in Sichuan makes the region vulnerable to damaging earthquakes. The deadly 2008 Sichuan earthquake occurred due to a thrust fault rupture on the Longmenshan Fault.

== Effects ==
Sichuan provincial government has held the 3rd press conference on April 21, reported that the earthquake has resulted in 193 people dead, 21 missing, 11248 injured and 852 of them seriously as of 2:00 PM (UTC+8h, April 21). Several townships suffered major damage, and many old buildings in Lushan collapsed. The electricity service was interrupted, and the electricity grids in the counties of Baoxing, Lushan, and Tianquan disintegrated. Telecommunication was interrupted in part of Ya'an. The Chengdu–Ya'an and Ya'an–Xichang sections of the G5 Beijing–Kunming Expressway were reserved exclusively for vehicles for rescue purpose and closed to other vehicles. The Xiaojin section (小金段) of Sichuan Provincial Highway 210 between Baoshan (宝山) and Lushan was interrupted. A debris dam appeared in Jinjixia (金鸡峡) of the Yuxi River (玉溪河) in Lushan. 2 volunteers were injured seriously in a traffic accident on the way to Lushan. However, around 60 giant pandas in the BiFengXia National Nature Reserve in Ya'an, were left unharmed by the devastating earthquake.

=== Lushan ===
The epicenter was located in Lushan. As of April 21, it was reported that 120 people died, 578 people were seriously injured, 5537 slightly injured, 278 saved from the ruins, and 3 still missing in Lushan County. The electricity grid disintegrated, and there were no water and gas services. According to China News Service, "100%" of houses in the 9 towns and townships and in the county seat were damaged.

=== Baoxing ===
As of April 21, it was reported that 24 people died, 2500 were injured, and 19 missing in Baoxing County. The electricity, water, and gas services were interrupted in the county seat. Most of houses in the county seat of Baoxing were uninhabitable. Water, medicines, and tents were urgently needed. Some rescuers had had to walk to Baoxing because major roads to there were cut off. On April 22, it was reported that the access to the county seat of Baoxing had been restored.

== Rescue efforts ==
About 8,000 soldiers from the People's Liberation Army were sent into the stricken area in the immediate aftermath of the earthquake, as well as 1,400 provincial rescue workers and 120 support vehicles. Also, 180 doctors from a Chinese emergency response team and search-and-rescue dogs were dispatched, with volunteers mobilized from other parts of the country.

Chinese Premier Li Keqiang toured the area and emphasized the need for quick action. Officials warned that regional rainfall and aftershocks were factors complicating the rescue efforts, with potential secondary effects like additional landslides and further building collapses being concerns. Impassible roads and damaged communications infrastructure posed substantial challenges to rescue efforts.

=== Hong Kong donations controversy ===
Hong Kong chief executive, Leung Chun-ying, put forward a proposal to the Legislative Council to donate HK$100m ($13m) to the Sichuan provincial government for relief efforts. However, the government motion was vehemently opposed by legislators, in particular pan democrats, who feared that the local government would misuse the funds destined to help with earthquake relief efforts. Apparent signs of misappropriations or misuse by local officials of $HK9 billion donated after the earthquake in 2008 was cited as one major concern. The proposal failed to win support of Hong Kong people. A civic campaign was started online to try to stop earthquake donations falling into the hands of corrupt officials; and the liberal Apple Daily highlighted embezzlement scandals on the mainland. To satisfy the legislature, the Hong Kong government was forced to donate the money to registered Hong Kong non-governmental organisations.

=== Day of mourning ===
On April 25, the provincial government of Sichuan announced that April 27 (seven days after the occurrence of Lushan earthquake) would be the day of mourning for those that passed in earthquake. Public entertainment was forbidden, and the sound of siren wailed for 3 minutes to mourn the loss of earthquake. The domestic media also mourned the passed in different ways. Baidu changed its background of the page to black. The social media also developed a special feature about the Lushan earthquake.

== See also ==
- List of earthquakes in 2013
- List of earthquakes in China
