= Zipingpu Dam =

Dam in China

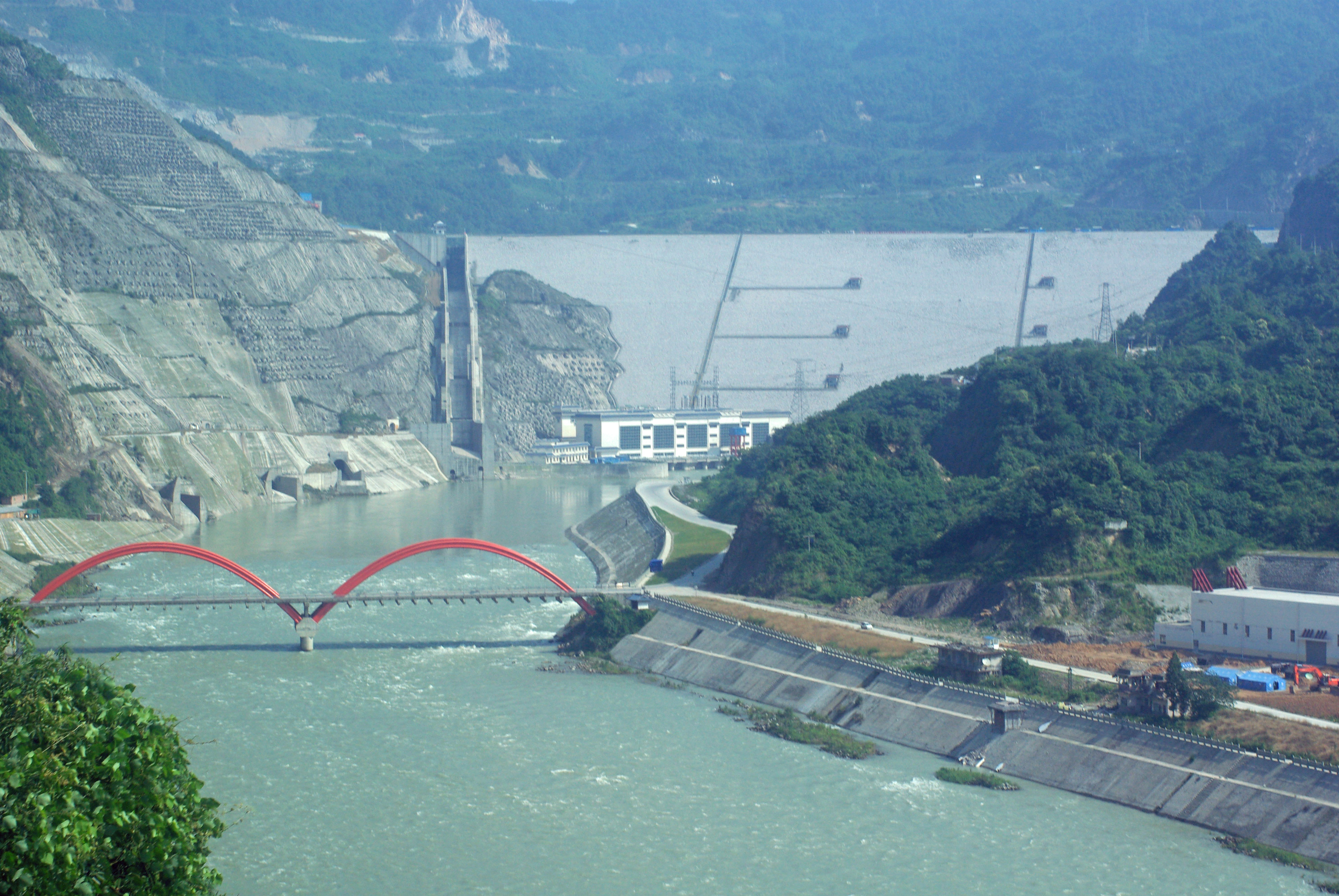

- Location within China
- Coordinates: 31°02′07″N 103°34′26″E
- Construction began: March 2001

Dam and spillways
- Type of dam: Embankment, concrete-face rock-fill
- Impounds: Min River
- Height: 156 metres (512 ft)
- Length: 663 m (2,175 ft)

Reservoir
- Creates: Zipingpu Reservoir
- Total capacity: 1,120,000,000 cubic metres (907,999 acre⋅ft)

Power Station
- Installed capacity: 760 MW

Zipingpu Dam (Chinese: 紫坪铺水利枢纽) is an embankment dam on the Min River near the city of Dujiangyan, Sichuan Province in southwest China. It consists of four generators with a total generating capacity of 760 MW. Construction began in 2001 and was finished in late 2006. The dam site was originally developed during the Shu-Han nearly 2000 years ago.

The traditional Dujiangyan Irrigation System consisting of canals, levees, and dams, has been in use since 256 BC.

== Controversy ==
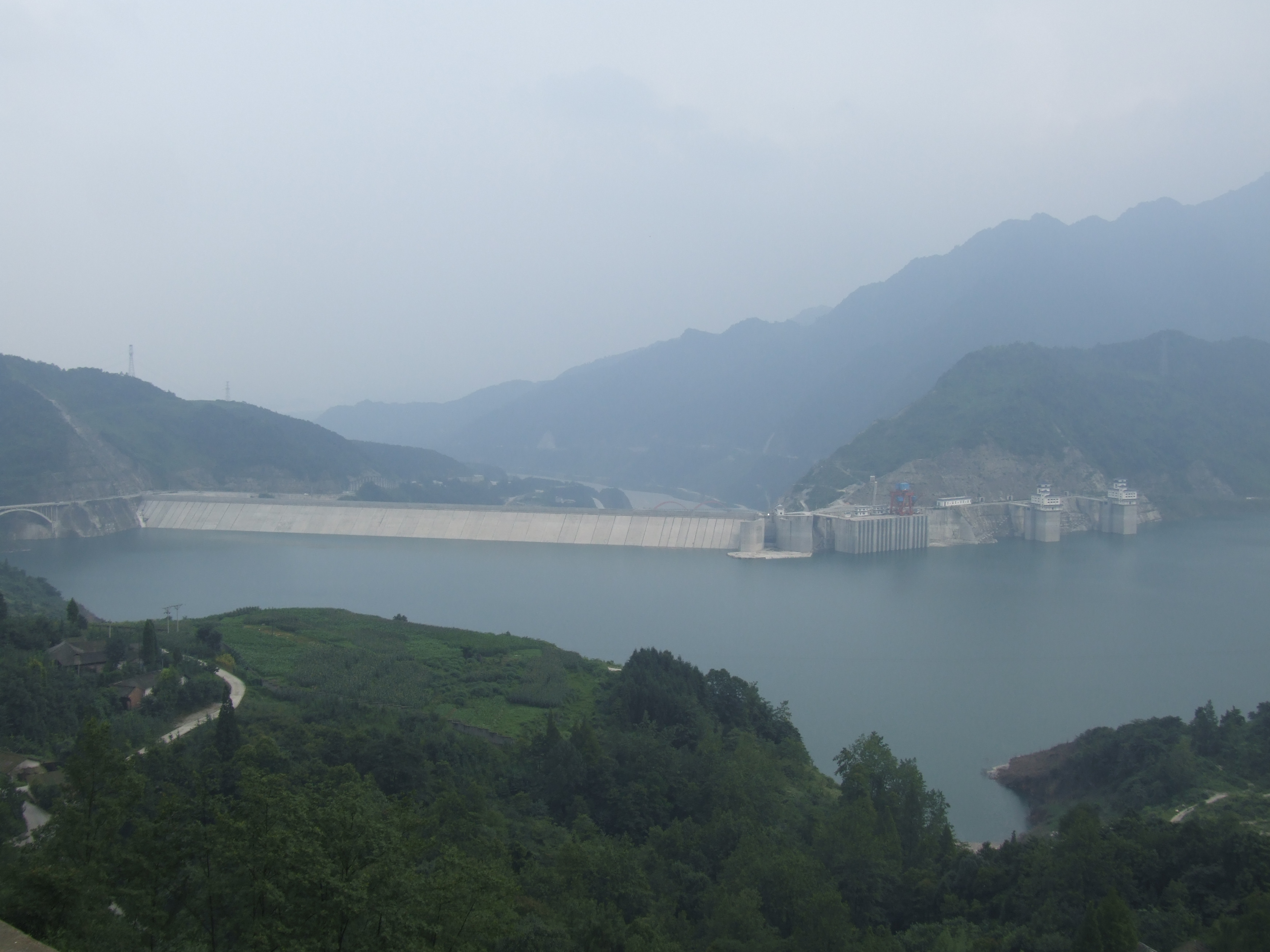
A view from the north side of Zipingpu when the water is reserved

The 7.9 magnitude quake on May 12, 2008 caused some damage to the dam, with its wall being cracked and fissured. The reservoir had to be gradually drained to permit consolidation works.

The reservoir is located just a few kilometers from the 2008 earthquake epicenter, and just a few hundred meters from the fault. Some geologists hypothesized that the loading and unloading of the crust below the reservoir caused by changes in the water level may have somehow acted as a trigger to the earthquake. However, this hypothesis has not been demonstrated.

== See also ==
- List of power stations in China
