= Min River (Sichuan) =

River in Sichuan, China

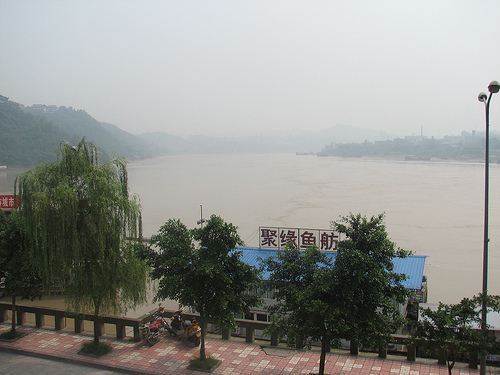

Location
- Country: People's Republic of China
- Province: Sichuan

Physical characteristics
- Source
  - location: Songpan, Sichuan
  - coordinates: 28°46′14″N 104°37′56″E
- Mouth
  - location: Yangtze at Yibin, Sichuan
- Length: 735 km (457 mi)
- Basin size: 133,000 km^{2} (51,000 sq mi)
- Discharge
  - location: Yibin
  - average: 2,850 m^{3}/s (101,000 cu ft/s)

Basin features
- Tributaries
  - right: Dadu River

Min River
- Chinese: 岷江
Transcriptions
Standard Mandarin
- Hanyu Pinyin: Mín jiāng
- IPA: [mǐn tɕjáŋ]

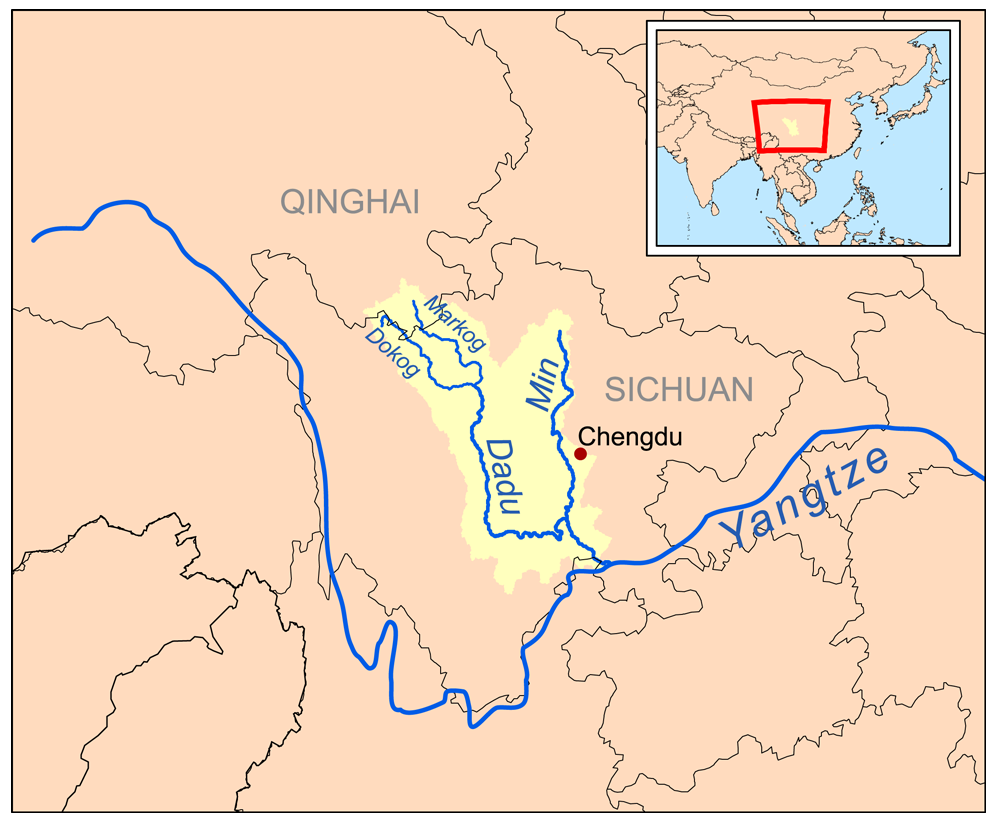
Map of the Min River drainage basin

The Min River (Chinese: 岷江; pinyin: Mínjiāng) is a 735-kilometer-long river (457 mi) in central Sichuan province, China. It is a tributary of the upper Yangtze River, which flows through Chengdu and joins at Yibin. Within China, it was traditionally taken as the main course of the upper Yangtze before extensive exploration of its sources.

== Geography ==
The Min River flows in the general southern direction. It starts in north-central Sichuan, where its basin is limited by the Qionglai Mountains in the west and the Min Mountains in the east. The river passes through the Longmen Mountains and enters the plains of the Sichuan Basin near Dujiangyan. In that area, the ancient Irrigation System and the modern Zipingpu dam are located. The Giant Buddha of Leshan is built into the stone banks of the Min River.

== Names ==
Some 19th-century Western authors used the name Blue River as the "colloquial name" for the Minjiang, after the former local Chinese name Qingshui (清水, lit. "Clear water"), and the belief that the Min constituted the main course of the Yangtze, which was itself known to Europeans as the "Blue River".

== Wildlife ==
A survey by biologist Deng Qixiang found that only 16 of the 40 fish species recorded in the 1950s can be found today. The Sichuan Taimen, a protected species, has not been seen in one stretch of river, the Wenchuan, for an entire decade.

== History ==
Located along the Min River is the oldest surviving water management scheme built by hydraulic engineer Li Bing, helping to significantly expand the power of the Qin state and triggering a population boom in the Chengdu plain. It was built about 2,300 years ago. The first Western academic to research its history was Joseph Needham. The scheme became known as the Dujiangyan Irrigation System.

== Dams ==
The Min is being heavily developed, primarily for hydroelectric power. Twenty-seven dams have been completed, are under construction, or are planned for the river as of March 2014. Those dams are listed below from downstream to upstream.

- Pianchuangzi Dam – Planned, 740 MW
- Longxikou Dam – Planned, 360 MW
- Jianwei Dam – Planned, 360 MW
- Shazui Dam – Planned, 250 MW
- Banqiaoxi Dam – Planned, 30 MW
- Yangliuhu Dam – Planned, 76.5 MW
- Zipingpu Dam – Completed, 760 MW
- Yingxiuwan Dam – Completed, 135 MW
- Taipingyi Dam – Completed, 260 MW
- Futangba Dam – Completed, 360 MW
- Shaba Dam – Under construction, 720 MW
- Jiangsheba Dam – Completed, 96 MW
- Yangmaoping Dam – Planned, 3.4 MW
- Tongzhong Dam – Completed, 49.5 MW
- Nanxin Dam – Completed, 9.6 MW
- Shigu Dam – Completed, 2.7 MW
- Zongqu Dam – Planned, 2 MW
- Yaneryan Dam – Planned, 66 MW
- Feihongqiao Dam – Planned, 120 MW
- Jinlongtan Dam – Completed, 180 MW
- Tianlonghu Dam – Completed, 180 MW
- Xiaohaizi Dam – Completed, 48 MW
- Lianhuayan Dam – Planned, 111 MW
- Wulibao Dam – Planned, 157 MW
- Longpan Dam – Planned, 72.6 MW
- Xiningguan Dam – Planned, 37.2 MW
- Hongqiaoguan Dam – Planned, 68.5 MW

== See also ==
- List of rivers in China
