= Li Bing (Qin) =

3rd-century Chinese engineer

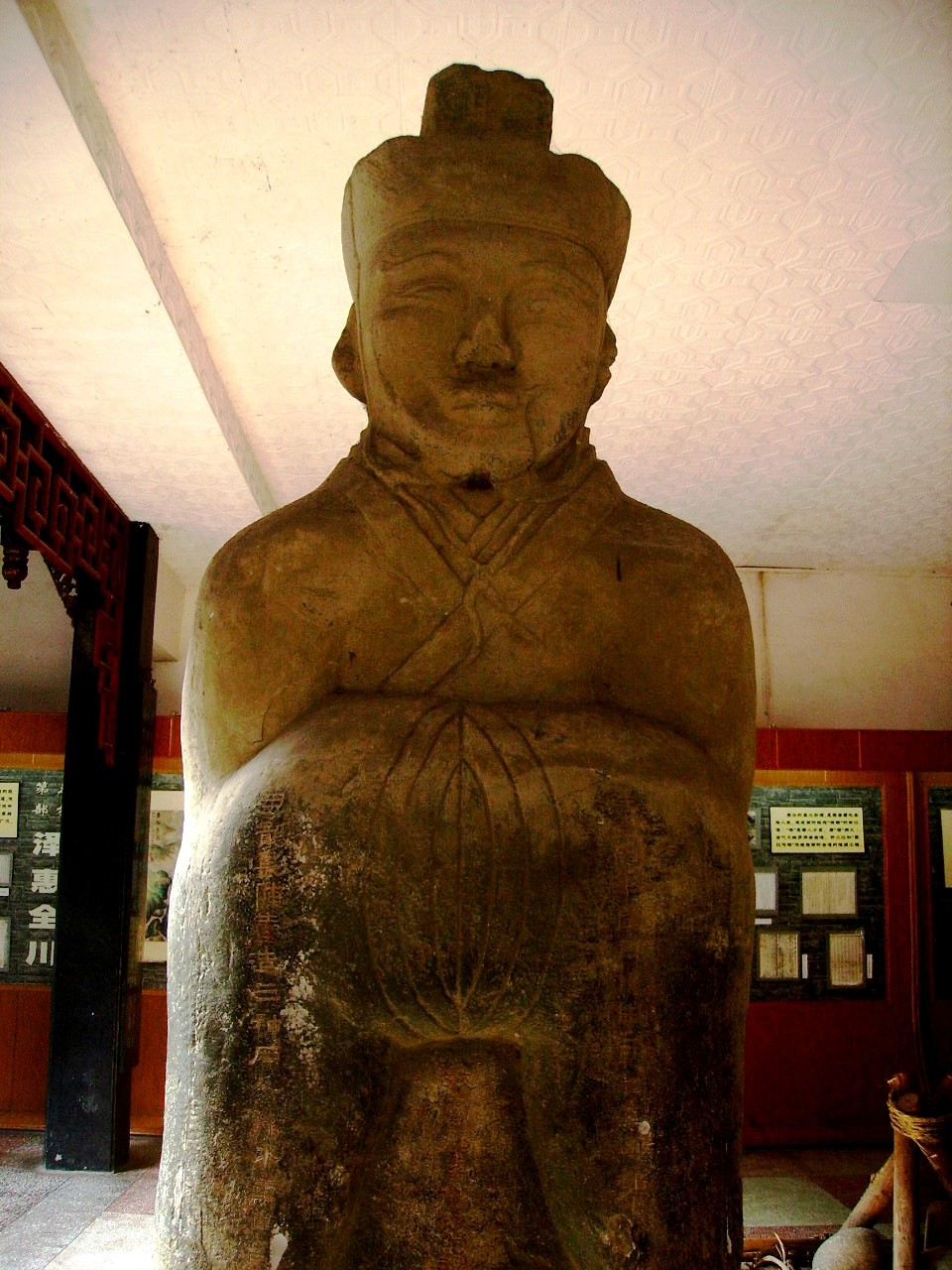
Statue of Li Bing at Erwang Temple, Dujiangyan, sculpted during the Eastern Han Dynasty (25-220 AD)

Li Bing (Chinese: 李冰; pinyin: Lǐ Bīng; c. 3rd century BC) was a Chinese hydraulic engineer and politician of the Warring States period. He served the state of Qin as an administrator and is revered for his work on the Dujiangyan River Control System, which both controlled flooding and provided irrigation water year-round, greatly increasing the productivity of the valley. Li Bing became a cultural icon, known as the vanquisher of the River God and is compared to the Great Yu.

Dujiangyan is still in use today and is listed as a UNESCO World Heritage Site.

== Life and career ==
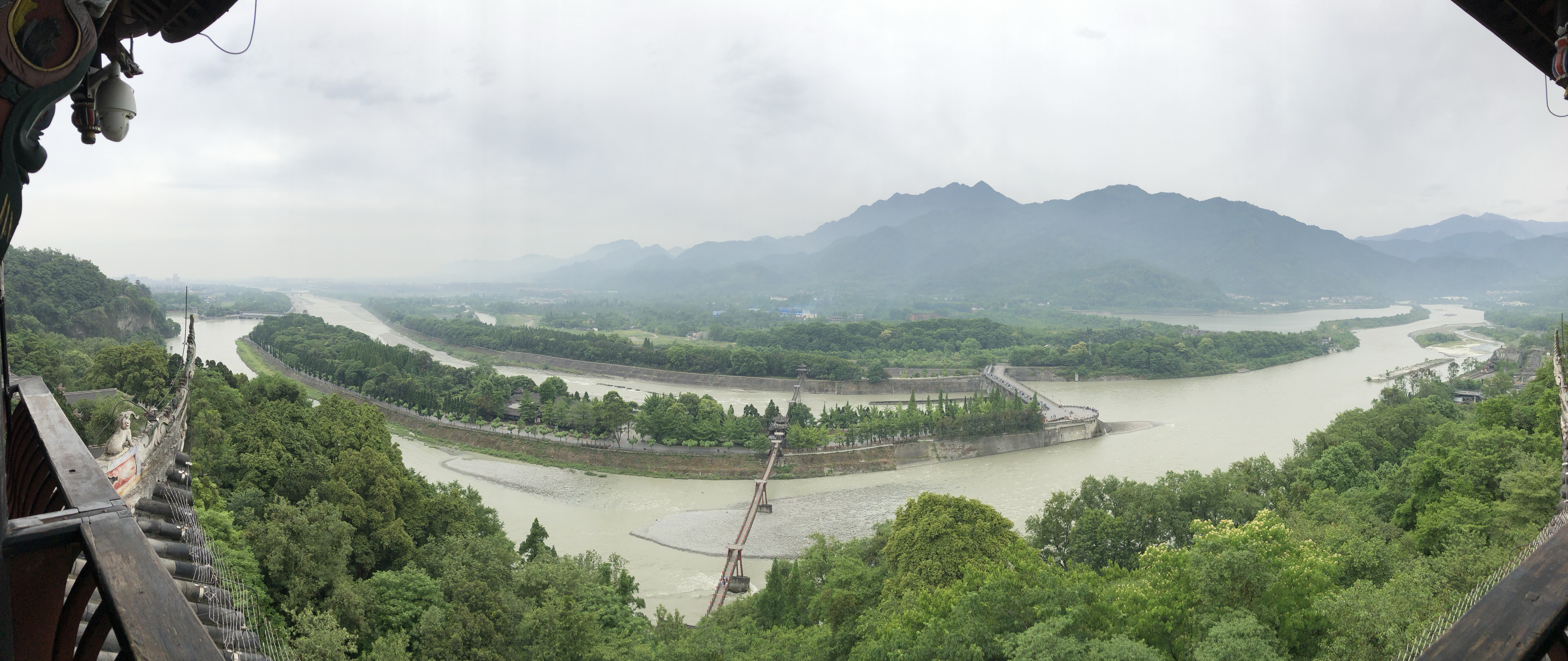
The central sections of the Dujiangyan.

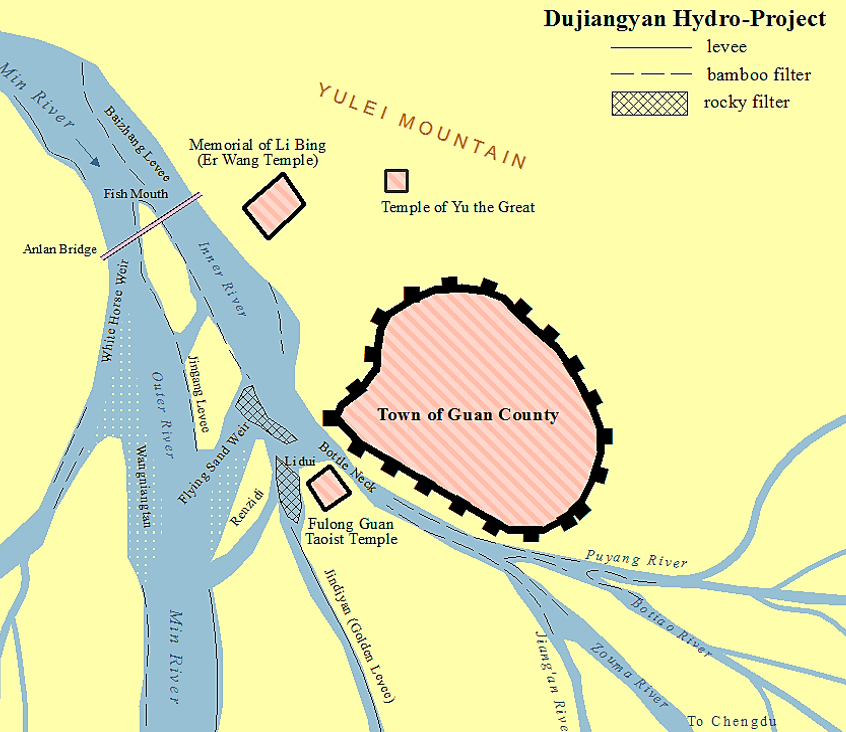
The map showing the plan of Dujiangyan project

King Zhaoxiang of Qin (r. 306–251 BC) dispatched Li Bing as a joint military and civilian governor (shou) over Shu, a recently defeated state in Sichuan province, Southwest China, just west of modern Chengdu. According to the Records of the Grand Historian, Li Bing was appointed governor of Shu in c. 277 BC. However, the Chronicles of Huayang place Li Bing in Shu in 272 BC. He arrived just as Zhang Ruo had put down the last of the marquis rebellions and moved out to engage the Chu city of Yan. Zhang Ruo did not leave any incumbent ministers, and Li Bing had complete control over Shu. "When he arrived in Shu, Li Bing witnessed the sufferings of local people from frequent flooding of the Min River." Additionally, the Qin monarchy had been sending its exiles to this state, and the Qin military needed food and infrastructure.

Li Bing then created "the largest, most carefully planned public works project yet seen anywhere on the eastern half of the Eurasian continent." It would be called Dujiangyan. He conducted an extensive hydraulic survey of the Min River to stabilize the waters from flooding settlements and plot out an extension into Chengdu. This extension would be a fair way to provide military logistical support to the Chengdu supply lines. This is standard practice for Qin administrators who routinely combine their agricultural projects for civilian and military purposes. The Min River is 735 km long and it is the largest and the longest of the Yangtze tributaries.

The Qin administration was more experienced working with arid lands than wet rice paddies. Additionally, slowing the water current reduced the river's ability to carry away large amounts of sediment. At peak discharge, the Min flows at about 5000 or even 6000 cubic meters per second. At low water, it lessens to about 500 cubic meters per second. On the other hand, the water diversion would have a positive effect and on the Qin system of land distribution with wet paddy rice in the Chengdu plains.

The native Animist people of Shu believed that the Min was a deity. Sima Qian's Shiji relates that upon appointment as administrator of Po, a province of Wei, Ximen Bao discouraged the local belief that the god of the river required a bride, and punished the local gentry and bureaucrats who took advantage of such superstitions. Administrators across the region commonly took such actions, but Ximen Bao failed. Therefore, to avert a similar massive revolt, Li Bing set out to end this practice by what Steven Sage describes as a "combination of tact and showmanship." He set up a temple to honor the Min deity, then offered his own two daughters as brides to the deity. In preparation, he set up a large nuptial banquet along the river and offered a toast. When the river deity did not drink his glass of wine, Li, deeply offended, ran off with a drawn sword. The crowd then saw two bulls prepared in advance, fighting along the river bank. Symbolically, this was Li Bing in a duel with the deity. Li Bing returned, sweating as if in battle, and called for assistance. One of his lieutenants ran up to the bull that Li Bing had designated as the deity and killed the bull. Li Bing subdued the river spirit, and the local people were satisfied.

The workers were primarily exiles from lands conquered by the Qin and the local population.
