= Chengdu Plain =

Alluvial plain in the Sichuan Basin

Coordinates: 30°28.1′N 103°53.9′E

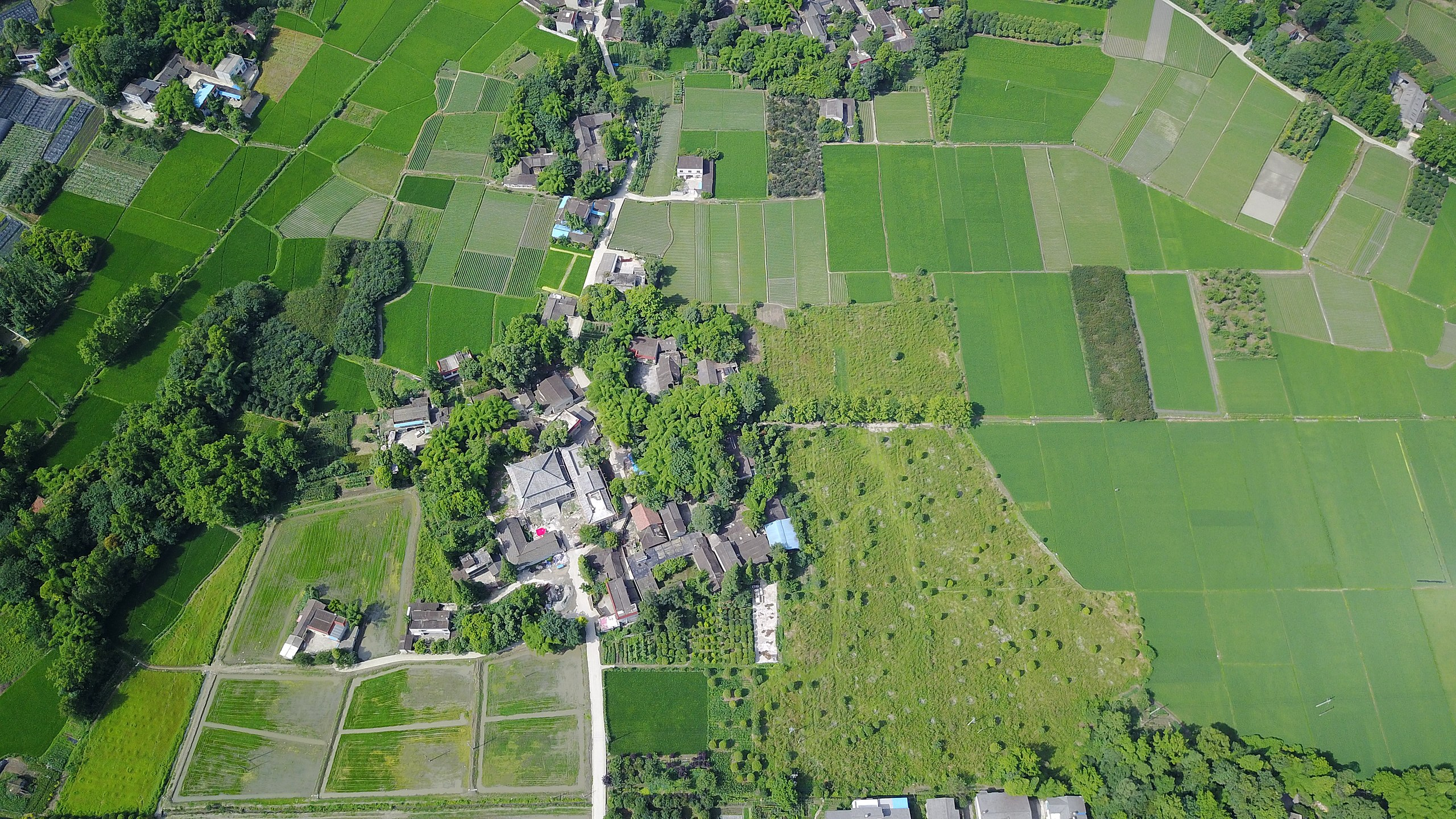
Rural landscape of the Chengdu plain

The Chengdu Plain (Chinese: 成都平原; pinyin: Chéngdū Píngyuán), referred to in Sichuanese as the Western Sichuan Plain (Chinese: 川西坝子; Sichuanese Pinyin: Cuan^{1}xi^{1} Ba^{4}zi^{3}), is an alluvial plain located in the western part of the Sichuan Basin in southwestern China. Chengdu, the capital of Sichuan, is located at the center of it.

The plain has fertile soil and a favorable climate for rice cultivation, giving it importance in agriculture.

The Chengdu Plain has historically been difficult to reach from the coastal regions of China, leading to it developing its own distinct culture. Only after the beginning of the 20th century, transportation became less inconvenient. In Chinese and Western literature and travel accounts, the plain has long been celebrated for its fertile land, good climate and varying landscape.

== See also ==
- Linpan in Chengdu Plain, traditional local settlement type
- Dujiangyan irrigation system
