= Dujiangyan (film) =

- Directed by: Liu Lizhong
- Release date: 1995
- Country: China
- Language: Chinese

Dujiangyan (Chinese: 都江堰; pinyin: Dūjiāngyàn) is a 1995 Chinese documentary film directed by Liu Lizhong. It won Huabiao Award for the Best Scientific Documentary film.

== Plot ==
The film introduces the history and technology of the Dujiangyan irrigation system, discusses its influence on the economy of Sichuan and the culture of China.
