= Longmenshan Fault =

Seismic fault in China

Coordinates: 30°N 105°E

- Chinese: 龙门山断层
Transcriptions
Standard Mandarin
- Hanyu Pinyin: Lóngménshān Duàncéng
- Wade–Giles: Lúngménshān Tuànts'éng

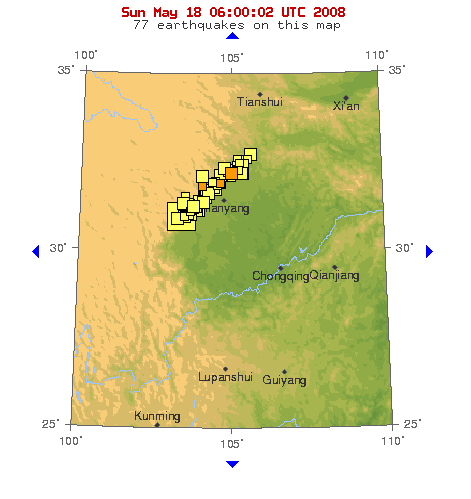
A USGS map of the Sichuan earthquake zone showing dozens of aftershocks within the Longmen Shan mountain region.

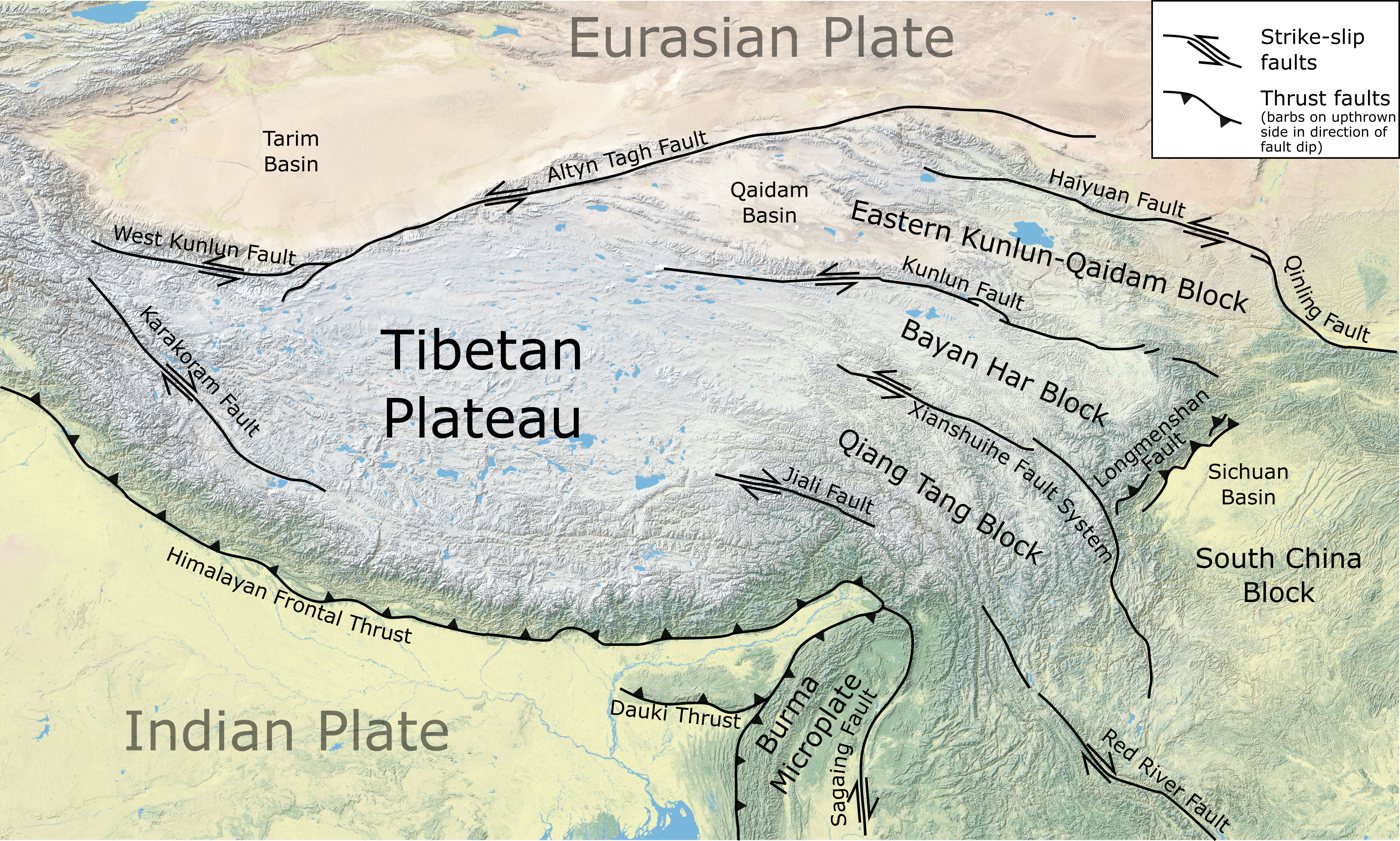
Tectonic map of the Tibetan Plateau showing the main structures

The Longmenshan Fault (Chinese: 龙门山断层) is a thrust fault which runs along the base of the Longmen Mountains in Sichuan province in southwestern China. The strike of the fault plane is approximately NE. Motion on this fault is responsible for the uplift of the mountains relative to the lowlands of the Sichuan Basin to the east. Representing the eastern boundary of the Qinghai-Tibet Plateau, it is a border formation between the Bayan Kola block in the Plateau and the South China block in the Eurasian plate. The 2008 Wenchuan, 2013 Lushan and 2022 Ya'an earthquakes occurred along this fault.

A study by the China Earthquake Administration (CEA) states:

"The late-Cenozoic deformations in this fault (that caused the 2008 Wenchuan earthquake) are concentrated in the Guanxian-Jiangyou fracture (hill-front fracture), Yingxiu-Beichuan fracture (mid-fracture), Wenchuan-Mao County fracture (hill-back fracture), and their related folds. The recent M_{s} 8.0 earthquake occurred on the Yingxiu-Beichuan fracture, as a result of Longmenshan thrust pushing southeastward combined with clockwise shears.

Since Holocene (10,000), Yingxiu-Beichuan fracture has had evident activities. Its long-term geological slip rate is slower than 1 mm per year. GPS observations confirm the current structural deformation of the Longmenshan formation to be characterized by thrust and right-handed shears, but with a low deformation rate. Therefore, Longmenshan formation and its internal fractures constitute a special type that has low earthquake frequences but the potential to cause super strong earthquakes."

== Morphology ==
The American Geophysical Union publication Tectonics describes the 5 km high escarpment thus:

"In the Longmen Shan region, however, the topographic margin of the Tibetan Plateau is one of the world's most remarkable continental escarpments. Elevations rise from circa 600 m in the southern Sichuan Basin to peaks exceeding 6500 m over a horizontal distance of less than 50 km. Regional topographic gradients typically exceed 10% along this mountain front and rival any other margin of the plateau."
