= Lushan County, Sichuan =

Lushan County 芦山县
- County
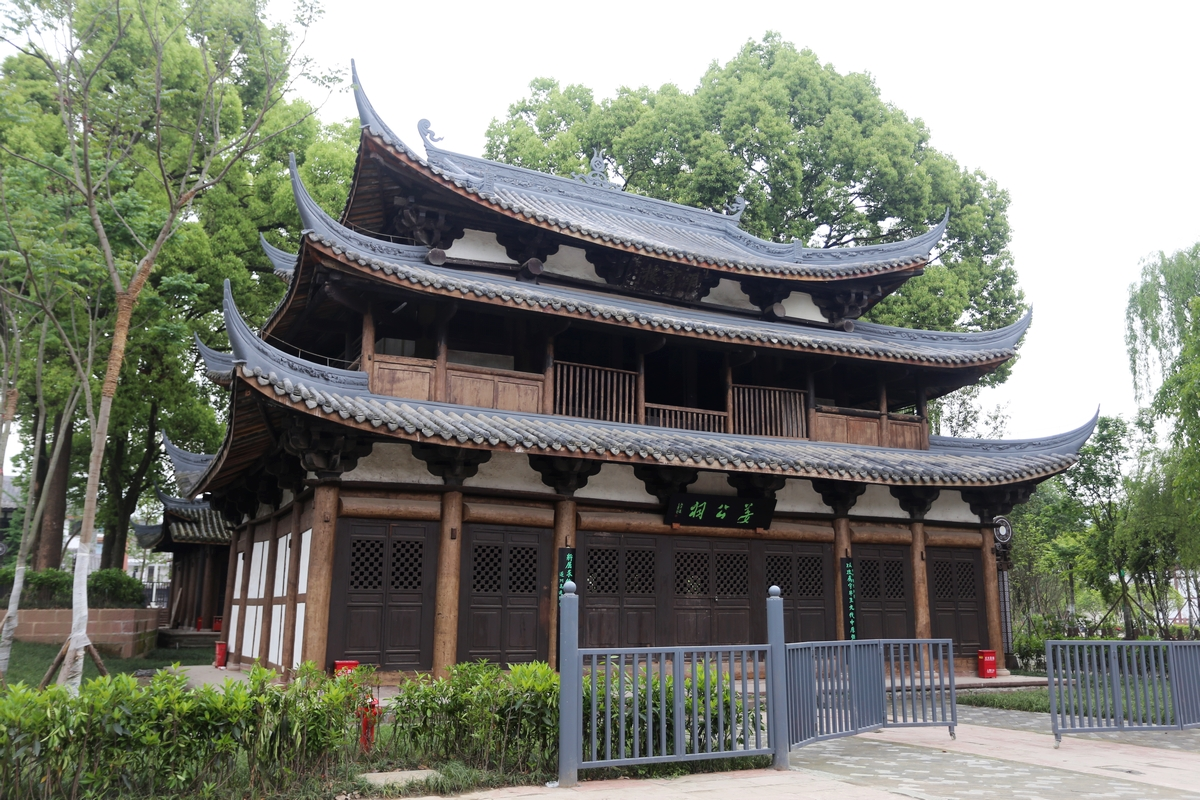

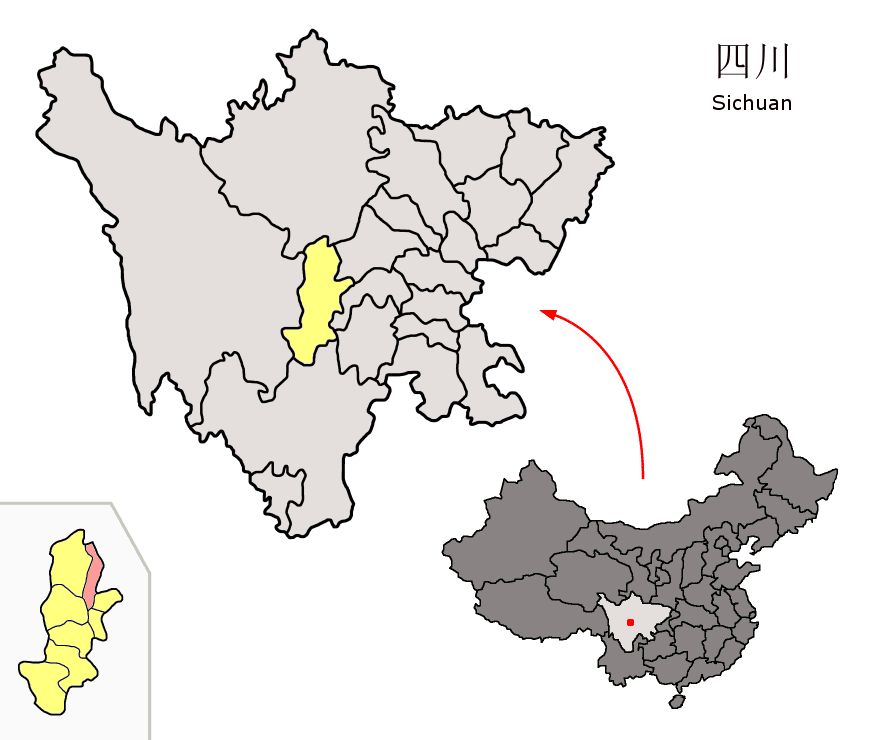
- Location of Lushan County (red) and Ya'an City (yellow) within Sichuan
- Country: China
- Province: Sichuan
- Prefecture-level city: Ya'an
- County seat: Luyang

Area
  - Total: 1,364 km^{2} (527 sq mi)

Population (2020 census)
  - Total: 99,824
  - Density: 73.18/km^{2} (189.5/sq mi)
- Time zone: UTC+8 (China Standard)
- Postal code: 625600
- Area code: 0835
- Website: www.yals.gov.cn

Lushan County (simplified Chinese: 芦山县; traditional Chinese: 蘆山縣; pinyin: Lúshān Xiàn) is a county of Sichuan Province, China. It is under the administration of Ya'an city.

== Administrative divisions ==
Lushan County comprises 1 subdistrict, 6 towns and 1 township:

subdistrict

- Luyang Subdistrict (芦阳街道)

towns

- Feixianguan Town (飞仙关镇)
- Shuangshi Town (双石镇)
- Taiping Town (太平镇)
- Dachuan Town (大川镇)
- Siyan Town (思延镇)
- Longmen Town (龙门镇)

township

- Baosheng Township (宝盛乡)

== Historical Monuments ==
An ancient monument, located in Lushan County and dating to 205 AD of the Eastern Han Dynasty, is the remains of the mausoleum of Fan Min (樊敏). It is known as "Fan Min's Gate Towers and Sculptures" (樊敏阙及石刻), and, according to the archaeologist Chêng Tê-k'un (1957), includes the earliest extant full-size tortoise-born stele. The stele has rounded top with a dragon design in low relief - a precursor to the "two intertwined dragons" design that was very common on such steles even in the Ming and Qing Dynasties, over a thousand years later.

== 2013 earthquake ==
The earthquake was centered in the district and causing more than 100 deaths and property damage directly and indirectly by the quake and by landslides. In an immediate response, the People's Liberation Army sent about 8,000 soldiers to the impact site, as well as 1,400 provincial rescue workers and 120 support vehicles.

Earthquakes with a higher than 5
Date	Hour (UTC)	Magnitude (USGS)	Latitude	Longitude	Depth
April 20, 2013	12:02 am	6.6	30.284°N	102.956°E	12.3 km
April 20, 2013	1:11 am	5.0	30.218°N	102.876°E	10 km
April 20, 2013	1:37 am	5.1	30.283°N	103.001°E	12 km
April 20, 2013	3:34 am	5.1	30.181°N	102.928°E	12.3 km
April 20, 2013	8:53 pm	5.2	30.328°N	103.071°E	9.8 km
April 21, 2013	3:59 am	5.0	30.209°N	103.032°E	12.2 km
April 21, 2013	9:05 am	5.2	30.328°N	102.993°E	9.4 km

== Climate ==
Climate data for Lushan, elevation 744 m (2,441 ft), (1991–2020 normals, extremes 1981–2010)
Month	Jan	Feb	Mar	Apr	May	Jun	Jul	Aug	Sep	Oct	Nov	Dec	Year
Record high °C (°F)	17.9 (64.2)	23.1 (73.6)	30.9 (87.6)	32.5 (90.5)	34.0 (93.2)	35.0 (95.0)	36.4 (97.5)	36.1 (97.0)	34.9 (94.8)	29.3 (84.7)	24.4 (75.9)	18.8 (65.8)	36.4 (97.5)
Mean daily maximum °C (°F)	9.3 (48.7)	11.4 (52.5)	15.8 (60.4)	21.4 (70.5)	25.5 (77.9)	27.5 (81.5)	29.6 (85.3)	29.2 (84.6)	25.2 (77.4)	20.2 (68.4)	15.8 (60.4)	10.5 (50.9)	20.1 (68.2)
Daily mean °C (°F)	5.8 (42.4)	7.7 (45.9)	11.2 (52.2)	16.1 (61.0)	20.0 (68.0)	22.5 (72.5)	24.4 (75.9)	24.0 (75.2)	20.8 (69.4)	16.5 (61.7)	12.3 (54.1)	7.2 (45.0)	15.7 (60.3)
Mean daily minimum °C (°F)	3.2 (37.8)	5.0 (41.0)	7.9 (46.2)	12.4 (54.3)	16.3 (61.3)	19.3 (66.7)	21.2 (70.2)	20.8 (69.4)	18.2 (64.8)	14.3 (57.7)	10.0 (50.0)	4.9 (40.8)	12.8 (55.0)
Record low °C (°F)	−4.5 (23.9)	−2.0 (28.4)	−1.5 (29.3)	3.6 (38.5)	6.7 (44.1)	13.0 (55.4)	15.1 (59.2)	14.5 (58.1)	11.8 (53.2)	4.2 (39.6)	1.1 (34.0)	−4.2 (24.4)	−4.5 (23.9)
Average precipitation mm (inches)	12.2 (0.48)	20.0 (0.79)	44.4 (1.75)	77.7 (3.06)	110.8 (4.36)	148.7 (5.85)	254.1 (10.00)	284.8 (11.21)	155.9 (6.14)	69.9 (2.75)	32.8 (1.29)	10.8 (0.43)	1,222.1 (48.11)
Average precipitation days (≥ 0.1 mm)	10.9	12.3	15.9	16.9	18.5	20.2	20.1	19.0	21.0	20.5	12.5	9.8	197.6
Average snowy days	1.3	0.7	0	0	0	0	0	0	0	0	0	0.4	2.4
Average relative humidity (%)	84	83	82	81	80	83	85	86	86	86	85	85	84
Mean monthly sunshine hours	41.4	43.6	70.6	97.5	103.4	94.5	117.2	123.0	58.4	46.3	49.0	42.6	887.5
Percentage possible sunshine	13	14	19	25	24	22	27	30	16	13	16	14	19
Source: China Meteorological Administration
