= Dujiangyan =

Ancient irrigation system in Sichuan, China

UNESCO World Heritage Site
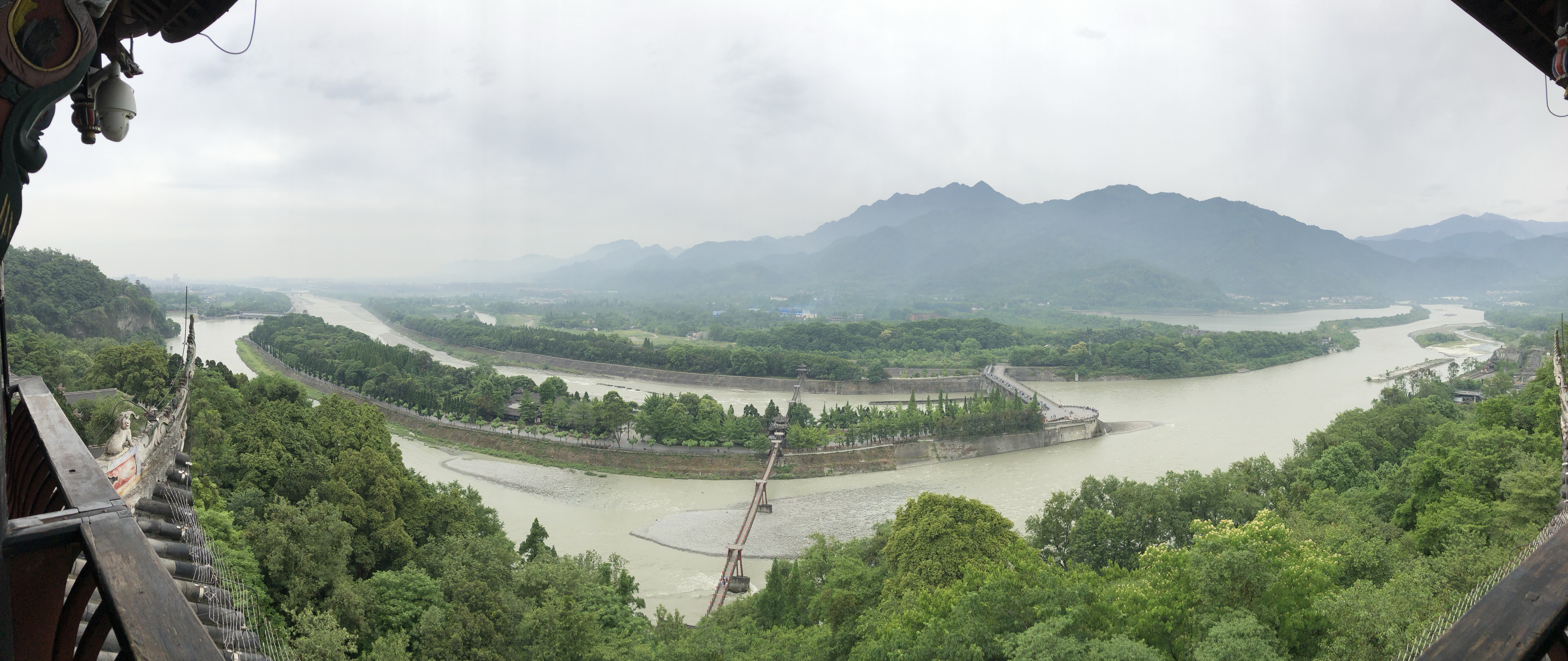
- Dujiangyan irrigation system

- Location within Sichuan Location within China
- Location: Dujiangyan City, Chengdu, Sichuan, China
- Part of: Mount Qingcheng and the Dujiangyan Irrigation System
- Criteria: Cultural: (ii)(iv)(vi)
- Reference: 1001
- Inscription: 2000 (24th Session)
- Coordinates: 31°0′6″N 103°36′19″E

The Dujiangyan (Chinese: 都江堰; pinyin: Dūjiāngyàn) is an ancient hydraulic engineering system in Dujiangyan City, Sichuan, China. Originally constructed around 256 BC by the State of Qin as an irrigation and flood control project, it is still in use today. The system's infrastructure develops on the Min River (Minjiang), one of the longest tributaries of the Yangtze. The area is in the west part of the Chengdu Plain, between the Sichuan Basin and the Tibetan Plateau.

Originally, the Min would rush down from the Min Mountains and slow down abruptly after reaching the Chengdu Plain, filling the watercourse with silt, thus making the nearby areas extremely prone to floods. King Zhao of Qin commissioned the project, and the construction of the Dujiangyan harnessed the river using a new method of channeling and dividing the water rather than simply damming it. The water management scheme is still in use today to irrigate over 5,300 km^{2} (2,000 sq mi) of land in the region and has produced comprehensive benefits in flood control, irrigation, water transport and general water consumption. Begun over 2,250 years ago, it now irrigates 668,700 hectares of farmland. The Dujiangyan, the Zhengguo Canal in Shaanxi and the Lingqu Canal in Guangxi are collectively known as the "three great hydraulic engineering projects of the Qin".

Dujiangyan Irrigation System was inscribed on the World Heritage List in 2000. It has also been declared a State Priority Protected Site, among the first batch of National Scenic Areas and Historical Sites, and a National ISO14000 Demonstration Area.

== History ==
=== Planning ===
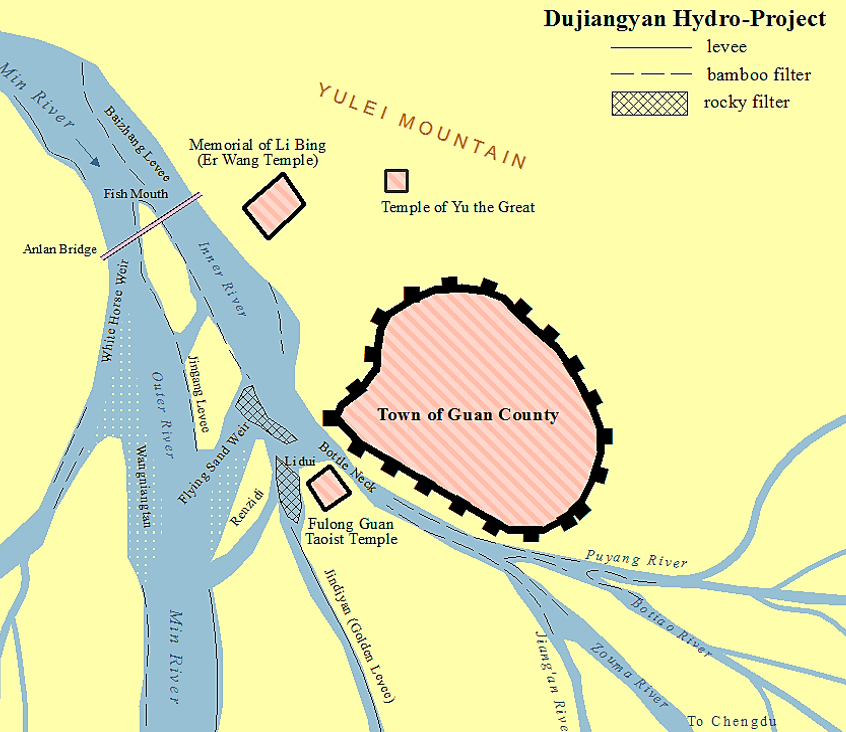
Map showing the plan of the Dujiangyan project

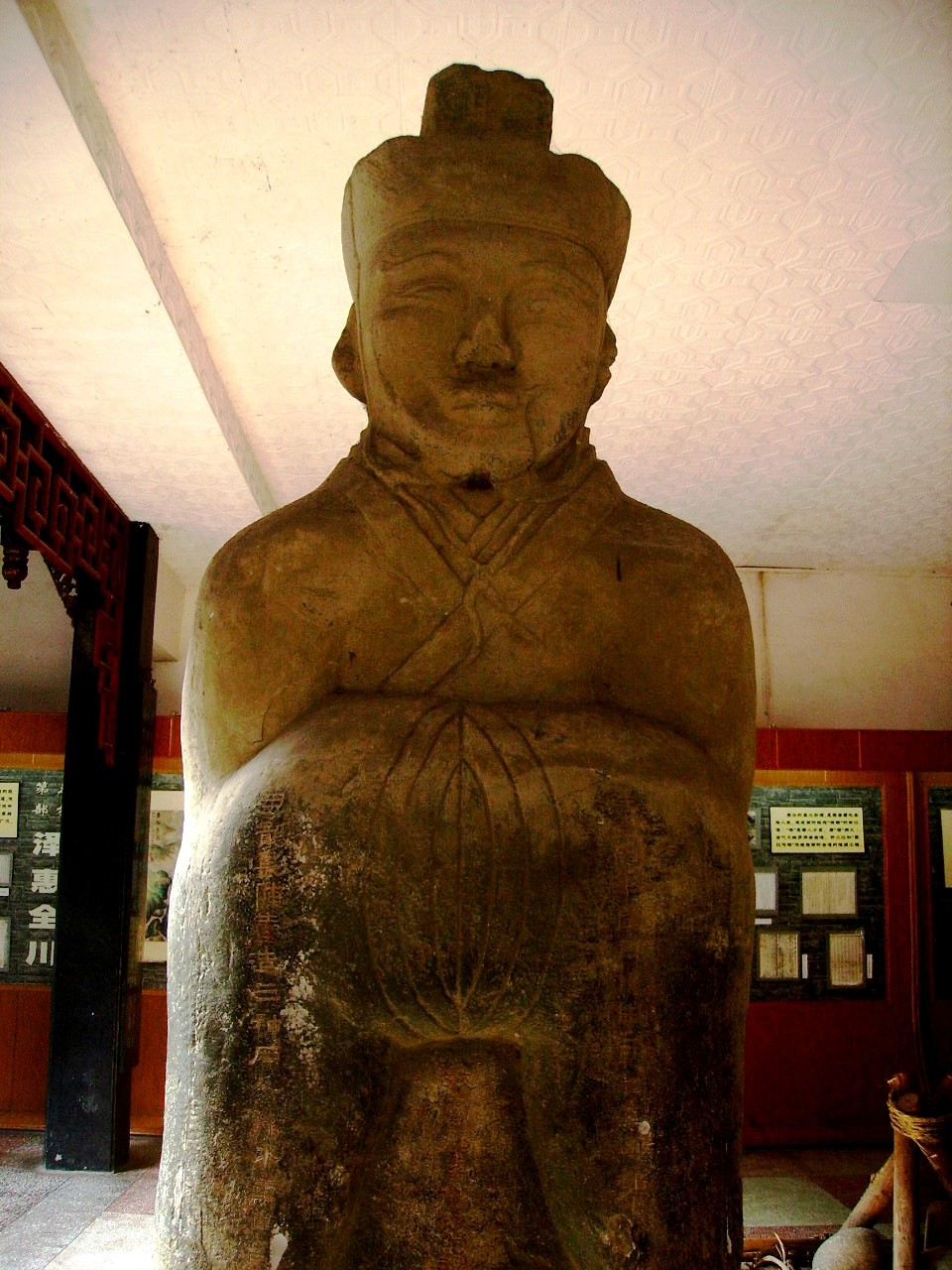
Eastern Han (25–220 CE) statue of Li Bing, the hydraulic engineer responsible for Dujiangyan

During the Warring States period, people who lived in the area of the Min River were plagued by annual flooding. Qin hydrologist Li Bing investigated the problem and discovered that the river was swelled by fast flowing spring melt-water from the local mountains that burst the banks when it reached the slow moving and heavily silted stretch below.

One solution would have been to build a dam, but the Qin wanted to keep the waterway open for military vessels to supply troops on the frontier, so instead an artificial levee was constructed to redirect a portion of the river's flow and then to cut a channel through Mount Yulei to discharge the excess water upon the dry Chengdu Plain beyond.

=== Construction ===
King Zhao of Qin allocated 100,000 taels of silver for the project and sent a team said to number tens of thousands. The levee was constructed from long sausage-shaped baskets of woven bamboo filled with stones known as Zhulong held in place by wooden tripods known as Macha. The construction of a water-diversion levee resembling a fish's mouth took four years to complete.

Cutting the channel proved to be a far greater problem, as the hand tools available at the time, prior to the invention of gunpowder, would have taken decades to cut through the mountain. Li Bing devised an ingenious method of using fire and water to rapidly heat and cool the rocks, causing them to crack and allowing them to be easily removed. After eight years of work, a channel 20 meters (66 ft) wide had been gouged through the mountain.

=== Legacy ===
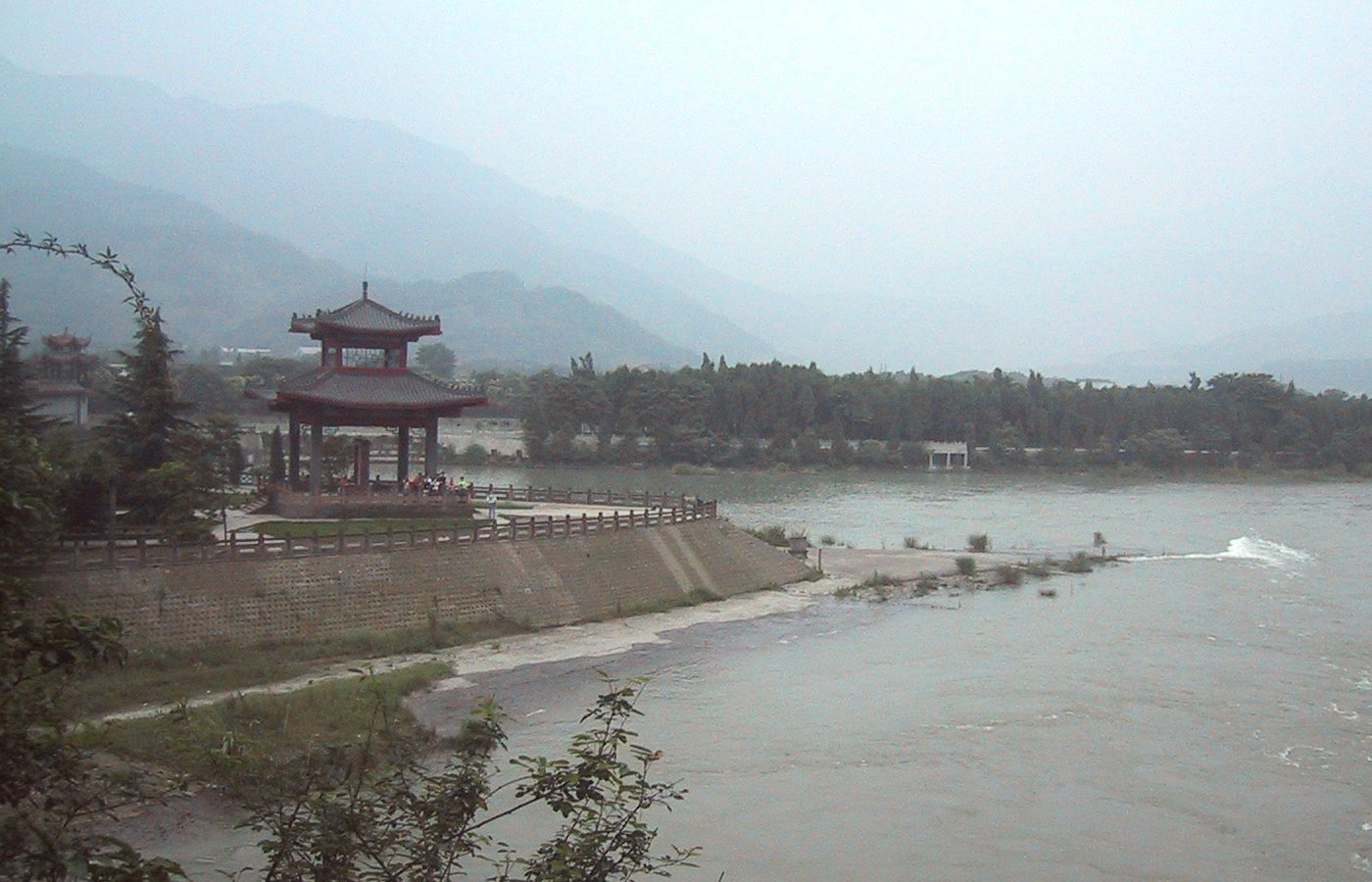
Dujiangyan

After the system was finished, no more floods occurred. The irrigation made Sichuan the most productive agricultural region in China for a time. The construction is also credited with giving the people of the region a laid-back attitude to life; by eliminating disaster and ensuring a regular and bountiful harvest, it left them with plenty of free time.

Turmoil surrounding the conquering of Chengdu by peasant rebel leader Zhang Xianzhong in 1644, and the Ming-Qing transition more generally, led to depopulation and the deterioration of the Dujiangyan irrigation system to the point where rice cultivation was set back for decades. The original Dujiangyan irrigation system was destroyed by the 1933 Diexi earthquake. The current Dujiangyan irrigation system was rebuilt after the Diexi earthquake in 1933 by Zhang Yuan (张沅) and his sons, including Zhang Shiling (张世龄).

In 2000, Dujiangyan became a UNESCO World Heritage Site. Today it has become a major tourist attraction.

=== 2008 Sichuan earthquake ===
On May 12, 2008, a massive earthquake struck a vast portion of west Sichuan, including the Dujiangyan area. Initial reports indicated that the Yuzui Levee was cracked but not severely damaged. Diversion of flow could still be seen as the river turns.

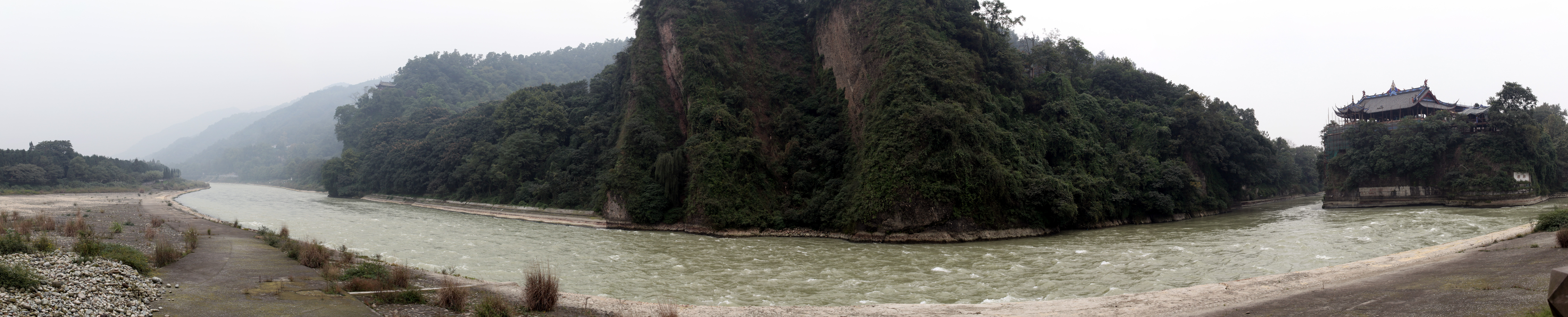
Panorama of Inner Stream

== Engineering constructions ==
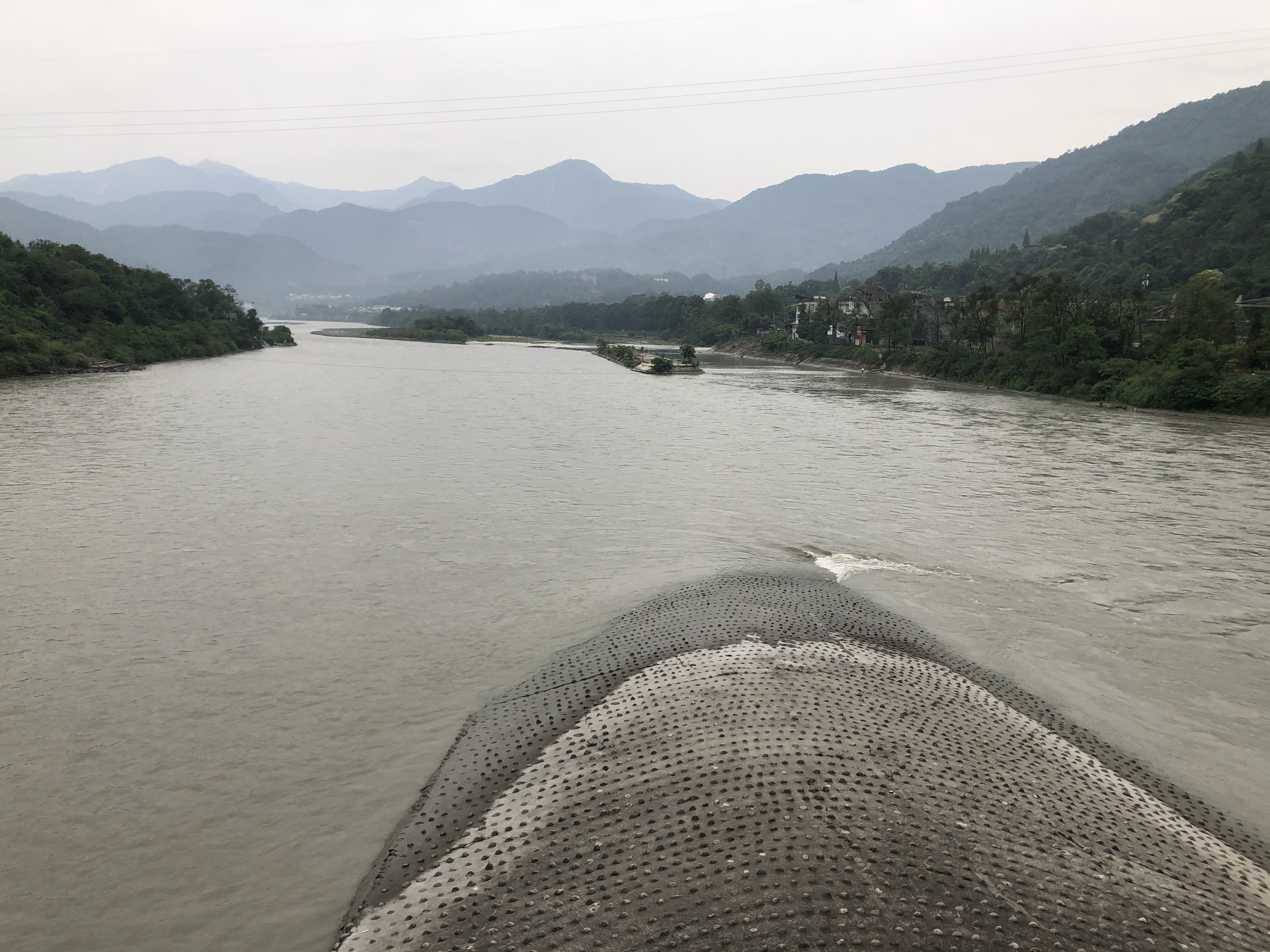
Fish Mouth Levee

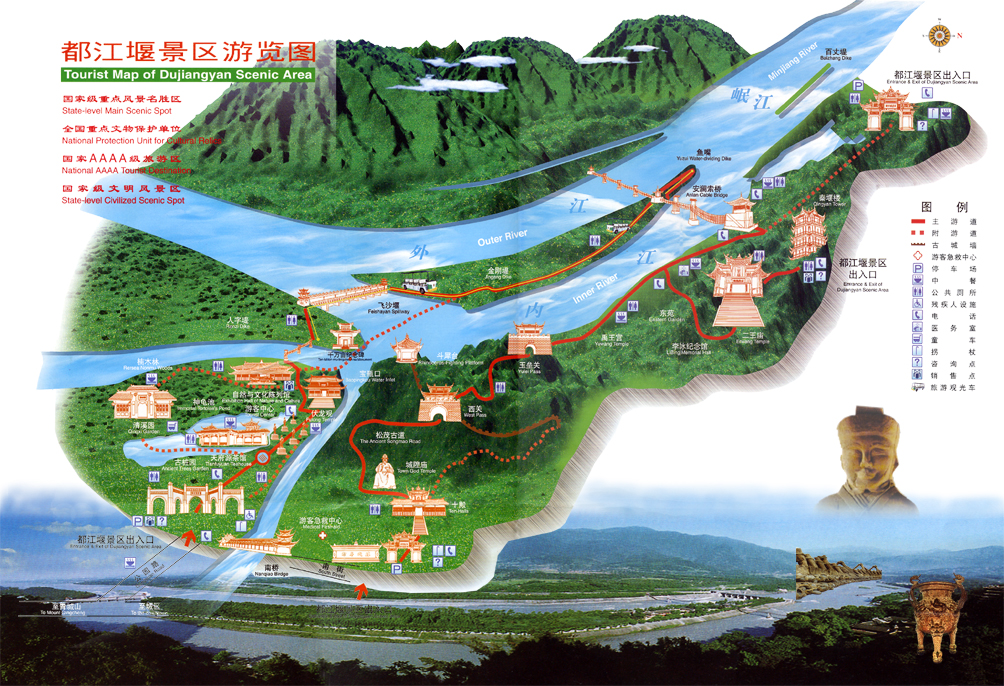
Waterways map

=== Irrigation head ===
The irrigation system consists of three main constructions that work in harmony with one another to ensure against flooding and keep the fields well supplied with water:

The Yuzui or Fish Mouth Levee (Chinese: 鱼嘴), named for its conical head that is said to resemble the mouth of a fish, is the key part of the construction. It is an artificial levee that divides the water into inner and outer streams. The inner stream is deep and narrow, while the outer stream is relatively shallow but wide. This special structure ensures that the inner stream carries approximately 60% of the river's flow into the irrigation system during dry season. While during flood, this amount decreases to 40% to protect the people from flooding. The outer stream drains away the rest, flushing out much of the silt and sediment.

The Feishayan or Flying Sand Weir (Chinese: 飞沙堰) has a 200-meter (660 ft)-wide opening that connects the inner and outer streams. This ensures against flooding by allowing the natural swirling flow of the water to drain out excess water from the inner to the outer stream. The swirl also drains out silt and sediment that failed to go into the outer stream. A modern reinforced concrete weir has replaced the original weighted bamboo baskets.

The Baopingkou or Bottle-Neck Channel (Chinese: 宝瓶口), which was gouged through the mountain, is the final part of the system. The channel distributes the water to the farmlands in the Chengdu Plain, whilst the narrow entrance, that gives it its name, works as a check gate, creating the whirlpool flow that carries away the excess water over Flying Sand Fence, to ensure against flooding.

=== Anlan Suspension Bridge ===
Anlan or Couple's Bridge spans the full width of the river connecting the artificial island to both banks and is known as one of the Five Ancient Bridges of China. The original Zhupu Bridge only spanned the inner stream connecting the levee to the foot of Mount Yulei. This was replaced in the Song dynasty by Pingshi Bridge which was burned down during the wars that marked the end of the Ming dynasty.

In 1803 during the Qing dynasty a local man named He Xiande and his wife proposed the construction of a replacement, made of wooden plates and bamboo handrails, to span both streams and this was nicknamed Couple's Bridge in their honour. This was demolished in the 1970s and replaced by a modern bridge.

== Geography ==
=== Location ===
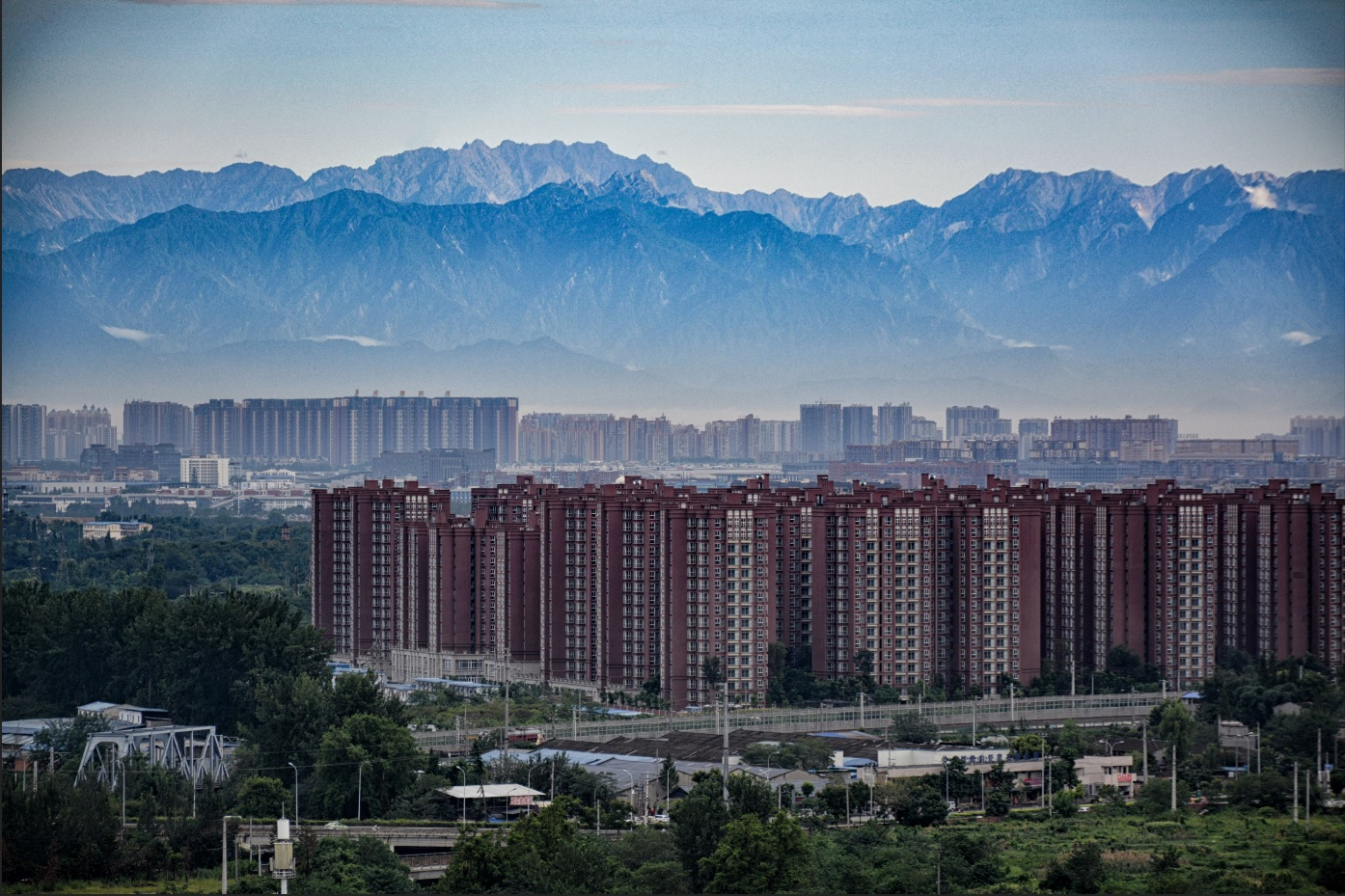
Longmen Mountains, located on the northwest edge of Sichuan Basin

The Dujiangyan irrigation system is located in the western portion of the Chengdu flatlands, at the junction between the Sichuan basin and the Qinghai-Tibet plateau.

=== Geology ===
The Dujiangyan irrigation system is located at the turning point of the two topographic steps of the western plateau mountains and the Chengdu Plain. It is the southwest extension of the Longmen Mountains and the area through which the Longmen Mountain Fault Zone passes.

=== Topography and geomorphology ===
The Dujiangyan irrigation system is higher in the northwest and lower in the southeast. The west belongs to the southern section of Longmen Mountains, with the mountain elevation below 3000 meters. The east is Chengdu Plain, with an altitude of 720 meters.

=== Hydrology ===
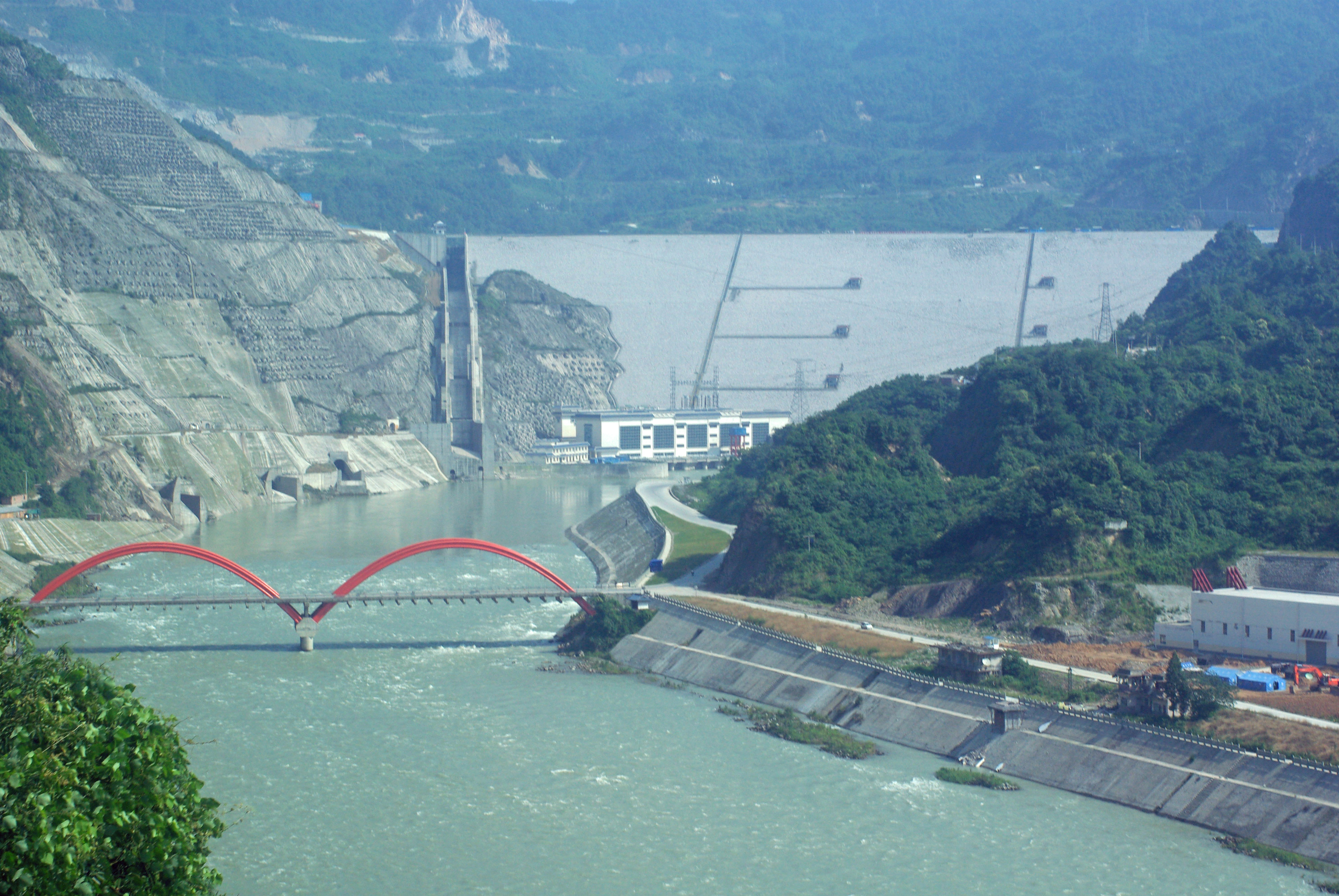
Zipingpu Dam North of Dujiangyan

The Dujiangyan irrigation system was built at the entrance of Minjiang River, with an average annual inflow of 15.082 billion cubic meters. There are two hydrological stations in the upper reaches of the Minjiang River. One is the Zipingpu Dam at the mouth of the main stream. The water catchment area of the control survey is 22664 square kilometers, accounting for 98.38% of the total water catchment area of the upper reaches of the Minjiang River. The other is Yangliuping Dam at the outlet of Baisha River, with a controlled catchment area of 363 square kilometers, accounting for 1.58% of the total catchment area. There is a catchment area of 10 square kilometers from Estuary of Baisha River to Dujiangyan irrigation system, accounting for 0.04% of the total catchment area.

== Temple sites ==
=== Two Kings Temple ===
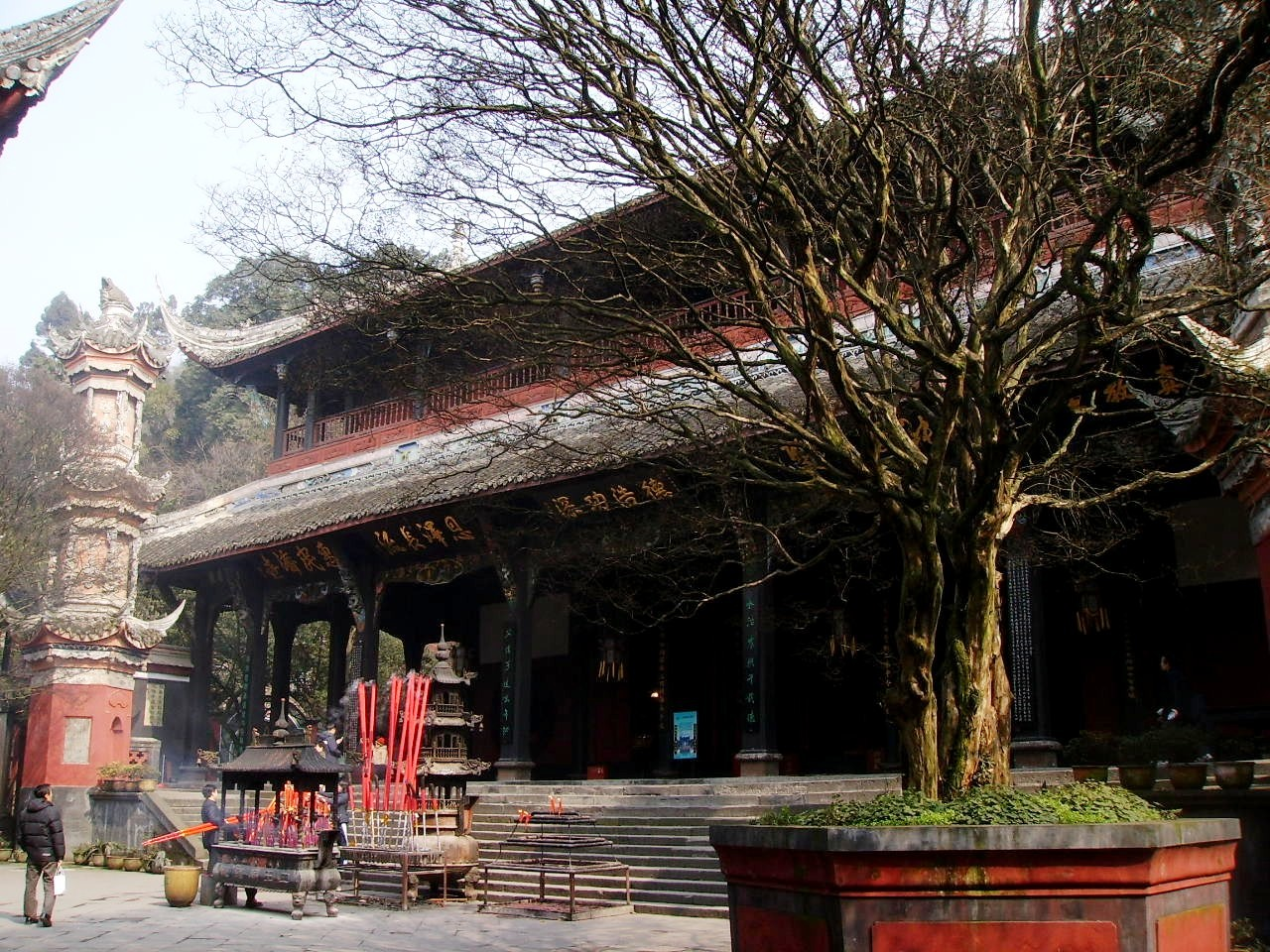
The Erwang Temple at Dujiangyan

Erwang or Two Kings Temple is on the bank of the river at the foot of Mount Yulei. The original Wangdi Temple built in memory of an ancient Shu king was moved, so locals renamed the temple here.

The 10,072 m^{2} Qing dynasty wooden complex conforms to the traditional standard of temple design except that it does not follow a north–south axis. The main hall, which contains a modern statue of Li Bing, opens up onto a courtyard facing an opera stage. On Li Bing's traditional birthday, 24th day of the 7th month of the lunar calendar, local operas were performed for the public, and on Tomb Sweeping Day a Water Throwing Festival is held.

The rear hall contains a modern statue of the god Erlang Shen. Because it would be a problem if a family had no offspring in Chinese feudal society, locals regarded this Erlang as Li Bing's son. Guanlantin Pavilion stands above the complex and is inscribed with wise words from Li Bing such as, When the river flows in zigzags, cut a straight channel; when the riverbed is wide and shallow, dig it deeper.

=== Dragon-Taming Temple ===
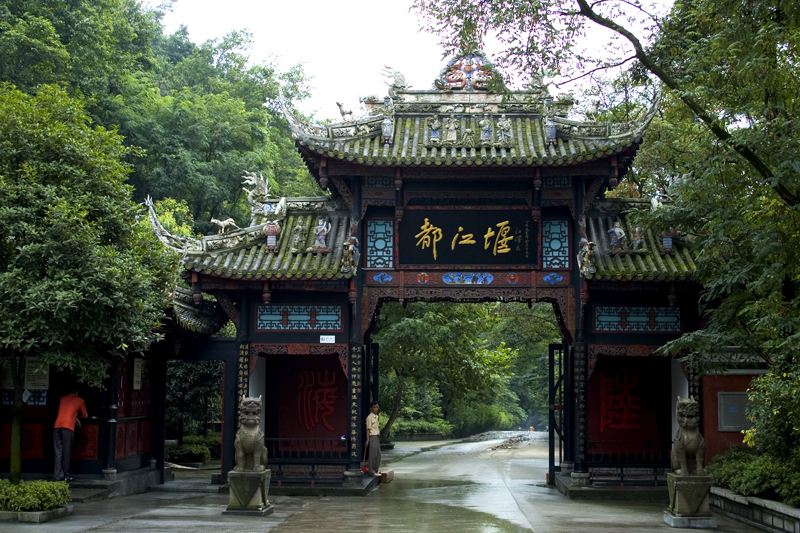
A paifang in Dujiangyan

Fulongguan or Dragon-Taming Temple in Lidui Park was founded in the third century in honour of Fan Changsheng. Following Li Bing's death a hall was established here in his honour and the temple was renamed to commemorate the dragon fighting legends that surrounded him. It is here that Erlang Shen, the legendary son of Li Bing, is said to have chained the dragon that he and his seven sworn brothers had captured in an ambush at the River God Temple when it came to collect a human sacrifice. This action is said to have protected the region from floods ever since.

During the East Han dynasty a statue of Li Bing was placed in the river to monitor the water flow, with the level rising above his shoulders to indicate flood and falling beneath his calves to indicate drought. Recovered from the river in 1974 and placed on display in the main hall, this is the oldest known stone statue of a human in China.

== See also ==
- Turfan water system
- Grand Canal of China
