= Longmen Mountains =

Mountain range in Sichuan province

Longmen Range
- 龍門山
- Location within China

Highest point
- Elevation: 4,984 m (16,352 ft)
- Coordinates: 32°10′N 104°54′E

Geography
- Location: Sichuan, China

The Longmen Mountains (simplified Chinese: 龙门山; traditional Chinese: 龍門山; pinyin: Lóngmén Shān; lit. 'Dragon's Gate Mountains'), also tautologically referred to in English-language publications as the Longmenshan Mountains, are a mountain range in Sichuan province in southwestern China.

== Geography ==
The range runs in a roughly northeast to southwest direction, roughly from Guangyuan near the province's northeastern border, to the western part of the Chengdu Prefecture, in the central part of the province, where it approaches the southern end of the Qionglai Range. The Longmen Mountains form the northwestern rim of the Sichuan basin.

The uplift of the Longmen Mountains is a result of vertical slippage on the Longmenshan Fault. The Longmen Mountains represent the eastern rim of the immense Tibetan Plateau.

Some maps use the name "Longmen Mountains" only for the northeastern section of the range, while the taller southwestern section is labeled Chaping Mountains (Chinese: 茶坪山; pinyin: Chápíng shān).

The range's highest point is Mt. Jiudeng or Jiudengshan (Chinese: 九顶山; pinyin: jiǔdǐng shān; lit. 'Nine-Peak Mountain'), at 4,984 m (16,352 ft) above sea level.
