= List of universities and colleges in Sichuan =

The following is a list of universities and colleges in Sichuan.

== Public ==
- Sichuan University (四川大学, Chengdu) - Double First Class University Plan
- University of Electronic Science and Technology of China (电子科技大学, Chengdu) - Double First Class University Plan
- Southwest Jiaotong University (西南交通大学, Chengdu) - Double First Class University Plan
- Southwestern University of Finance and Economics (西南财经大学, Chengdu) - Double First Class University Plan
- Chengdu University of Technology (成都理工大学, Chengdu) - Double First Class University Plan
- Sichuan Agricultural University (四川农业大学, Yaan) - Double First Class University Plan
- Southwest Petroleum University (西南石油大学, Chengdu, Nanchong) - Double First Class University Plan
- Chengdu University of Traditional Chinese Medicine (成都中医药大学, Chengdu) - Double First Class University Plan
- Southwest University for Nationalities (西南民族大学, Chengdu)
- Civil Aviation Flight University of China (中国民用航空飞行学院, Guanghan)
- Sichuan Normal University (四川师范大学, Chengdu)
- Chengdu University of Information Technology (成都信息工程大学, Chengdu)
- Xihua University (西华大学, Chengdu)
- Southwest Medical University (西南医科大学，Luzhou)
- China West Normal University (西华师范大学, Nanchong)
- Chengdu Normal University (成都师范学院, Chengdu)
- Chengdu Industrial Institute (成都工业学院, Chengdu)
- North Sichuan Medical College (川北医学院, Nanchong)
- Aba Teachers University (阿坝师范学院, Ngawa Tibetan and Qiang Autonomous Prefecture)
- Yibin University (宜宾学院, Yibin)

== Private ==
- Chengdu Neusoft University (成都东软学院, Chengdu)
- Geely University of China (吉利学院, Chengdu)
- Sichuan University of Media and Communications (四川传媒学院, Chengdu)
- Chengdu College of Arts and Sciences (成都文理学院, Chengdu)
- Sichuan University of Culture and Arts (四川文化艺术学院, Mianyang)
- Sichuan Institute of Industrial Science and technology (四川工业科技学院, Deyang)
- Sichuan Film and Television University (四川电影电视学院, Chengdu)
- Sichuan Technology and Business University (四川工商学院, Chengdu)
- Chengdu Jincheng College (成都锦城学院, Chengdu)
- Gingko Hospitality Management College (成都银杏酒店管理学院, Chengdu)

== Independent institution ==
- Sichuan University Jinjiang College (四川大学锦江学院, Meishan)
- Chengdu College of University of Electronic Science and Technology of China (电子科技大学成都学院, Chengdu)
- Tianfu College of Southwestern University of Finance and Economics (西南财经大学天府学院, Mianyang, Chengdu)
- The Engineering & Technical College of Chengdu University of Technology (成都理工大学工程技术学院, Leshan)
- Chengdu Institute Sichuan International Studies University (四川外国语大学成都学院, Chengdu)
- City College, Southwest University of Science and Technology (西南科技大学城市学院, Mianyang)
- Southwest Jiaotong University Hope College (西南交通大学希望学院, Nanchong, Chengdu)
