= Duojia Pan =

Chinese-American developmental biologist

Duojia Pan (Chinese: 潘多加) is a Chinese-American developmental biologist at the University of Texas Southwestern Medical Center, where he is Fouad A. and Val Imm Bashour Distinguished Professor of Physiology, chairman of the department of physiology, and investigator of the Howard Hughes Medical Institute (HHMI). His research is focused on molecular mechanisms of growth control and tissue homeostasis and their implications in human disease.

== Biography ==
Pan was born in Nanchong, Sichuan, China. After graduating from Nanchong Senior High School, Pan attended Peking University and received a bachelor's degree in biochemistry in 1988. Through the China-United States Biochemistry Examination and Application (CUSBEA) program, Pan moved to the U.S. in 1989 and pursued Ph.D. studies in transcriptional regulation in the laboratory of Albert Courey at University of California, Los Angeles. From 1993 to 1998, Pan conducted postdoctoral research in developmental genetics at University of California, Berkeley under the mentorship of Gerald Rubin, supported by a Jane Coffin Childs Postdoctoral Fellowship. In 1998, Pan established his laboratory as an assistant professor of physiology at the University of Texas Southwestern Medical Center. He was recruited to the department of molecular biology and genetics at Johns Hopkins University School of Medicine in 2004, where he became an Howard Hughes Medical Investigator (2008), a Fellow of the American Association for the Advancement of Science (2012), and received the Paul Marks Prize for Cancer Research (2013). In 2016, Pan returned to UT Southwestern Medical Center as chair of the department of physiology. He received the Passano Award from Passano Foundation in 2022 and was elected to the National Academy of Sciences in 2023.

== Research ==
Pan is best known for his pioneering work elucidating the Hippo signaling pathway, an evolutionarily conserved signaling pathway that regulates tissue growth in development, tumorigenesis and regeneration. Using fruit fly (Drosophila melanogaster) and mouse (Mus musculus) as experimental models, his laboratory systematically decoded the key molecular events in the Hippo pathway, including its core kinase cascade, downstream transcriptional machinery and key upstream regulators. In particular, Pan identified Drosophila Yorkie and its mammalian homologue YAP as the nuclear effector of the Hippo pathway, and elucidated the biological function of Yorkie/YAP as key regulators of developmental and regenerative tissue growth as well as potent oncoproteins driving tumor growth.

Besides the Hippo pathway, Pan also contributed to the understanding of other developmental signaling pathways. As a postdoctoral fellow, Pan identified cAMP-dependent protein kinase (PKA) as a mediator of Hedgehog signaling and Kuzbanian (ADAM10) as a transmembrane metalloprotease responsible for the proteolytic cleavage and activation of the cell-surface receptor Notch. Early studies from his laboratory at UT Southwestern uncovered the molecular function of Tsc1 and Tsc2 by linking these tumor suppressor genes to Rheb and mTOR signaling. This discovery provided the molecular basis for using mTOR inhibitors in the treatment of tuberous sclerosis.
