= Yibin Caiba Airport =

Airport in People's Republic of China

Yibin Caiba Airport 宜宾菜坝机场
- IATA: YBP; ICAO: ZUYB

Summary
- Airport type: Military (former public)
- Serves: Yibin, Sichuan, China
- Location: Caiba, Cuiping District
- Opened: 16 December 1992
- Closed: 4 December 2019
- Coordinates: 28°48′1″N 104°32′40″E

Map
- Location of the airport Caiba Airport (China)

Runways
Direction	Length		Surface
Direction	m	ft	Surface
08/26	2,150	7,054

Statistics (2018)
- Passengers: 974,810
- Aircraft movements: 9,633
- Cargo (metric tons): 3,225.1
- Source: List of the busiest airports in the People's Republic of China

Yibin Caiba Airport (Chinese: 宜宾菜坝机场) is a military and former public airport in the city of Yibin in southern Sichuan province of China. Located in the town of Caiba in Cuiping District, the airport was opened on 16 December 1992.

In 2011 Yibin Caiba Airport served 326,000 passengers, a 12.4% increase over the previous year, and 2,737.6 tons of cargo. As the airport's location limited its capability to expand, in May 2012 the State Council of China approved the building of the new Yibin Wuliangye Airport to replace Caiba Airport.

Caiba Airport served its last civil flight in the evening of 4 December 2019, and all commercial operations were then transferred to Wuliangye Airport, which opened the following day. As the military facilities of the new airport are still under construction, Caiba is expected to continue serving as a military airbase for approximately another year, and will then be completely closed.

== See also ==
- List of airports in China
- List of the busiest airports in China
- List of People's Liberation Army Air Force airbases
