= Nanchong Senior High School =

Public school in Sichuan Province, China

- Nanchong, Scichuan, China

Information
- Type: Public
- Motto: 弘扬诚勇，追求卓越 (Inspire Honor and Courage, Pursue Excellence)
- Founded: October 29, 1927
- Founders: Wu Yuzhang，Zhang Lan
- Principal: Tu Gang (涂刚)
- Faculty: 1185
- Enrollment: 18154
- Campuses: Shunqing, Jialing, Gaoping, Linjiang, and Wenfeng
- Campus: 184 Acres
- Color: Purple
- Song: Nanchong Senior High School Anthem
- Website: https://www.scncgz.net

Nanchong Senior High School (四川省南充高级中学) is a public high school in Nanchong City, Sichuan Province. The school comprises five campuses—Shunqing, Jialing, Gaoping, Linjiang, and Wenfeng—covering approximately 184 acres. The school has 1,336 staff members, including 406 with senior titles, and 34% of the teachers hold graduate-level qualifications.

It is considered among the best schools in Sichuan and has been classified as a "National Model High School" and "First-Class Model High School", and "First-Class Demonstration Senior High School (Leading Type)" by the Sichuan Provincial Government.

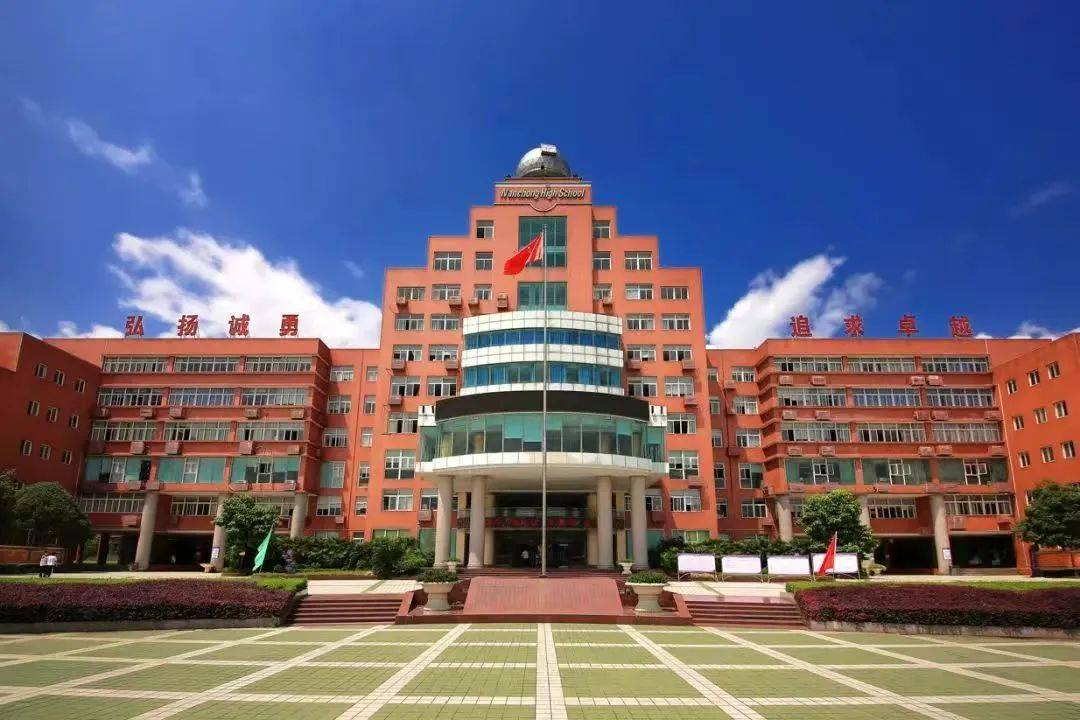

== History ==
Nanchong Senior High School was founded in 1927 by Yuzhang Wu, a revolutionary and linguist of the proletariat class in the People's Republic of China.

In 1950, it merged with Jianhua Middle School, a private school established by Lan Zhang, a democratic revolutionary, educator, and one of the national leaders of the People's Republic of China.

In 1952, the Sichuan Provincial Government officially named it Sichuan Nanchong Senior High School.

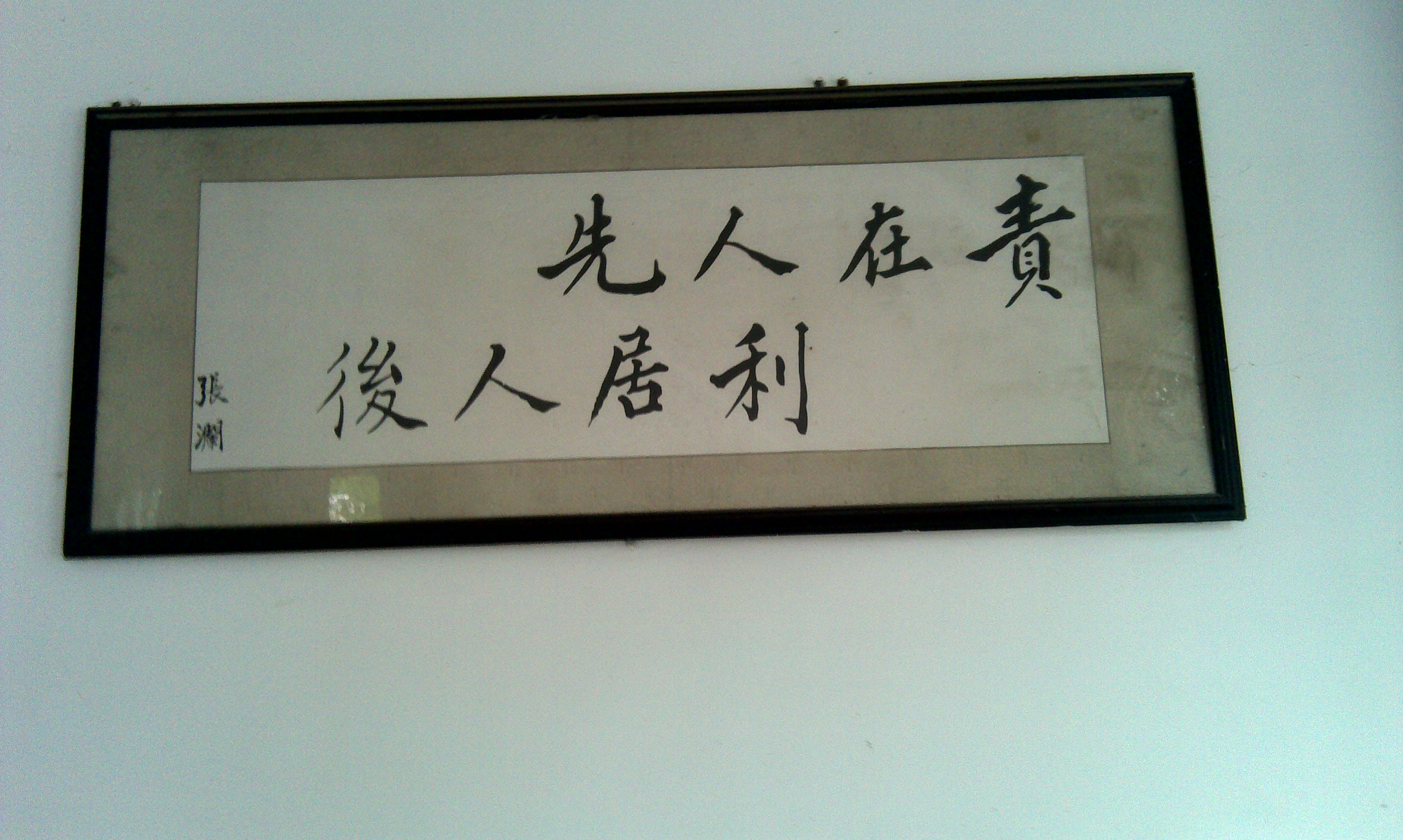
“Responsibility comes first, benefit comes later,” by Lan Zhan

== Rankings and awards ==
Based on the annual college entrance examination admission rate, teaching quality, and student quality evaluation published by the Nanchong Municipal Government Education Department, Nanchong Senior High School has led in teaching quality in Nanchong City for 32 years, since 1993.

According to the biennial 'Top 100 High Schools in China' rankings, Nanchong Senior High School was included among the top 100 in 2009, 2017, and 2022. This ranking has, however, faced some controversy due to differences in evaluation criteria compared to the traditional emphasis on college entrance exam results.

The campus expanded and increased enrollment after 2019, strengthening the region's educational capacity and enhancing its influence within the province. There are concerns that this growth may have diluted the school's core quality resources and lowered the admissions threshold. While the school remains a leading institution in the Nanchong area, a decline in provincial high-achiever exam results (e.g., fewer high scorers on the national college entrance examination since 2022) appears to lend some credence to these concerns. Additionally, the school's large intake of top students has raised concerns in the community about limiting opportunities for other schools, potentially fostering a monopoly.

The school has also recruited teachers from across the country to strengthen its faculty.

== Campus culture ==
Nanchong Senior High School prioritizes students' mental health and well-rounded personal development. Since it was founded in 1927 the school aims to cultivate well-rounded individuals with strong character.

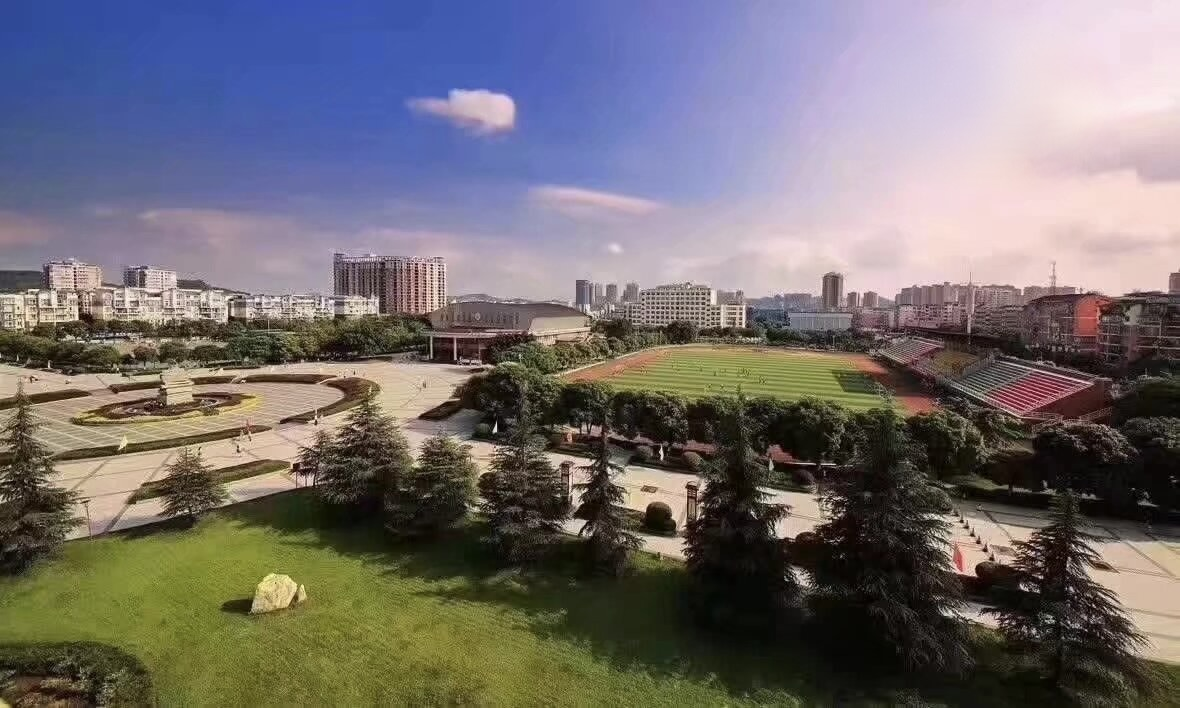

=== Motto ===
==== "Inspire Honor and Courage, Pursue Excellence."（"弘扬诚勇，追求卓越"） ====
In 1927 Yuzhang Wu founded Jialing Senior High Schoo. He selected "Sincerity and Courage" as the school motto. The motto draws from The Book of Rites: Doctrine of the Mean, which states, "Sincerity is the way of heaven; pursuing sincerity is the way of man." Yuzhang Wu believed that "sincerity" is an attribute of heaven. Similarly "courage" embodies resilience and fearlessness."

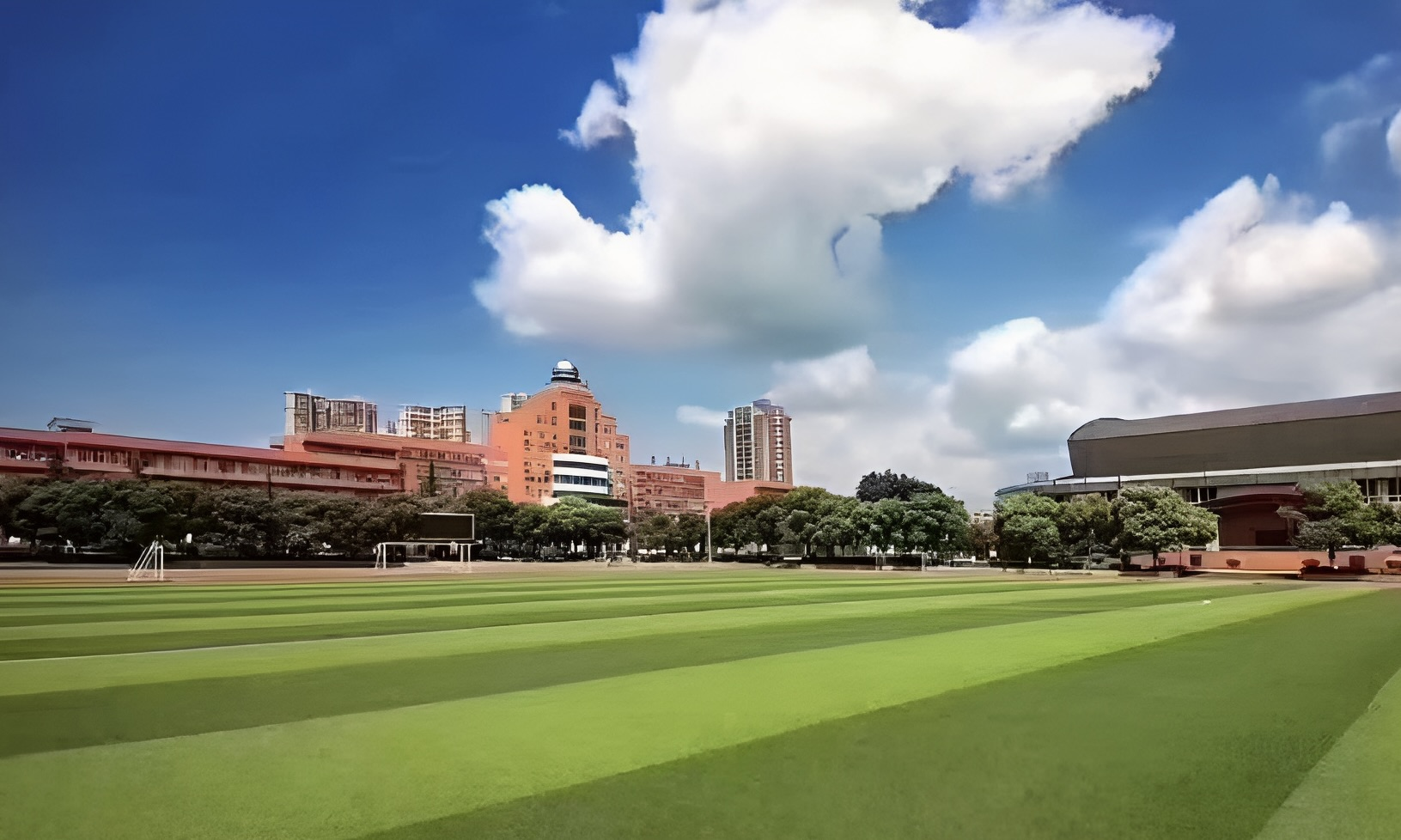

=== Student's Organisations ===
There are many tudent clubs, including Broadcasting, Etiquette, Debate, Art, Folk Art Appreciation, Photography, Literature, Dance, Drama, Choir, Folk Performance, and Calligraphy clubs, and others.

There are also after school club activities, which include experiences like outdoor sketching, crafting, broadcasting, volunteer etiquette services for new students, and performances at cultural showcases.

== Notable alumni ==
- Duojia Pan (潘多加), biologist, a student of Nanchong Senior High School in 1984, member of the National Academy of Sciences of the United States (2023).
- Rongjun Shen (沈荣骏), lieutenant General, Academician of the Chinese Academy of Engineering.
- Yongchuan Chen (陈永川), mathematician, academician of the Chinese Academy of Sciences.
- Ji Xin (邢继), deputy general manager, chief engineer, and chief designer of Hualong One, China Nuclear Power Engineering Co., Ltd.

{{coord missing|China}}
