= GPQ =

GPQ may refer to:

- Green Party of Quebec, provincial political party in Canada
- GPQ, division code for Gaoping, Nanchong, Sichuan, China
- Groupe parlementaire québécois, former name of the Québec debout, Canadian political party
