= Bashur (disambiguation) =

Bashur may refer to:

== Place names ==
- Bashur or Başûr, the Iraqi Kurdistan or Southern Kurdistan (Kurdish: باشووری کوردستان, romanized: Başûrê Kurdistanê)
- Harir Air Base, a military airfield located near to the town of Harir, in the Erbil Governorate, Kurdistan Region, Iraq, previously known as Bashur Air Base

== Surname ==
- Zerefeh Bashur (1884-1968), the first female licensed physician in the Levant.
