= Miaozhuang Wang =

Legendary father of Guanyin Bodhisattva

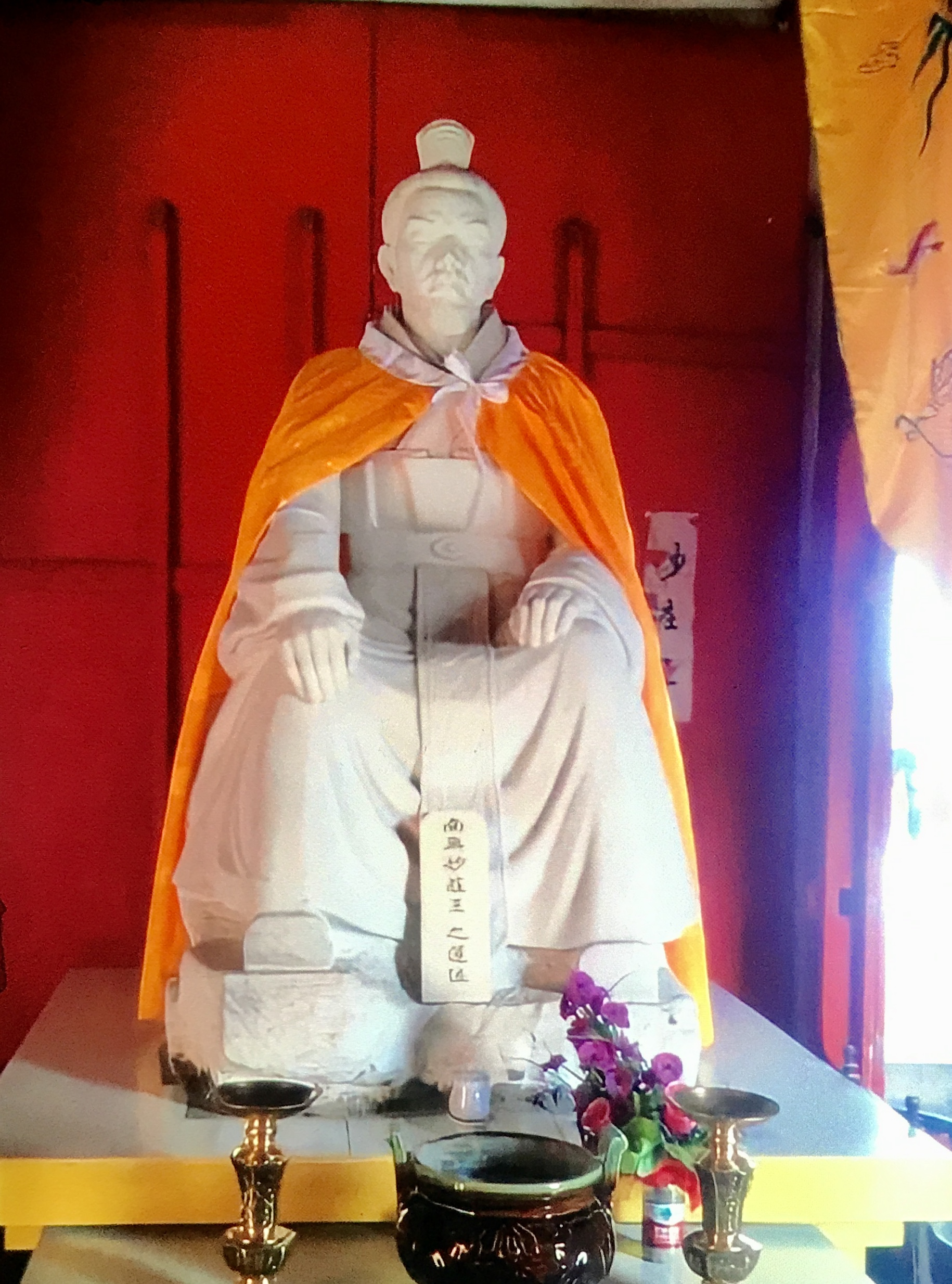
Statue of Miaozhuang Wang

Miaozhuang Wang (Chinese: 妙庄王; also known as Miaozhuangyan) is a Chinese deity and the father of the Guanyin Bodhisattva, also known as the Goddess of Mercy. Miaozhuang was the ruler of Fucheng Kingdom (now Lizhuang Township) in the 6th century B.C.

== Legend ==
According to legend, Miaozhuang Wang had three daughters, the youngest of whom was Princess Miao Shan. When Miaozhuang asked Miao Shan to marry a wealthy man, the princess agreed to obey her father's command as long as the marriage eased the "Three Misfortunes."

Miaozhuang did not understand what Miao Shan meant, and asked his daughter to explain. Miao Shan told her father that the First Misfortune was the suffering endured by people as they aged; the Second Misfortune was the suffering caused by illness; and the Third Misfortune was the suffering caused by death. If the marriage could not ease these misfortunes, then Miao Shan said she would rather live a solitary monastic life in the temple.

Miaozhuang asked Miao Shan if she knew a man who could ease these misfortunes, and Miao Shan pointed out that a doctor could do all of these. Miaozhuang grew angry because he wanted Miao Shan to marry a person of power and wealth, not a healer. In an attempt to change Miao Shan's mind, Miaozhuang forced her into hard labor and with little to eat or drink.

Every day she begged to be able to enter a temple and become a nun instead of marrying. Miaozhuang Wang eventually allowed her to work in the temple, but asked the monks to give her the toughest chores so as to discourage her. The monks forced Miaoshan to work all day and all night while others slept. However, she was such a good person that the animals living around the temple began to help her with her chores. Her father, seeing this, became so frustrated that he attempted to burn down the temple. Miaoshan put out the fire with her bare hands and suffered no burns. Now struck with fear, her father ordered her to be put to death.

The legend of Miaoshan usually ends with Miaozhuang Wang falling ill with jaundice, which no physician could cure. A monk appeared saying that jaundice could be cured by making a medicine out of the arm and eye of one without anger. The monk further suggested that such a person was working in the temple: his daughter. When asked, Miaoshan willingly offered up her eyes and arms for her father; this indeed cured Wang of his illnesses. Not knowing that it was his daughter who made the sacrifice for him, he went to the temple to thank the donor. When he discovered that it was his daughter, he was struck with shame and begged her for forgiveness. The story concludes with Miaoshan being transformed into the Thousand-Armed Guanyin, and the king, queen and her two sisters building a temple on the mountain in her honor. She is believed to have been reincarnated as bodhisattva Avalokiteśvara.

== Temple ==
Located in Nanchong, there is a temple called Qile Temple (栖乐寺) is dedicated to Miaozhuang Wang. The temple was built during the Tang dynasty and destroyed in the Cultural Revolution.

In 2001, the Nanchong Municipal People's Government decided to restore Qile Temple as an open Buddhist monastery for Hongzong's performance to recreate the ancient temple style. The management committee of the monastery decided to rebuild the temple of King Miao Zhuang to meet the wishes of the majority of believers.
