= Yibin Wuliangye Airport =

Airport serving Yibin, Sichuan, China

Yibin Wuliangye Airport 宜宾五粮液机场
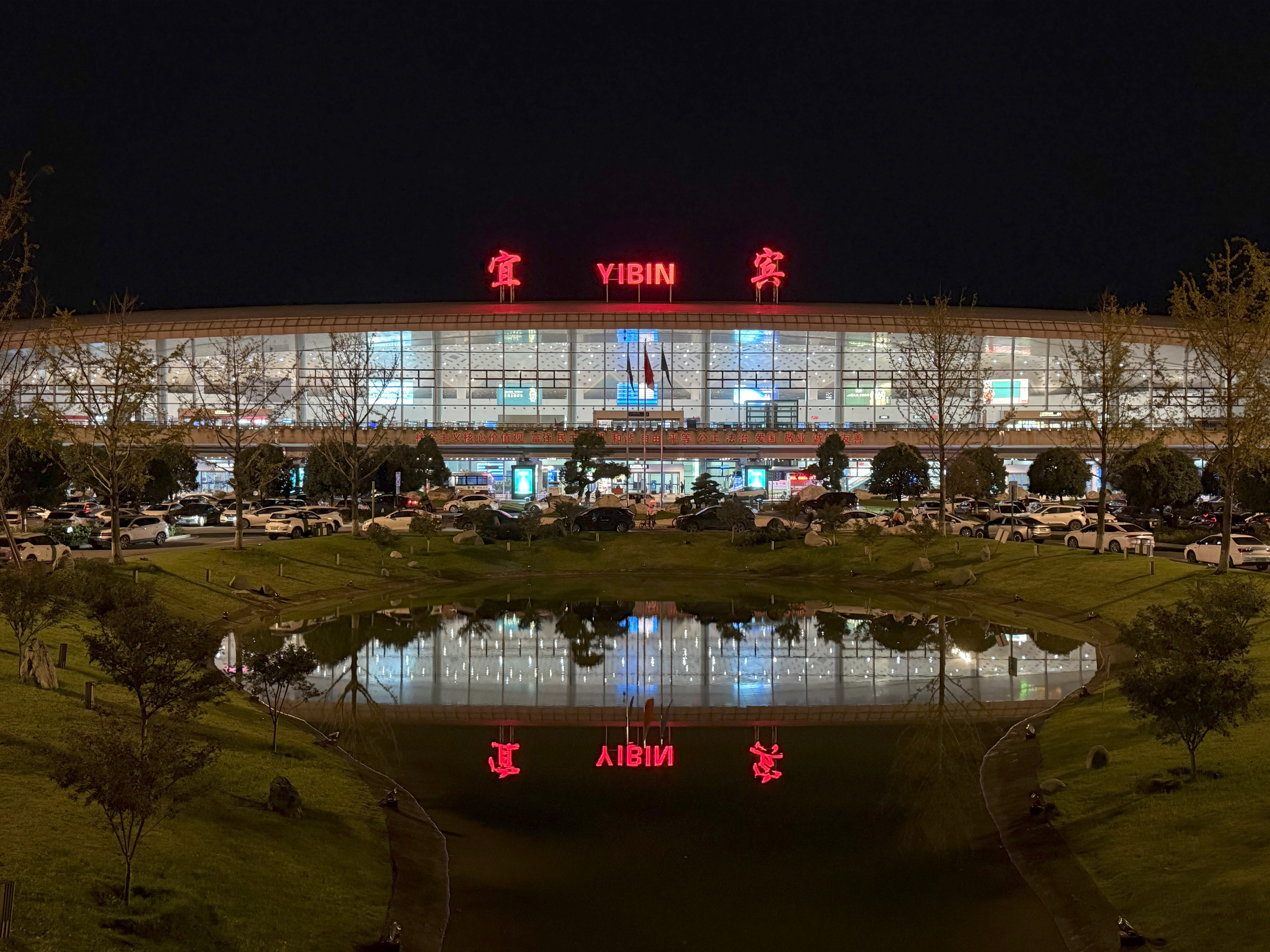
- IATA: YBP; ICAO: ZUYB

Summary
- Airport type: Public / military
- Serves: Yibin
- Location: Zongchang, Cuiping, Yibin, Sichuan, China
- Opened: 5 December 2019; 6 years ago
- Elevation AMSL: 420 m (1,380 ft)
- Coordinates: 28.858°N 104.525°E

Map
- Location of airport in Sichuan

Runways
Direction	Length		Surface
Direction	m	ft	Surface
11/29	2,600	8,530	Concrete

Statistics (2025)
- Passengers: 2,091,670
- Aircraft movements: 18,184
- Cargo (metric tons): 7,611.3

Yibin Wuliangye Airport
- Simplified Chinese: 宜宾五粮液机场
- Traditional Chinese: 宜賓五糧液機場
Transcriptions
Standard Mandarin
- Hanyu Pinyin: Yibīn Wǔliángyè Jīchǎng

Yibin Wuliangye Airport (IATA: YBP, ICAO: ZUYB) is a dual-use public and military airport serving the city of Yibin in southern Sichuan province, China. Opened in December 2019, it replaced the older Yibin Caiba Airport. The airport is named after Wuliangye, a locally made liquor that is one of the most famous baijiu brands in China.

== History ==
The history of Yibin Wuliangye Airport can be traced back to Yibin Airport. Yibin Caiba Airport was a dual‑use military-civil facility that underwent two expansions, in 1991 and 1993. Because its location imposed significant constraints, the airport eventually lost the ability to expand further. In 2011, the airport handled 326,000 passengers—an increase of 12.4% over the previous year—and 2,737.6 tons of cargo, a year‑on‑year rise of 24.2%. With passenger throughput surpassing the 300,000 mark and reaching a new record since the airport opened, relocating the airport became an urgent necessity.

The relocation plan for Yibin Airport officially began preparations in 2008, and the "Pre-feasibility Study Report for the Construction Project of Yibin Wuliangye Airport" passed the review of the national expert group in 2011. The selected site is Zongchang Township, Cuiping District, Yibin City and a project budget of 1.176 billion yuan. According to the initial environmental impact assessment approval, the civil aviation flight area of Yibin Wuliangye Airport will be built according to the 4C standard, with a new 2,600-meter-long and 45-meter-wide runway, two connecting taxiways, and seven Class C apron stands; a new 8,000-square-meter terminal building will be built in the terminal area; the design target year for 2020 is 800,000 passengers per year, 7,375 tons of cargo per year, and 10,063 aircraft takeoffs and landings per year.

On 14 May 2012, the State Council formally approved the Sichuan Provincial Government's request to establish the "Yibin Wuliangye Airport Construction Project." The new facility was officially named "Yibin Wuliangye Airport" and occupies an area of 4,500 mu (300 ha) in Zongchang Town (宗场), Cuiping District, 11 kilometres (6.8 mi) northwest of the city center. Construction began in October 2016 with a total investment of 2.927 billion yuan, and the airport opened on 5 December 2019. It replaced the older Yibin Caiba Airport. The passenger movements of the airport in 2023 were 2,050,861, making it the 73rd busiest airport in China.

After the expansion, the airport remains classified as a 4C flight zone, with a 2,600-meter-long and 45-meter-wide runway. The number of taxiways has increased, now including two perpendicular connecting taxiways, each 351 meters long and 18 meters wide, and one parallel taxiway. The terminal building has an area of 24,000 square meters, with reserved area for international flights. It is equipped with 6 boarding bridges and 13 aircraft stands (4B9C). It is designed to meet the target of 2 million passengers, 11,000 tons of cargo and mail, and 25,157 aircraft take-offs and landings per year by 2025.

In 2023, the airport will handle 2,050,861 passengers, achieving its target two years ahead of schedule.

== Facilities ==
The airport has a runway that is 2,600 metres (8,500 ft) long and 45 metres (148 ft) wide (class 4C), a 24,000-square-metre (260,000 sq ft) terminal building, and 13 aircraft parking aprons. It is projected to handle 2.5 million passengers annually by 2024.

== Airlines and destinations ==
Airlines	Destinations
Air China	Beijing–Capital, Beijing–Daxing
Air Travel	Changsha, Lijiang, Wuxi
China Eastern Airlines	Kunming, Nanjing, Qingdao, Shanghai–Pudong, Wuhan
China Express Airlines	Chongqing, Huizhou, Lanzhou, Xichang
Colorful Guizhou Airlines	Fuzhou, Haikou, Lishui, Ningbo, Taiyuan, Taizhou, Wuhan, Yangzhou, Yiwu, Zhengzhou
Shenzhen Airlines	Hefei, Quanzhou, Shenyang, Shenzhen, Wenzhou
Sichuan Airlines	Beihai, Beijing–Capital, Changsha, Guangzhou, Hangzhou, Sanya, Ürümqi, Xi'an, Xishuangbanna, Yancheng
Xizang Airlines	Changzhou, Dali, Hangzhou, Lhasa, Xuzhou

== Naming ==
The airport is named after Wuliangye, a famous liquor made in Yibin. This choice of name caused controversy in China. The name has been a target of ridicule by the public and is considered illegal by some legal experts. Although Zunyi Maotai Airport, an airport in Guizhou Province, is also named after a famous liquor brand, Maotai, it has not attracted as much criticism as Maotai itself is named after a town. Responding to the controversy, the Wuliangye Company has declared that it has not paid to have the airport named after its brand.

== See also ==
- List of airports in China
- List of the busiest airports in China
- Huawei station, metro station which also attracted attention for being named after a company
