= North Sichuan Medical College =

Medical school in Sichuan, China

Coordinates: 30.7955°N 106.0791°E

- 川北医学院
- Motto: 敬业、博爱、求是、创新 (Devotion, Philanthropism, Seeking Truth, Innovation)
- Type: Public
- Established: 1951
- President: Du Yong
- Students: 10,396
- Undergraduates: 7,852
- Location: Nanchong, Sichuan, China
- Campus: Urban, 203.5 acres
- Website: www.nsmc.edu.cn

North Sichuan Medical College (NSMC; Chinese: 川北医学院; pinyin: Chuānběi Yīxué Yuàn) is a provincial medical school with campuses in the Shunqing and Gaoping districts in Nanchong city, Sichuan, China.

North Sichuan Medical College is a government-run college of medicine in Sichuan Province and is in the second largest higher education center of Sichuan Province — Nanchong, a famous city, the origin of the Three Kingdoms Culture. Its two campuses occupy an area of over 823,693 square meters.

NSMC has its national and international enrollment; its campuses enroll nearly 10,000 students in undergraduate and postgraduate programs.

== History ==
Founded in 1951 as North Sichuan School of Medicine (southwest region of China), the school was renamed North Sichuan Medical College in 1985.

== Academic departments and schools ==
- School of Basic Medicine
- School of Clinical Medicine (the Affiliated Hospital of North Sichuan Medical College)
- School of Pharmacy
- School of Social Science
- School of Nursing
- School of Continuing Education
- School of Foreign Language and Culture
- Faculty of Medical Imaging
- Faculty of Anesthesiology
- Faculty of Stomatology
- Faculty of Forensic Medicine
- Faculty of Combined Chinese and Western Medicine
- Faculty of Optometry and Ophthalmology

== Campus ==
North Sichuan Medical has two campuses. The west campus, also known as the old campus, is in downtown Nanchong City. The east campus, or the new campus, is in Gaoping District of Nanchong City.

== Affiliated hospitals ==
The Affiliated Hospital of North Sichuan Medical College is one of the best hospitals in northeast Sichuan. It is the only hospital under direct jurisdiction of North Sichuan Medical College. It has an affiliated Nursing School, which is a technical secondary school.

Nanchong Central Hospital became the Affiliated Nanchong Central Hospital of North Sichuan Medical College and the Second Clinical College of North Sichuan Medical College in 2005.

Other affiliated hospitals include the following:

- The Affiliated Bazhong Hospital of North Sichuan Medical College
- The Affiliated Suining Hospital of North Sichuan Medical College
- The Affiliated Mianyang 404 Hospital of North Sichuan Medical College
- The Affiliated Guang'an Hospital of North Sichuan Medical College

== Renowned professors ==
- Prof. Lin Baodong (Pharmacology, also the chairman of North Sichuan Medical College)
- Prof. Kang Jian (Human Anatomy, also the President of North Sichuan Medical College)
- Prof. Yan Jiacheng (Biochemistry)
- Prof. Li Jian (Preventive Medicine)
- Prof. Zhou Jingguo (Hematology, also the president of the Affiliated Hospital of North Sichuan Medical College)
- Prof. Yuan Guohua (Rheumatology and Immunology)
- Prof. Du Yong (Medical Imaging)
- Prof. Li Chengjun (Human Anatomy)
- Prof. Huang Anpei (Histology and Embryology)
- Prof. Xie Xianyong (Pathology)
- Prof. Wen Bing (Pathology)
- Prof. Chen Huaxu (Biochemistry)
- Prof. Cheng Zhongda (Urology)<
- Prof. Zhang Xiaoming (Medical Imaging)
- Prof. Chen Kai (General Surgery)
- Prof. Lv Benru (Physiology)
- Prof. Huang Jiulin (Traditional Chinese Medicine)
- Prof. Lan Changjun (Ophthalmology)
- Prof. Long Cunguo (Neurology)
- Prof. Chen Shaoping (Respirology)
- Prof. Feng Zhisong (Gastroenterology)
- Prof. Yan Zongxun (Endocrinology and Metabolism)
- Prof. Pi Guanghuan (Pediatrics)
- Prof. Wei Yushu (Pediatrics)
- Prof. Sui Weichi (Dermatology)
- Prof. Wang Chongshu (General Surgery)
- Prof. Liu Longyue (ENT)
- Prof. Zeng Yue (Loimology)
- Prof. Wei Jin (Hematology)
- Prof. Cao Liting. (Ultrasound Medicine)
- Prof. Xiao Finagling (Library science; also the chief librarian of North Sichuan Medical College)

== Scientific research ==
- Qing Y, Zhou JG, Yuan G (2009). "Systemic lupus erythematosus presenting as hypoglycaemia with insulin receptor antibodies and insulin autoantibodies". Lupus. 18 (5): 457–9. doi:10.1177/0961203308098188. PMID 19318401. S2CID 25205792.
- Zhang XM, Mitchell DG, Byun JH, Verma SK, Bergin D, Witkiewicz A (Jan 17, 2009). "MR imaging for predicting the recurrence of pancreatic carcinoma after surgical resection". Eur. J. Radiol. 73 (3): 572–8. doi:10.1016/j.ejrad.2008.12.007. PMID 19153022.
- Lin L, Ling BD, Li XZ (2009). "Distribution of the multidrug efflux pump genes, adeABC, adeDE and adeIJK, and class 1 integron genes in multiple-antimicrobial-resistant clinical isolates of Acinetobacter baumannii-Acinetobacter calcoaceticus complex". Int. J. Antimicrob. Agents. 33 (1): 27–32. doi:10.1016/j.ijantimicag.2008.06.027. PMID 18790612.
- Zhang XM, Mitchell DG, Witkiewicz A, Verma S, Bergin D (Jul 30, 2008). "Extrapancreatic neural plexus invasion by pancreatic carcinoma: characteristics on magnetic resonance imaging". Abdominal Imaging. 34 (5): 634–41. doi:10.1007/s00261-008-9440-4. PMID 18665418. S2CID 35785331.
- Feng G, Wan Y, Balian G, Laurencin CT, Li X (2008). "Adenovirus-mediated expression of growth and differentiation factor-5 promotes chondrogenesis of adipose stem cells". Growth Factors. 26 (3): 132–42. doi:10.1080/08977190802105917. PMC 3034080. PMID 18569021.
- Peng B, Wang YP, Shang Y, Guo Y, Yang ZW (2008). "Effect of vasectomy via inguinal canal on spermatogenesis in rabbits". Asian J. Androl. 10 (3): 486–93. doi:10.1111/j.1745-7262.2008.00394.x. PMID 18385911.
- He G, Ouyang Q, Chen D, Li F, Zhou J (2007). "The microvascular thrombi of colonic tissue in ulcerative colitis". Dig. Dis. Sci. 52 (9): 2236–40. doi:10.1007/s10620-006-9158-5. PMID 17429731. S2CID 25197016.

== Scholarships ==
- Canadian Fuhui Charity Foundation Scholarship
- Hong Kong Fuhui Charity Foundation Scholarship
- Guangzhou Study Grant
- State Study Grant of China
- Overseas Alumni Study Grant

== Faculty ==
NSMC has over 400 members of the faculty holding Master’s or Doctorate degrees. More than 300 have obtained the academic title of professor and associate professor. In addition, there are over 50 returned scholars and experts. Over 20 of them enjoy special government subsidies or have been given positions of national leadership in their field.

== Facilities ==
There are three national scientific research labs, three provincial key subjects, one key lab, one course, and 13 key courses on the provincial level.

Its library has over 930,000 books and has subscribed to more than 1,567 Chinese, English and foreign periodicals in addition to over 17,000 electronic periodicals both in Chinese and foreign languages.

North Sichuan Medical College is famous for its Faculty of Medical Imaging, which is one of the first five medical imaging faculties in China. In 2005, North Sichuan Medical College began to enroll its first postgraduate students.

== Achievements ==
In recent years, the college has undertaken 8 national research projects, five projects from the Ministry of Education, Ministry of Public Health and State Chinese Medicine Administration, and 238 provincial key and scientific research projects. It has published 3,500 scientific research papers, 65 treatises, among which 54 papers have been embodied by SCI and ET.

The rate of employment among graduates remains above 95%, the highest among colleges in Sichuan Province.

== See also ==
- List of universities and colleges in Sichuan
