= Nanchong White Tower Park =

Park in Nanchong, China

Nanchong White Tower Park is a comprehensive park in Nanchong, Gaoping, and it is the provincial key cultural relic's protection units. The White tower was commonly known as "the white tower" in the song dynasty, formerly known as "the boundless pagoda". It was built in the Northern Song dynasty (AD 960), and has lasted more than one thousand years.

== Location ==
The White Tower Park, located in Nanchong, Gaoping, is connected to the city center on the other side of the river by an impressive large bridge. Jialing River, one of the most important tributaries of the Yangtze River, flows under the bridge – in this location, the river is very wide, very quiet and very deep.

== Decoration ==
The White Tower is 39.56 meters tall, with thirteen layer imitation wood of square tower. It is valued for art and history; since ancient times, many people have visited the White Tower to study the exquisite workmanship and sculptures in the woods. White Tower Park is a brick tower with stone as the stylobate, and the forms of dragons are carved around the patterns. The body of the towers is 13 floors. It can be entered through an arch on the first floor.

== Architect ==
The tower was built by Lu Ban, an inventor in ancient China and regarded as the Father by the civil craftsmen. At that time, he made a bet with his disciple – a white tower and a black tower were built by each one, and the one who completed the tower first would be the winner. The white tower, built by Luban, was the first to be finished, and remains extant.

== Extension ==
In 2009, the White Tower had extended the area to twice in the square, and the road infrastructure construction in the park had been basically completed. These buildings were completed at the end of December and it opened to the public before the Spring Festival. The white tower was finished in 2011 and covered an area of 210 acres of the park. As of 2014, the white tower park has completed the second expansion, which increased the area to 500 acres, making it the biggest leisure park in Nanchong.
