= China West Normal University =

University in Nanchong, China

- 西华师范大学
- Type: Public
- Established: 1946
- President: Zhang Jian
- Faculty: 1,274
- Administrative staff: 1,820
- Students: 30,343
- Location: Nanchong, Sichuan, China
- Campus: Nanchong
- Website: cwnu.edu.cn

China West Normal University (CWNU; Chinese: 西华师范大学; pinyin: Xīhuá Shīfàn Dàxué) is a provincial public normal university featuring teachers education and training located in Nanchong, Sichuan, China.

The university was originally established in 1946. It now has 30,343 students.

== History ==
China West Normal University is the oldest established teacher training university in Sichuan province, which grew out of the Northern Sichuan Agricultural and Industrial College founded in 1946.

In the city of Nanchong, the economic and cultural center of northeastern Sichuan, on the middle reach of Jialing River, known as 'Silk City', CWNU's reputation is influenced by its scenery, teaching resources, academic atmosphere and research facilities.

== Campus ==
The university consists of two campuses (the new campus and the original one) covering a total area of 2,500 mu with constructed area of 903,400 square meters.

CWNU has many kinds of functional classrooms, with an area of 104,000 square meters.

The Experimental building has an area of 110,000 square meters including respective laboratory buildings for Arts and Science colleges, college of Fine Art, college of Music, school-owned museum and a Specimen Building. In addition, two libraries possess a collection of 2,226,000 volumes and 7,740 varieties of magazines and newspapers.

The whole university is fully equipped from the dormitories and five dining halls, to teaching and training facilities for physical education, including track and field stadiums, multifunctional gymnasiums, courts and playing fields.

== Faculty ==
The university is an important research center for education development, a key training base for qualified middle school teachers, and the provincial training center for teachers’ further education.

CWNU has 1,820 staff members, including 1,274 full-time teachers, among whom there are 561 professors and associate professors, and 633 professional teachers have master's degree. There are 167 graduate supervisors, and 17 experts.

The total enrollment in CWNU has reached around 25,000, including undergraduates, graduates, international students plus adult students for continuing education.

== Colleges and departments ==
CWNU has 21 colleges and departments, plus 28 research institutes, offering 121 master's programs, 71 majors for four-year undergraduates, 5 for three-year students. The university has 4 provincial key subjects, 3 provincial key laboratories, 14 provincial key courses, 21 provincial-level Elaborate Courses and 3 famous provincial undergraduate majors. Moreover, CWNU provides 11 provincial training centers for undergraduate talents, and offers a training basis for postgraduates of education as well as postgraduates of agricultural popularization.

All majors and programs are widely open to overseas students, among which subjects like Chinese, History, Education, Fine Arts, Music, Dancing, Wushu, Chinese Calligraphy show the most popularity.

== Exchange ==
In recent years, CWNU has become actively involved in international exchanges and co-operations, especially in cultural and academic fields. It has built partnerships through diverse ways of communication and cooperation with many universities and education organizations in the US, Canada, Australia, Japan, Korea, Germany, Taiwan and Hong Kong. The university has enrolled overseas students since 1997, with the enrollment in the charge of its Foreign Affairs Office. With curricula covering a wide range of subjects, CWNU provides admission to overseas students with programs — long- or short-term Chinese language trainees, potential undergraduates majoring in Chinese language, graduates majoring in Linguistics and Applied Linguistics, and undergraduates or graduates with would-be majors that they've selected. Meanwhile, groups and organizations for Chinese culture research and study, for short-term Chinese language learning, for Mandarin study, are attracted to CWNU.
