= Yibin University =

Provincial public college in Yibin, Sichuan, China

- 宜宾学院
- Type: Public college
- Established: 1978
- President: Du Zhengcong
- Students: 24,000
- Location: Yibin, Sichuan, China; 28.798°N 104.611°E
- Campus: 2,300 acres (930 ha)
- Website: yibinu.edu.cn

Yibin University (Chinese: 宜宾学院; lit. 'Yibin College') is a provincial public college in Yibin, Sichuan, China. It is administered by the Sichuan Provincial People's Government and co-supported by the provincial and Yibin municipal governments.

The university traces its history to Yibin Normal College, established in 1978. It took its current form in 2001 after merging with the Yibin Branch of the Sichuan Institute of Education, becoming the first undergraduate-level institution in Yibin. Since then, it has developed into an institution offering programs in education, engineering, management, arts, and other fields.

== History ==
In 1975, Sichuan Normal College established a pilot class called "Come and go" in Maiba Township, Lizhuang District, which was named as the Yibin Branch of Sichuan Normal University. This was the predecessor of Yibin College. In June 1977, the school was restructured into Yibin Regional Communist Labor University. On December 28, 1978, the State Council of the People's Republic of China approved the establishment of Yibin Normal College on the basis of Yibin Regional Communist Labor University. At that time, the campus was located in Baimiao Village, Maiba Township, Nanxi County (now Li Zhuang Town, Cuiping District, Yibin City), and three majors were approved. In 1985, the school relocated to Jiangbei, Qiaoxi Bay, Yibin City (now Anfu Street, Cuiping District). In 1993, the Ministry of Education of the People's Republic of China approved the renaming of the school to Yibin Normal Higher Vocational College. In May 2001, the Ministry of Education of the People's Republic of China agreed to integrate the educational resources of Yibin Normal Higher Vocational College and the Yibin Branch of Sichuan Education College to establish Yibin College at the undergraduate level.

With the completion and opening of the waterfront campus in the Sanjiang New Area University City, Yibin University has also begun to strive for the granting of master's degree awarding units and discuss upgrading to a university, in order to promote the development of science and technology innovation industries and educational undertakings in Yibin City.

== Campus ==
In 1985, the People's Government of Sichuan Province agreed to relocate Yibin Normal Higher Vocational College to Qiexi Bay on the north bank of the Min River in Yibin City, and the construction of the campus began. In August 1987, Yibin Normal Higher Vocational College relocated from Lizhuang Town to the Jiangbei Campus in Qiexi Bay (now located at No. 8 Jiusheng Road, Anfu Street, Cuiping District), which is divided into A and B areas. The A area also serves as the location of the college headquarters, while the B area is located at its southern end.

In addition to its main campus, Yibin University has also constructed a waterfront campus in the Sanjiang New Area University City. The first phase of construction was completed on December 31, 2019. Departments such as the Tea College, Intelligent Manufacturing College, Big Data and Software College, Quality Inspection College, and Transportation Service Engineering College have been relocated to the waterfront campus. The architectural style of the campus reflects a blend of Eastern and Western cultures. This campus is adjacent to the Yibin Graduate School of Xihua University, Chengdu University of Technology, Chengdu College of Sichuan International Studies University, and Chengdu University of Technology among other higher education institutions in Yibin. It can be accessed via the Yibin Intelligent Rail T1 Line to travel between downtown Yibin and the Chengdu-Guizhou Intercity Bus Line Yibin West Station.

== Academics ==
=== Schools ===
When the school was founded in 1978, Yibin Normal College had only three majors: Chinese, mathematics and physics. In the future, as the enrollment scale expanded and the needs of actual development, the number of subjects continued to increase. As of 2022, Yibin University has 13 departments and 3 secondary colleges, offering a total of 63 undergraduate majors, including 1 national first-class undergraduate major, 9 provincial first-class undergraduate majors, and 6 provincial applied demonstration majors; The disciplines established have certain local characteristics and application.

| Name | Subjects | Website |
|---|---|---|
| School of Economics and Business Administration | Business Administration, Tourism Management, International Economics and Trade, Financial Management, Logistics Management (Undergraduate); Tourism Management (College) | ※ |
| School of Intelligent Manufacturing | Electronic Information Science and Technology, Mechanical and Electronic Engineering, Electronic Information Engineering | ※ |
| School of Law and Public Administration | Law, Intellectual Property, Social Work | ※ |
| School of Science | Physics, mathematics (normal undergraduate), mathematics education (junior college) | ※ |
| School of Materials and Chemical Engineering | Chemistry, Applied Chemistry, Pharmaceutical Engineering, Materials Chemistry | ※ |
| School of Agriculture, Forestry and Food Engineering | Biological science, bioengineering, food science and engineering, agronomy, applied biological science, tea science, animal and plant quarantine, forestry | ※ |
| School of Quality Management and Inspection | Quality management engineering, food quality and safety, safety engineering | ※ |
| School of Marxism | (In charge of ideological and political education for school students) | ※ |
| School of Literature and Musical Arts | Chinese language and literature, radio and television studies, musicology, music performance, dance performance, radio and television directing | ※ |
| School of Education | Preschool education, primary education, applied psychology | ※ |
| School of International Education | English, Japanese, Chinese international education | ※ |
| School of Artificial Intelligence and Big Data | Software engineering, computer science and technology, digital media technology, data science and big data technology, information and computing science | ※ |
| School of Art and Product Design | Environmental design, visual communication design, product design, fine arts (undergraduate); art design (junior college) | ※ |
| School of International Applied Technology | Environmental engineering, automotive service engineering, industrial engineering, engineering management, building electrical and intelligence | ※ |
| School of Physical Education and General Health | Physical education, social sports guidance and management, rehabilitation therapy, nursing | ※ |

=== Academic Resources ===
Yibin University Library was established at the beginning of the school's founding, with a collection of over 11.53 million volumes of various books. In addition, the library subscribes to multiple databases such as CNKI, Wanfang Database, and Superstar Academic Video Database. The library also has a collection of liquor culture and has created a local literature exhibition room. The library has also been open to the public in Yibin City and has hosted special lectures and academic research activities. In 2022, the Sichuan Provincial Local Chronicles Institute established a branch at the university to collect and preserve local documents of Yibin and display local information. The "Journal of Yibin University" is a comprehensive academic journal sponsored by Yibin University. Its predecessor was the "Journal of Yibin Teachers College", which was founded in October 1981. It was temporarily suspended in May 1982 but later resumed. In 2001, it was renamed following the school's upgrade to an undergraduate institution. The journal has columns such as "Research on Sichuan Thinkers" and "Research on Liquor Culture".

=== Scientific research ===
Yibin University also leverages the existing resources in Yibin City and has carried out a series of scientific research projects around the characteristic industries of Yibin, such as Sichuan tea, Sichuan bamboo, camphor, and fermentation food ingredients. The university's Camphor Engineering Technology Research Center has developed practical products utilizing the characteristics of camphor, including antibacterial sprays, air purifiers, cockroach exterminators, mosquito repellents, and hand sanitizers. The Solid-State Fermentation Resource Utilization Key Laboratory of Sichuan Province primarily focuses on developing high-quality liquor, fermented pickles, tofu products, condiments, and other solid-state fermentation foods. The Sichuan Tea College has achieved significant breakthroughs in the fields of Sichuan tea and Tibetan tea industries through research in the "Sichuan Key Laboratory of Refined Sichuan Tea", among others, and as a result, has been selected as one of the first provincial-level "Modern Industry Institutes" in Sichuan Province.

Yibin University also collaborates with the local government of Jiang'an County to improve soybean and rice breeding techniques, develop high-quality oil tea and tung trees, and enhance the processing and preservation capabilities of agricultural products. Through training programs, the university has cultivated talents in fields such as e-commerce, integrated rice-prawn farming, and the bamboo industry, contributing to the local community's development.
