= Shunqing, Nanchong =

Shunqing 顺庆区
- District
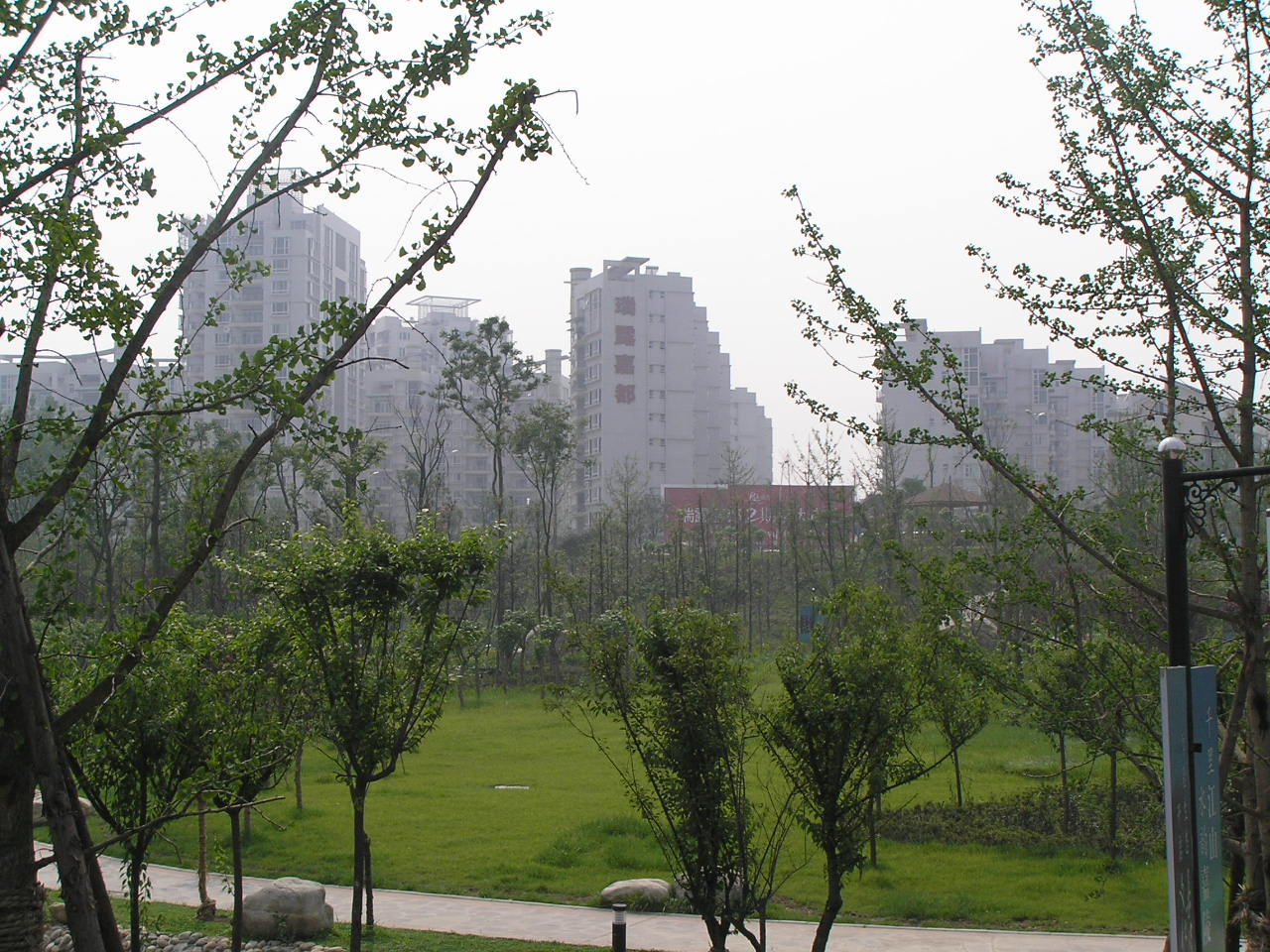

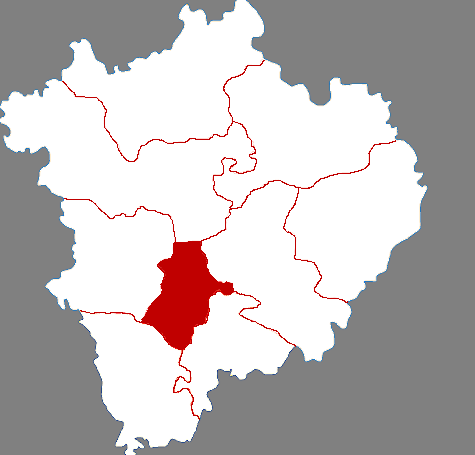

- Location in Sichuan
- Coordinates: 30°47′05″N 106°05′27″E
- Country: China
- Province: Sichuan
- Prefecture-level city: Nanchong
- District seat: Zhongcheng Subdistrict

Area
  - Total: 545 km^{2} (210 sq mi)

Population (2020 census)
  - Total: 834,294
  - Density: 1,530/km^{2} (3,960/sq mi)
- Time zone: UTC+8 (China Standard)
- Website: www.shunqing.gov.cn

Shunqing District (simplified Chinese: 顺庆区; traditional Chinese: 順慶區; pinyin: Shùnqìng Qū) is a district of Nanchong city, Sichuan Province, China.

One campus of North Sichuan Medical University is in the district.

== Administrative divisions ==
Shunqing District administers 12 subdistricts, 6 towns, and 1 township:

- Zhongcheng Subdistrict (中城街道)
- Beicheng Subdistrict (北城街道
- Xicheng Subdistrict (西城街道)
- Dongnan Subdistrict (东南街道)
- Wufeng Subdistrict (舞凤街道)
- Xinjian Subdistrict (新建街道)
- Huafengjie Subdistrict (华凤街道)
- Hepinglu Subdistrict (和平路街道)
- Yingxi Subdistrict (潆溪街道)
- Jingxi Subdistrict (荆溪街道)
- Xishan Subdistrict (西山街道)
- Banzeng Subdistrict (搬罾街道)
- Gongxing Town (共兴镇)
- Jintai Town (金台镇)
- Luxi Town (芦溪镇)
- Lijia Town (李家镇)
- Shuangqiao Town (双桥镇)
- Yuxi Town (渔溪镇)
- Xinfu Township (新复乡)
