= Zerefeh Bashur =

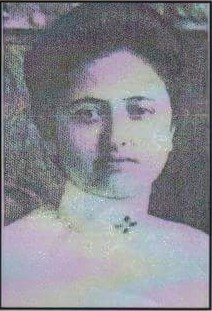

Zerefeh Bashur, MD (Safita, Syria; 1884 – 1968) was the first female licensed physician in the Levant.

== Education and practice ==
Zerefeh Bashur was born in 1884 into an Orthodox Christian family in Safita, Syria, then a part of the Ottoman Empire.

Born into a family of physicians, Zerefeh often accompanied her father and older brothers in their clinics. She noticed that the patients were predominantly men, as many of the women would not expose themselves to physicians, who were exclusively male. This prompted her to decide on a career in medicine for herself – a noteworthy feat, given that males during this time in the Ottoman Empire typically did not study past the 5th grade, and females would end their studies in the 2nd grade.

Zerefeh began her studies in the American Protestant School in Safita, which she continued in Tripoli (in what is now Lebanon) in the Tripoli Girls School.

Following in the footsteps of her brothers, who had received their degrees from the University of Illinois, Zerefeh convinced her father to let her pursue a medical degree in the United States. She left for the US in 1907, enrolling in the University of Illinois College of Medicine that same year, and receiving her medical degree in 1911.

Dr. Bashur returned to the Middle East after completing her training, and practiced in Tripoli and Safita until her death in 1968, bringing modern medicine to women in the Middle East for the first time, and delivering thousands of newborns over the course of a career that spanned over half a century.

Her nephew was Dr. Fouad Bashour.
