= Fouad Bashour =

Cardiologist and academic

Fouad Bashour (1924–2003) was an American cardiologist and Ashbel Smith professor of medicine at the University of Texas Southwestern Medical Center.

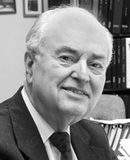
Fouad Bashour

== Education and practice ==
Bashour was born in 1924 into a Syrian Christian family of physicians. His aunt was Zerefeh Bashur, the first female physician in the Levant. He received his MD in 1949 from the American University of Beirut and his PhD in medicine in 1957 from the University of Minnesota.

Following completion of his studies, Bashour moved to Dallas, Texas. He became instructor, and later professor, of internal medicine in 1959 at UT Southwestern, where he practiced until his death in 2003.

The annual Bashour Lectureship and the Bashour Distinguished Chair in Physiology at UT Southwestern are named in his honor.

== John F. Kennedy ==
Bashour was the resident cardiologist at Parkland Memorial Hospital in Dallas, Texas, on November 22, 1963, when President John F. Kennedy was shot and admitted to the hospital. The President was declared dead at around 12:55 pm, according to Bashour’s notes.

Two days later, Lee Harvey Oswald, the man who shot the President, was himself shot while being escorted by police officers. Oswald was subsequently taken to Parkland Memorial Hospital, where the cardiologist treating him would again be Bashour.

== Awards and honors ==
- Knight Order of Holy Cross, Jerusalem
