= Cuiping, Yibin =

Cuiping 翠屏区
- District
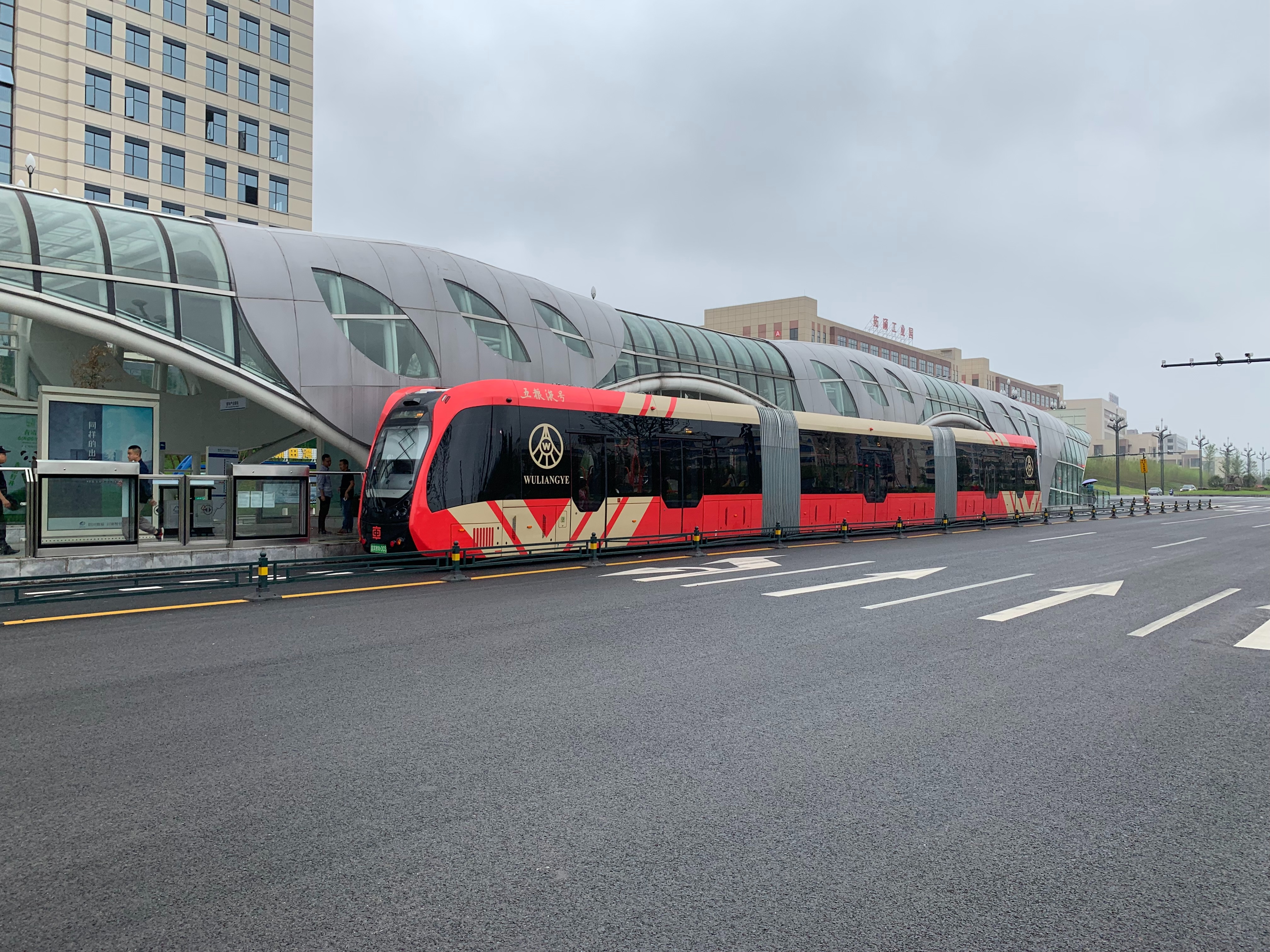
- Transport by ART in Yibin

- Location in Sichuan
- Coordinates: 28°45′58″N 104°37′14″E
- Country: China
- Province: Sichuan
- Prefecture-level city: Yibin
- District seat: Beicheng Subdistrict

Area
  - Total: 1,131.02 km^{2} (436.69 sq mi)
- Elevation: 293 m (961 ft)

Population (2020 census)
  - Total: 887,359
  - Density: 784.565/km^{2} (2,032.01/sq mi)
- Time zone: UTC+8 (China Standard)
- Website: www.cuiping.gov.cn

Cuiping (Chinese: 翠屏; pinyin: Cuìpíng) is the core urban district of the city of Yibin in Sichuan Province, People's Republic of China, located at the confluence of the Jinsha and Min Rivers, which form the Yangtze here. It was formerly the county-level city of Yibin until 1997, when Yibin was upgraded to a prefecture-level city and the original urban core of Yibin was renamed Cuiping District.

== Administrative divisions ==
Cuiping District administers 8 subdistricts and 12 towns:

- Xijiao Subdistrict (西郊街道)
- Anfu Subdistrict (安阜街道)
- Baishawan Subdistrict (白沙湾街道)
- Xiangbi Subdistrict (象鼻街道)
- Shaping Subdistrict (沙坪街道)
- Hejiangmen Subdistrict (合江门街道)
- Daguanlou Subdistrict (大观楼街道)
- Shuangcheng Subdistrict (双城街道)
- Lizhuang Town (李庄镇)
- Caiba Town (菜坝镇)
- Jinping Town (金坪镇)
- Mouping Town (牟坪镇)
- Liduan Town (李端镇)
- Zongchang Town (宗场镇)
- Songjia Town (宋家镇)
- Sipo Town (思坡镇)
- Baihua Town (白花镇)
- Shuangyi Town (双谊镇)
- Yongxing Town (永兴镇)
- Jinqiuhu Town (金秋湖镇)
