= Gaoping, Nanchong =

Gaoping 高坪区
- District
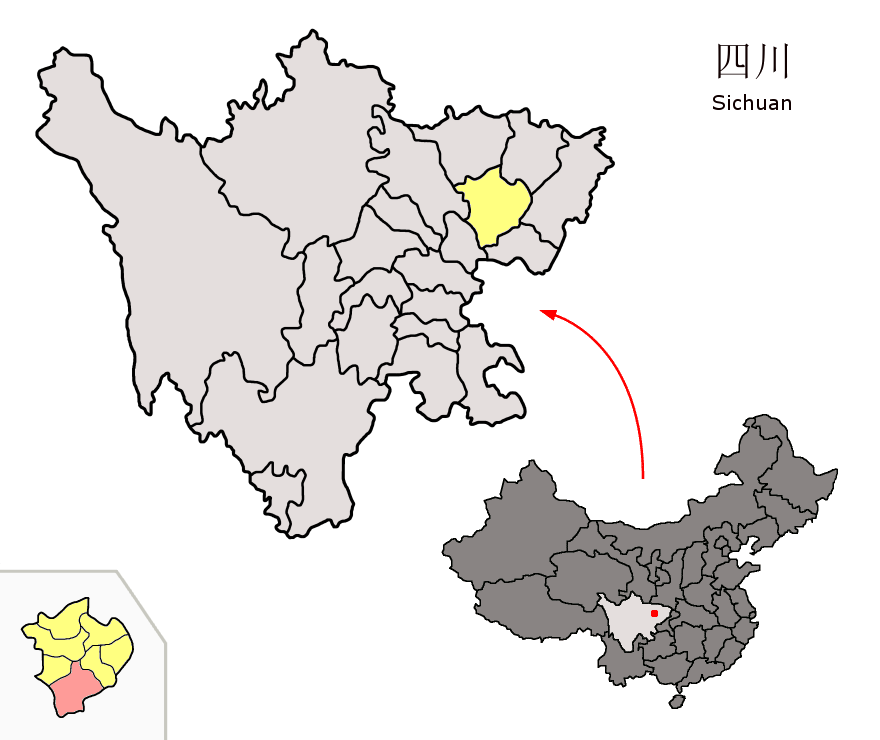
- Location of the district (red) in Nanchong (yellow) and Sichuan province

- Location in Sichuan
- Coordinates: 30.782°N 106.119°E
- Country: China
- Province: Sichuan
- Prefecture-level city: Nanchong

Area
  - Total: 812 km^{2} (314 sq mi)

Population (2020 census)
  - Total: 570,415
  - Density: 702/km^{2} (1,820/sq mi)
- Time zone: UTC+8 (China Standard)
- Postal code: 637100
- Area code: 0817
- Division code: GPQ
- Website: www.gaoping.gov.cn

Gaoping (Chinese: 高坪; pinyin: Gāopíng) is a district of the city of Nanchong, Sichuan province, China.

Gaoping has an area of 812 km^{2} (314 sq mi) and a population of around 600,000.

== Administrative divisions ==
Gaoping District comprises 8 subdistricts, 10 towns and 1 township:

subdistricts

- Baita 白塔街道
- Qingxi 清溪街道
- Xiaolong 小龙街道
- Longmen 龙门街道
- Qinglian 青莲街道
- Dujing 都京街道
- Laojun 老君街道
- Luoxi 螺溪街道

towns

- Jiangling 江陵镇
- Ca'er 擦耳镇
- Dongguan 东观镇
- Changle 长乐镇
- Shengguan 胜观镇
- Quejia 阙家镇
- Shigui 石圭镇
- Qingju 青居镇
- Huilong 会龙镇
- Zouma 走马镇

township

- Fomen 佛门乡

== Education ==
One campus of North Sichuan Medical University is in the district.
