= Yibin =

Yibin 宜宾市
- Prefecture-level city
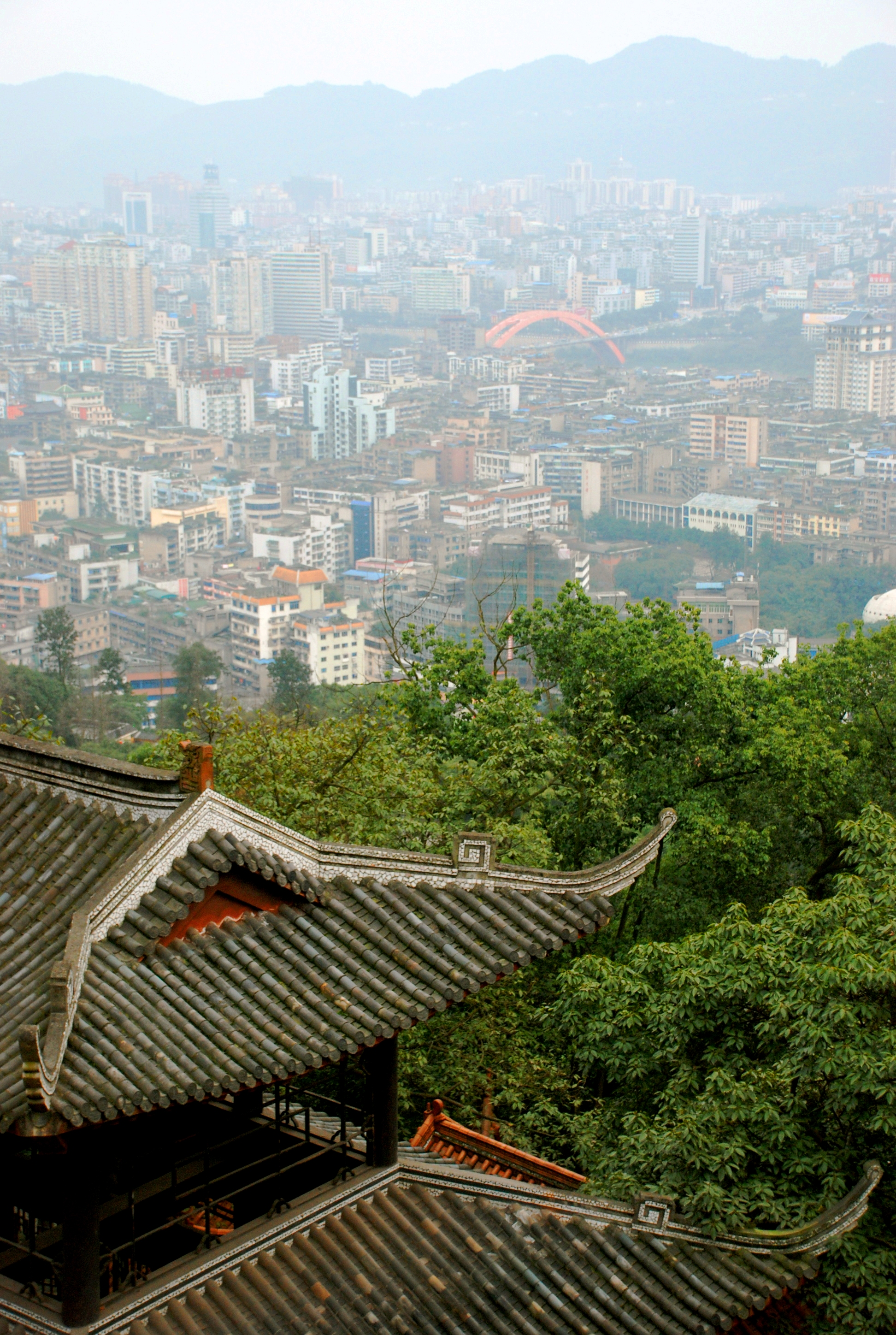
- View of Yibin from Cuiping Mountain

- Location of Yibin City (jurisdiction) in Sichuan

- Location in Southwest China Yibin (China)
- Coordinates (Yibin municipal government): 28°45′07″N 104°38′35″E
- Country: People's Republic of China
- Province: Sichuan
- Municipal seat: Xuzhou District

Area
  - Prefecture-level city: 13,293.89 km^{2} (5,132.80 sq mi)
  - Urban: 80 km^{2} (31 sq mi)
  - Metro: 1,131 km^{2} (437 sq mi)
- Elevation: 321 m (1,053 ft)

Population (2020 census)
  - Prefecture-level city: 4,588,804
  - Density: 345.1814/km^{2} (894.0158/sq mi)
  - Urban: 2,158,312
  - Urban density: 27,000/km^{2} (70,000/sq mi)
  - Metro: 2,158,312
  - Metro density: 1,908/km^{2} (4,943/sq mi)

GDP
  - Prefecture-level city: CN¥ 152.6 billion US$ 24.5 billion
  - Per capita: CN¥ 34,060; US$ 5,469
- Time zone: UTC+8 (China Standard)
- Postal code: 644000
- Area code: 0831
- ISO 3166 code: CN-SC-15
- Licence Plate Prefix: 川Q
- Website: yibin.gov.cn

Yibin (simplified Chinese: 宜宾; traditional Chinese: 宜賓; pinyin: Yíbīn; Wade–Giles: I-pin; Sichuanese Pinyin: ȵi^{2}bin^{1}; Sichuanese pronunciation: [ɲi˨˩pin˥]) is a prefecture-level city in the southeastern part of Sichuan province, China, located at the junction of the Min and Yangtze Rivers. Its population was 4,588,804 inhabitants, according to the 2020 census, of whom 2,158,312 lived in the built-up area comprising three urban districts.

== History ==
Human habitation of Yibin dates back at least 4,000 years. At that time, this place was one of the important birthplaces of ancient Bashu culture. Yibin was established as a county in the Han dynasty (206 BC − AD 220). Under the Ming and Qing, the town and its hinterland was known as Xuzhou Commandery (叙州府; 敘州府; Xùzhōufǔ), which was variously romanized as Suifu, Suifoo, Xufu, and Suchow. In 1907, its population was estimated to be 50,000.

== Geography and climate ==
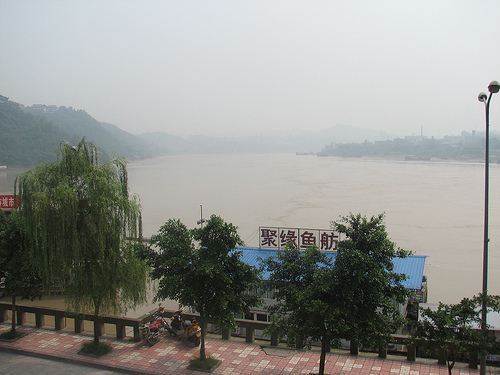
The Yangtze at the confluence of the Min and Jinsha Rivers. Below Yibin, the Yangtze is known in Chinese as Chang Jiang or the "Long River". Above Yibin, the Yangtze is known as the Jinsha or Gold Sands River.

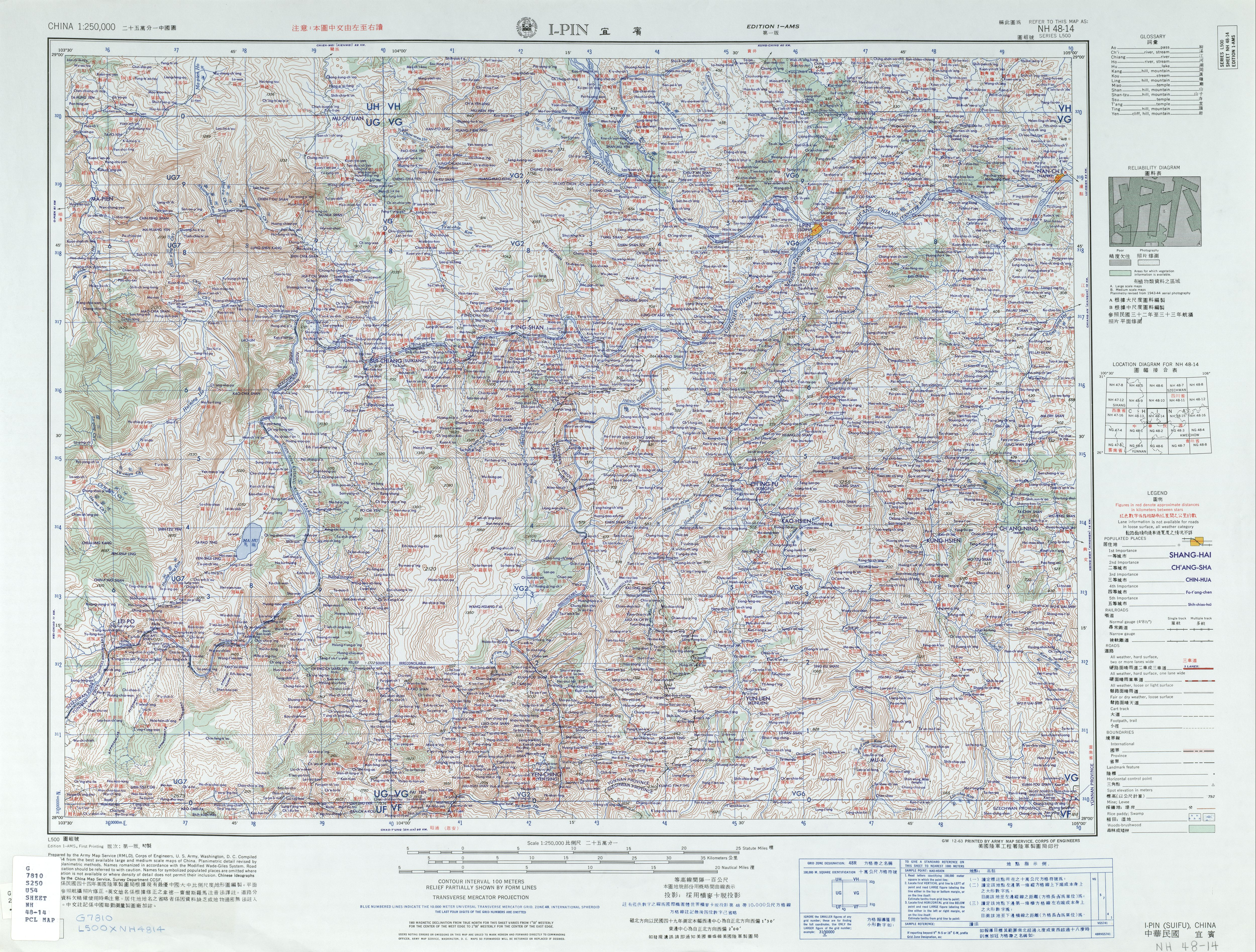
Map including Yibin (labeled as I-PIN (SUIFU) 宜賓(敘州)) (AMS, 1954)

Yibin is located in the southeast portion of Sichuan at the southern end of the Sichuan Basin, bordering Zhaotong (Yunnan) to the south, Luzhou to the east, Liangshan Yi Autonomous Prefecture and Leshan to the west, and Zigong to the north, and has a total area is 13,283 square kilometres (5,129 sq mi). The city ranges in latitude from 27° 50'−29° 16' N, and in longitude from 103° 36'−105° 20' E, stretching 153 km (95 mi) east-west and 150 km (93 mi) north-south.

The city is located at the confluence of the Min and Yangtze Rivers. Above Yibin, the Yangtze is also known as the Jinsha River. Below Yibin, the Yangtze is known in Chinese as the Chang Jiang or "Long River."

As with the rest of the Sichuan Basin, Yibin has a monsoon-influenced humid subtropical climate (Köppen Cwa) with high humidity year-round; winters are short and mild while summers are long, hot, and humid. The monthly 24-hour average temperature ranges from 7.9 °C (46.2 °F) in January to 26.9 °C (80.4 °F) in July and August; the annual mean is 18.03 °C (64.5 °F). Despite its location in the Yangtze River valley, it is still 1.5 to 2.0 °C (2.7 to 3.6 °F) cooler than Chongqing, located further downstream, in its warmest months. Frost is uncommon and the frost-free period lasts 347 days. Rainfall is common year-round but is the greatest in July and August, with very little of it in the cooler months. With monthly percent possible sunshine ranging from 10% in December and January to 42% in August, the city receives only 1,018 hours of bright sunshine annually; Yibin has one of the lowest annual sunshine totals nationally, lower than even nearby Chengdu and Chongqing. Spring (March–April) tends to be sunnier and warmer in the day than autumn (October–November). Extremes in Yibin since 1951 have ranged from −3.0 °C (26.6 °F) on January 3, 1962 to 42.2 °C (108.0 °F) on August 25, 2022.

Climate data for Yibin, elevation 341 m (1,119 ft), (1991–2020 normals, extremes 1951–present)
Month	Jan	Feb	Mar	Apr	May	Jun	Jul	Aug	Sep	Oct	Nov	Dec	Year
Record high °C (°F)	20.2 (68.4)	26.2 (79.2)	33.2 (91.8)	35.2 (95.4)	37.4 (99.3)	37.8 (100.0)	40.1 (104.2)	42.2 (108.0)	38.6 (101.5)	32.9 (91.2)	26.8 (80.2)	21.6 (70.9)	42.2 (108.0)
Mean daily maximum °C (°F)	10.5 (50.9)	13.7 (56.7)	18.5 (65.3)	24.2 (75.6)	27.6 (81.7)	29.3 (84.7)	32.1 (89.8)	31.8 (89.2)	27.3 (81.1)	21.9 (71.4)	17.6 (63.7)	12.0 (53.6)	22.2 (72.0)
Daily mean °C (°F)	7.8 (46.0)	10.4 (50.7)	14.3 (57.7)	19.4 (66.9)	22.9 (73.2)	24.9 (76.8)	27.4 (81.3)	27.0 (80.6)	23.4 (74.1)	18.7 (65.7)	14.5 (58.1)	9.4 (48.9)	18.3 (65.0)
Mean daily minimum °C (°F)	6.0 (42.8)	8.1 (46.6)	11.5 (52.7)	16.0 (60.8)	19.4 (66.9)	21.9 (71.4)	24.1 (75.4)	23.7 (74.7)	20.8 (69.4)	16.7 (62.1)	12.5 (54.5)	7.7 (45.9)	15.7 (60.3)
Record low °C (°F)	−3.0 (26.6)	−0.2 (31.6)	1.1 (34.0)	2.2 (36.0)	10.3 (50.5)	14.7 (58.5)	18.0 (64.4)	16.6 (61.9)	12.1 (53.8)	5.9 (42.6)	3.4 (38.1)	−1.4 (29.5)	−3.0 (26.6)
Average precipitation mm (inches)	18.8 (0.74)	21.5 (0.85)	35.1 (1.38)	63.3 (2.49)	85.9 (3.38)	154.8 (6.09)	185.3 (7.30)	184.2 (7.25)	116.1 (4.57)	64.1 (2.52)	28.7 (1.13)	18.4 (0.72)	976.2 (38.42)
Average precipitation days (≥ 0.1 mm)	11.6	10.1	12.5	13.7	14.0	16.5	13.1	13.4	14.8	17.0	11.2	10.8	158.7
Average snowy days	0.4	0.1	0	0	0	0	0	0	0	0	0	0.1	0.6
Average relative humidity (%)	83	79	75	73	72	78	78	78	81	83	82	83	79
Mean monthly sunshine hours	26.9	38.2	73.3	106.6	112.5	92.0	133.5	139.8	77.5	44.1	38.2	28.0	910.6
Percentage possible sunshine	8	12	20	27	27	22	32	35	21	13	12	9	20
Source 1: China Meteorological Administration all-time extreme temperature NOAA all-time January highall-time July high
Source 2: Weather China

== Administrative divisions ==
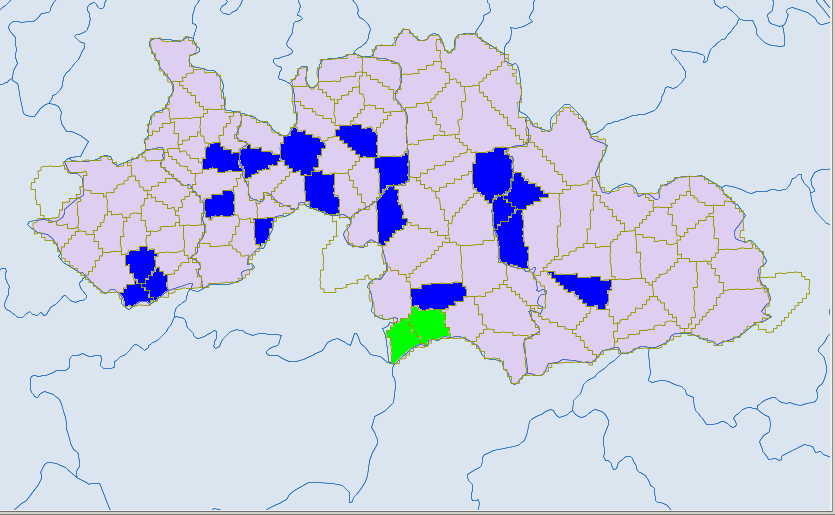
Ethnic townships in South Sichuan: Yibin and Luzhou. Light green = Yi; Blue = Miao.

Map
Name	Hanzi	Hanyu Pinyin	Population (2010)	Area (km^{2})	Density (/km^{2})
Cuiping District	翠屏区	Cuìpíng Qū	836,383	1,123	745
Nanxi District	南溪区	Nánxī Qū	335,805	704	477
Xuzhou District	叙州区	Xùzhōu Qū	813,057	3,034	268
Jiang'an County	江安县	Jiāng'ān Xiàn	399,829	910	439
Changning County	长宁县	Chángníng Xiàn	340,016	975	349
Gao County	高县	Gāo Xiàn	411,118	1,323	310
Junlian County	筠连县	Jūnlián Xiàn	329,056	1,254	262
Gong County	珙县	Gǒng Xiàn	379,798	1,150	330
Xingwen County	兴文县	Xīngwén Xiàn	377,162	1,373	275
Pingshan County	屏山县	Píngshān Xiàn	249,777	1,437	174

== Economy ==
The city's industry focuses on electronics, food products, and power generation. It also produces paper, silk, and leather products. The surrounding region is rich in agricultural resources, growing rice, barley, oil seeds, sesame, and tea.

The largest employer in Yibin is Wuliangye Yibin, a company best known for Wuliangye, a brand of sorghum-based distilled spirits known as baijiu. The Wuliangye Group grew from a small company employing just 300 people in 1977 into a large company employing over 20,000 on a seven-square-kilometer plant. According to an August 2005 article in a securities weekly, the Wuliangye Group is 72% state-owned and provides 70% of the revenues of Yibin City, a major regional center at the head of the Yangtze in southeastern Sichuan. In 2004 6,225 retired military worked for the company, out of a total work force of over 20,000. A third of top management positions are held by retired members of the military. Unsuccessful efforts to diversify its business, poor transparency and a murky ownership pictures are among the company's problems today.

== Education ==
There are several notable education institutes, including Yibin University, also known as Yiyuan, which offers a range of academic programs in a picturesque setting in Cuiping, Yibin. The university is known for providing a secure academic environment. Yibin Vocational and Technical College, held by the Yibin Municipal People's Government, is another prominent institute offering vocational and technical programs to equip students with practical skills.

Yibin has also built a university town

1. Sichuan University of Science and Engineering, Yibin Campus

2. Xihua University, Yibin Campus

3. Chengdu University of Technology, Yibin Campus

4. Sichuan University, Yibin Campus

== Transportation ==
The region's natural waterways provide transportation links with the surrounding area, and Yibin is also connected to Chongqing and Chengdu by rail and express highway. Yibin's proximity to the Yunnan and Guizhou borders also means that transportation to the provinces is available by rail and by bus.

Yibin has three bridges over the Chang Jiang section of the Yangtze and ten bridges over the Jinsha.

Yibin Wuliangye Airport offers flights to Beijing, Guangzhou, Guiyang, Hangzhou, Kunming, Lhasa, Sanya, Shanghai, Shenzhen, Xi'an, and Yichang.

Yibin opened the world's second Autonomous Rapid Transit system in December 2019.

Line	System	Locale	Length	Stations	Opened
Line T1	Yibin ART	Yibin	17.7 km (11.0 mi)	17	2019-12-05

== Tourism ==
There are several hot springs near Yibin, plus many other tourist attractions. Such attractions include the Bamboo Sea in Changning County and the Xingwen Stone Forest. Yibin is also the confluence of the Min and Jinsha Rivers, which together form the Chang Jiang as the Yangtze River is known in Chinese, from Yibin to Shanghai. Cuiping Mountain Park (翠屏山公园; Cuìpíng Shān Gōngyuán), located west of the confluence of those two rivers, provides views of downtown Yibin.Yibin Junlian also has a new attraction located in Xunsi Town, Junlian County, called the Southern Silk Road Never Sleeps City.（南丝绸之路不夜城）

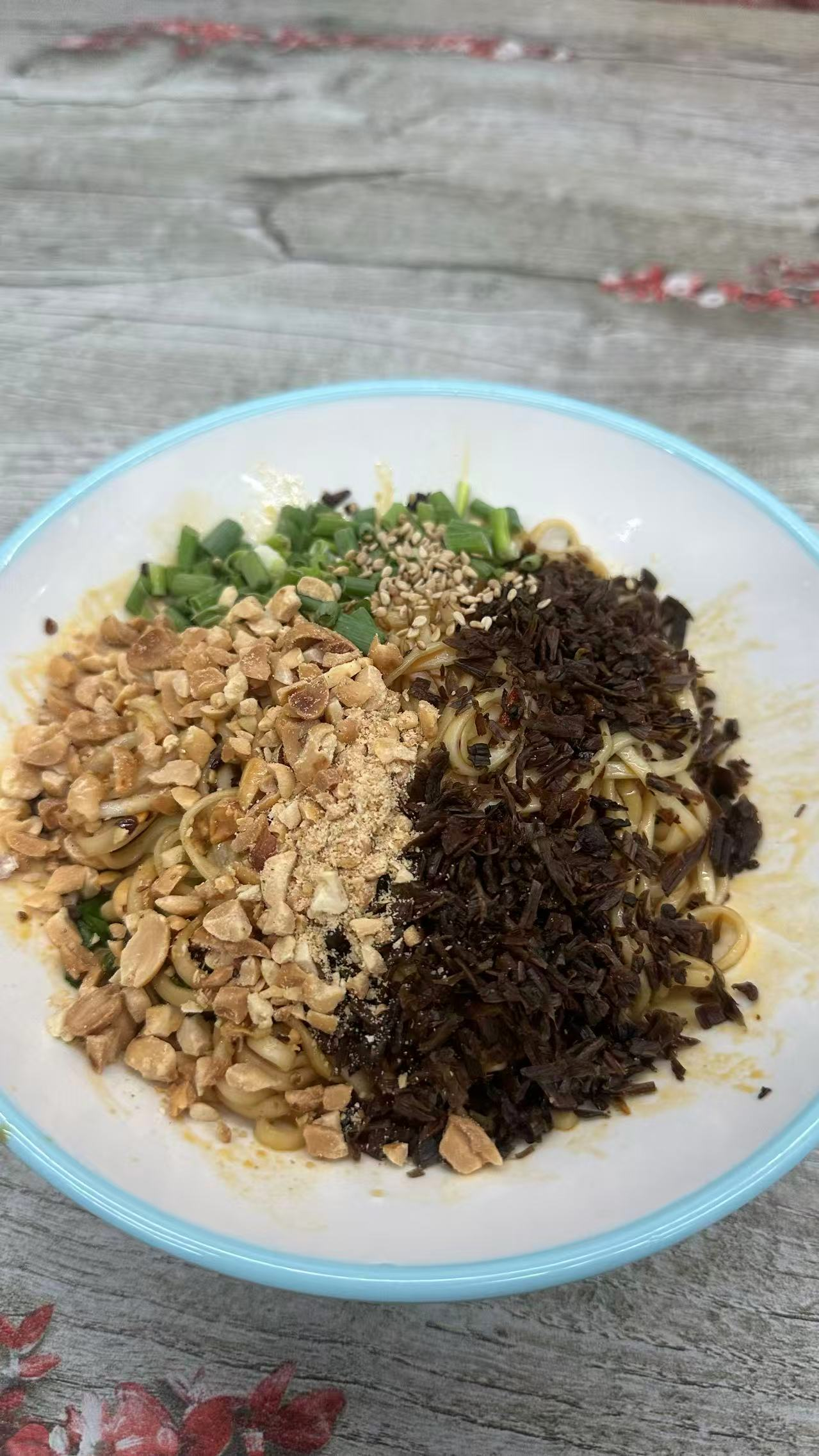
Yibin Burning Noodles（宜宾燃面）

== Gourmet food ==
Yibin Burning Noodles (宜宾燃面) Lizhuang White Meat (李庄白肉) Junlian Peppercorn Chicken (筠连椒麻鸡)

Grape Well Cold Cake (葡萄井凉糕) Gaoxian Hotpot (高县土火锅) Nanxi Dried Tofu (南溪豆腐干) Hongqiao Pig Cake (红桥猪儿粑)

== Notable people from Yibin ==
- Zhao Yiman (赵一曼) During the Anti-Japanese War, Zhao Yiman was an anti-Japanese hero

== Yibin in literature ==
- Dragonfly Eyes by Cao Wenxuan
