= Nanchong =

Nanchong 南充市 Nanchung
- Prefecture-level city
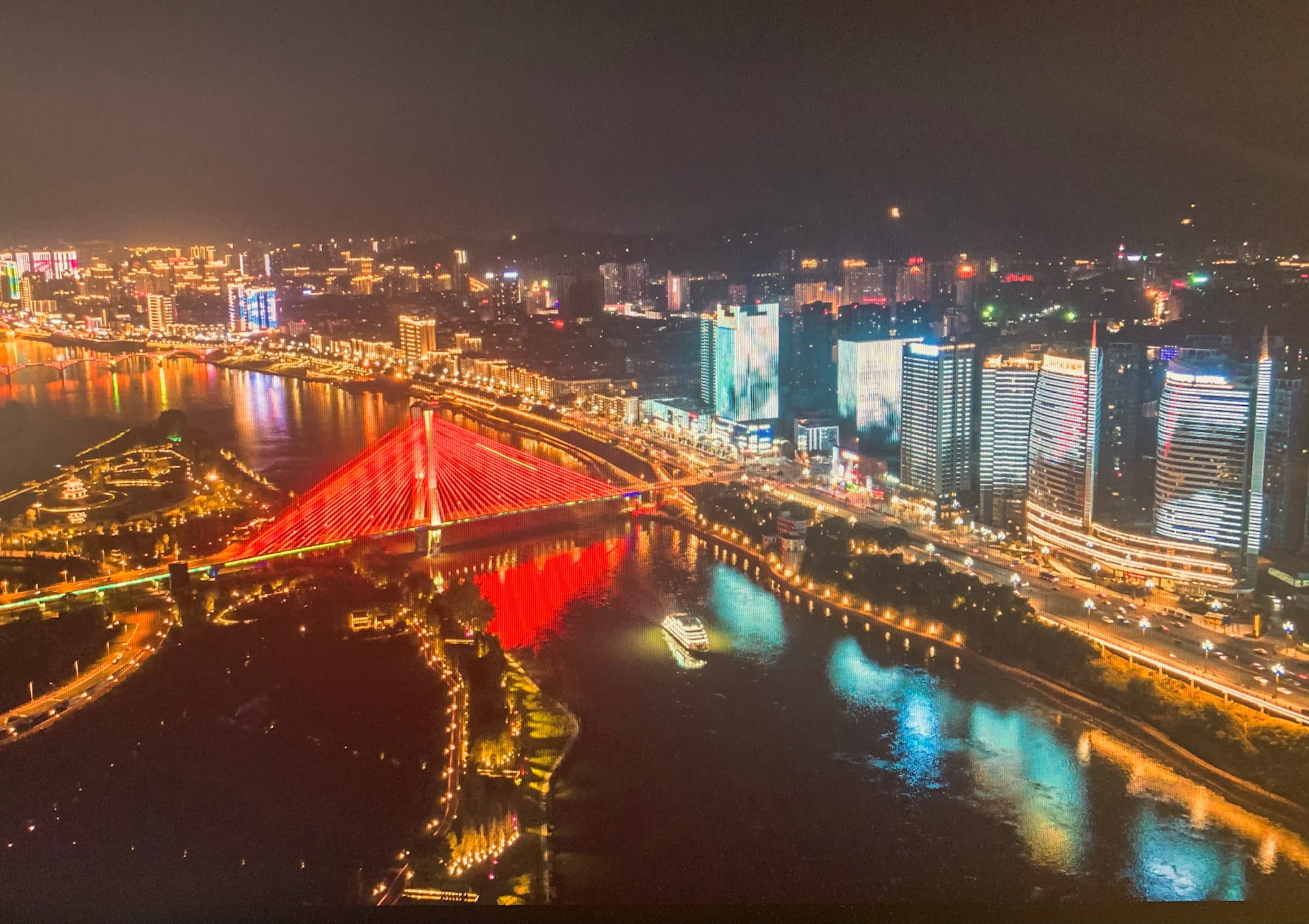
- Nickname: The fruit City
- Location of Nanchong City jurisdiction in Sichuan
- Coordinates (Nanchong Bureau of Civil Affairs (南充市民政局)): 30°46′46″N 106°05′17″E
- Country: People's Republic of China
- Province: Sichuan
- Officiated: 1993
- Municipal seat: Shunqing District

Government
  - Party Secretary: Liu Hongjian

Area
  - Prefecture-level city: 12,479.96 km^{2} (4,818.54 sq mi)
  - Urban: 2,527.8 km^{2} (976.0 sq mi)
  - Metro: 2,527.8 km^{2} (976.0 sq mi)
- Elevation: 340 m (1,120 ft)

Population (2020 census)
  - Prefecture-level city: 5,607,565
  - Density: 449.3256/km^{2} (1,163.748/sq mi)
  - Urban: 1,936,534
  - Urban density: 766.09/km^{2} (1,984.2/sq mi)
  - Metro: 1,936,534
  - Metro density: 766.09/km^{2} (1,984.2/sq mi)

GDP
  - Prefecture-level city: CN¥ 151.6 billion US$ 24.3 billion
  - Per capita: CN¥ 23,881; US$ 3,834
- Time zone: UTC+8 (China Standard)
- Postal code: 637000
- Area code: 0817
- ISO 3166 code: CN-SC-13
- Licence plate prefixes: 川R
- Website: nanchong.gov.cn

Nanchong (Chinese: 南充; pinyin: Nánchōng; Wade–Giles: Nan-ch'ung; Sichuanese: lan^{2}cong^{1}) is a prefecture-level city in the northeast of Sichuan province, China, with an area of 12,479.96 km^{2} (4,818.54 sq mi). At the 2020 census it was home to 5,607,565 people, of whom 1,936,534 lived in the built-up (or 'metro') area made of three urban districts. It is the second most populated city of Sichuan Province, after Chengdu. The administrative center is Shunqing District. At the end of 2024, the resident population of the city was 5.489 million, a decrease of 22,000 from the previous year. The resident population of urban areas is 2.949 million, and the resident population of rural areas is 2.54 million. The urbanization rate of the resident population is 53.73%, an increase of 0.9 percentage points over the previous year. At the end of the year, the registered population of the city was 6.977 million, a decrease of 55,000 compared with the end of the previous year.

== History ==
Nanchong was in the territory of the state of Ba before it was conquered by the Qin in 314 BC. The Qin set up an administrative center at modern Langzhong County-level City. Anhan City was established in Shunqinq district at the beginning of the Han dynasty.

In 202 BC, Emperor Gaozu of Han instituted the Anhan (simplified Chinese: 安汉; traditional Chinese: 安漢) County in this place. Anhan literally means "to establish or stabilize Han". In 8 AD, the name was changed to Anxin (安新) when Wang Mang seized the throne of the Western Han dynasty, but it reverted to Anhan in 25 AD. It was again changed to Guozhou (果州; 'fruit state') in 621 AD (Tang dynasty), and then to Nanchong in 742 AD. The nickname of Nanchong is Guocheng (果城), derived from Guozhou.

== Geography ==
Nanchong is in the northeast of Sichuan Province. To the east of Nanchong is Dazhou, to the west are Mianyang and Suining, to the north are Bazhong and Guangyuan, and to the south is Guang'an.

The vast majority of this area is hilly. The woodland coverage is 25%.

The Jialing River, a tributary of the Yangtze River, crosses the prefecture from north to south. There are another 30 rivers in the prefecture with a drainage basin of more than 30 km^{2} (12 mi^{2}).

=== Climate ===
As with the rest of the Sichuan Basin, Nanchong has a monsoon-influenced humid subtropical climate (Köppen Cwa) with high humidity year-round; winters are short and mild while summers long, hot, and humid. The monthly 24-hour average temperature ranges from 6.5 °C (43.7 °F) in January to 27.3 °C (81.1 °F) in July; the annual mean is 17.38 °C (63.3 °F). Frost is uncommon, and the frost-free period lasts 290−320 days.

Over 70% of the 1,003 mm (39.5 in) of annual precipitation occurs from May to September. With monthly percent possible sunshine ranging from around 9% in December to 47% in August, the city receives only 1,135 hours of bright sunshine annually. Spring (March–April) tends to be sunnier and warmer in the day than autumn (October–November).

Climate data for Nanchong (Gaoping District), elevation 347 m (1,138 ft), (1991–2020 normals, extremes 1951–present)
Month	Jan	Feb	Mar	Apr	May	Jun	Jul	Aug	Sep	Oct	Nov	Dec	Year
Record high °C (°F)	19.4 (66.9)	24.3 (75.7)	31.6 (88.9)	35.2 (95.4)	37.9 (100.2)	38.9 (102.0)	41.3 (106.3)	42.8 (109.0)	41.9 (107.4)	34.5 (94.1)	27.6 (81.7)	21.4 (70.5)	42.8 (109.0)
Mean daily maximum °C (°F)	9.4 (48.9)	12.6 (54.7)	17.6 (63.7)	23.4 (74.1)	26.9 (80.4)	29.2 (84.6)	32.3 (90.1)	32.7 (90.9)	27.2 (81.0)	21.3 (70.3)	16.3 (61.3)	10.5 (50.9)	21.6 (70.9)
Daily mean °C (°F)	6.6 (43.9)	9.1 (48.4)	13.3 (55.9)	18.5 (65.3)	22.1 (71.8)	24.9 (76.8)	27.8 (82.0)	27.6 (81.7)	23.1 (73.6)	17.9 (64.2)	13.1 (55.6)	8.0 (46.4)	17.7 (63.8)
Mean daily minimum °C (°F)	4.4 (39.9)	6.6 (43.9)	10.2 (50.4)	14.8 (58.6)	18.4 (65.1)	21.6 (70.9)	24.3 (75.7)	24.0 (75.2)	20.3 (68.5)	15.7 (60.3)	10.9 (51.6)	6.1 (43.0)	14.8 (58.6)
Record low °C (°F)	−2.9 (26.8)	−0.9 (30.4)	1.2 (34.2)	1.5 (34.7)	9.5 (49.1)	14.3 (57.7)	18.0 (64.4)	16.9 (62.4)	12.7 (54.9)	3.5 (38.3)	−0.4 (31.3)	−3.4 (25.9)	−3.4 (25.9)
Average precipitation mm (inches)	15.5 (0.61)	17.5 (0.69)	38.3 (1.51)	75.9 (2.99)	119.4 (4.70)	162.4 (6.39)	175.1 (6.89)	147.0 (5.79)	121.3 (4.78)	85.6 (3.37)	36.6 (1.44)	16.0 (0.63)	1,010.6 (39.79)
Average precipitation days (≥ 0.1 mm)	9.0	8.3	9.9	11.4	13.7	13.9	12.3	10.0	13.5	15.2	10.2	8.4	135.8
Average snowy days	0.9	0.4	0	0	0	0	0	0	0	0	0	0.4	1.7
Average relative humidity (%)	83	79	74	73	73	79	77	74	81	85	84	85	79
Mean monthly sunshine hours	34.6	47.4	87.8	126.7	129.4	116.6	165.6	180.8	100.5	63.2	51.5	29.3	1,133.4
Percentage possible sunshine	11	15	23	33	30	28	39	44	27	18	16	9	24
Source 1: China Meteorological Administration all-time extreme temperature
Source 2: Weather China

== Subdivisions ==
Map
Name	Hanzi	Hanyu Pinyin	Population (2010)	Area (km^{2})	Density (/km^{2})
Shunqing District	顺庆区	Shùnqìng Qū	635,999	545	1,167
Gaoping District	高坪区	Gāopíng Qū	585,769	812	721
Jialing District	嘉陵区	Jiālíng Qū	691,489	1,170	591
Langzhong City	阆中市	Lángzhōng Shì	870,708	1,877	464
Nanbu County	南部县	Nánbù Xiàn	1,275,748	2,305	553
Yingshan County	营山县	Yíngshān Xiàn	926,940	1,633	568
Peng'an County	蓬安县	Péng'ān Xiàn	702,336	1,334	526
Yilong County	仪陇县	Yílǒng Xiàn	1,088,266	1,695	642
Xichong County	西充县	Xīchōng Xiàn	643,818	1,108	581

== Demographics ==
The Han people are the largest ethnic group in this area, contributing to 99.88% of its population; another 48 ethnic groups can be found in the city. Langzhong has a large Hui Muslim community.

As in other cities of China, the population of Nanchong can be divided into two parts: upper urban population and lower rural population. The registered urban population is about 1.2 million.

Shunqing District, downtown, is the densest area in Nanchong. At the center of Shunqing District, and the proverbial heart of the city, is Five Star Garden (五星花园); a large roundabout with five exits leading to other sections of the city.

== Culture ==
Nanchong City has a long history and culture and is one of the important cultural centers in northeastern Sichuan.

=== Food culture ===
Guokui stuffed with jelly（锅盔灌凉粉）: the outer skin is crispy, and the inner filling is spicy Sichuan jelly.

Nanchong rice noodles（南充米粉）: a rich variety of seasoned rice noodles

Shunqing Mutton Rice Noodles（顺庆羊肉粉）: The rice noodles are fine and smooth in texture.

Steamed buns with white sugar（白糖蒸馍）: naturally fermented, they only have the aroma of wheat and do not have the alkaline taste of steamed buns.

Yingshan Cold Noodles(营山凉面): The cold noodles are golden in color.

== Economy ==
=== Agriculture ===
Agriculture is the pillar of Nanchong's economy, with 80% of Nanchong's population in rural areas and committed to traditional agricultural activities. Nanchong's manufacturing industry also relies on raw materials, which are provided by agriculture.

Nanchong's main agricultural product is food. A large quantity of rice, orange, silk worms, and pork are produced to support related manufacturers.

=== Manufacturing ===
Nanchong's main manufacturing outputs are petroleum products, automobiles and parts, mechanical equipment, textiles, and building materials.

=== Natural resources ===
There is a large quantity of rock oil and natural gas found in Nanchong, and it has the largest slate mine in the west of China. The dams on Jialing River and its branches have a large potential to increase electric power generation. But the largest resource of Nanchong is human: Nanchong is one of the main providers of Chinese cheap migrant workers.

== Transport ==
Transportation in Nanchong is quite convenient compared with other cities in Sichuan province because of its extensive express railway network, shipping, and air service.

Nanchong is a transport hub of the northeast Sichuan Province. It is crossed by the strategic China National Highway 318, built by the Chinese government in the 1930s, and China National Highway 212 and newly built expressways — Cheng-Nan and Nan-Guang expressway — which link the city to Chengdu and another prefecture-level city: Guang'an. The expressway to Chongqing is under construction.

The Dazhou–Chengdu Railway through Nanchong links Chengdu and Dazhou. The Chongqing–Lanzhou Railway, in 2015, will link Lanzhou (Gansu) and Chongqing, and turn Nanchong into a railway hub in northeast Sichuan province. The Nanchong railway station provides passenger and cargo services to regional and national economic centres such as Shanghai, Beijing, Chongqing, Wuhan, Chengdu and Shenzhen.

The old Nanchong airport was built in the 1950s and closed in 2003. The new Nanchong Gaoping Airport which has capacity to land bigger planes, provides regular air services to Beijing, Shanghai, Guangzhou, Shenzhen, Kunming, Xi'an and Sanya.

Nanchong is suggested as a tradition shipping hub in ancient times. Ships from Gansu could reach Chongqing along the Jialing river, but the river is not suitable for modern shipping.

== Education ==
=== Higher education ===
There are five academic institutions in Nanchong that provide higher education.

- Southwest Petroleum University (www.swpu.edu.cn)
- China West Normal University (http://www.cwnu.edu.cn)
- North Sichuan Medical College (www.nsmc.edu.cn)
- Nanchong Professional Technic College (www.nczy.com)
- Hope College of Southwest Jiaotong University (www.swjtuhc.cn)
- Nanchong Vocational College of Culture and Tourism (https://www.ncvcct.com/)
- Nanchong Film Industry Vocational Academy (https://ncdyxy.com/)
- Nanchong Vocational College of Science and Technol (https://www.nstc.edu.cn/)
- Nanchong Technician College (http://www.ncjsxy.net/)

=== Secondary Education ===
Nanchong City has relatively complete secondary education, which ranks among the best in Sichuan Province. Among them, the well-known high schools include:

Nanchong Senior High School (https://www.scncgz.net/)

Nanchong No. 1 Middle School (http://www.ncyzedu.cn/)

Nanchong No. 10 Middle School (http://www.ncsz.net/)

Nanchong Baita High School (https://www.ncbtzx.net/)

Langzhong High School

Nanbu High School

Yilong High School

There are also some schools that are relatively well known in the junior high school stage, such as

Nanchong No. 5 Middle School (https://www.ncswz.com/)

Nanchong No. 7 Middle School

Nanchong No. 9 Middle School

Nanchong Shiyan Middle School (https://www.ncssyzx.net/dist/)

Nanchong Gaoping Middle School (https://www.ncgpzx.cn/)

== Parks ==
- Nanchong White Tower Park

== Notable persons ==
- Chen Shou, historian in the Western Jin dynasty, the author of San guo zhi (the record of Three Kingdoms)
- Luo Ruiqing, general of the Chinese Army, former minister of Public Security of People's Republic of China
- Zhang Lan, former vice-president of People's Republic of China
- Zhang Side, a soldier of the People's Liberation Army of the People's Republic of China. He was posthumously honored by Chairman Mao and became an icon of self-sacrifice and noble character.
- Zhu De, one of the leaders of the Chinese Communist Party, Chinese communist government, and People's Liberation Army
- Li Jialong, singer and rapper, winner of Rap of China 2020.
