= List of Major National Historical and Cultural Sites in Sichuan =

This list is of Major Sites Protected for their Historical and Cultural Value at the National Level in the Province of Sichuan, People's Republic of China.

| Site | Chinese name | Location | Designation | Image |
|---|---|---|---|---|
| Luding Bridge | Luding qiao 泸定桥 | 29°54′52″N 102°13′49″E Luding County 泸定县 | 1-22 | Upload file |
| Huangze Temple Rock Sculptures | Huangze si moya zaoxiang 皇泽寺摩崖造像 | Guangyuan 广元市 | 1-43 | Upload file |
| Guangyuan Thousand Buddha Rock Sculptures | Guangyuan Qianfoya moya zaoxiang 广元千佛崖摩崖造像 | Guangyuan 广元市 | 1-44 | Upload file |
| Han Period Que in Qu County | Qu xian Han que 渠县汉阙 | Qu County 渠县 | 1-51 | Upload file |
| Que in Pingyang Prefecture | Pingyangfu jun que 平阳府君阙 | Mianyang 绵阳市 | 1-52 | Upload file |
| Que and Stone Carvings at the Grave Site of Gao Yi | Gao Yi mu que ji shike 高颐墓阙及石刻 | Ya'an 雅安市 | 1-56 | Upload file |
| Wuhou Temple (Zhu Geliang Temple) | Chengdu Wu hou ci 成都武侯祠 | Chengdu 成都市 | 1-119 | Upload file |
| Du Fu Thatched Cottage | Du Fu caotang 杜甫草堂 | Chengdu 成都市 | 1-120 | Upload file |
| Old Buildings of Mount Emei | Emei shan gu jianzhuqun 峨眉山古建筑群 | Emeishan 峨眉山市 | 1-133 | Upload file |
| Tomb of Wang Jian | Wang Jian mu 王建墓 | Chengdu 成都市 | 1-175 | Upload file |
| Leshan Giant Buddha | Leshan Dafo 乐山大佛 | 29°32′50″N 103°46′09″E Leshan 乐山市 | 2-13 | Upload file |
| Dujiangyan | Dujiangyan 都江堰 | Dujiangyan City | 2-36 | Upload file |
| Former Residence of Zhu De | Zhu De guju 朱德故居 | Yilong County 仪陇县 | 3-12 | Upload file |
| Monument to the Martyrs of the Railway Protection Movement | Xinhai Qiu Baolu Sishi Jinianbei 辛亥秋保路死事纪念碑 | Chengdu 成都市 | 3-19 | Upload file |
| Former Headquarters of the Fourth Front Army of the Red Army | Hongsi-Fangmianjun Zongzhihuibu jiuzhi 红四方面军总指挥部旧址 | Tongjiang County 通江县 | 3-33 | Upload file |
| Nankan Rock Sculptures | Nankan moya zaoxiang 南龛摩崖造像 | Bazhong 巴中市 | 3-47 | Upload file |
| Anyue Caves | Anyue shiku 安岳石窟 | Anyue County 安岳县 | 3-50 | Upload file |
| Shenhai Well | Shenhai jing 燊海井 | Zigong 自贡市 | 3-57 | Upload file |
| Zhuokeji Tusiguan Village | Zhuokeji tusiguan zhai 卓克基土司官寨 | Barkam County 马尔康县 | 3-72 | Upload file |
| Xiqin Guildhall | Xiqin huiguan 西秦会馆 | Zigong 自贡市 | 3-76 | Upload file |
| Fan Min Statue and Stele | Fan Min que ji shike 樊敏阙及石刻 | Lushan County 芦山县 | 3-100 | Upload file |
| Feilai Hall of the Great Temple | Damiao Feilai dian 大庙飞来殿 | Emeishan 峨眉山市 | 3-114 | Upload file |
| Yunyan Temple | Yunyan si 云岩寺 | Jiangyou 江油市 | 3-115 | Upload file |
| Sanxingdui Site | Sanxingdui yizhi 三星堆遗址 | 30°59′35″N 104°12′00″E Guanghan 广汉市 | 3-200 | Upload file |
| Shifangtang Qiong Kiln Site | Shifangtang Qiong yao yizhi 什邡堂邛窑遗址 | Qionglai 邛崃市 | 3-223 | Upload file |
| Mahao Rock Tomb | Mahao yamu 麻浩崖墓 | Leshan 乐山市 | 3-238 | Upload file |
| Hanging Coffins of Bo | Boren xuanguanzang (mu) 僰人悬棺葬(墓) | Gong County 珙县 | 3-249 | Upload file |
| Qijiang Rock Tombs | Qijiang yamuqun 郪江崖墓群 | Santai County 三台县 | 4-66 | Upload file |
| Ming Tombs of the Princes of Shu | Ming Shu wang ling 明蜀王陵 | Chengdu 成都市 | 4-76 | Upload file |
| Longnao Bridge | Longnao qiao 龙脑桥 | Lu County 泸县 | 4-79 | Upload file |
| Qiqushan Temple | Qiqushan damiao 七曲山大庙 | Zitong County 梓潼县 | 4-125 | Upload file |
| Bao'en Temple, Pingwu | Pingwu Bao'en si 平武报恩寺 | 32°24′40″N 104°31′48″E Pingwu County 平武县 | 4-156 | Upload file |
| Old Buildings on Zhenwushan | Zhenwushan gu jianzhuqun 真武山古建筑群 | Yibin 宜宾市 | 4-157 | Upload file |
| Zhang Huanhou Temple | Zhang Huanhou ci 张桓侯祠 | 30°54′44″N 108°41′57″E Langzhong 阆中市 | 4-158 | Upload file |
| Derge Parkhang | Dege yinjingguan 德格印经院 | 31°48′23″N 98°34′52″E Dêgê County 德格县 (Dêgê) | 4-183 | Upload file |
| Farmhouses of Xijiashan | Xijiashan minju 夕佳山民居 | Jiang'an County 江安县 | 4-184 | Upload file |
| Yang Sheng'an Ancestral Temple and Guihu Park | Yang Sheng'an ci ji Gui Hu 杨升庵祠及桂湖 | Chengdu 成都市 | 4-185 | Upload file |
| Residence of Liu Wencai | Liushi zhuangyuan 刘氏庄园 | Dayi County 大邑县 | 4-212 | Upload file |
| Old Distillery of Luzhou | Luzhou daqu laojiaochi 泸州大曲老窖池 | Luzhou 泸州市 | 4-249 | Upload file |
| Luojiaba Site | Luojiaba yizhi 罗家坝遗址 | Xuanhan County 宣汉县 | 5-103 | Upload file |
| Sites of the Prehistoric Cities of the Chengdu Plain | Chengdu Pingyuan shiqian chengzhi 成都平原史前城址 | Xinjin County 新津县 | 5-104 | Upload file |
| Shi'erqiao Site | Shi'er qiao yizhi 十二桥遗址 | Chengdu 成都市 | 5-105 | Upload file |
| Boat coffin tombs of Ancient Shu | Chengdu gu Shu chuanguan hezangmu 成都古蜀船棺合葬墓 | Chengdu 成都市 | 5-176 | Upload file |
| Rock Tombs of Jiangkou | Jiangkou yamu 江口崖墓 | Pengshan County 彭山县 | 5-177 | Upload file |
| An Bing Family Clan Tombs | An Bing jiazu mudi 安丙家族墓地 | Huaying 华蓥市 | 5-178 | Upload file |
| Baoguang Temple | Baoguang si 宝光寺 | Chengdu 成都市 | 5-383 | Upload file |
| Watch Towers in Zhibo | Zhibo diaolou 直波碉楼 | Barkam County 马尔康县 | 5-384 | Upload file |
| Sonte Pagoda of Shita Temple | Shita si shita 石塔寺石塔 | Qionglai 邛崃市 | 5-385 | Upload file |
| Old Town Walls of Songpan | Songpan gu chengqiang 松潘古城墙 | Songpan County 松潘县 | 5-386 | Upload file |
| Jueyuan Temple | Jueyuan si 觉苑寺 | Jiange County 剑阁县 | 5-387 | Upload file |
| Yong'an Temple, Langzhong | Langzhong Yong'an si 阆中永安寺 | Langzhong 阆中市 | 5-388 | Upload file |
| Wenchang Pavilion of Wulong Temple | Wulong miao Wenchang ge 五龙庙文昌阁 | Langzhong 阆中市 | 5-389 | Upload file |
| Shipaifang of Longchang | Longchang shipaifang 隆昌石牌坊 | Longchang County 隆昌县 | 5-390 | Upload file |
| Fushun Confucian Temple | Fushun wenmiao 富顺文庙 | Fushun County 富顺县 | 5-391 | Upload file |
| Guanyin Temple | Guanyin si 观音寺 | Xinjin County 新津县 | 5-392 | Upload file |
| Deyang Confucian Temple | Deyang wenmiao 德阳文庙 | Deyang 德阳市 | 5-393 | Upload file |
| Bangtuo Temple | Bangtuo si 棒托寺 | Zamtang County 壤塘县 | 5-394 | Upload file |
| Yanhua Pond | Yanhua chi 罨画池 | Chongzhou 崇州市 | 5-395 | Upload file |
| Carved Images of Vairocana Caves | Pilu dong shike zaoxiang 毗卢洞石刻造像 | Anyue County 安岳县 | 5-463 | Upload file |
| Former Residence of Deng Xiaoping | Deng Xiaoping guju 邓小平故居 | Guang'an 广安市 | 5-508 | Upload file |
| Shuijing Street Distillery Site | Shuijing jie jiufang yizhi 水井街酒坊遗址 | Chengdu 成都市 | 5-514 | Upload file |
| Yingpanshan and Jiangwei Sites | Yingpan shan he Jiangwei cheng yizhi 营盘山和姜维城遗址 | Mao County 茂县 | 6-177 | Upload file |
| Jinsha Site | Jinsha yizhi 金沙遗址 | 30°41′00″N 104°00′39″E Chengdu 成都市 | 6-178 | Upload file |
| Dayangdui Site | Dayangdui yizhi 大洋堆遗址 | Xichang 西昌市 | 6-179 | Upload file |
| Chengba Site | Chengba yizhi 城坝遗址 | Qu County 渠县 | 6-180 | Upload file |
| Jianmen Shudao Site | Jianmen Shudao yizhi 剑门蜀道遗址 | Guangyuan 广元市 | 6-181 | Upload file |
| Yandao Site | Yandao chengzhi 严道城址 | Yingjing County 荥经县 | 6-182 | Upload file |
| Laojunshan Saltpeter Cave Site | Laojun Shan xiaodong yizhi 老君山硝洞遗址 | Jiangyou 江油市 | 6-183 | Upload file |
| Jiannanchun Brewery Site | Jiannanchun jiufang yizhi 剑南春酒坊遗址 | Mianzhu 绵竹市 | 6-184 | Upload file |
| Liangshan Great Stone Tombs | Liangshan da shimuqun 凉山大石墓群 | Dechang County 德昌县 | 6-273 | Upload file |
| Ruifeng Rock Tombs | Ruifeng yamuqun 瑞峰崖墓群 | Qingshen County 青神县 | 6-274 | Upload file |
| Taliangzi Rock Tombs | Taliangzi yamuqun 塔梁子崖墓群 | Zhongjiang County 中江县 | 6-275 | Upload file |
| Huangsan Rock Tombs | Huangsan yamuqun 黄伞崖墓群 | Yibin County 宜宾县 | 6-276 | Upload file |
| Grave of Meng Zhixiang | Meng Zhixiang mu 孟知祥墓 | Chengdu 成都市 | 6-277 | Upload file |
| Shichengshan Rock Tombs | Shicheng shan yamuqun 石城山崖墓群 | Yibin County 宜宾县 | 6-278 | Upload file |
| Song Tombs in Lu County | Lu xian Song mu 泸县宋墓 | Lu County 泸县 | 6-279 | Upload file |
| Li Ye Que | Li Ye que 李业阙 | Zitong County 梓潼县 | 6-694 | Upload file |
| Yanggong Que | Yanggong que 杨公阙 | Jiajiang County 夹江县 | 6-695 | Upload file |
| Stone Pagoda of Yutaishan | Yutaishan shita 玉台山石塔 | Langzhong 阆中市 | 6-696 | Upload file |
| Old Watch Towers in Danba | Danba gudiaoqun 丹巴古碉群 | Danba County 丹巴县 | 6-697 | Upload file |
| Pengzhou Pagoda | Pengzhou Fota 彭州佛塔 | Pengzhou 彭州市 | 6-698 | Upload file |
| Wuliang Pagoda | Wuliang baota 无量宝塔 | Nanchong 南充市 | 6-699 | Upload file |
| Pagoda of Shengde Temple | Shengde si ta 圣德寺塔 | Jianyang 简阳市 | 6-700 | Upload file |
| Ruiguang Pagoda in Huaikou | Huaikou ruiguang ta 淮口瑞光塔 | Jintang County 金堂县 | 6-701 | Upload file |
| Pagoda of Jiufeng Temple | Jiufeng si ta 鹫峰寺塔 | Pengxi County 蓬溪县 | 6-702 | Upload file |
| Guangde Temple | Guangde si 广德寺 | Suining 遂宁市 | 6-703 | Upload file |
| Pingxiang Tower | Pingxiang lou 平襄楼 | Lushan County 芦山县 | 6-704 | Upload file |
| Main Hall of the Qinglong Temple | Lushan qinglong si dadian 芦山青龙寺大殿 | Lushan County 芦山县 | 6-705 | Upload file |
| Cuo'erji Temple | Cuo'erji si 措尔机寺 | Zamtang County 壤塘县 | 6-706 | Upload file |
| Risimanba Diaofang | Risimanba diaofang 日斯满巴碉房 | Zamtang County 壤塘县 | 6-707 | Upload file |
| Bao'en Temple, Meishan | Meishan bao'en ta 眉山报恩寺 | Meishan 眉山市 | 6-708 | Upload file |
| Lifeng Guan | Lifeng guan 醴峰观 | Nanbu County 南部县 | 6-709 | Upload file |
| Mumen Temple | Mumen si 木门寺 | Anyue County 安岳县 | 6-710 | Upload file |
| Xuanluo Hall | Xuanluo dian 旋螺殿 | Yibin 宜宾市 | 6-711 | Upload file |
| Main Hall of Kaishan Temple | Kaishan si zhengdian 开善寺正殿 | Yingjing County 荥经县 | 6-712 | Upload file |
| Baofan Temple | Baofan si 宝梵寺 | Pengxi County 蓬溪县 | 6-713 | Upload file |
| Qianwei Confucius Temple | Qianwei wenmiao 犍为文庙 | Qianwei County 犍为县 | 6-714 | Upload file |
| Gsumge Mani Stone Castle and Bage Mani Stone Wall | Songge mani shijing cheng he Bage mani shijing qiang 松格嘛呢石经城和巴格嘛呢石经墙 | Sêrxü County 石渠县 | 6-715 | Upload file |
| Aikou Stone Arch | Aikou shifang 隘口石坊 | Gong County 珙县 | 6-716 | Upload file |
| Old Architecture of Wangjianglou | Wangjianglou gu jianzhuqun 望江楼古建筑群 | Chengdu 成都市 | 6-717 | Upload file |
| Luodai Hall | Luodai huiguan 洛带会馆 | Chengdu 成都市 | 6-718 | Upload file |
| Spring and Autumn Temple | Chunqiu ci 春秋祠 | Xuyong County 叙永县 | 6-719 | Upload file |
| Bori Bridge | Bori qiao 波日桥 | Xinlong County 新龙县 | 6-720 | Upload file |
| Ancestral Hall and Grave of Pang Tong | Pang Tong ci mu 庞统祠墓 | Luojiang County 罗江县 | 6-721 | Upload file |
| Ancestral Hall of Three Su | San Su ci 三苏祠 | Meishan 眉山市 | 6-722 | Upload file |
| Memorial Arches of Kaijang | Kaijiang paifang 开江牌坊 | Kaijiang County 开江县 | 6-723 | Upload file |
| Shuangbao Memorial Arches | Shuangbao paifang 双堡牌坊 | Renshou County 仁寿县 | 6-724 | Upload file |
| Zizhong Confucian Temple and Temple of War | Zizhong Wenmiao he Wumiao 资中文庙和武庙 | Zizhong County 资中县 | 6-725 | Upload file |
| Study Platform of Chen Zi'ang | Chen Zi'ang dushu tai 陈子昂读书台 | Shehong County 射洪县 | 6-726 | Upload file |
| Baozhensai | Baozhensai 宝箴塞 | Wusheng County 武胜县 | 6-727 | Upload file |
| Pujiang Caves | Pujiang shiku 蒲江石窟 | Pujiang County 蒲江县 | 6-853 | Upload file |
| Qionglai Caves | Qionglai shiku 邛崃石窟 | Qionglai 邛崃市 | 6-854 | Upload file |
| Boshenwahei Rock Painting | Boshenwahei yanhua 博什瓦黑岩画 | Zhaojue County 昭觉县 | 6-855 | Upload file |
| Giant Buddha in Rong County | Rong xian Dafo shiku 荣县大佛石窟 | Rong County 荣县 | 6-856 | Upload file |
| Jiajiang Thousand Buddha Caves | Jiajiang Qianfo yanshiku 夹江千佛岩石窟 | Jiajiang County 夹江县 | 6-857 | Upload file |
| Tongjiang Thousand Buddha Caves | Tongjiang Qianfo yanshiku 通江千佛岩石窟 | Tongjiang County 通江县 | 6-858 | Upload file |
| Niujiaozhai Caves | Niujiaozhai shiku 牛角寨石窟 | Renshou County 仁寿县 | 6-859 | Upload file |
| Wolongshan Thousand Buddha Caves | Wolong shan Qianfo yanshiku 卧龙山千佛岩石窟 | Zitong County 梓潼县 | 6-860 | Upload file |
| Former Residence of Guo Moruo in Leshan | Leshan Guo Moruo guju 乐山郭沫若故居 | Leshan 乐山市 | 6-1037 | Upload file |
| Former Residence of Chen Yi | Chen Yi guju 陈毅故居 | Lezhi County 乐至县 | 6-1038 | Upload file |
| Annunciation Seminary | Lingbao xiuyuan 领报修院 | Bailu 白鹿鎭 | 6-1039 | Upload file |
| Former Residence of Wu Yuzhang | Wu Yuzhang guju 吴玉章故居 | Rong County 荣县 | 6-1040 | Upload file |
| Stone Carved Slogans of the Red Army in Tongjiang | Tongjiang Hongjun shike biaoyu qun 通江红军石刻标语群 | Tongjiang County 通江县 | 6-1041 | Upload file |
| Memorial Site of the Long March in Ngawa | Aba Hongjun changzheng yiji 阿坝红军长征遗迹 | Xiaojin County 小金县 | 6-1042 | Upload file |
| Beri Monastery | Baili si 白利寺 | Garzê County 甘孜县 | 6-1043 | Upload file |
| Former Residence of Zhang Lan | Zhang Lan jiuju 张澜旧居 | Nanchong 南充市 | 6-1044 | Upload file |
| Former Site of the Chinese Architectural Society | Zhongguo yingzao xueshe jiuzhi 中国营造学社旧址 | Yibin 宜宾市 | 6-1045 | Upload file |

== See also ==
- Principles for the Conservation of Heritage Sites in China
- International Dunhuang Project
