= Linshui County =

Linshui County 邻水县
- County
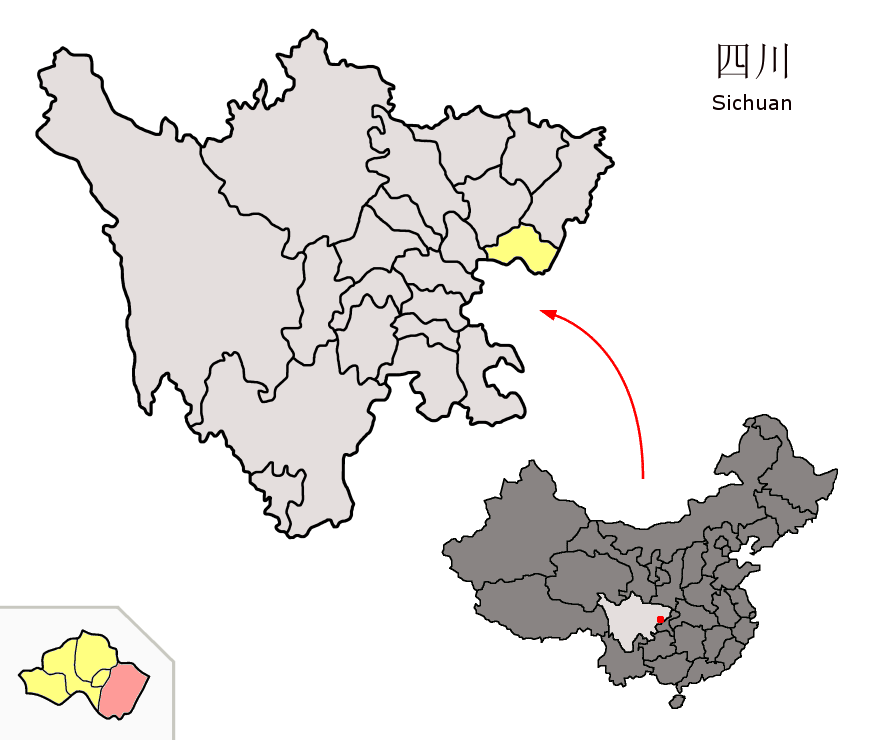
- Location of Linshui County (red) in Guang'an City (yellow) and Sichuan

- Location of the seat in Sichuan
- Coordinates: 30°17′N 106°59′E
- Country: China
- Province: Sichuan
- Prefecture-level city: Guang'an

Area
  - Total: 1,919.22 km^{2} (741.01 sq mi)

Population (2020)
  - Total: 707,537
  - Density: 368.659/km^{2} (954.821/sq mi)
- Time zone: UTC+8 (China Standard)
- Website: www.scls.gov.cn

Linshui County (simplified Chinese: 邻水县; traditional Chinese: 鄰水縣; pinyin: Línshuǐ Xiàn) is a county in the east of Sichuan province, China, administratively governed by the prefecture-level city of Guang'an; it is the easternmost county-level division of Guang'an, bordering Chongqing municipality to the east.

The county, which is not large, is accessible via a four-hour shuttle coach riding on the Chengnan expressway from Chengdu (Shiling public bus station) and a two-hour driving from the municipality city Chongqing on the south. The county is rich in natural resources, and has reservoirs of coal and sweet natural gas.

Strategically, Linshui County is on the only path out of Sichuan province in the east, as the connecting point between Dazhou and Chongqing. The local economy is largely dependent on livestock and agricultural farming.

== Administrative divisions ==
Linshui County comprises 25 towns:

- Dingping 鼎屏镇
- Chengbei 城北镇
- Chengnan 城南镇
- Ganzi 柑子镇
- Guanyinqiao 观音桥镇
- Moujia 牟家镇
- Heliu 合流镇
- Tantong 坛同镇
- Gaotan 高滩镇
- Jiulong 九龙镇
- Yulin 御临镇
- Yuanshi 袁市镇
- Fenghe 丰禾镇
- Ba'er 八耳镇
- Shiyong 石永镇
- Xingren 兴仁镇
- Wangjia 王家镇
- Shizi 石滓镇
- Sangu 三古镇
- Lianghe 两河镇
- Taihe 太和镇
- Chunmu 椿木镇
- Liangban 梁板镇
- Fusheng 复盛镇
- Lijia 黎家镇

== Transportation ==
Due to the peculiar local terrain—a series of parallel mountain ranges running in the SW to NE direction --, most roads in the area run in the valleys, also in the SW-NE direction. The G65 Baotou–Maoming Expressway runs through Linshui County, but no railway does. The closest railway to Linshui, the Xiangyang–Chongqing line, runs west of these ranges, outside of the county's borders; the closest railway station, in Huaying, is almost 30 km (19 mi) away by road, and has very limited service.

Plans exist for a high speed railway (Dazhou-Chongqing Intercity Railway, 达渝城际铁路) that would run from Chongqing to Dazhou, roughly parallel to the older Xiangyang–Chongqing Railway. In early May 2015, Linshui people learned that the railway would be routed (i.e. the valley in which it will run) was to be via Guang'an, hometown of Deng Xiaoping. Tens of thousands of residents marched in protest and were met by violent attacks by local police, including a Special Police Unit team, with two people reported dead. A violent reaction followed and the confrontation lasted all day and well into the night with many police cars damaged.

== Climate ==
Climate data for Linshui, elevation 392 m (1,286 ft), (1991–2020 normals, extremes 1981–present)
Month	Jan	Feb	Mar	Apr	May	Jun	Jul	Aug	Sep	Oct	Nov	Dec	Year
Record high °C (°F)	20.1 (68.2)	23.6 (74.5)	34.4 (93.9)	35.5 (95.9)	36.4 (97.5)	36.9 (98.4)	40.8 (105.4)	43.0 (109.4)	41.6 (106.9)	34.2 (93.6)	25.7 (78.3)	18.7 (65.7)	43.0 (109.4)
Mean daily maximum °C (°F)	9.2 (48.6)	12.2 (54.0)	17.2 (63.0)	22.7 (72.9)	26.2 (79.2)	28.9 (84.0)	32.6 (90.7)	32.9 (91.2)	27.5 (81.5)	21.3 (70.3)	16.3 (61.3)	10.3 (50.5)	21.4 (70.6)
Daily mean °C (°F)	6.3 (43.3)	8.6 (47.5)	12.6 (54.7)	17.6 (63.7)	21.2 (70.2)	24.2 (75.6)	27.3 (81.1)	27.2 (81.0)	22.9 (73.2)	17.6 (63.7)	12.9 (55.2)	7.7 (45.9)	17.2 (62.9)
Mean daily minimum °C (°F)	4.3 (39.7)	6.2 (43.2)	9.5 (49.1)	14.1 (57.4)	17.8 (64.0)	21.0 (69.8)	23.6 (74.5)	23.3 (73.9)	19.9 (67.8)	15.3 (59.5)	10.7 (51.3)	5.8 (42.4)	14.3 (57.7)
Record low °C (°F)	−2.5 (27.5)	−1.0 (30.2)	0.0 (32.0)	4.9 (40.8)	9.1 (48.4)	14.1 (57.4)	17.4 (63.3)	17.8 (64.0)	12.9 (55.2)	3.7 (38.7)	0.4 (32.7)	−3.3 (26.1)	−3.3 (26.1)
Average precipitation mm (inches)	19.5 (0.77)	24.0 (0.94)	55.2 (2.17)	103.2 (4.06)	173.0 (6.81)	205.5 (8.09)	179.5 (7.07)	137.5 (5.41)	133.0 (5.24)	105.2 (4.14)	55.2 (2.17)	21.4 (0.84)	1,212.2 (47.71)
Average precipitation days (≥ 0.1 mm)	10.5	9.9	11.9	13.9	15.9	15.7	12.7	11.3	12.9	16.1	11.9	11.3	154
Average snowy days	0.9	0.4	0	0	0	0	0	0	0	0	0	0.2	1.5
Average relative humidity (%)	86	82	79	79	81	83	79	76	82	87	87	88	82
Mean monthly sunshine hours	22.9	34.1	73.6	108.4	113.7	107.6	174.7	183.4	107.3	60.7	48.4	24.4	1,059.2
Percentage possible sunshine	7	11	20	28	27	26	41	45	29	17	15	8	23
Source: China Meteorological Administration all-time extreme temperature all-time January highall-time July high
