= Guang'an Metro =

Metro system in Guang'an, China

Overview
- Locale: Guang'an, Sichuan
- Transit type: Monorail rapid transit
- Number of lines: 1 (start); 2 (planned)
- Number of stations: 7 (start); 13 (planned)
- Website: Guang'an Sky Rail Transit; Official Weibo

Operation
- Operation will start: TBC (was due 2020)

Technical
- System length: 9.955 km (6.186 mi) (start)

Guang'an Metro or Guang'an Rail Transit (simplified Chinese: 广安轨道交通; traditional Chinese: 廣安軌道交通; pinyin: Guǎng'ān Guǐdào Jiāotōng) or Guang'an SkyRail is a light metro monorail system using BYD SkyRail monorail technology in Guang'an, Sichuan Province, China. The first line has been under construction since February 2017. The first line was planned to start test run in June 2020 and open in October 2020, however the testing schedule has been postponed.

A second line is planned.

== Lines under construction ==
Line	Terminals		Commencement	Length km	Stations
1	Guangmen (Guang'an)	Youkezhongxin (Guang'an)	October 2020	9.955	7
Metro lines total					26.1

Line 1 is north–south line. It will run between Guangmen and Youkezhongxin.

The line is currently under construction. It was announced that a planning to start test run would start in June 2020, and scheduled to open in October 2020. However, with several changes to the policy of constructing rapid transit systems, the original schedules are upset.

A northern extension for 5 stations is under planning.

== Planned ==
Line 2 is planned to be an east–west line through the Guang'an city with 6 stations and total length of 7.7 km (4.8 mi) long.
