= Zhongfeng Cave =

Limestone cave in China

- Zhongfeng Dong
- Location: Nuoshui River Town, Tongjiang County, Bazhong City, Sichuan Province

The Zhongfeng Cave (Chinese: 中峰洞), or Zhongfeng Dong, known as "underground karst museum", is a large limestone cave located in Nuoshui River Town, Tongjiang County, Bazhong City, Sichuan Province. In 2000, it was referred to as the "first cave in the all under heaven" by Zhu Xuejian, the then president of the Cave Research Society of China.

Zhongfeng Cave was formed 500 million years ago, and the main cave is 18 kilometers long, divided into three levels, with a total area of more than 800,000 square meters.
