= White Dagoba =

White Dagoba or Pagoda may refer to several prominent white stupas in China:

- White Pagoda of Liaoyang, Liaoning
- White Dagoba on Jade Flower Island in Beihai Park, Beijing
- White Dagoba in the Miaoying Temple, Beijing
- White Dagoba in Lianxing Temple, Yangzhou, Jiangsu
- Wuliang Pagoda in Nanchong City, Sichuan Province
