= Jiezi, Guang'an =

Jiezi 街子镇
- Town
- Jiezizhen
- Location in Sichuan
- Coordinates: 30°15′38″N 106°18′45″E
- Country: People's Republic of China
- Province: Sichuan
- Prefecture-level city: Guang'an
- County: Wusheng County

Area
  - Total: 30.92 km^{2} (11.94 sq mi)

Population (2010)
  - Total: 15,429
  - Density: 499.0/km^{2} (1,292/sq mi)
- Time zone: UTC+8 (China Standard)

Jiezi (Chinese: 街子镇) is a town in Wusheng County, Guang'an, Sichuan, China. In 2010, Jiezi had a total population of 15,429: 7,866 males and 7,563 females: 3,061 aged under 14, 10,248 aged between 15 and 65 and 2,120 aged over 65.
