= Yuechi County =

Yuechi County 岳池县
- County
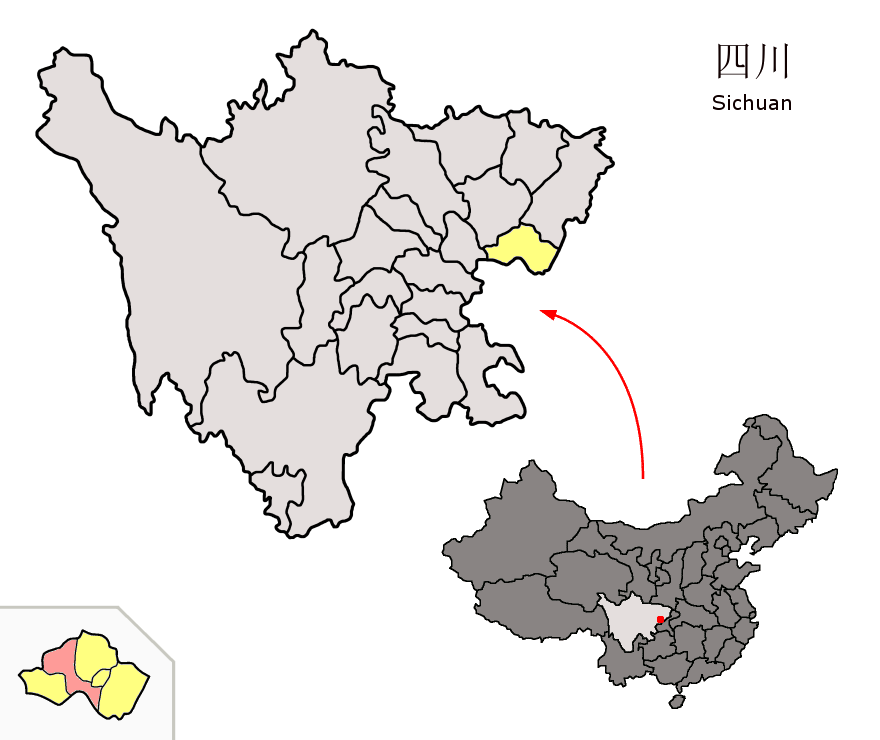
- Location of Yuechi County (red) within Guang'an City (yellow) and Sichuan
- Coordinates: 30°32′19″N 106°26′24″E
- Country: China
- Province: Sichuan
- Prefecture-level city: Guang'an
- County seat: Jiulong

Area
  - Total: 1,457 km^{2} (563 sq mi)

Population (2020 census)
  - Total: 742,747
  - Density: 509.8/km^{2} (1,320/sq mi)
- Time zone: UTC+8 (China Standard)

Yuechi County (Chinese: 岳池县; pinyin: Yuèchí Xiàn) is a county in the east of Sichuan province, China, bordering Chongqing Municipality to the south. It is administratively governed by the prefecture-level city of Guang'an.

The place is accessible by bus from Chengdu and Nanchong. The town is essentially sustained by its livestock and agricultural activities, as well as agriculture-based manufacturing like bamboo-based carpet and beancurd, etc.; virtually without the presence of any significant industries.

The town is planned and constructed with a main road plying the town center, linking the exit to the Chengnan expressway at one end and other suburban areas at the other.

== Administrative divisions ==
Yuechi County comprises 2 subdistricts, 23 towns and 2 townships:

subdistricts

- Jiulong 九龙街道
- Chaoyang 朝阳街道

towns

- Huayuan 花园镇
- Pingtan 坪滩镇
- Longkong 龙孔镇
- Zhenyu 镇裕镇
- Baimiao 白庙镇
- Youxi 酉溪镇
- Tongxing 同兴镇
- Xinglong 兴隆镇
- Qinxi 秦溪镇
- Guxian 顾县镇
- Goujiao 苟角镇
- Tianping 天平镇
- Shiya 石垭镇
- Qiaojia 乔家镇
- Luodu 罗渡镇
- Yumin 裕民镇
- Zhonghe 中和镇
- Xinchang 新场镇
- Pu'an 普安镇
- Linxi 临溪镇
- Xiban 西板镇
- Qifu 齐福镇
- Fulong 伏龙镇

townships

- Huanglong 黄龙乡
- Yufeng 鱼峰乡

== Climate ==
Climate data for Yuechi, elevation 404 m (1,325 ft), (1991–2020 normals, extremes 1981–present)
| Month | Jan | Feb | Mar | Apr | May | Jun | Jul | Aug | Sep | Oct | Nov | Dec | Year |
|---|---|---|---|---|---|---|---|---|---|---|---|---|---|
| Record high °C (°F) | 17.9 (64.2) | 21.8 (71.2) | 32.0 (89.6) | 34.7 (94.5) | 36.5 (97.7) | 36.5 (97.7) | 40.0 (104.0) | 42.0 (107.6) | 42.2 (108.0) | 33.8 (92.8) | 25.0 (77.0) | 18.2 (64.8) | 42.2 (108.0) |
| Mean daily maximum °C (°F) | 9.1 (48.4) | 12.1 (53.8) | 17.1 (62.8) | 22.6 (72.7) | 26.0 (78.8) | 28.3 (82.9) | 31.8 (89.2) | 32.2 (90.0) | 26.8 (80.2) | 20.8 (69.4) | 16.0 (60.8) | 10.2 (50.4) | 21.1 (69.9) |
| Daily mean °C (°F) | 6.2 (43.2) | 8.7 (47.7) | 12.9 (55.2) | 17.9 (64.2) | 21.4 (70.5) | 24.2 (75.6) | 27.2 (81.0) | 27.1 (80.8) | 22.7 (72.9) | 17.5 (63.5) | 12.9 (55.2) | 7.7 (45.9) | 17.2 (63.0) |
| Mean daily minimum °C (°F) | 4.0 (39.2) | 6.1 (43.0) | 9.7 (49.5) | 14.4 (57.9) | 18.1 (64.6) | 21.1 (70.0) | 23.7 (74.7) | 23.4 (74.1) | 19.9 (67.8) | 15.3 (59.5) | 10.6 (51.1) | 5.7 (42.3) | 14.3 (57.8) |
| Record low °C (°F) | −3.6 (25.5) | −1.1 (30.0) | −0.8 (30.6) | 4.1 (39.4) | 8.0 (46.4) | 13.6 (56.5) | 17.5 (63.5) | 17.1 (62.8) | 12.4 (54.3) | 2.0 (35.6) | 1.6 (34.9) | −3.3 (26.1) | −3.6 (25.5) |
| Average precipitation mm (inches) | 16.2 (0.64) | 19.4 (0.76) | 42.3 (1.67) | 84.4 (3.32) | 139.6 (5.50) | 163.4 (6.43) | 170.1 (6.70) | 135.9 (5.35) | 126.0 (4.96) | 92.0 (3.62) | 43.1 (1.70) | 18.1 (0.71) | 1,050.5 (41.36) |
| Average precipitation days (≥ 0.1 mm) | 9.9 | 8.7 | 10.3 | 12.6 | 15.1 | 15.4 | 12.1 | 11.1 | 13.5 | 15.8 | 10.9 | 9.3 | 144.7 |
| Average snowy days | 0.8 | 0.4 | 0 | 0 | 0 | 0 | 0 | 0 | 0 | 0 | 0 | 0.2 | 1.4 |
| Average relative humidity (%) | 86 | 81 | 77 | 77 | 78 | 83 | 80 | 77 | 82 | 86 | 86 | 87 | 82 |
| Mean monthly sunshine hours | 40.6 | 46.2 | 89.5 | 123.7 | 126.7 | 118.5 | 179.9 | 182.8 | 105.4 | 65.4 | 55.2 | 36.4 | 1,170.3 |
| Percentage possible sunshine | 13 | 15 | 24 | 32 | 30 | 28 | 42 | 45 | 29 | 19 | 17 | 12 | 26 |
Source: China Meteorological Administration
