= Qianwei Confucius Temple =

Confucian temple in Leshan, Sichuan, China

- 犍为文庙
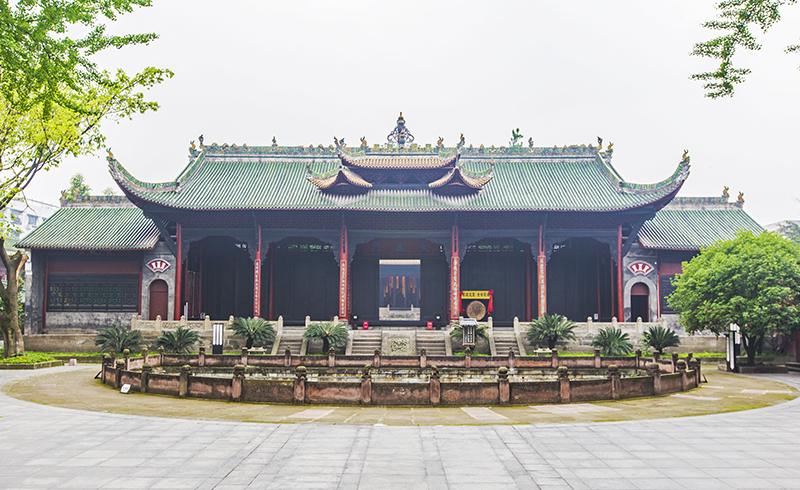

Religion
- Affiliation: Confucianism

Location
- Location: 297 South Street, Yujin Town
- Interactive map of Qianwei Confucius Temple

Qianwei Confucius Temple (simplified Chinese: 犍为文庙; traditional Chinese: 犍為文廟), or Qianwei Confucian Temple, is a Confucian temple located at No. 297 South Street, Yujin Town, Qianwei County, Leshan City, Sichuan Province.

Qianwei Confucius Temple is the largest Confucian temple in Sichuan, it covers an area of 43,333 square meters.

== History ==
Qianwei Confucius Temple was built during the Xiangfu periods of Emperor Zhenzong of the Northern Song dynasty (1008–1016), and has been rebuilt three times, relocated three times, and repaired twelve times during the Song, Yuan, Ming, and Qing dynasties and the Republic of China for more than 900 years.

== Conservation ==
In 2006, Qianwei Confucius Temple was listed as the sixth batch of Major Historical and Cultural Site Protected at the National Level in China.
