= Wusheng County =

Coordinates: 30°21′00″N 106°17′00″E

Wusheng County 武胜县
- County
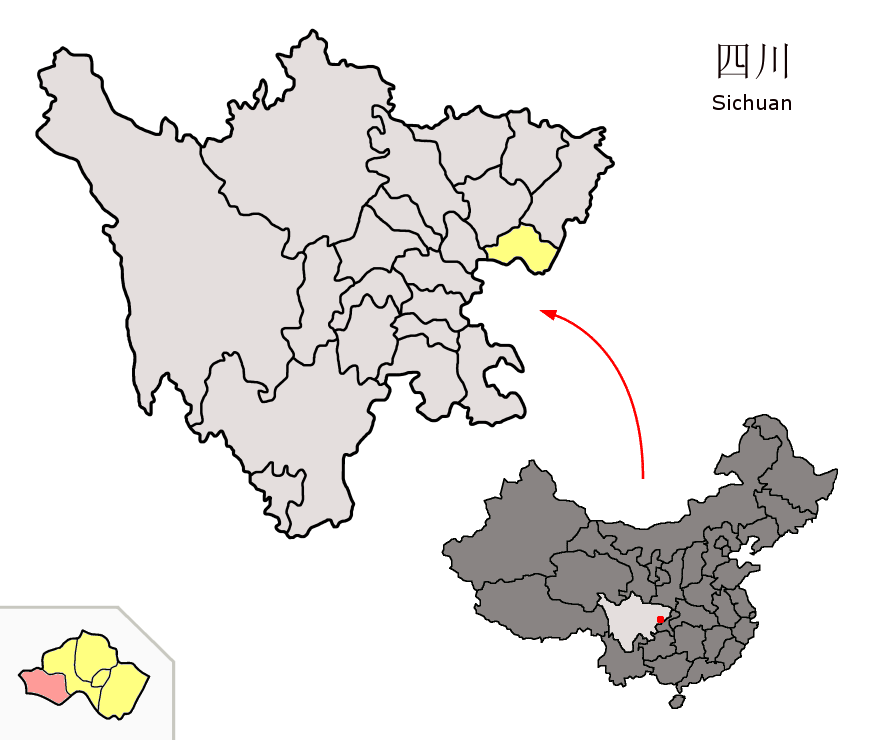
- Location of Wusheng County (red) within Guang'an City (yellow) and Sichuan
- Country: China
- Province: Sichuan
- Prefecture-level city: Guang'an

Area
  - Total: 966 km^{2} (373 sq mi)

Population (2020 census)
  - Total: 555,897
  - Density: 575/km^{2} (1,490/sq mi)
- Time zone: UTC+8 (China Standard)

Wusheng County (simplified Chinese: 武胜县; traditional Chinese: 武勝縣; pinyin: Wǔshèng Xiàn) is a county of Sichuan Province, China, bordering Chongqing to the south. It is locates in the southwest of the prefecture-level city of Guang'an and is its westernmost county-level division.

== Administrative divisions ==
Wusheng County comprises 19 towns and 4 townships:

towns

- Yankou 沿口镇
- Zhongxin 中心镇
- Liemian 烈面镇
- Feilong 飞龙镇
- Leshan 乐善镇
- Wanshan 万善镇
- Longnü 龙女镇
- Sanxi 三溪镇
- Saima 赛马镇
- Shengli 胜利镇
- Jinniu 金牛镇
- Qingping 清平镇
- Jiezi 街子镇
- Wanlong 万隆镇
- Li'an 礼安镇
- Huafeng 华封镇
- Baozhensai 宝箴塞镇
- Shipan 石盘镇
- Mingzhong 鸣钟镇

townships

- Zhenjing 真静乡
- Mengshan 猛山乡
- Shuangxing 双星乡
- Gujiang 鼓匠乡

pr==Climate==

Climate data for Wusheng, elevation 316 m (1,037 ft), (1991–2020 normals, extremes 1981–preset)
| Month | Jan | Feb | Mar | Apr | May | Jun | Jul | Aug | Sep | Oct | Nov | Dec | Year |
|---|---|---|---|---|---|---|---|---|---|---|---|---|---|
| Record high °C (°F) | 18.4 (65.1) | 22.8 (73.0) | 32.0 (89.6) | 35.4 (95.7) | 37.0 (98.6) | 37.9 (100.2) | 41.4 (106.5) | 42.1 (107.8) | 42.8 (109.0) | 35.5 (95.9) | 25.2 (77.4) | 17.9 (64.2) | 42.8 (109.0) |
| Mean daily maximum °C (°F) | 9.6 (49.3) | 12.7 (54.9) | 17.7 (63.9) | 23.2 (73.8) | 26.6 (79.9) | 28.9 (84.0) | 32.4 (90.3) | 32.8 (91.0) | 27.4 (81.3) | 21.3 (70.3) | 16.4 (61.5) | 10.7 (51.3) | 21.6 (71.0) |
| Daily mean °C (°F) | 6.8 (44.2) | 9.3 (48.7) | 13.5 (56.3) | 18.5 (65.3) | 22.0 (71.6) | 24.7 (76.5) | 27.9 (82.2) | 27.8 (82.0) | 23.3 (73.9) | 18.1 (64.6) | 13.4 (56.1) | 8.2 (46.8) | 17.8 (64.0) |
| Mean daily minimum °C (°F) | 4.7 (40.5) | 6.9 (44.4) | 10.4 (50.7) | 15.0 (59.0) | 18.6 (65.5) | 21.6 (70.9) | 24.4 (75.9) | 24.1 (75.4) | 20.5 (68.9) | 15.9 (60.6) | 11.3 (52.3) | 6.4 (43.5) | 15.0 (59.0) |
| Record low °C (°F) | −2.6 (27.3) | −0.1 (31.8) | 0.8 (33.4) | 5.1 (41.2) | 9.3 (48.7) | 14.1 (57.4) | 18.8 (65.8) | 16.7 (62.1) | 12.2 (54.0) | 3.6 (38.5) | 1.8 (35.2) | −2.7 (27.1) | −2.7 (27.1) |
| Average precipitation mm (inches) | 17.0 (0.67) | 20.0 (0.79) | 41.7 (1.64) | 81.7 (3.22) | 145.9 (5.74) | 172.7 (6.80) | 167.2 (6.58) | 125.9 (4.96) | 129.5 (5.10) | 90.7 (3.57) | 40.2 (1.58) | 19.6 (0.77) | 1,052.1 (41.42) |
| Average precipitation days (≥ 0.1 mm) | 10.7 | 9.1 | 10.9 | 12.7 | 15.1 | 15.5 | 12.0 | 10.9 | 13.7 | 16.3 | 11.5 | 10.8 | 149.2 |
| Average snowy days | 0.5 | 0.3 | 0 | 0 | 0 | 0 | 0 | 0 | 0 | 0 | 0 | 0.1 | 0.9 |
| Average relative humidity (%) | 87 | 83 | 78 | 78 | 79 | 84 | 81 | 76 | 83 | 88 | 88 | 89 | 83 |
| Mean monthly sunshine hours | 38.0 | 50.6 | 95.3 | 128.3 | 130.7 | 120.6 | 184.9 | 193.4 | 112.9 | 67.0 | 53.2 | 31.4 | 1,206.3 |
| Percentage possible sunshine | 12 | 16 | 25 | 33 | 31 | 29 | 43 | 48 | 31 | 19 | 17 | 10 | 26 |
Source: China Meteorological Administrationall-time July high
