= Guang'an District, Guang'an =

Guang'an 广安区
- District
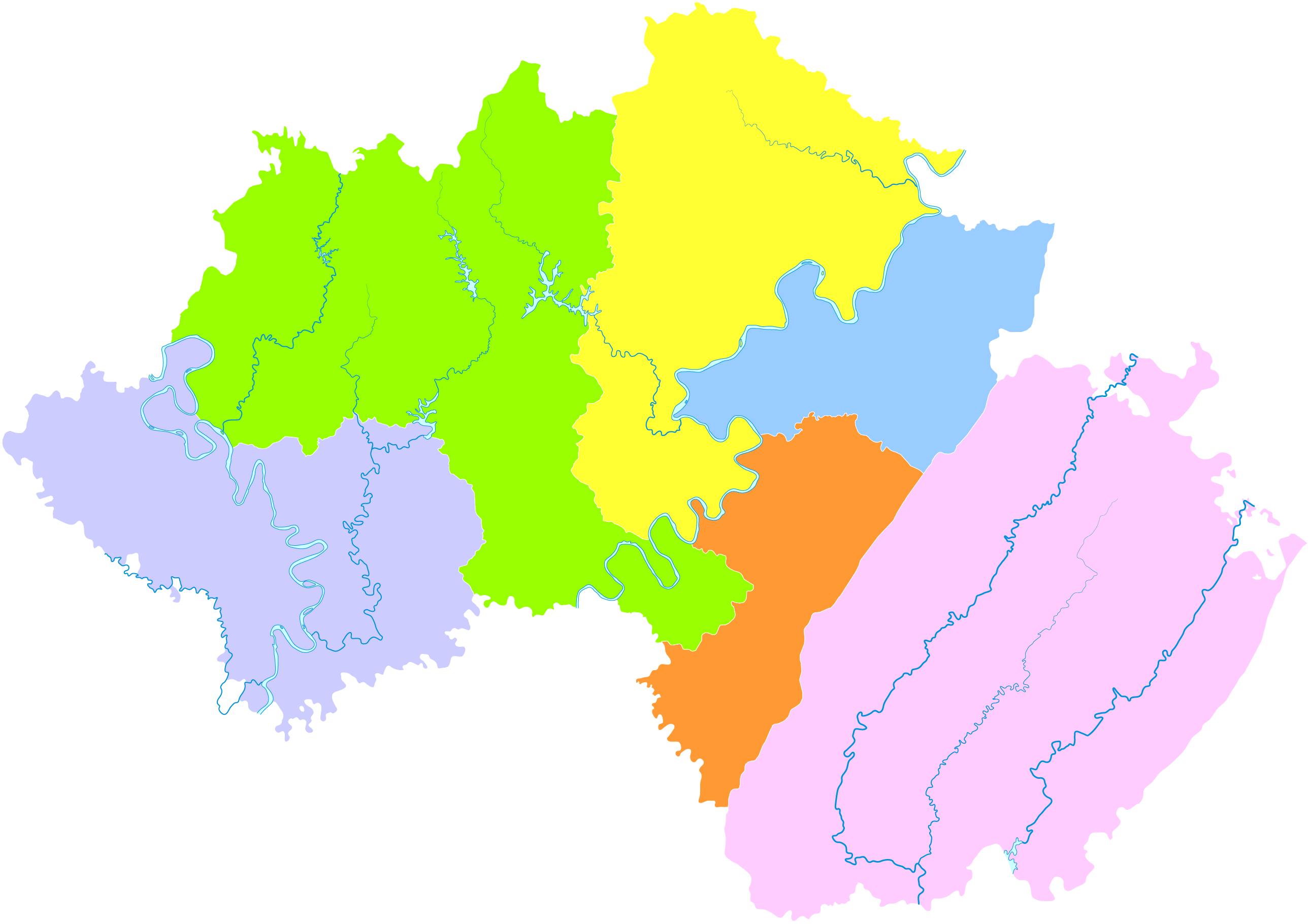
- Guang'an District is the northernmost division on this map of Guang'an City

- Guang'an City in Sichuan
- Coordinates: 30°28′27″N 106°38′29″E
- Country: China
- Province: Sichuan
- Prefecture-level city: Guang'an
- District seat: Guangfu Subdistrict

Area
  - Total: 1,030 km^{2} (400 sq mi)

Population (2020 census)
  - Total: 744,115
  - Density: 722/km^{2} (1,870/sq mi)
- Time zone: UTC+8 (China Standard)
- Website: www.guanganqu.gov.cn

Guang'an District (simplified Chinese: 广安区; traditional Chinese: 廣安區; pinyin: Guǎng'ān Qū) is a district of the city of Guang'an, Sichuan province, China. It is one of two urban districts of the city.

== Administrative divisions ==
Guang'an District administers 6 subdistricts, 13 towns, and 3 townships:

- Nonghui Subdistrict (浓洄街道)
- Beichen Subdistrict (北辰街道)
- Guangfu Subdistrict (广福街道)
- Wansheng Subdistrict (万盛街道)
- Zhongqiao Subdistrict (中桥街道)
- Zaoshan Subdistrict (枣山街道)
- Guansheng Town (官盛镇)
- Xiexing Town (协兴镇)
- Nongxi Town (浓溪镇)
- Yuelai Town (悦来镇)
- Xingping Town (兴平镇)
- Jinghe Town (井河镇)
- Huaqiao Town (花桥镇)
- Longtai Town (龙台镇)
- Xiaoxi Town (肖溪镇)
- Hengsheng Town (恒升镇)
- Shisun Town (石笋镇)
- Baishi Town (白市镇)
- Da'an Town (大安镇)
- Chuanshi Town (穿石镇)
- Dalong Town (大龙镇)
- Dongyue Town (东岳镇)
- Long'an Township (龙安乡)
- Pengjia Township (彭家乡)
- Baima Township (白马乡)

== Characteristics ==
It is renowned as the birthplace and former residence of Deng Xiaoping, widely regarded as the chief designer for modern Chinese economy since 1978.
