= Qiqushan Temple =

Temple in China

- 七曲山大庙
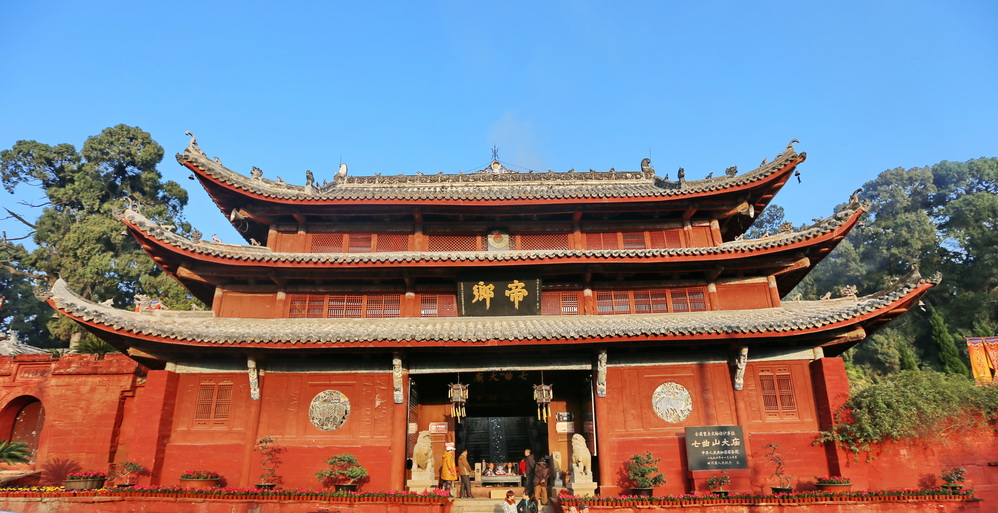
- A front view of the temple

- Location of the temple in Sichuan

Religion
- Affiliation: Taoism
- Ecclesiastical or organizational status: Temple
- Status: Active

Location
- Location: 2 Cuiyunlang Road, Zitong County, Mianyang City, Sichuan
- Country: China
- Interactive map of Qiqushan Temple
- Coordinates: 31°41′50″N 105°11′35″E

Architecture
- Type: Temple
- Style: Traditional Chinese

Specifications
- Interior area: c.12,000–13,000 m^{2} (130,000–140,000 sq ft)
- Site area: 5,611 m^{2} (60,400 sq ft)

The Qiqushan Temple (Chinese: 七曲山大庙; pinyin: Qīqūshān dà miào), also known as the Qiqu Mountain Great Temple, is a Taoist temple, located in Zitong county of Mianyang City, in the Sichuan province of China. The Qiqushan Temple is located on a mountain about a few kilometers away from Zhangtong County, Mianyang City.

== Overview ==
It has a beautiful surrounding environment and is lined with trees. The ancient building complex of Qiqu Mountain Great Temple integrates the architecture of Yuan, Ming and Qing dynasties.

There are 23 halls and attics spread over 13,000 square metres (140,000 sq ft), within a 5,611-square-metre (60,400 sq ft) site. The temple architecture cleverly used the topography of the site and was built on a hill, and was not bound by the tradition of parallel central axis, showing a flexible and natural style. The entire temple is exquisitely designed, with stilts on the ridges, sloping corners and volleys. The layers of the pavilions are staggered, with unique carved beams and building designs. There are both majestic palace-style buildings in the north and small and exquisite garden-style buildings in the south.

== History ==
The large temple was built in Eastern Jin Dynasty. It was originally named as "Yazi Temple", dedicated to Zhang Yazi. In the early Yuan dynasty, Zhang Yazi was named "Emperor Wenchang" and the temple was rebuilt as Wenchang Palace. There are more than 20,000 ancient cypresses next to the temple.

== See also ==
- Taoism in China
