= Wuliang Pagoda =

Pagoda in Nanchong, Sichuan, China

- 白塔
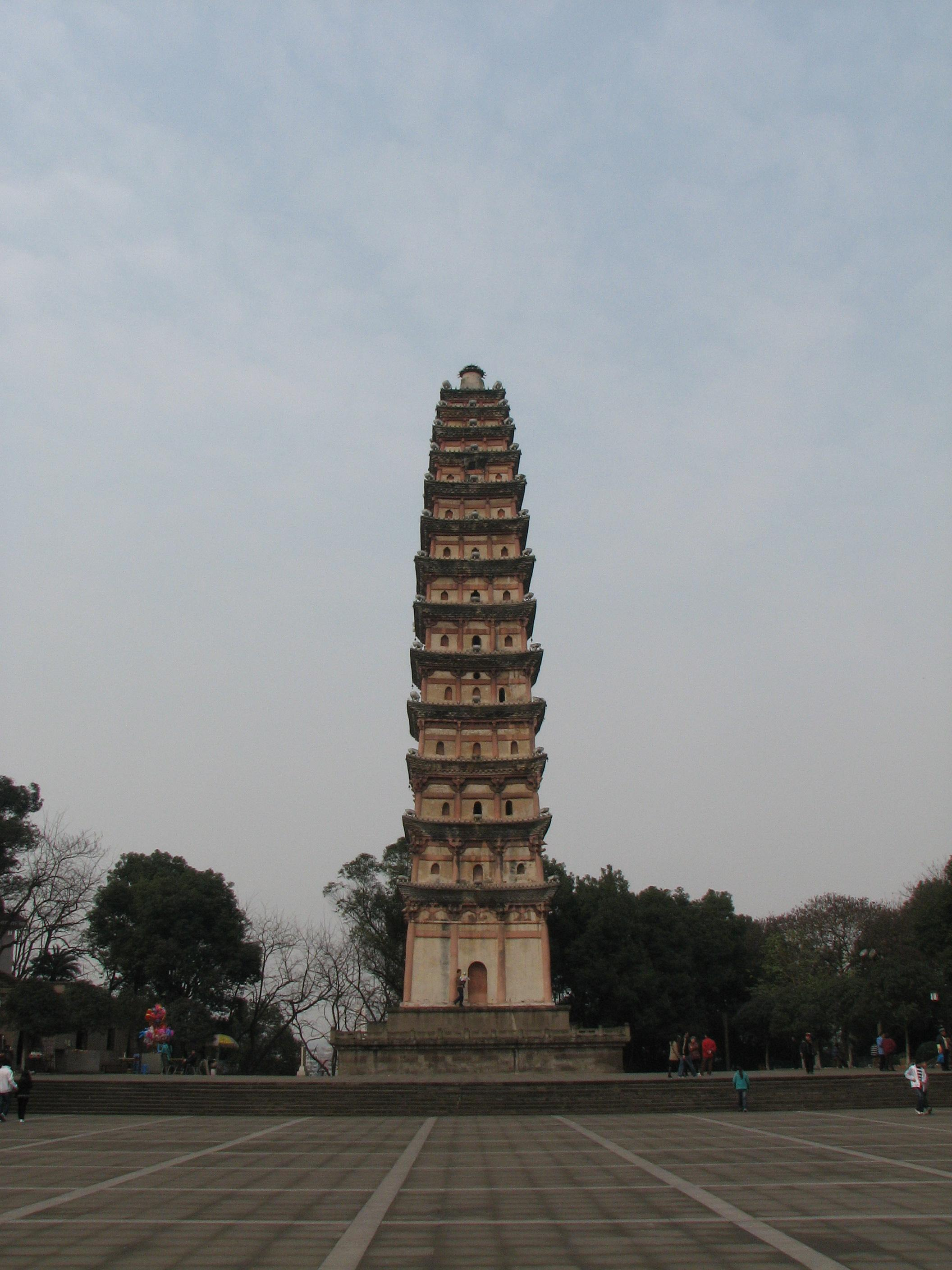
- The east side of the Wuliang Pagoda

- Location within Sichuan

General information
- Architectural style: Pavilion-style square brick tower
- Location: Sichuan ProvinceNanchong, China
- Coordinates: 30°47′15″N 106°05′49″E
- Elevation: 179 m (587 ft)

Height
- Height: 39.56 m (129.8 ft)

Technical details
- Floor count: 13

Wuliang Pagoda, also known as White Pagoda, is an imitation wooden pavilion-style brick pagoda located on Heming Mountain on the bank of the Jialing River in Gaoping District, Nanchong City, Sichuan Province, facing Shunqing District, Nanchong City across the river. The date of construction is controversial, which may be the late Tang Dynasty, the Five Dynasties or the Two Song Dynasties. On July 13, 1961, it was announced as the second batch of historical and revolutionary cultural relics protection units in Sichuan Province. On July 7, 1980, it was re-announced as the first batch of cultural relics protection units in Sichuan Province. On May 25, 2006, because the tower was "a brick building from the Five Dynasties to the early Song Dynasty with the style of Tang Pagoda, it was the earliest and large in volume among the Song Pagodas in Sichuan. It was the first tower in the Song Dynasty in Sichuan and a precious heritage of the study of the transition from the Tang Pagoda to the Song Dynasty", it was announced as the sixth batch of national key cultural relics protection units.

It is one of the Major National Historical and Cultural Sites in Sichuan.

== Year of construction ==
The date of construction of the Wuliang Pagoda is unknown, and there is no record of the Republic of China. Modern experts have given different opinions on the construction of the pagoda from the late Tang Dynasty to the Southern Song Dynasty according to the architectural style, structure and decoration techniques of the pagoda.

First, constructed during the late Tang to Five Dynasties period: "From its exterior, this pagoda exhibits the architectural style of the Tang Dynasty. In terms of decorative details, the waist eaves feature inward-curving horizontal defensive lines, forming graceful curves. The pagoda has a square floor plan, with brick-built dougong (interlocking wooden brackets) that are large and robust. Based on this, it can be inferred that the Nanchong White Pagoda is unlikely to be a Northern Song structure but rather dates back to the Tang or Five Dynasties period before the Song Dynasty. The internal structural features of the Nanchong White Pagoda also confirm that it was constructed during the transitional period between the Tang and Song Dynasties."

Second, constructed during the Jianlong era of Emperor Taizu of the Northern Song Dynasty: Based on the six characters "Jianlong Wanshou Pagoda" inscribed on the plaque of the tenth level on the east side of the pagoda, the *Newly Compiled Nanchong County Gazetteer* from the Republican period affirms this dating. This is the primary viewpoint regarding the dating of the Nanchong White Pagoda.

Third, constructed in the mid-to-late Southern Song Dynasty, most likely around the Jiading era: "By analyzing the architectural features of the Nanchong White Pagoda that imitate wooden structures and comparing them with the wooden-style forms of brick and stone pagodas in the same region during the same period, it is evident that the pagoda exhibits a high degree of asymmetry and ornamentation. Considering transportation routes and historical context, it is inferred that the pagoda was built in the mid-to-late Southern Song Dynasty, most likely around the Jiading era."

== Outward appearance ==
The White Pagoda now stands on a platform built of stone blocks, originally designed as a Sumeru pedestal adorned with carved dragon-scale patterns around its perimeter. The pagoda body above the platform is constructed of blue bricks with a square floor plan, consisting of 13 levels and reaching a height of 39.56 meters. The entire exterior of the pagoda is coated in grayish-white plaster, and the brickwork features imitation wooden columns, dougong (interlocking brackets), and beams, all painted with an earthy yellow pigment. Copper bells hang beneath the eaves of each level of the pagoda.

The finial of the pagoda is an iron-cast, millstone-shaped component, circular on the outside and hollow in the center.

Below the eaves, each side of the pagoda features a brick structure with four columns and three bays. The main bay on the first level contains an arched door providing entry from the west side, while the other three sides house niches. From the second to the tenth levels, the main bay contains doors, while the secondary bays have windows. The doors and windows are either arched or wedge-shaped. Except for those connected to the interior chambers and corridors, most are decorative niches. In total, the pagoda contains 93 small niches, 10 doors, and 9 windows.

The wall surfaces feature brick imitations of columns, beams, and dougong (interlocking brackets), realistically replicating the structure of wooden architecture with a complex and varied design. The tops of the columns have noticeable entasis. Below the third level, the architraves resemble round wooden beams, supporting four-stepped single brackets or single cantilever arms. The cantilever arms have a guqin-shaped top surface, with upward-curving undersides, ending in decorative elements resembling bamboo shoots or cup-shaped heads.

Notably, only the first level features "pupai beams" (horizontal beams connecting brackets), above which camel hump-shaped blocks support intermediate brackets. These camel humps are intricately carved. Above the third level, the cross-sections of the architraves become rectangular, and the dougong and other imitated wooden architectural details become progressively simplified with each level. Neither the architraves nor the pupai beams extend beyond the wall surface.

== Internal structure ==
There are two main descriptions of the internal structure of the Nanchong White Pagoda:

1. First Description: "The lower four levels of the pagoda contain a solid central pillar, around which circular brick staircases are constructed, allowing people to ascend. To ensure sufficient sunlight, ventilation, and ease of access, two circular and one irregularly shaped rectangular openings were built in certain parts of the pagoda. Above the fourth level, the top is constructed using the 'diése' (corbeling) technique with bricks, allowing climbers to ascend to the top by gripping the corbeled brick steps."

2. Second Description: "In levels 1 to 5, the central core comprises a central pillar, with the third level being solid while the others feature chambers within the core. The central chamber includes arched doors and ceilings decorated with four-slope caisson designs. A winding brick staircase runs along the outer wall of the central pillar, allowing access to the fifth level. From the ceiling of the central chamber on the fifth level to the tenth level, the interior is hollow, forming a tubular space that tapers from a wider base to a narrower top. Levels 10 to 13 return to being solid."

== Renovate ==
There are records of four major repairs to the White Pagoda:

1. In the 14th year of the Chongzhen era of the Ming Dynasty (1641), the pagoda's foundation was rebuilt, and the steps were widened.

2. In 1981, the base of the pagoda was repaired, and the weathered and damaged dragon-scale relief carvings at the four corners of the foundation were replaced.

3. In 1995, repairs were made to cracks in the pagoda body and its finial.

4. In 2010, modern lighting fixtures on the pagoda were removed.

== Gallery ==
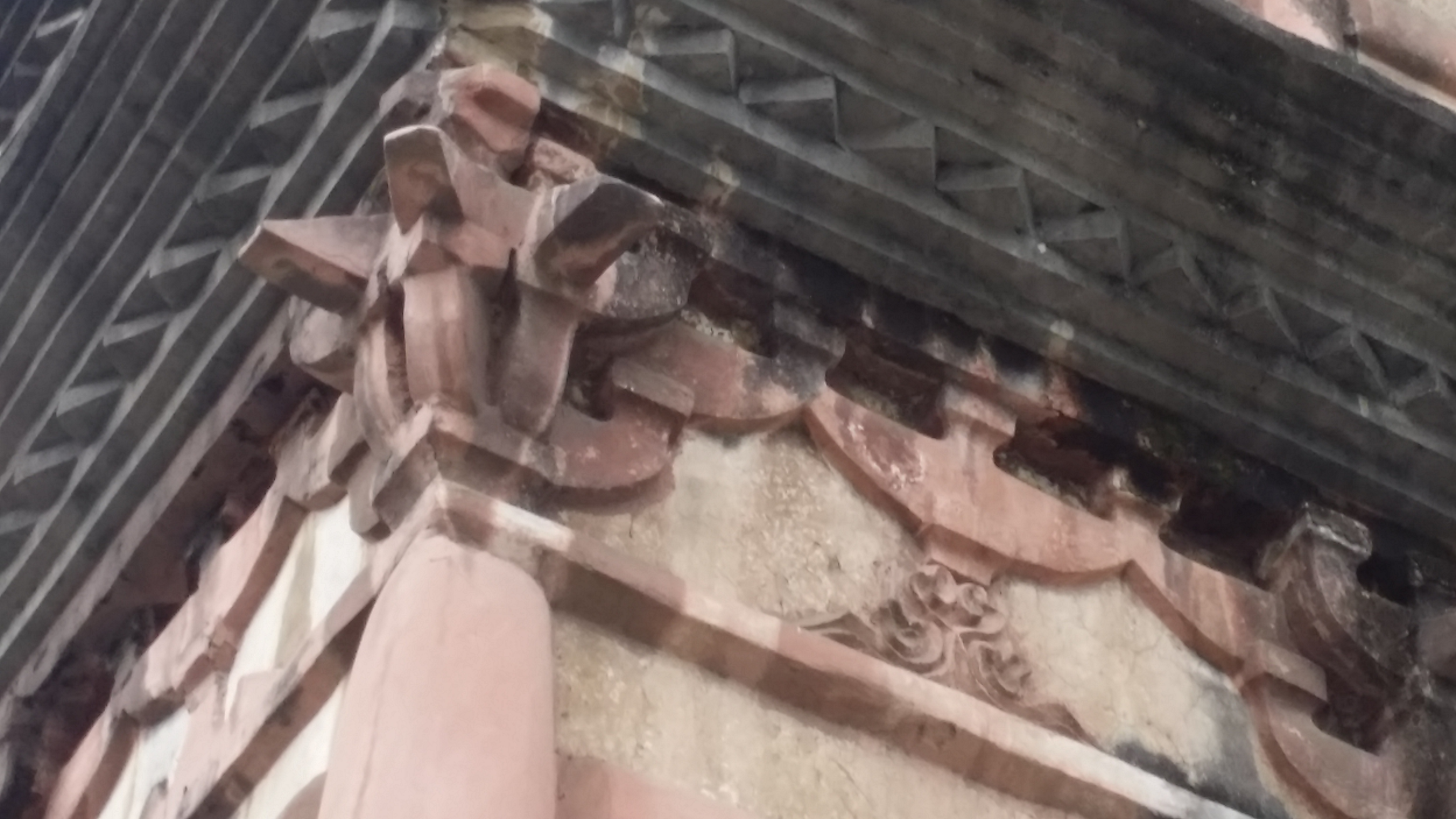
Detail

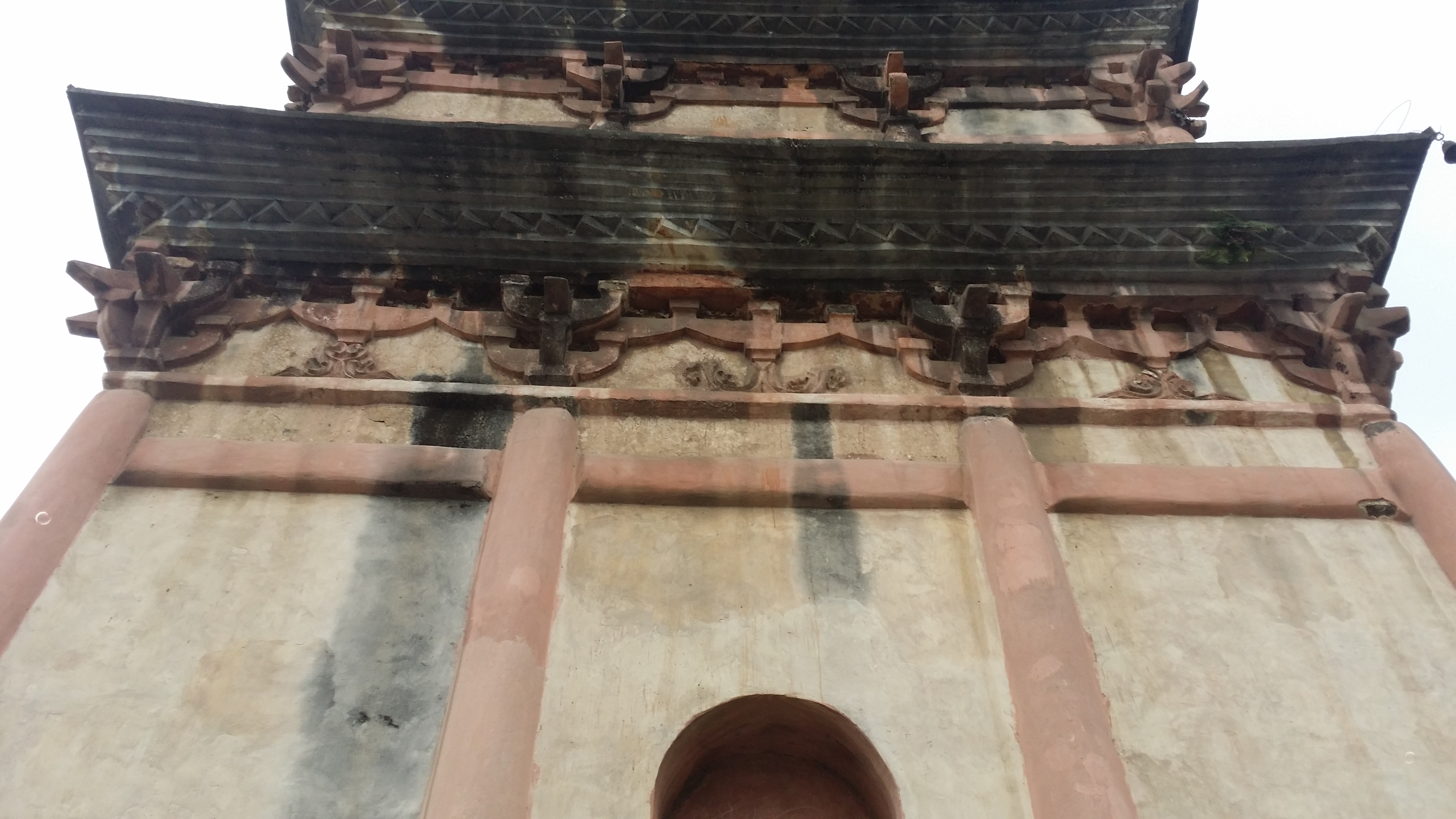
The east side of the tower

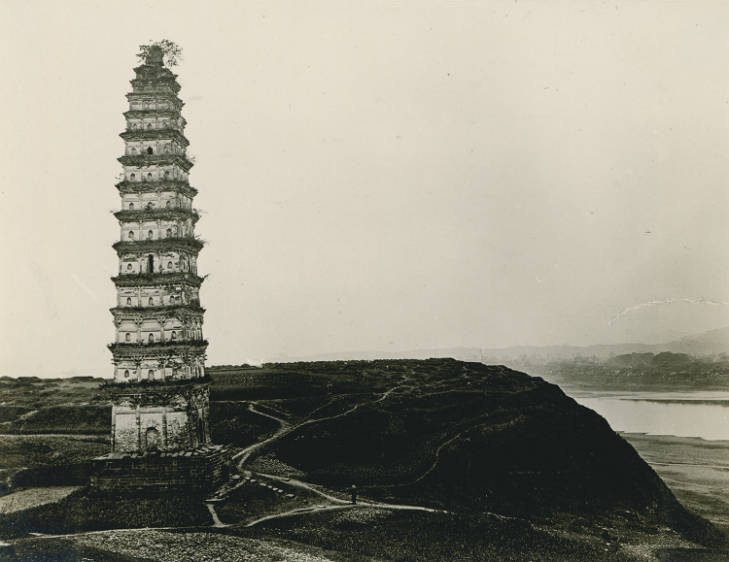
Photo taken by American geographer Zhang Berlin on March 28, 1909
