= Former residence of Deng Xiaoping =

Historic site

Former Residence of Deng Xiaoping
- 邓小平故居
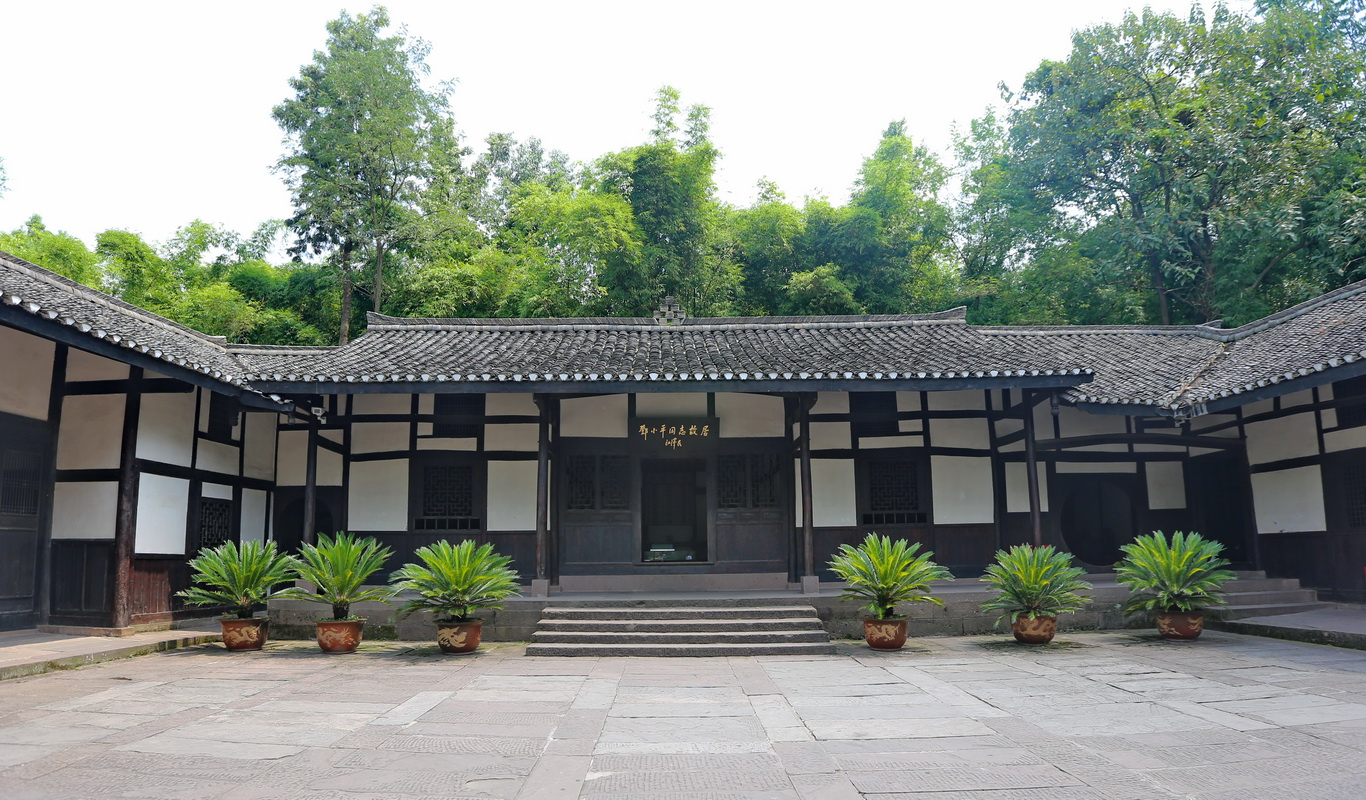
- Former Residence of Deng Xiaoping

- Location within Sichuan Location within China

General information
- Type: Traditional folk houses
- Architectural style: Chinese architecture
- Location: Xiexing Town, Guang'an District, Guang'an, Sichuan, China
- Coordinates: 30.524461°N 106.643809°E
- Owner: Government of Guang'an

Technical details
- Floor area: 833.4 m^{2} (8,971 sq ft)

The former residence of Deng Xiaoping (simplified Chinese: 邓小平故居; traditional Chinese: 鄧小平故居; pinyin: Dèng Xiǎopíng Gùjū) was built in the late Qing dynasty (19th century). It is located in Paifang village of Xiexing town, Guang'an District, Guang'an City, Sichuan, China. It has a building area of about 833.4 m^{2} (8,971 sq ft), including buildings such as the old houses, the statue of Deng Xiaoping, the Dezheng Place (德政坊), the Cultural relics Exhibition Hall, the Hanlin Yard (翰林院子).

On June 25, 2001, it was listed as a major cultural heritage site under national-level protection.

== Memorial Hall ==
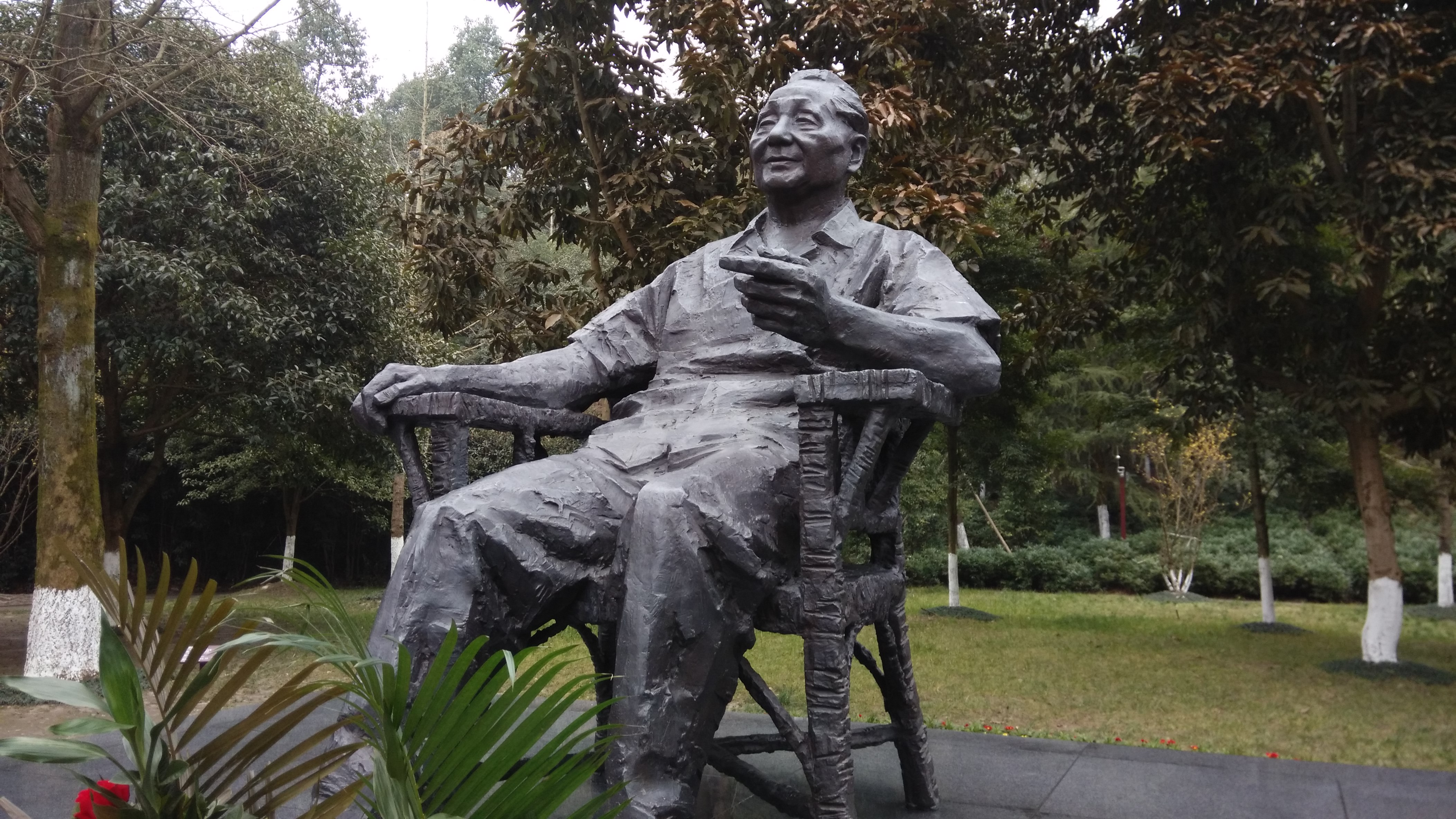
Sculpture of Deng Xiaoping in the Memorial Hall

In the late Qing dynasty (19th century), the house was built by Deng Xiaoping's great-grandfather Deng Xinzao (邓心早) and grandfather Deng Keda (邓克达). Deng Xiaoping was born here on 22 August 1904, in the 37th year of the Guangxu reign. He lived here for about 15 years.

The Central Committee of the Chinese Communist Party (CCP) approved the construction of "Deng Xiaoping's Residence Exhibition Hall" to commemorate the centenary of Deng Xiaoping's birth. The museum covers an area of 10 acres with a building area of 3,800 square meters. The architectural elements of the museum are a combination of eastern Sichuan folk style and modern architectural style. The exterior of the museum is simple, reflecting Deng Xiaoping's unassuming character. On the right side, there are three sloping roofs in a staggered pattern, symbolizing Deng Xiaoping's revolutionary journey of "three falls and three rises". In the middle, a high wall towers up to the sky, implying that Deng Xiaoping's great achievements have set up an immortal monument in the history of mankind, and also indicating that the Chinese people will carry out the cause of socialist modernization with Chinese characteristics to the end with a clear banner.

The whole architectural design from the slope to the monument, and from the monument to the slope, implying that Deng Xiaoping from ordinary to great, and from greatness back to ordinary meaning. In terms of building materials, granite and teak were used to symbolize Deng Xiaoping's strong and flexible character. On August 13, 2004, the museum was officially inaugurated, and Hu Jintao, the General Secretary of the Chinese Communist Party and the President of China, visited the museum and delivered a speech.

The exhibition hall of Deng Xiaoping's former residence consists of a prelude hall, three display halls, a collection hall, a movie screening hall and related ancillary facilities. The exhibition introduces the advanced display concept of international museums, with the theme of "I am a son of the Chinese people", displaying 170 precious relics, 408 pictures, more than 200 documents, 4 replica scenes, and 6.2 million words of multimedia, combining the high-tech means of sound, light, and electricity, to reproduce Deng Xiaoping's life. The exhibition won the special award of the Sixth National Museum System Top Ten Fine Display Exhibitions on May 17, 2005, and was awarded the "Special Prize" of the Sixth National Museum System Top Ten Fine Display Exhibitions.

== Protection ==
In July 1997, it was listed as a National Patriotic Education Base by the Central Publicity Department of the Chinese Communist Party. In February 1998, the General Secretary of the Chinese Communist Party Jiang Zemin wrote "Deng Xiaoping's Former Residence" on the horizontal tablet. On 25 June 2001, it was listed as a major cultural heritage site under national-level protection by the State Council of China. On 13 August 2004, the CCP general secretary Hu Jintao attended the unveiling of the statue of Deng Xiaoping. In May 2008, Deng Xiaoping's former residence was awarded the first batch of national-level museums by the State Administration of Cultural Heritage.
