= Zitong County =

Zitong County 梓潼县
- County
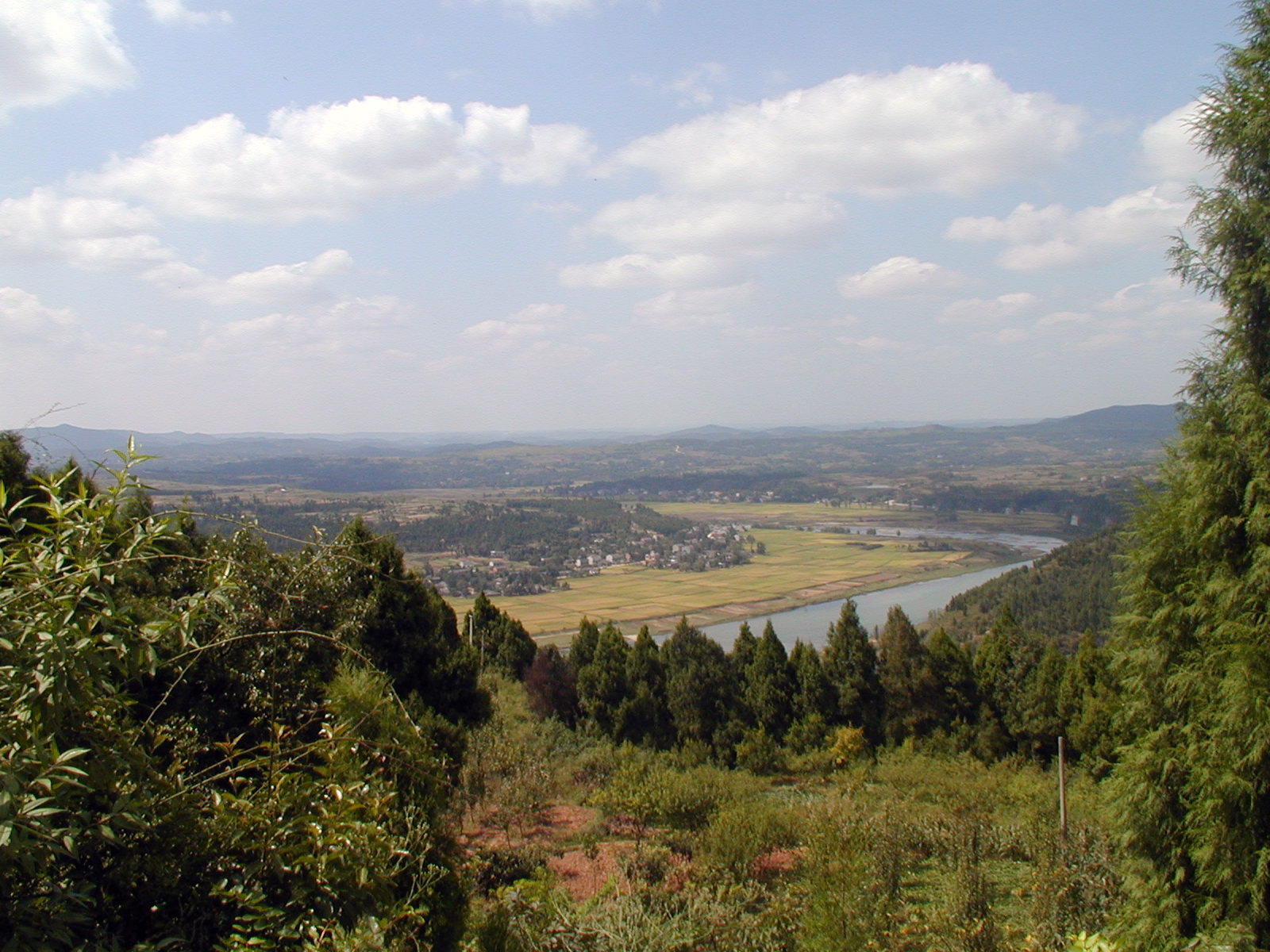
- Zitong Panoramic; 31.63211769254885°N 105.1589985519027°E

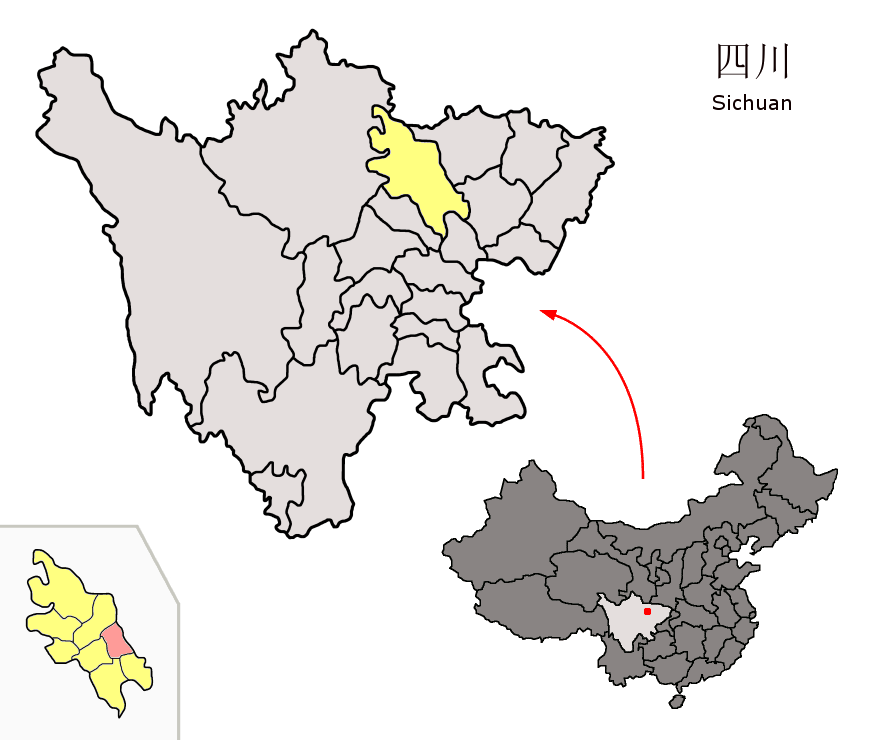
- Location of Zitong County (red) within Mianyang City (yellow) and Sichuan
- Coordinates: 31°38′35″N 105°10′16″E
- Country: China
- Province: Sichuan
- Prefecture-level city: Mianyang

Area
  - Total: 1,438 km^{2} (555 sq mi)

Population (2018)
  - Total: 309,000
  - Density: 215/km^{2} (557/sq mi)
- Time zone: UTC+8 (China Standard)

Zitong County (Chinese: 梓潼县; pinyin: Zǐtóng Xiàn) is a county in the northeast of Sichuan Province, China. It is under the administration of the prefecture-level city of Mianyang.

It has an area of 1,438 km^{2} (555 sq mi), and a population of 380,000 in 2002. Its seat is 172 km (107 mi) from Chengdu, and 49 km (30 mi) from Mianyang. It was made a county as early as B.C. 285, in Qin Dynasty.

Famous people include: Sima Xiangru, Pu Fuzhou, Hai Deng, Li Youxing.

== Administrative divisions ==
Zitong County comprises 15 towns and 1 township:

towns

- Wenchang 文昌镇
- Changqing 长卿镇
- Xuzhou 许州镇
- Liya 黎雅镇
- Wolong 卧龙镇
- Guanyi 观义镇
- Manao 玛瑙镇
- Shiniu 石牛镇
- Ziqiang 自强镇
- Renhe 仁和镇
- Shuangban 双板镇
- Jinlong 金龙镇
- Wenxing 文兴镇
- Yanwu 演武镇
- Hongren 宏仁镇

township

- Baoshi 宝石乡

== Historical sites ==
Zitong has three historical sites listed in the official list of Chinese national historic sites.:

- Qiqushan temple (Qiqushan damiao, 七曲山大庙)
- Liye tower (Liye que, 李业阙)
- Wolongshan temple (Wolong shan Qianfo yan shiku, 卧龙山千佛岩石窟)

== Aftermath of the 2008 Earthquake ==
Zitong, like neighbouring counties, was located near the epicentre of the 2008 Sichuan earthquake. Infrastructures in Zitong was partly destroyed, and drinking water was not available.

Also the Qiqushan Temple, who is since 1996 on the official list of Chinese national historical sites was partly destroyed by the earthquake.

== Climate ==
Climate data for Zitong, elevation 517 m (1,696 ft), (1991–2020 normals, extremes 1991–present)
Month	Jan	Feb	Mar	Apr	May	Jun	Jul	Aug	Sep	Oct	Nov	Dec	Year
Record high °C (°F)	20.3 (68.5)	23.1 (73.6)	32.0 (89.6)	34.5 (94.1)	36.7 (98.1)	38.1 (100.6)	39.2 (102.6)	41.2 (106.2)	36.7 (98.1)	31.5 (88.7)	26.4 (79.5)	20.3 (68.5)	41.2 (106.2)
Mean daily maximum °C (°F)	9.8 (49.6)	12.6 (54.7)	17.5 (63.5)	23.4 (74.1)	27.4 (81.3)	29.6 (85.3)	31.3 (88.3)	31.1 (88.0)	26.2 (79.2)	21.2 (70.2)	16.4 (61.5)	11.0 (51.8)	21.5 (70.6)
Daily mean °C (°F)	5.6 (42.1)	8.2 (46.8)	12.5 (54.5)	17.7 (63.9)	21.7 (71.1)	24.5 (76.1)	26.3 (79.3)	25.9 (78.6)	21.8 (71.2)	17.1 (62.8)	12.2 (54.0)	6.9 (44.4)	16.7 (62.1)
Mean daily minimum °C (°F)	2.4 (36.3)	5.0 (41.0)	8.7 (47.7)	13.2 (55.8)	17.3 (63.1)	20.7 (69.3)	22.7 (72.9)	22.3 (72.1)	18.8 (65.8)	14.4 (57.9)	9.2 (48.6)	4.0 (39.2)	13.2 (55.8)
Record low °C (°F)	−6.8 (19.8)	−3.1 (26.4)	−0.3 (31.5)	3.1 (37.6)	8.8 (47.8)	12.6 (54.7)	18.0 (64.4)	16.0 (60.8)	10.7 (51.3)	4.5 (40.1)	−0.4 (31.3)	−6.0 (21.2)	−6.8 (19.8)
Average precipitation mm (inches)	6.6 (0.26)	8.9 (0.35)	19.2 (0.76)	41.1 (1.62)	81.1 (3.19)	118.1 (4.65)	224.1 (8.82)	151.3 (5.96)	131.6 (5.18)	44.1 (1.74)	12.8 (0.50)	4.8 (0.19)	843.7 (33.22)
Average precipitation days (≥ 0.1 mm)	5.6	5.5	8.1	10.2	12.2	13.4	14.5	12.7	13.6	12.2	6.1	4.2	118.3
Average snowy days	1.6	0.6	0.1	0	0	0	0	0	0	0	0	0.5	2.8
Average relative humidity (%)	73	71	68	68	66	74	79	79	80	79	77	74	74
Mean monthly sunshine hours	62.8	61.0	93.7	123.0	131.3	119.2	134.6	146.0	81.1	68.6	67.6	62.2	1,151.1
Percentage possible sunshine	20	19	25	31	31	28	31	36	22	20	22	20	25
Source: China Meteorological Administration all-time extreme temperature all-time January high
