= Tongjiang County =

Tongjiang County 通江县 Tungkiang
- County
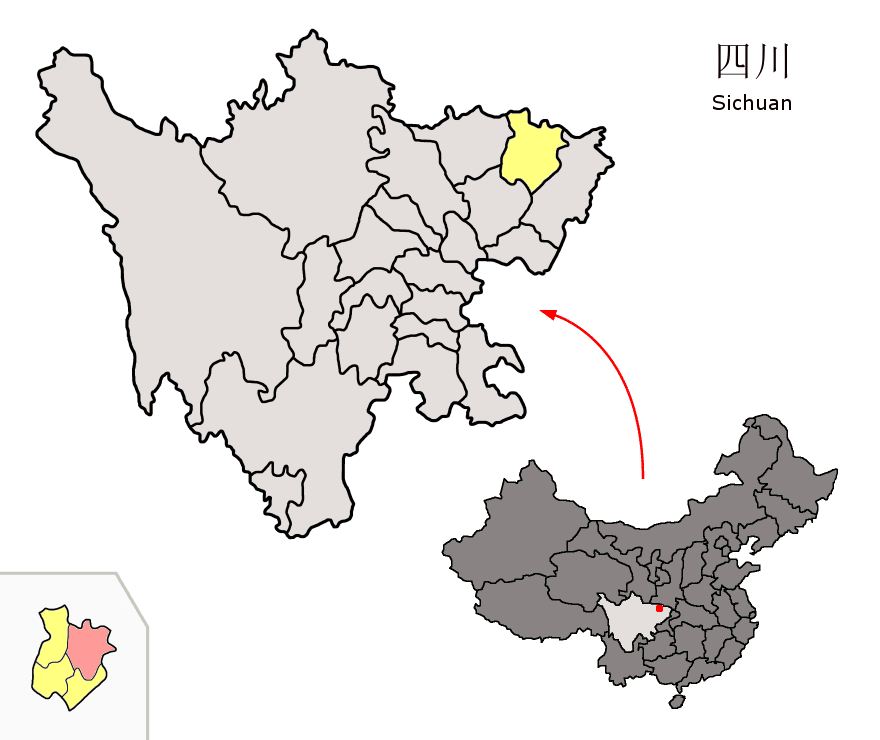
- Location of Tongjiang County (pink) and Bazhong City (yellow) within Sichuan
- Coordinates: 31°54′40″N 107°14′38″E
- Country: China
- Province: Sichuan
- Prefecture-level city: Bazhong
- County seat: Nuojiang

Area
  - Total: 4,119.78 km^{2} (1,590.66 sq mi)

Population (2020 census)
  - Total: 521,875
  - Density: 126.675/km^{2} (328.088/sq mi)
- Time zone: UTC+8 (China Standard)
- Website: www.tjxzf.gov.cn

Tongjiang County (Chinese: 通江县; pinyin: Tōngjiāng Xiàn) is a county in the northeast of Sichuan Province, China, bordering Shaanxi Province to the north. It is under the administration of the prefecture-level city of Bazhong, with an area of 4,125 km^{2} (1,593 sq mi), and a population of approximately 522,000 in 2020.

== Administrative divisions ==
Tongjiang County comprises 1 subdistrict, 30 towns and 2 townships:

subdistrict

- Bizhou 壁州街道

towns

- Nuojiang 诺江镇
- Minsheng 民胜镇
- Huoju 火炬镇
- Guangna广纳镇
- Tiefo 铁佛镇
- Mashi 麻石镇
- Zhicheng 至诚镇
- Hongkou 洪口镇
- Shaxi 沙溪镇
- Washi 瓦室镇
- Yong'an 永安镇
- Tiexi 铁溪镇
- Fuyang 涪阳镇
- Nuoshuihe 诺水河镇
- Maoyu 毛浴镇
- Nixi 泥溪镇
- Lianghekou 两河口镇
- Banqiaokou 板桥口镇
- Xinchang 新场镇
- Yangbai 杨柏镇
- Sanxi 三溪镇
- Chunzai 春在镇
- Longfengchang 龙凤场镇
- Kongshan 空山镇
- Changge 唱歌镇
- Chenhe 陈河镇
- Qingyu 青峪镇
- Xinglong 兴隆镇
- Yanxi 烟溪镇
- Changping 长坪镇

townships

- Songxi 松溪乡
- Shengli 胜利乡

== Geography ==
Tongjiang is located south of the eastern section of the Micang Mountain ranges. The area has features geographical features known as Karst topography.

Tongjiang has resources of natural gas, marble, dolomite, gypsum and uranium.

== Transportation ==
Provincial Highways 201 and 302 are main roads through Tongjiang County.

== History and Tourism ==
The Sichuan-Shaanxi border area of Tongjiang was the headquarters location for the formation of the Fourth Red Army, which became part of the People's Liberation Army. A cliff with a carved slogan "赤化全川", which translates roughly to "Communization All of Sichuan" or "Redden All of Sichuan", is a well-known landmark in the area.

Tongjiang is also known for its local specialty of cooked Fungus, and is known colloquially as the “中国银耳之乡” or "Hometown of Chinese White Fungus", and is listed for national protection as the originating region of this product; much like Champagne is in France.

== Climate ==
Climate data for Tongjiang, elevation 482 m (1,581 ft), (1991–2020 normals, extremes 1981–present)
Month	Jan	Feb	Mar	Apr	May	Jun	Jul	Aug	Sep	Oct	Nov	Dec	Year
Record high °C (°F)	20.2 (68.4)	23.9 (75.0)	32.4 (90.3)	34.6 (94.3)	37.7 (99.9)	37.8 (100.0)	38.9 (102.0)	40.2 (104.4)	38.9 (102.0)	33.6 (92.5)	27.1 (80.8)	19.5 (67.1)	40.2 (104.4)
Mean daily maximum °C (°F)	9.8 (49.6)	12.7 (54.9)	17.8 (64.0)	23.4 (74.1)	27.0 (80.6)	29.7 (85.5)	32.4 (90.3)	32.6 (90.7)	27.1 (80.8)	21.7 (71.1)	16.5 (61.7)	10.8 (51.4)	21.8 (71.2)
Daily mean °C (°F)	5.6 (42.1)	8.1 (46.6)	12.2 (54.0)	17.3 (63.1)	21.1 (70.0)	24.3 (75.7)	26.9 (80.4)	26.6 (79.9)	22.2 (72.0)	17.1 (62.8)	12 (54)	6.9 (44.4)	16.7 (62.1)
Mean daily minimum °C (°F)	2.8 (37.0)	4.9 (40.8)	8.3 (46.9)	13.0 (55.4)	16.9 (62.4)	20.6 (69.1)	23.1 (73.6)	22.7 (72.9)	19.1 (66.4)	14.4 (57.9)	9.3 (48.7)	4.4 (39.9)	13.3 (55.9)
Record low °C (°F)	−3.8 (25.2)	−2.0 (28.4)	−1.8 (28.8)	3.8 (38.8)	8.7 (47.7)	14.5 (58.1)	16.0 (60.8)	16.1 (61.0)	12.1 (53.8)	0.9 (33.6)	0.3 (32.5)	−4.7 (23.5)	−4.7 (23.5)
Average precipitation mm (inches)	6.6 (0.26)	16.1 (0.63)	31.5 (1.24)	67.1 (2.64)	133.3 (5.25)	176.4 (6.94)	255.5 (10.06)	159.0 (6.26)	163.6 (6.44)	101.7 (4.00)	40.8 (1.61)	9.7 (0.38)	1,161.3 (45.71)
Average precipitation days (≥ 0.1 mm)	5.9	6.7	9.5	11.6	13.2	13.3	13.9	11.1	13.4	13.4	9.2	6.9	128.1
Average snowy days	1.5	0.6	0.1	0	0	0	0	0	0	0	0.1	0.5	2.8
Average relative humidity (%)	76	73	71	73	74	79	80	77	81	83	82	80	77
Mean monthly sunshine hours	55.1	58.1	100.1	136.4	149.5	145.5	185.9	203.6	116.9	89.2	74.5	53.3	1,368.1
Percentage possible sunshine	17	18	27	35	35	34	43	50	32	26	24	17	30
Source: China Meteorological Administration
