= Guang'an =

Guang'an 广安市 Kwangan
- Prefecture-level city
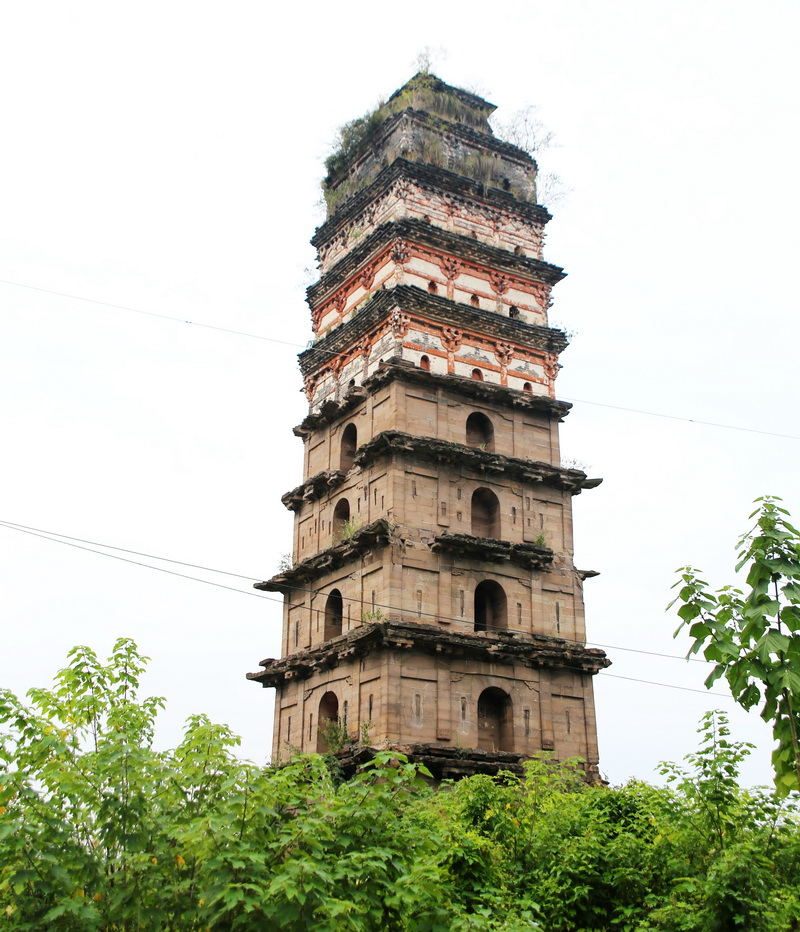
- White Pagoda in Guang'an

- Location of Guang'an in Sichuan

- Location within Sichuan
- Coordinates (Guang'an municipal government): 30°27′23″N 106°37′57″E
- Country: People's Republic of China
- Province: Sichuan
- Municipal seat: Guang'an District

Government

Area
  - Prefecture-level city: 6,339 km^{2} (2,448 sq mi)
  - Urban: 1,533.65 km^{2} (592.15 sq mi)
  - Metro: 1,533.65 km^{2} (592.15 sq mi)

Population (2020 census)
  - Prefecture-level city: 3,254,883
  - Density: 513.5/km^{2} (1,330/sq mi)
  - Urban: 976,370
  - Urban density: 636.63/km^{2} (1,648.9/sq mi)
  - Metro: 976,370
  - Metro density: 636.63/km^{2} (1,648.9/sq mi)

GDP
  - Prefecture-level city: CN¥ 100.6 billion US$ 16.1 billion
  - Per capita: CN¥ 31,046; US$ 4,985
- Time zone: UTC+8 (China Standard)
- ISO 3166 code: CN-SC-16
- Website: www.guang-an.gov.cn

Guang'an (Note: Chinese: 广安; pinyin: Guǎng'ān; Wade–Giles: kwang-an) is a prefecture-level city in eastern Sichuan province. It is most famous as the birthplace of China's former paramount leader Deng Xiaoping. Guang'an lies between the hills of central Sichuan and the gorges area of the east. Guang'an is the only "Sichuan Chongqing Cooperation Demonstration Zone" in Sichuan and the nearest prefecture level city from the main city of Chongqing. It has been incorporated into the one-hour economic circle of Chongqing. Because of its strategic location, it is called the "Gateway to Eastern Sichuan". Its population, as of the 2020 census, was 3,254,883, of whom 976,370 lived in the built-up (or metro) area made up of two urban districts.

== Geography and climate ==
Guang'an is located on a gradually rising section along the edge of the Sichuan Basin. The area is 6,344 km^{2} (2,449 sq mi). The eastern part of Guang'an is mountainous, the central part hilly, and the western part is relatively flat. The elevation ranges from only 185 to 1704 meters above sea-level. The main rivers are the Qu through the center of the area and the Jialing through the west.

The climate is temperate and the weather is monsoonal. The average annual temperature ranges from 16°C to 18°C, with January being the coldest month (average temperature: 6°C) and July being the warmest (average temperature: 28°C). The humidity levels are relatively high throughout the year, with an average relative humidity of around 75%. Winters are mild and summers are hot. The average rainfall is between 1,000–1,500 mm (39–59 in). The frost-free period lasts 310–324 days. Winter and spring have relatively little rain while in summer there are heavy rain showers. Autumns have almost constant rain and light wind.

Climate data for Guang'an, elevation 395 m (1,296 ft), (1991–2020 normals, extremes 1981–present)
| Month | Jan | Feb | Mar | Apr | May | Jun | Jul | Aug | Sep | Oct | Nov | Dec | Year |
|---|---|---|---|---|---|---|---|---|---|---|---|---|---|
| Record high °C (°F) | 17.1 (62.8) | 22.4 (72.3) | 32.7 (90.9) | 35.7 (96.3) | 37.1 (98.8) | 36.8 (98.2) | 40.7 (105.3) | 43.1 (109.6) | 41.9 (107.4) | 34.3 (93.7) | 25.4 (77.7) | 17.7 (63.9) | 43.1 (109.6) |
| Mean daily maximum °C (°F) | 9.4 (48.9) | 12.4 (54.3) | 17.5 (63.5) | 23.0 (73.4) | 26.4 (79.5) | 28.8 (83.8) | 32.5 (90.5) | 32.8 (91.0) | 27.4 (81.3) | 21.2 (70.2) | 16.2 (61.2) | 10.4 (50.7) | 21.5 (70.7) |
| Daily mean °C (°F) | 6.6 (43.9) | 9.0 (48.2) | 13.1 (55.6) | 18.2 (64.8) | 21.7 (71.1) | 24.5 (76.1) | 27.7 (81.9) | 27.6 (81.7) | 23.1 (73.6) | 17.8 (64.0) | 13.1 (55.6) | 7.9 (46.2) | 17.5 (63.6) |
| Mean daily minimum °C (°F) | 4.5 (40.1) | 6.5 (43.7) | 10.1 (50.2) | 14.6 (58.3) | 18.2 (64.8) | 21.4 (70.5) | 24.1 (75.4) | 23.8 (74.8) | 20.2 (68.4) | 15.6 (60.1) | 11.0 (51.8) | 6.1 (43.0) | 14.7 (58.4) |
| Record low °C (°F) | −2.7 (27.1) | −0.1 (31.8) | −0.4 (31.3) | 4.8 (40.6) | 9.3 (48.7) | 14.2 (57.6) | 17.8 (64.0) | 17.5 (63.5) | 12.8 (55.0) | 3.2 (37.8) | 2.5 (36.5) | −2.7 (27.1) | −2.7 (27.1) |
| Average precipitation mm (inches) | 16.3 (0.64) | 19.9 (0.78) | 44.6 (1.76) | 87.0 (3.43) | 152.8 (6.02) | 180.4 (7.10) | 174.7 (6.88) | 128.2 (5.05) | 126.1 (4.96) | 99.9 (3.93) | 45.2 (1.78) | 18.6 (0.73) | 1,093.7 (43.06) |
| Average precipitation days (≥ 0.1 mm) | 9.6 | 8.7 | 10.6 | 12.9 | 15.0 | 15.8 | 12.3 | 11.3 | 13.1 | 15.6 | 10.7 | 9.5 | 145.1 |
| Average snowy days | 0.6 | 0.3 | 0 | 0 | 0 | 0 | 0 | 0 | 0 | 0 | 0 | 0.1 | 1 |
| Average relative humidity (%) | 85 | 81 | 77 | 77 | 78 | 82 | 78 | 75 | 82 | 87 | 87 | 87 | 81 |
| Mean monthly sunshine hours | 40.3 | 47.1 | 93.5 | 129.4 | 132.0 | 125.1 | 190.4 | 193.4 | 115.6 | 67.8 | 55.8 | 34.1 | 1,224.5 |
| Percentage possible sunshine | 12 | 15 | 25 | 33 | 31 | 30 | 45 | 48 | 32 | 19 | 18 | 11 | 27 |
Source: China Meteorological Administration all-time extreme temperatureall-time July high

== Administration ==
Guang'an city has 1 (sub)city, 3 counties, 87 towns, and 2886 villages within it, and a total population of 3,205,476 in the 2010 census. None of the districts are urban in character as of 2010. Nevertheless, large-scale dense urban building projects and even urban rapid transit were nearing completion as of 2019, remaking the urbanscape entirely, and making the 2010 census data out-dated.At the end of 2024, the resident population is 3.227 million, including 1.529 million urban residents and 1.698 million rural residents. The urbanization rate of the resident population is 47.38%, an increase of 0.81 percentage points over the previous year.

Map
| Name | Hanzi | Hanyu Pinyin | Population (2010) | Area (km^{2}) | Density (/km^{2}) |
|---|---|---|---|---|---|
| Guang'an District | 广安区 | Guǎng'ān Qū | 858,159 | 1,032 | 832 |
| Qianfeng District | 前锋区 | Qiánfēng Qū | 530,000 | 504 | 1051 |
| Huaying City | 华蓥市 | Huāyíng Shì | 368,000^{(2015)} | 505.6 | 728 |
| Yuechi County | 岳池县 | Yuèchí Xiàn | 778,639 | 1,457 | 534 |
| Wusheng County | 武胜县 | Wǔshèng Xiàn | 585,624 | 966 | 606 |
| Linshui County | 邻水县 | Línshuǐ Xiàn | 704,695 | 1,919 | 367 |

== Transport ==
The city lies on the north–south China National Highway 212.

A 9.955 km (6.186 mi), seven-station monorail is under construction as part of the planned two line Guang'an Metro. The first line was due to open in 2020 but testing has been delayed and as of June 2021, the line is still not open.

== Economy ==
Guang'an's economy is natural resource based. Mineral resources are plentiful and the soil is ideal for agriculture.

Guang'an is breaking down policy barriers with neighboring Chongqing through innovative reforms, driving economic development in a key western China city cluster vital to the nation's automobile industry, according to Wang Ying, a deputy to the 14th National People's Congress.

== Tourism ==
Chinese leader Deng Xiaoping's birthplace and former residence museum is located in Paifang village (牌坊村) in Xiexing town (协兴镇). Guang'an also has a scenic view, including many mountains and gorges designated as parks.
