= Huaying =

Huaying 华蓥市
- County-level city
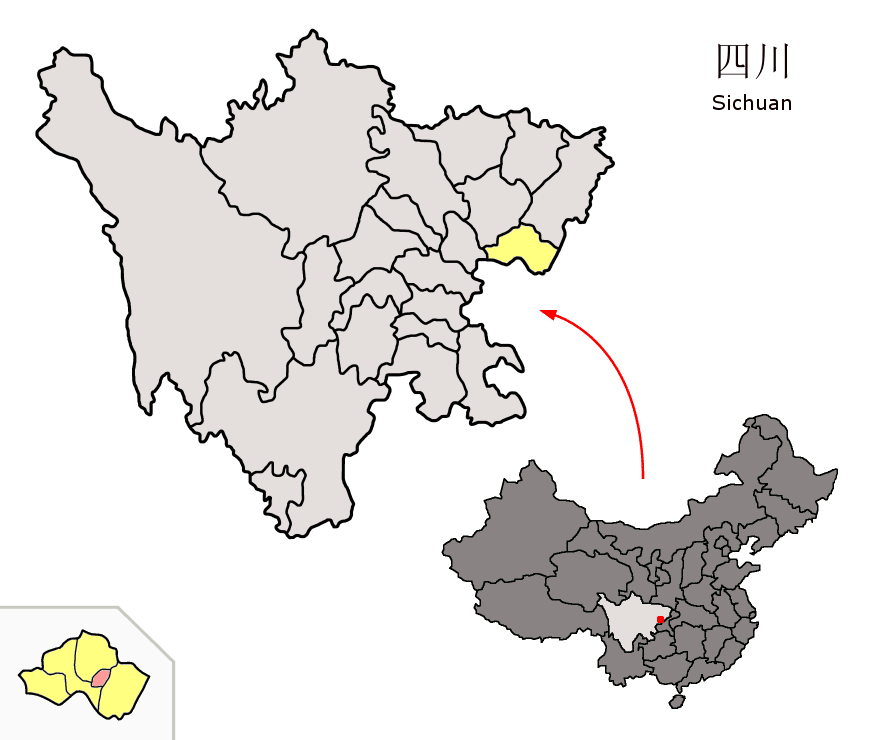
- Location of Huaying City (red) in Guang'an City (yellow) and Sichuan

- Location of the city centre in Sichuan
- Coordinates: 30°22′29″N 106°47′25″E
- Country: China
- Province: Sichuan
- Prefecture-level city: Guang'an

Area
  - Total: 470 km^{2} (180 sq mi)

Population (2016)
  - Total: 360,000
  - Density: 770/km^{2} (2,000/sq mi)
- Time zone: UTC+8 (China Standard Time)

Huaying (simplified Chinese: 华蓥市; traditional Chinese: 華鎣市; pinyin: Huáyíng Shì) is a county-level city in the east of Sichuan province, China. It is administered by the prefecture-level city Guang'an. Its total population as of 2016 is 360,000 and with 50000 in the central city district. The city tree is the small leafed banyan and the city flower is the azalea.

== Administrative divisions ==
Huaying comprises 3 subdistricts, 8 towns and 1 township:

subdistricts

- Shuanghe 双河街道
- Guqiao 古桥街道
- Hualong 华龙街道

towns

- Tianchi 天池镇
- Lushi 禄市镇
- Yongxing 永兴镇
- Mingyue 明月镇
- Yanghe 阳和镇
- Gaoxing 高兴镇
- Xikou 溪口镇
- Qinghua 庆华镇

township

- Hongyan 红岩乡
