= Shu Wang =

Shu Wang (蜀王, King/Prince of Shu) may refer to:

- Qiao Zong (died 413), warlord who founded the Western Shu dynasty, given the title Prince of Shu by the Later Qin emperor
- Yang Xiu (Sui dynasty) (573–618), Sui dynasty prince, known as Prince of Shu from 581 to 602
- Li Ke (died 653), Tang dynasty prince, known as Prince of Shu from 627 to 636
- Li Gui (prince) (750–783), Tang dynasty prince
- Wang Jian (Former Shu) (847–918), warlord who founded the Former Shu dynasty, known as Prince of Shu from 903 to 907 during the Tang dynasty
- Meng Zhixiang (874–934), warlord who founded the Later Shu dynasty, known as Prince of Shu from 933 to 934 during the Later Tang dynasty

== See also ==
- Wang Shu (born 1963), Chinese architect
- An Dương Vương (fl. 3rd or 2nd century BC), king of Âu Lạc, supposedly a prince from the ancient Chinese state of Shu
- Shu (disambiguation)
- Wang (disambiguation)
- Wangshu (disambiguation)
