= Wangshu =

Wangshu or Wang-Shu or variation, may refer to:

== Places ==
- Former Shu (907-925 Chinese: 王蜀; pinyin: Wang-Shu; lit. 'Shu King(dom)'), a former country of the 10 Kingdoms, during the Five Dynasties and Ten Kingdoms period of Chinese history
- Wangshu (extinguished 563 BC; Chinese: 王叔 (王叔国); ㄨㄤˊ ㄕㄨ) a former country in Chinese history during the Spring and Autumn period
- Wangshu, Hebei (Chinese: 望树镇), Yanshan, Hebei, China; a town; see List of township-level divisions of Hebei
- HD 173416 b (planet), Star Xihe, Constellation Lyra; an exoplanet named after the Chinese goddess 望舒 who drives the moon

== People ==
- Wang Shu (born 1963; Chinese: 王澍; Shu Wang), Chinese architect
- Wang Shu (3rd century BC; Chinese: 王述; Shu Wang), grandson of Wang Chang (Three Kingdoms)
- Duke Wen of Wangshu (died 624 BC; Chinese: 王叔文公), son of King Xi of Zhou
- Wang Shu (Eastern Jin) (Chinese: 王舒), cousin of Wang Dun and Wang Dao
- Dai Wangshu (1905–1950; Chinese: 戴望舒; pinyin: Dài Wàngshū; Wade–Giles: Tai Wang-shu), Chinese poet
- Wangnam Wangshu, an Indian politician

== Other uses ==
- Wangshu (Chinese: 望舒; a.k.a. Xian'e meaning beauty), Chinese goddess who drives the Moon across the sky in Chinese mythology
- Wanshū (Japanese: ワンシュー) a.k.a. Wangshu; a kata in Japanese karate

== See also ==
- Shu (disambiguation)
- Wang (disambiguation)
- Shu Wang (disambiguation)
