= Shoo =

Shoo or Shōō may refer to:

== Arts, entertainment, and media ==
=== Literature ===
- Shoo!, a children's book by Michael Rosen

=== Music ===
- "Shoo", a song by Suicide Dolls from Prayers in Parking Lots
- "Shoo", a 2006 song by Mac Hall from Thizziana Stoned & Tha Temple of Shrooms
- "Shoo", a 1998 song by The Flip Squad from The Flip Squad All-Star DJs

== Companies and organizations ==
- Steve Madden (company), American footwear company (NASDAQ stock symbol SHOO)

== Geography ==
- Shōō, Okayama (勝央 Shouou), a Japanese town

== History ==
- Shōō (Kamakura period) (正応 Shouou), a Japanese era name (1288–1293)
- Shoo, an alternative name for Jōō (Edo period), a Japanese era name (1652–1655)

== People ==
- Shoo (singer), also known as Yoo Soo-Young, a member of K-Pop girl group S.E.S.

== See also ==
- Scram (disambiguation)
- "Shoo Be Doo" (The Cars song), a 1979 single by The Cars
- "Shoo Be Doo", a 2007 song by Macy Gray
- "Shoo Fly, Don't Bother Me", a popular song from 1869
- "Shoo-Shoo Baby" (song), a popular song made famous by The Andrews Sisters in 1943
- "Shoo-Be-Doo-Be-Doo-Da-Day", a 1968 single by Stevie Wonder
- Shu (disambiguation)
