= Sanxingdui =

Bronze Age culture in Sichuan, China

Coordinates: 30.993°N 104.200°E

Sanxingdui culture
- Geographical range: Chengdu Plain
- Period: Bronze Age China
- Dates: c. 1700 – c. 1150 BC
- Type site: Sanxingdui
- Major sites: Guanghan, Deyang
- Preceded by: Baodun culture
- Followed by: Jinsha; Ba and Shu

Chinese name
- Chinese: 三星堆文化
Transcriptions
Standard Mandarin
- Hanyu Pinyin: Sānxīngduī wénhuà

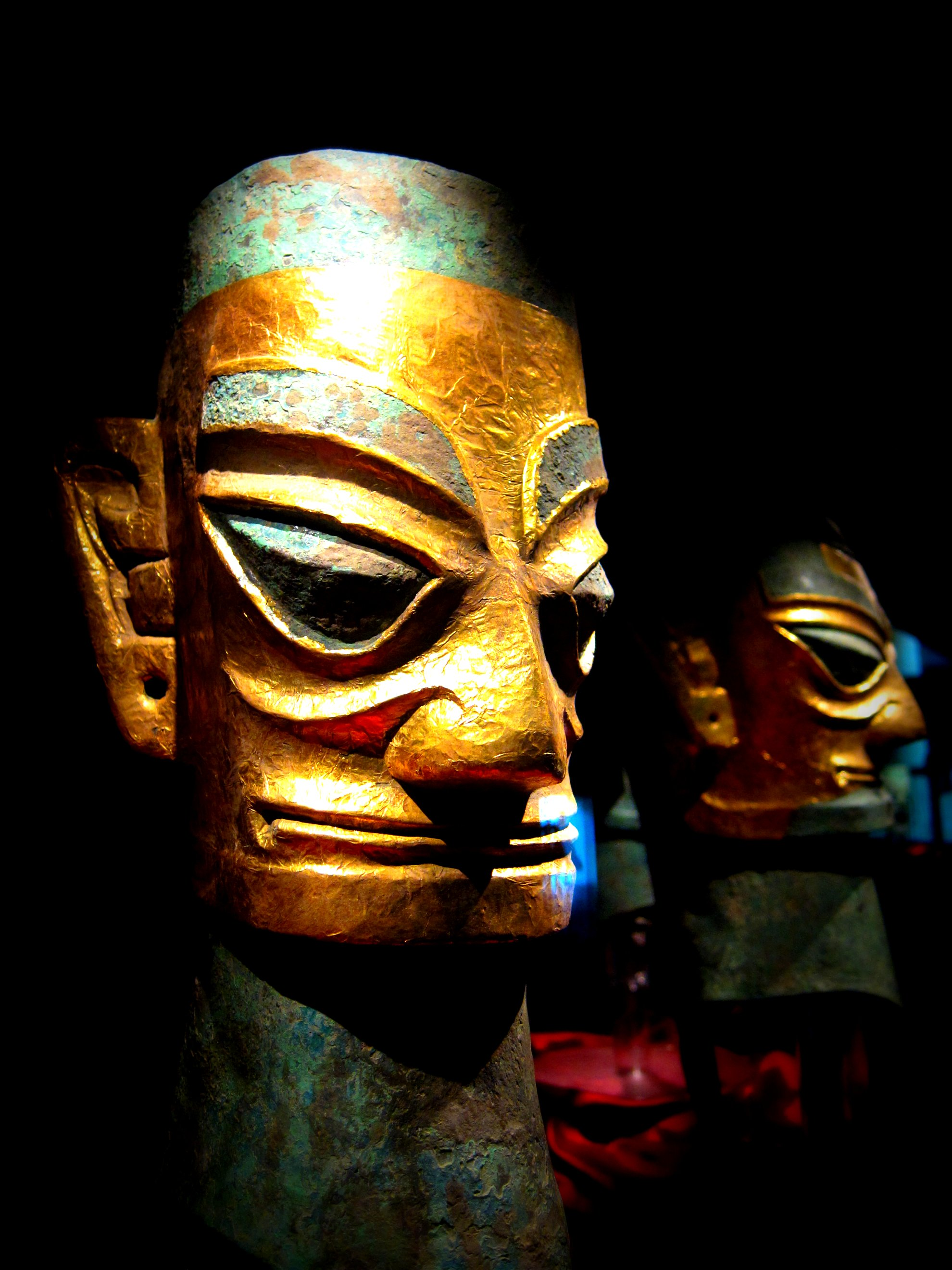
Sanxingdui bronze heads with gold foil masks

Sanxingdui (Chinese: 三星堆; pinyin: Sānxīngduī; lit. 'Three Star Mound') is an archaeological site and a major Bronze Age culture in modern Guanghan, Sichuan, China. Largely discovered in 1986, following a preliminary finding in 1927, archaeologists excavated artifacts that radiocarbon dating placed in the 12th–11th centuries BC.

The archaeological site is the type site for the Sanxingdui culture that produced these artifacts, archeologists have identified the locale with the ancient kingdom of Shu, which suggests the presence of a unique civilization in this region before the state of Qin conquered the area in 316 BC. The artifacts are displayed in the Sanxingdui Museum located near the city of Guanghan.

Sanxingdui is on the UNESCO list of tentative World Heritage Sites, along with the Jinsha site and the tombs of boat-shaped coffins.

== Background ==
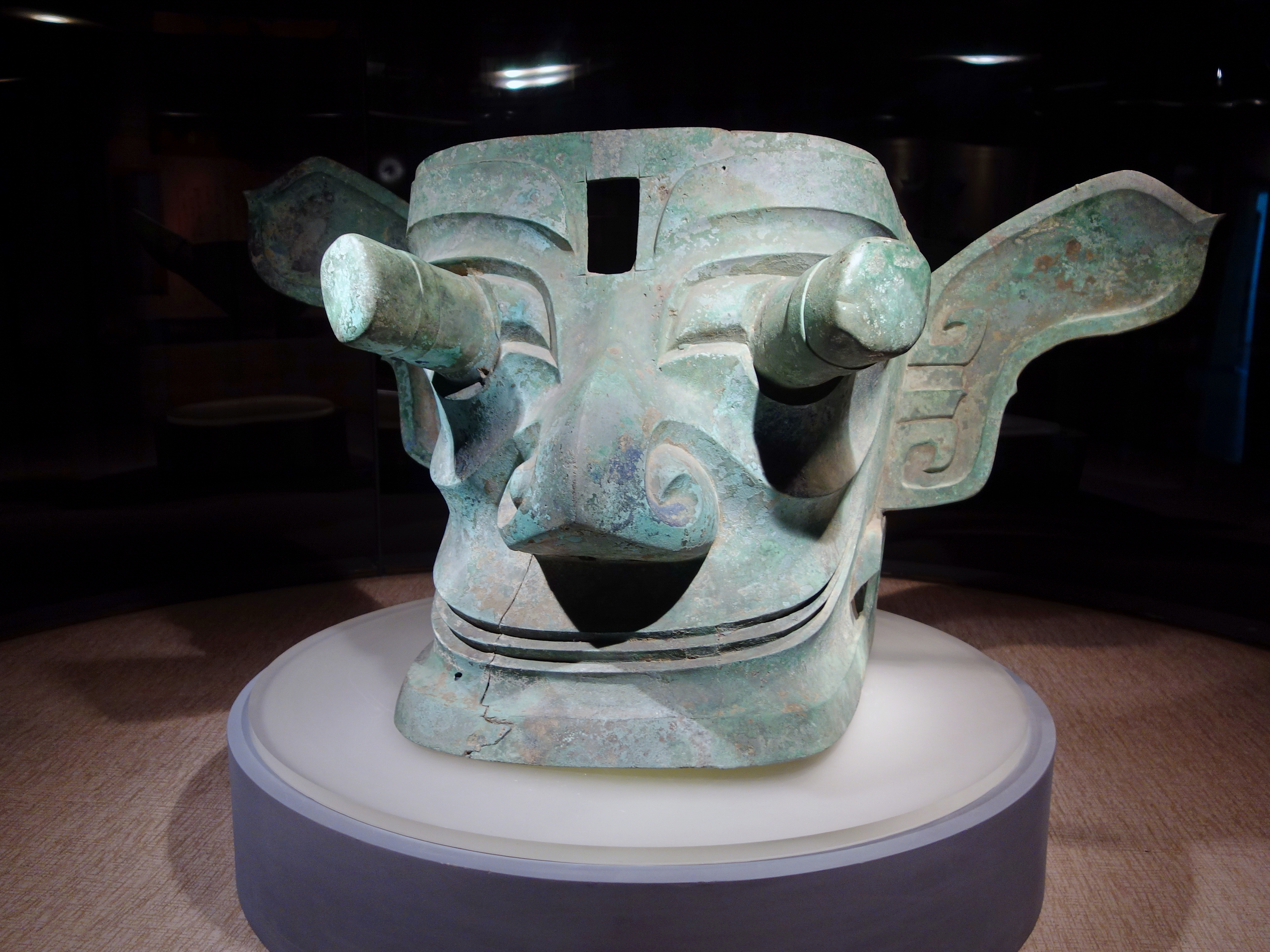
A large bronze head with protruding eyes that some believe to be a depiction of Cancong, the semi-legendary first king of Shu.

Many Chinese archaeologists have identified the Sanxingdui culture as part of the ancient kingdom of Shu, linking the artifacts found at the site to its early and legendary kings. The kingdom is mentioned in Shiji and Shujing as an ally of the Zhou who defeated the Shang. Accounts of the legendary kings of Shu also may be found in local annals.

According to the Chronicles of Huayang that were compiled during the Jin dynasty (266–420), the Shu kingdom was founded by Cancong (蠶叢). Cancong was described as having protruding eyes, a feature that is found in many of the masks and figures of Sanxingdui. It has therefore been suggested that the large masks with protruding eyes are a representation of Cancong, although there are other interpretations.

Other eye-shaped objects were also found that might suggest worship of the eyes. Other rulers mentioned in Chronicles of Huayang include Boguan (柏灌), Yufu (魚鳧), and Duyu (杜宇). Many of the objects are fish- and bird-shaped, and these have been suggested to be totems of Boguan and Yufu (the name Yufu means fish cormorant), and the clan of Yufu has been suggested as the one most likely to be associated with Sanxingdui.

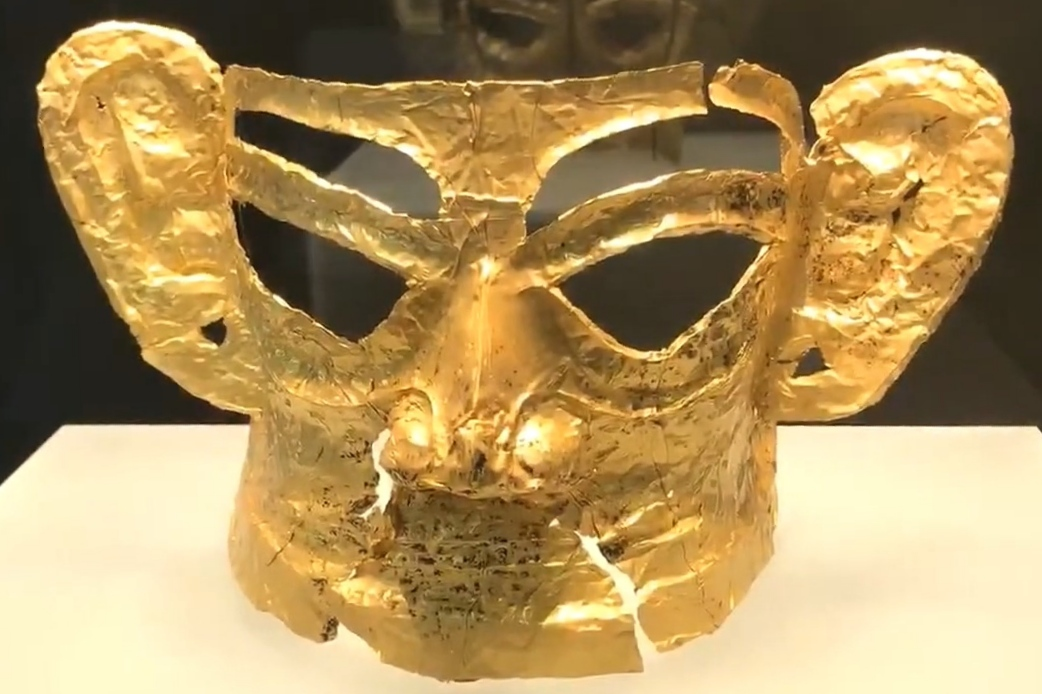
Sanxingdui Gold Mask excavated in 2021

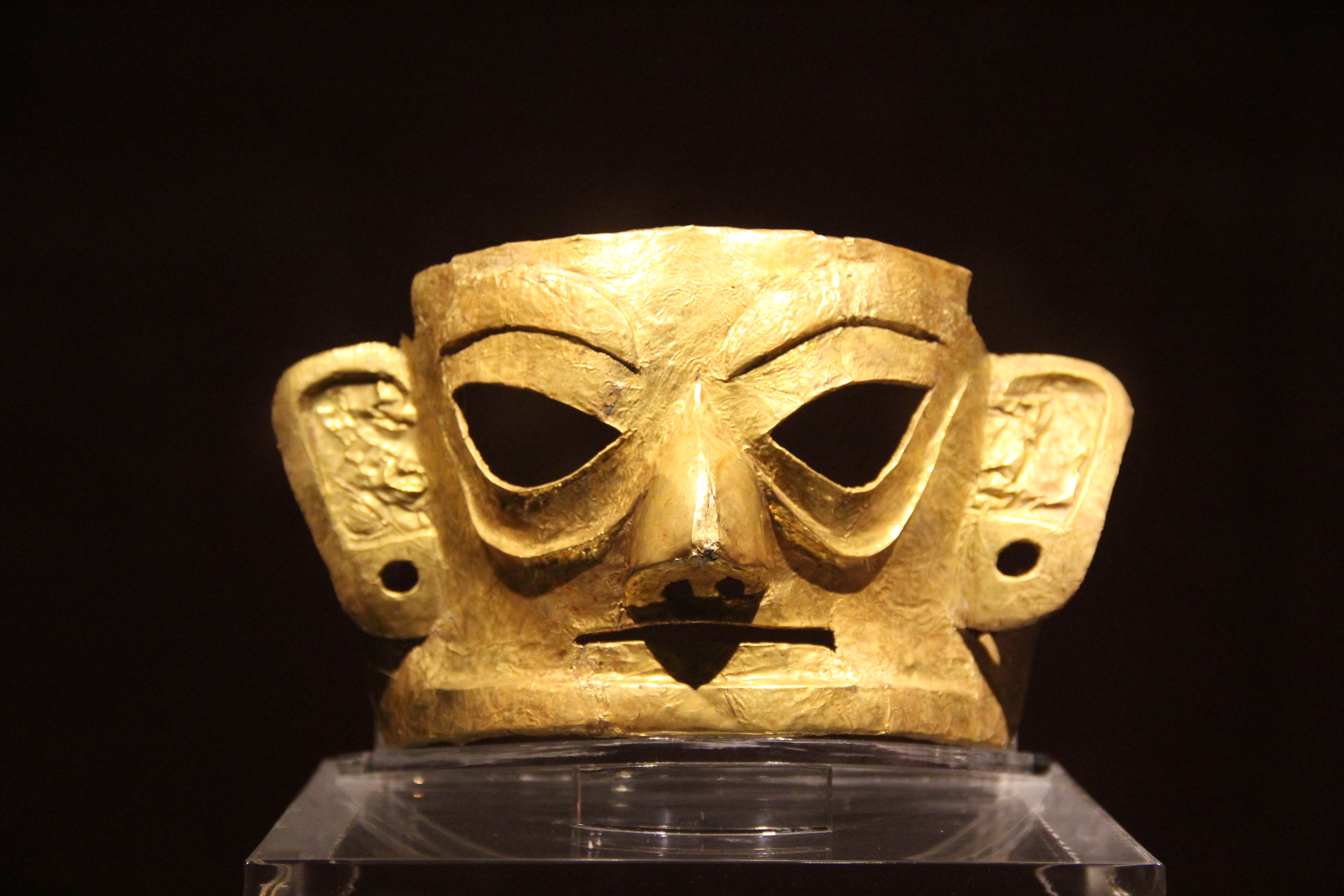
A Golden Mask in the Jinsha Site Museum, which is very similar to Sanxingdui masks in shape and style

Later, similar discoveries were made at Jinsha as well, which is located 40 km away and has links to the Sanxingdui culture. It is thought to be the relocated capital of the Shu Kingdom. It also has been suggested that the Jinsha site may be the hub and capital of the Duyu clan.

=== Archaeological site ===
The Sanxingdui site is divided into a sacrificial area, a palace, workshops, and a residential area

The Sanxingdui archaeological site is located about 4 kilometres (2.5 mi) northeast of Nanxing Township, Guanghan, Deyang, Sichuan Province. Archaeological digs at the site showed evidence of a walled city founded c. 1,600 BC. The trapezoidal city has an east wall 2,000 metres (6,600 ft), south wall 2,000 metres (6,600 ft), west wall 1,600 metres (5,200 ft) enclosing 3.6 square kilometres (1.4 sq mi), similar in scale to the inner city of the Zhengzhou Shang City.

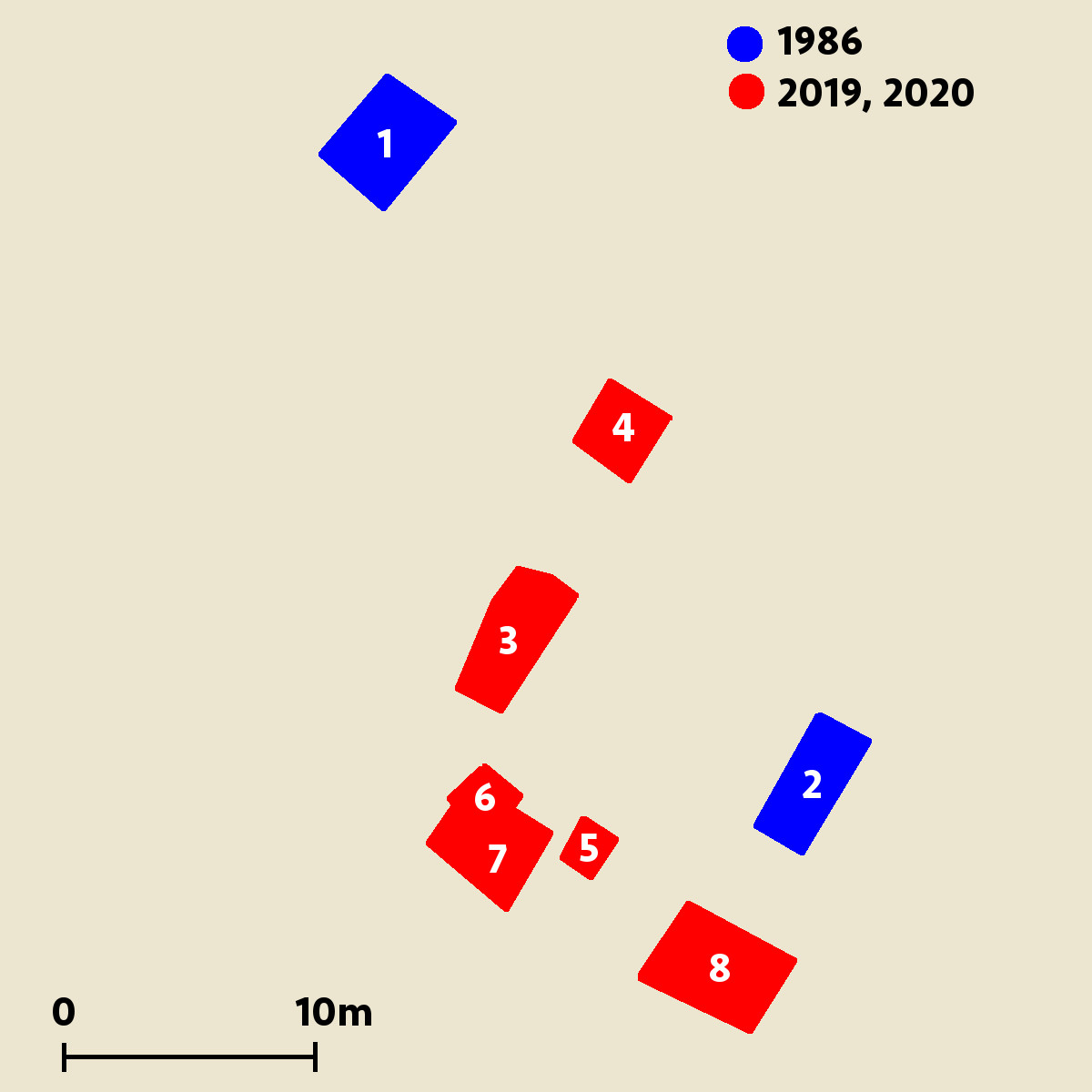
The layout of the 8 pits with artefacts

The city was built on the banks of the Yazi River (Chinese: 涧河; pinyin: Jiān Hé), and enclosed part of its tributary, Mamu River, within the city walls. The city walls were 40 metres (130 ft) at the base and 20 metres (66 ft) at the top, varying in height from 8–10 metres (26–33 ft). There was a smaller set of inner walls.

The walls were surrounded by canals 25–20 metres (82–66 ft) wide and 2–3 metres (6 ft 7 in – 9 ft 10 in) deep. These canals were used for irrigation, inland navigation, defense, and flood control. The city was divided into residential, industrial, and religious districts organized around a dominant central axis. It is along this axis that most of the pit burials have been found on four terraces. The structures were timber-framed adobe rectangular halls. The largest was a meeting hall about 200 m^{2} (2,200 sq ft).

=== Discovery ===
Evidence of an ancient culture in this region was first found in 1927 when a farmer unearthed a large stash of jade relics while dredging an irrigation ditch, many of which through the years found their way into the hands of private collectors. In 1931, the discovery was brought to the attention of Vyvyan Donnithorne, an Anglican missionary stationed at the Gospel Church of Guanghan. He recognised the importance of the discovery and contacted a local magistrate as well as Daniel Sheets Dye, a professor of geology at West China Union University (WCUU). The three of them then visited the location and photographed and measured the site. Through the magistrate, a few items were acquired and sent to the museum at WCUU. Then, in 1934, David Crockett Graham, the new director of the museum at WCUU, organised the first archaeological excavation of the site.

In 1986, local workers accidentally found sacrificial pits containing thousands of gold, bronze, jade, and pottery artifacts that had been broken (perhaps ritually disfigured), burned, and carefully buried. Containing approximately 800 objects, the second sacrificial pit was found a little less than a month later, on August 14, 1986, only 20–30 metres (66–98 ft) from the first one.

Bronze objects found in the second sacrificial pit included sculptures of humans, animal-faced sculptures, bells, decorative animals such as dragons, snakes, chicks, and birds, and axes. Tables, masks, and belts were some of the objects found that were made out of gold, while objects made out of jade included axes, tablets, rings, knives, and tubes. There were also many ivory carvings, and clam shells. Researchers were astonished to find an artistic style that was completely unknown in the history of Chinese art.

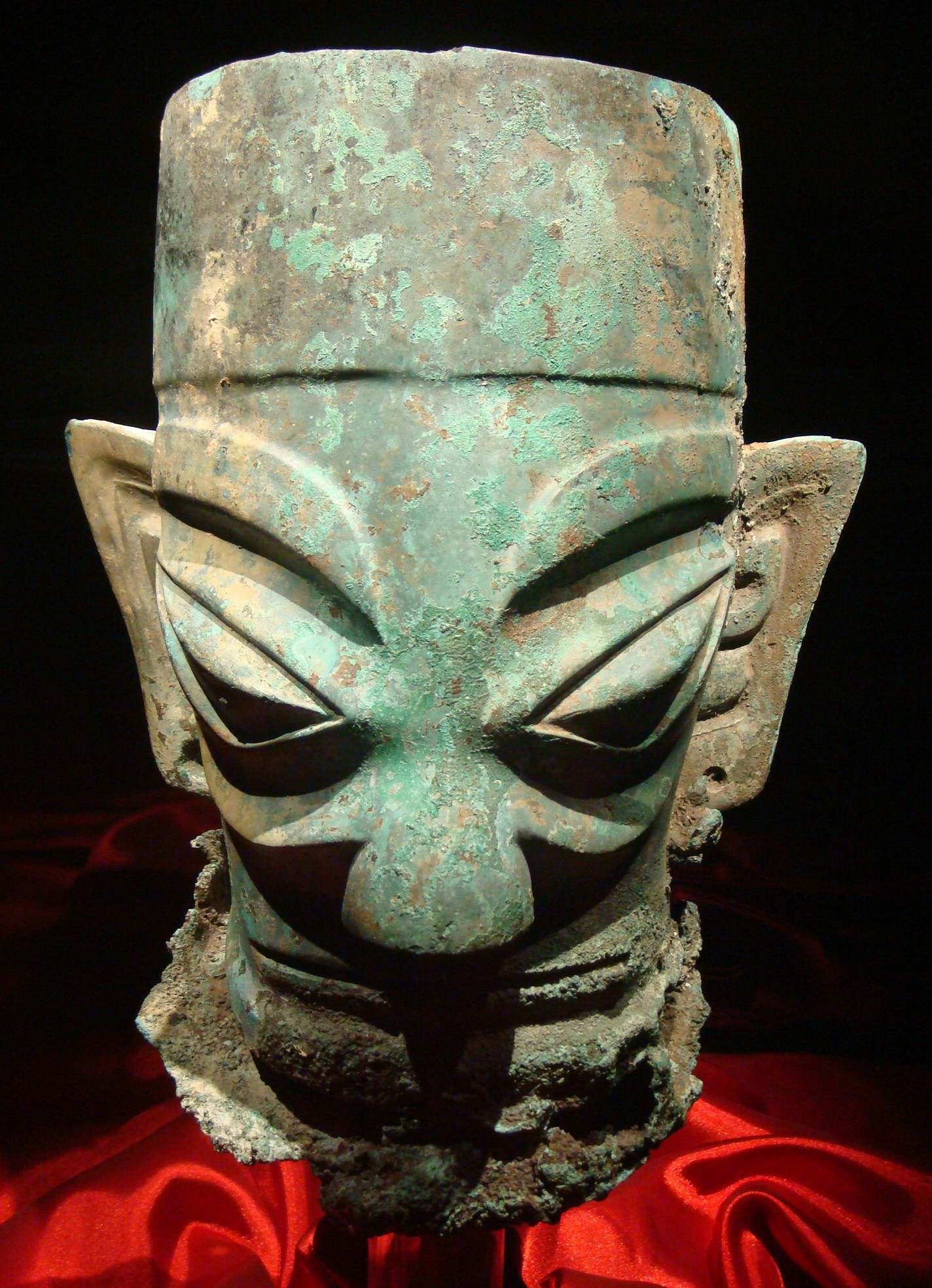
A bronze head (height 27 centimetres [11 in]) from the thirteenth or twelfth century BC that was excavated from Pit 1 in Sanxingdui

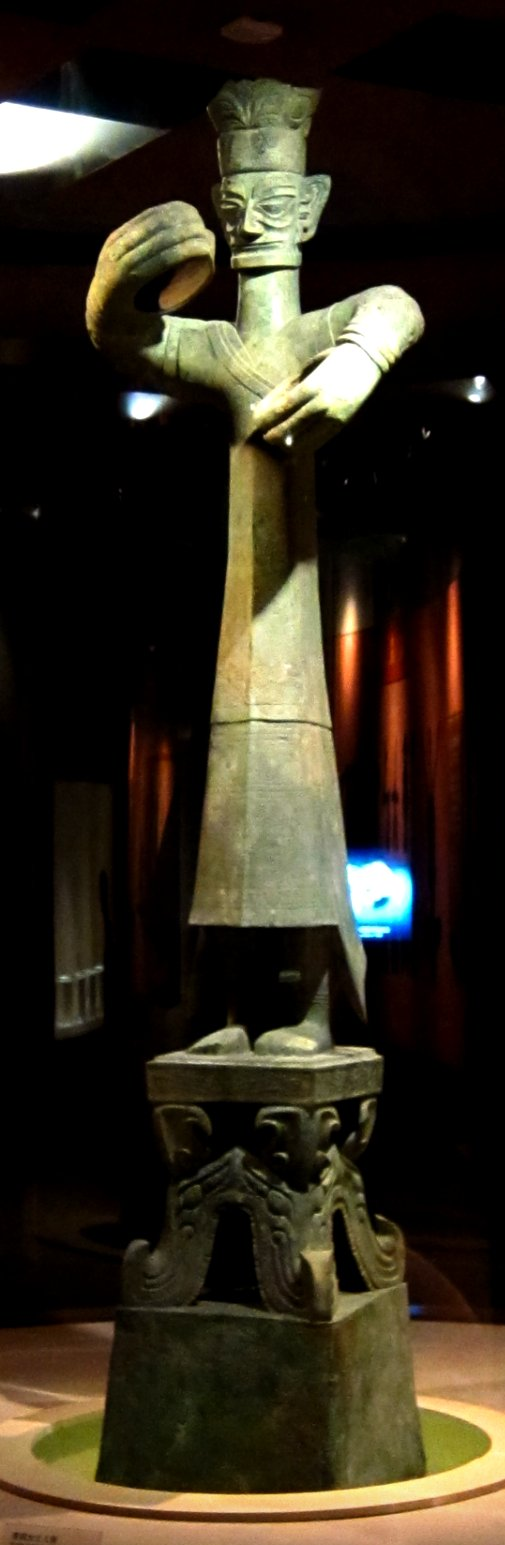
An upright bronze figure representing a religious official

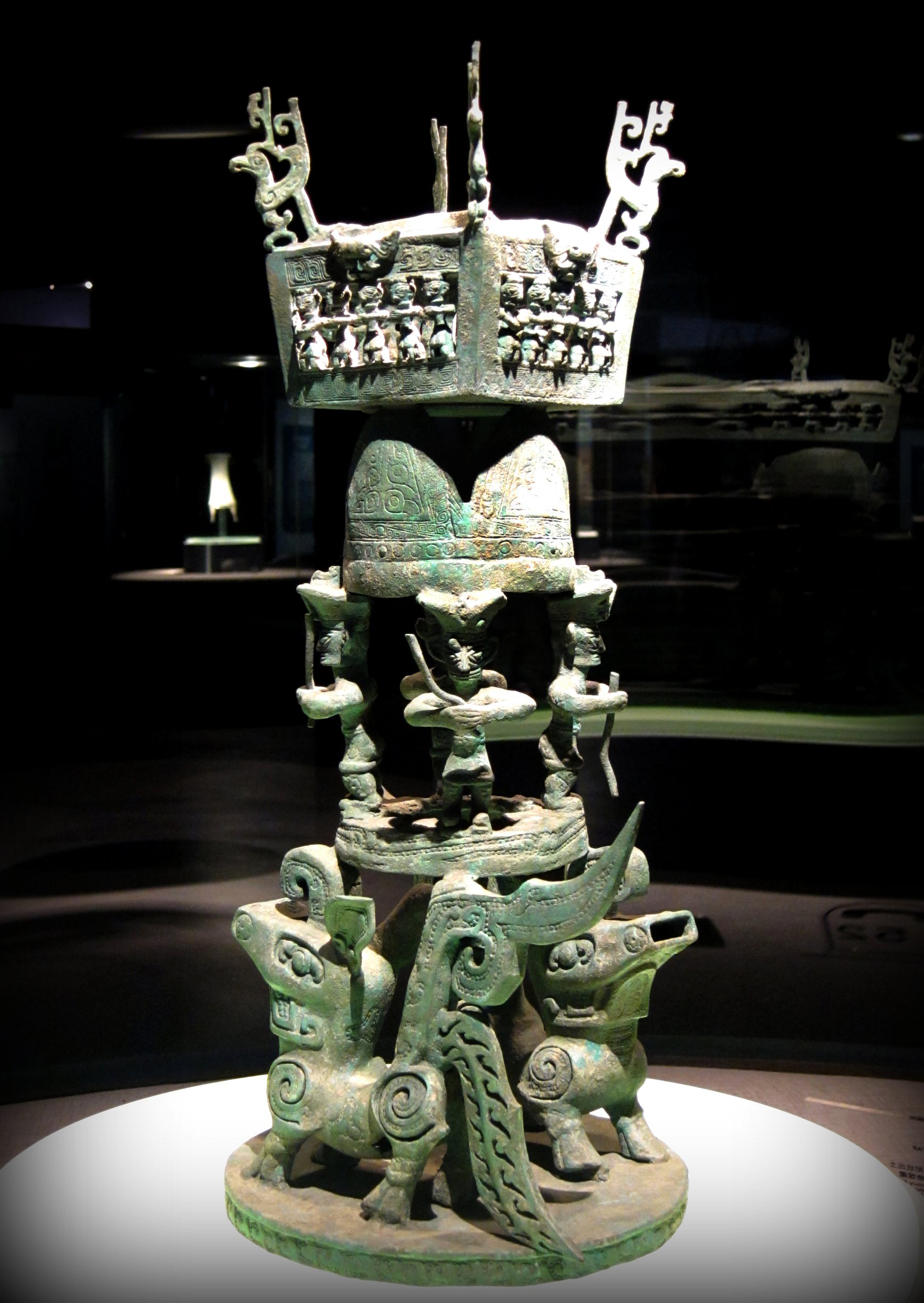
A sacrificial altar with several four-legged animals at the base to support a few bronze figures closely resembling the large face masks, each holding a ceremonial offering of some sort in outstretched hands.

Among the Sanxingdui discoveries, the bronze artifacts garnered exceptional scholarly attention. Task Rosen, chief archaeological expert from the British Museum, considered them to be more outstanding than the Terracotta Army in Xi'an. The first exhibits of Sanxingdui bronzes were held in Beijing (1987, 1990) and the Olympic Museum in Lausanne (1993).

Despite the interest in the excavated finds, the site suffered from flooding and pollution. For this reason the site was included in the 1996 World Monuments Watch by the World Monuments Fund. For the preservation of the site, funding was offered by American Express to construct a protective dike. In 1997, the Sanxingdui Museum was opened near the original site as a central repository and exhibition complex for all Sanxingdui artifacts.

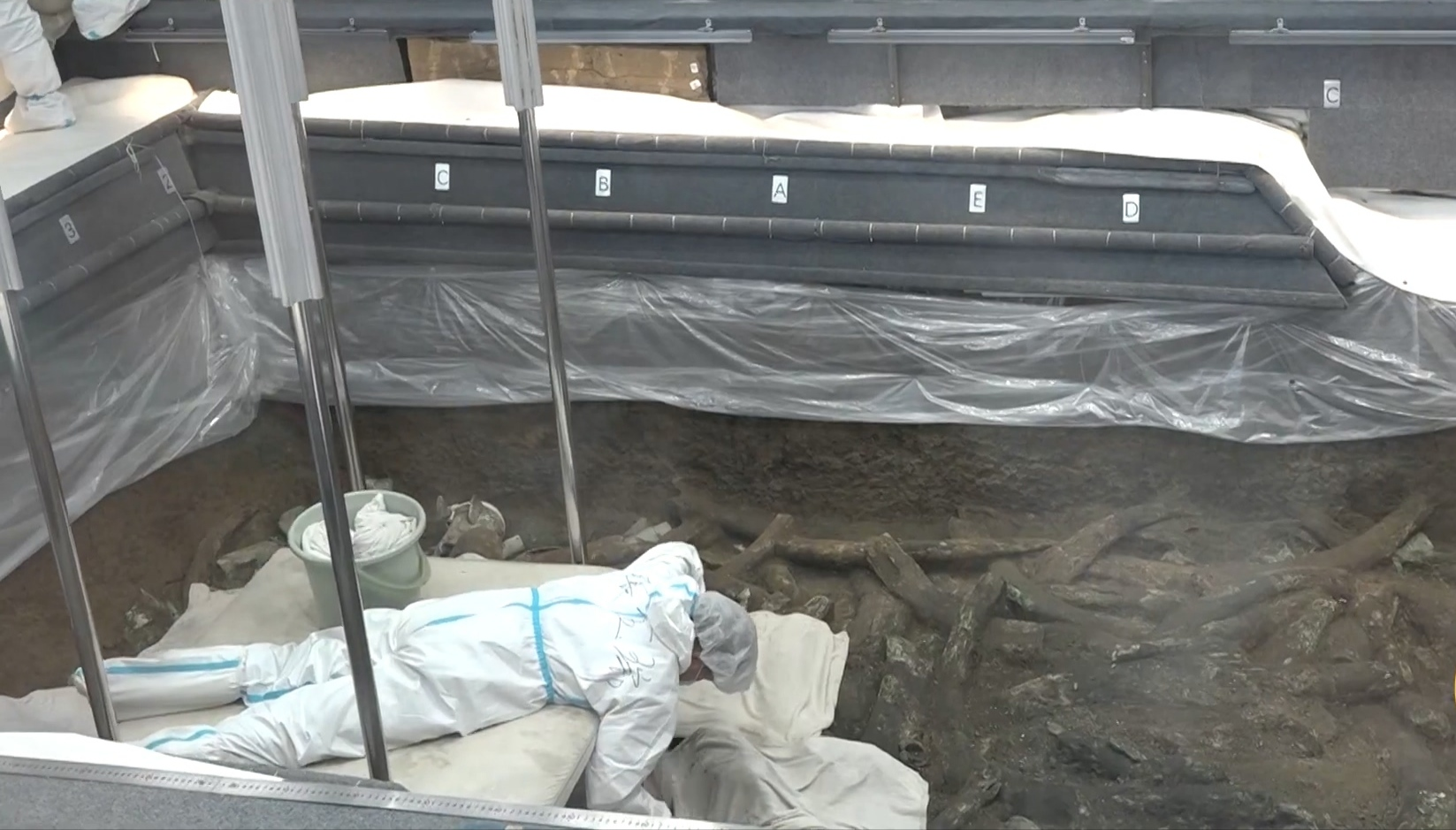
An archaeologist working in a pit

In March 2021, more than 500 cultural relics, including a 3,000-year-old gold mask, were discovered at Sanxingdui at a 4.6 square miles (12 km^{2}) area outside the provincial capital of Chengdu. The mask is estimated to be made from 84% gold and weighs 280 grams (9.9 oz). According to the National Cultural Heritage Administration, the items were recovered from six newly discovered "sacrificial pits". Additional masks, jade tools, and ivory relics were also discovered in the pit.

The six pits were discovered at the Sanxingdui site between 2020 and 2022 during a renewed slate of excavations. The artifacts found in these excavations include fragments of a gold mask, traces of silk, bronze ware depicting animals, ivory carvings, and more. A round of excavations is scheduled to conclude in October 2022.

== Culture ==
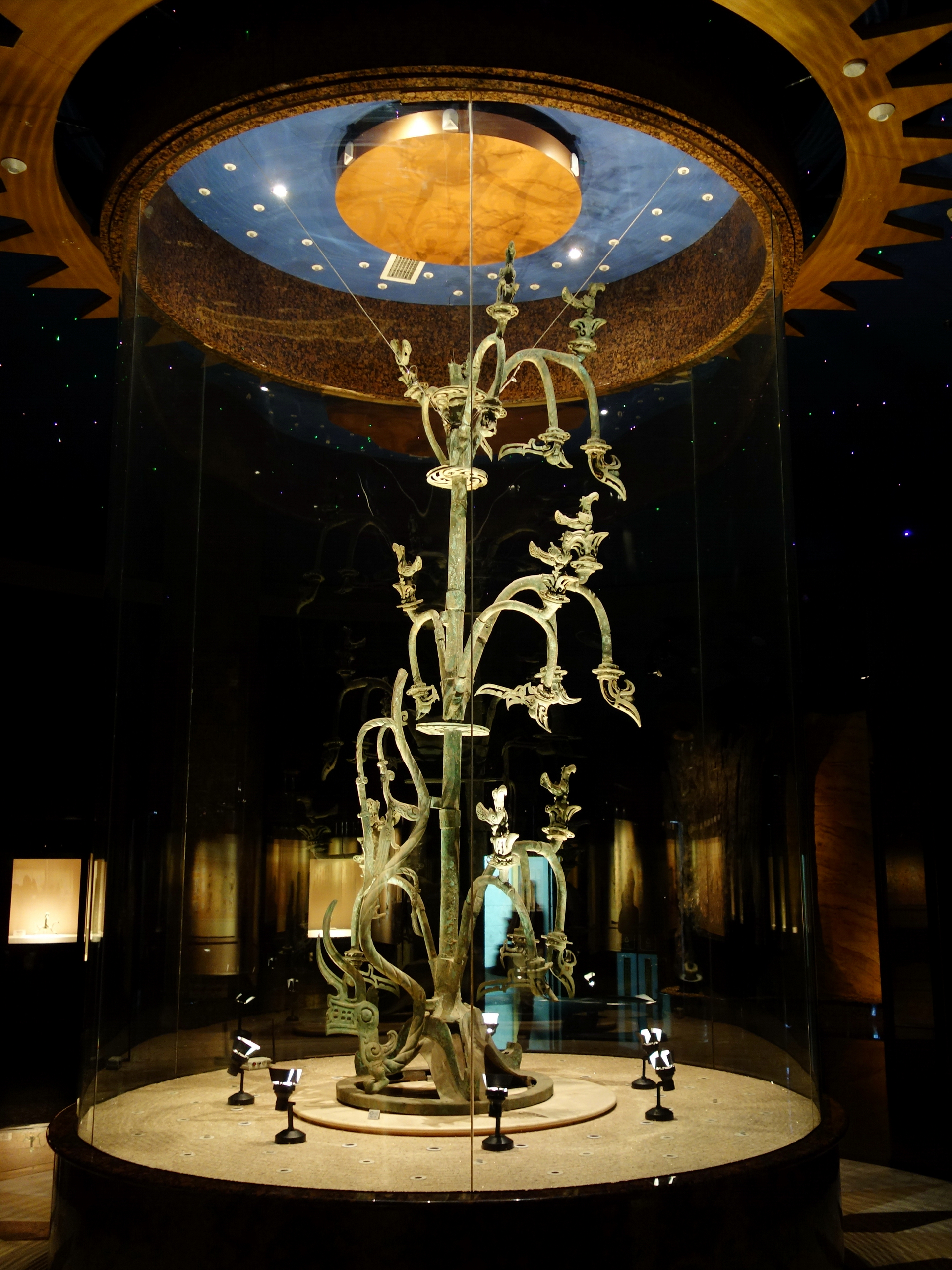
A massive bronze Sacred Tree (height 396 cm) from Sanxingdui

The timeline of the culture of the Sanxingdui site is thought to be divided into several phases. The Sanxingdui culture that corresponds to periods II-III of the site, was a mysterious civilization in southern China. This culture is contemporaneous with the Shang dynasty, but it developed a different artistic style of bronze-making from the Shang. The first phase that corresponds to period I of the site belongs to the Baodun. After the final phase (period IV), the culture was succeeded by the state of Ba and kingdom of Shu. Speculation regarding the end of the Sanxingdui culture includes that it might have been the result of natural disasters (evidence of massive flooding and an earthquake were found), or invasion by another culture.

The culture was governed by a strong central theocracy, with trade links to bronze from Yin and ivory from South Asia.

=== Metallurgy ===
This ancient culture had a well-developed bronze casting industry that permitted the manufacture of many impressive articles, such as the world's oldest life-sized standing human statue (260 centimetres [100 in] high, 180 kilograms (400 lb)), and a bronze tree with birds, flowers, and ornaments (396 centimetres [156 in]), which some have identified as renderings of the Fusang tree of Chinese mythology.

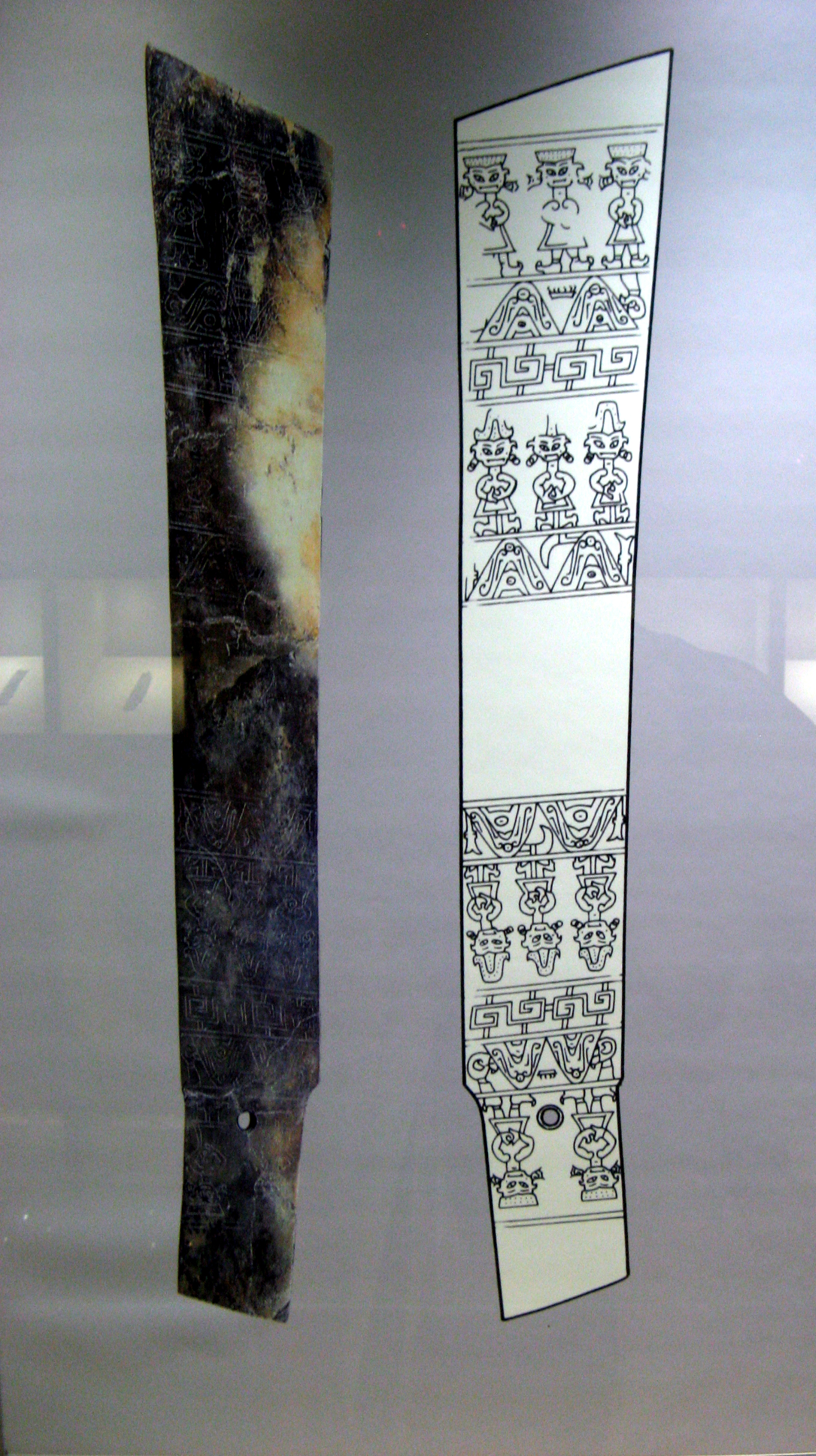
A large jade zhang blade, length 54 cm (21 in), Sanxingdui Museum

The most striking finds were dozens of large bronze masks and heads (at least six heads with gold foil masks originally attached) represented with angular human features, exaggerated almond-shaped eyes, some with protruding pupils, and large upper ears. Many Sanxingdui bronze faces had traces of paint smears: black on the disproportionately large eyes and eyebrows, and vermilion on the lips, nostrils, and ear holes.

According to the French sinologist Corinne Debaine-Francfort, these colours provide evidence for ritual practices that were very different from those of the Shang dynasty. Vermilion is interpreted "not be coloring but something ritually offered for the head to taste, smell, and hear (or something that gave it the power to breathe, hear, and speak)". Based upon the design of these heads, archaeologists believe they were mounted on wooden supports or totems, perhaps dressed in clothing.

Liu Yang concludes "masked ritual played a vital role in community life of the ancient Sanxingdui inhabitants", and he characterizes these bronze ritual masks as something that may have been worn by a shi (尸; 'corpse') "personator, impersonator; ceremonial representative of a dead relative".

The shi was generally a close, young relative who wore a costume (possibly including a mask) reproducing the features of the dead person. The shi was an impersonator, that is, a person serving as a reminder of the ancestor to whom sacrifice was being offered. During such a ceremony, the impersonator was much more than an actor in a drama. Although the exact meaning may have been different, the group of Sanxingdui masked figures in bronze all have the character of an impersonator. It is likely the masks were used to impersonate and identify with certain supernatural beings in order to effect some communal good.

Another scholar compares these "bulging-eyed, big-eared, bronze heads and masks" with "eye-idols" (effigies with large eyes and open mouths designed to induce hallucinations) in Julian Jaynes's bicameral mentality hypothesis; and proposes, "[i]t is possible that southern Chinese personators wore these hypnotic bronze masks, recursively representing the spirit of a dead ancestor with a mask that represents a face disguised by a mask".

Other bronze artifacts include birds with eagle-like bills, tigers, a large snake, zoomorphic masks, bells, and what appears to be a bronze spoked wheel but is more likely to be decoration from an ancient shield. Apart from bronze, Sanxingdui finds included jade artifacts consistent with earlier neolithic cultures in China, such as cong and zhang.

=== Cosmology ===
As far back as Neolithic times, East Asians identified the four quadrants of the sky with animals: Azure Dragon of the East, Vermilion Bird of the South, White Tiger of the West, and Black Tortoise of the North. Each of these Four Symbols (Chinese constellation) was associated with a constellation that was visible in the relevant season: the dragon in the spring, the bird in the summer, etc.

Since these four animals—birds, dragons, snakes, and tigers—predominate the finds at Sanxingdui, the bronzes might represent the universe. It is unclear whether they formed part of ritual events designed to communicate with the spirits of the universe (or ancestral spirits). As no written records remain it is difficult to determine the intended uses of objects found. Some believe that the continued prevalence of depictions of these animals, especially in the later Han period, was an attempt by humans to "fit into" their understanding of their world, their cosmology.

== Images ==
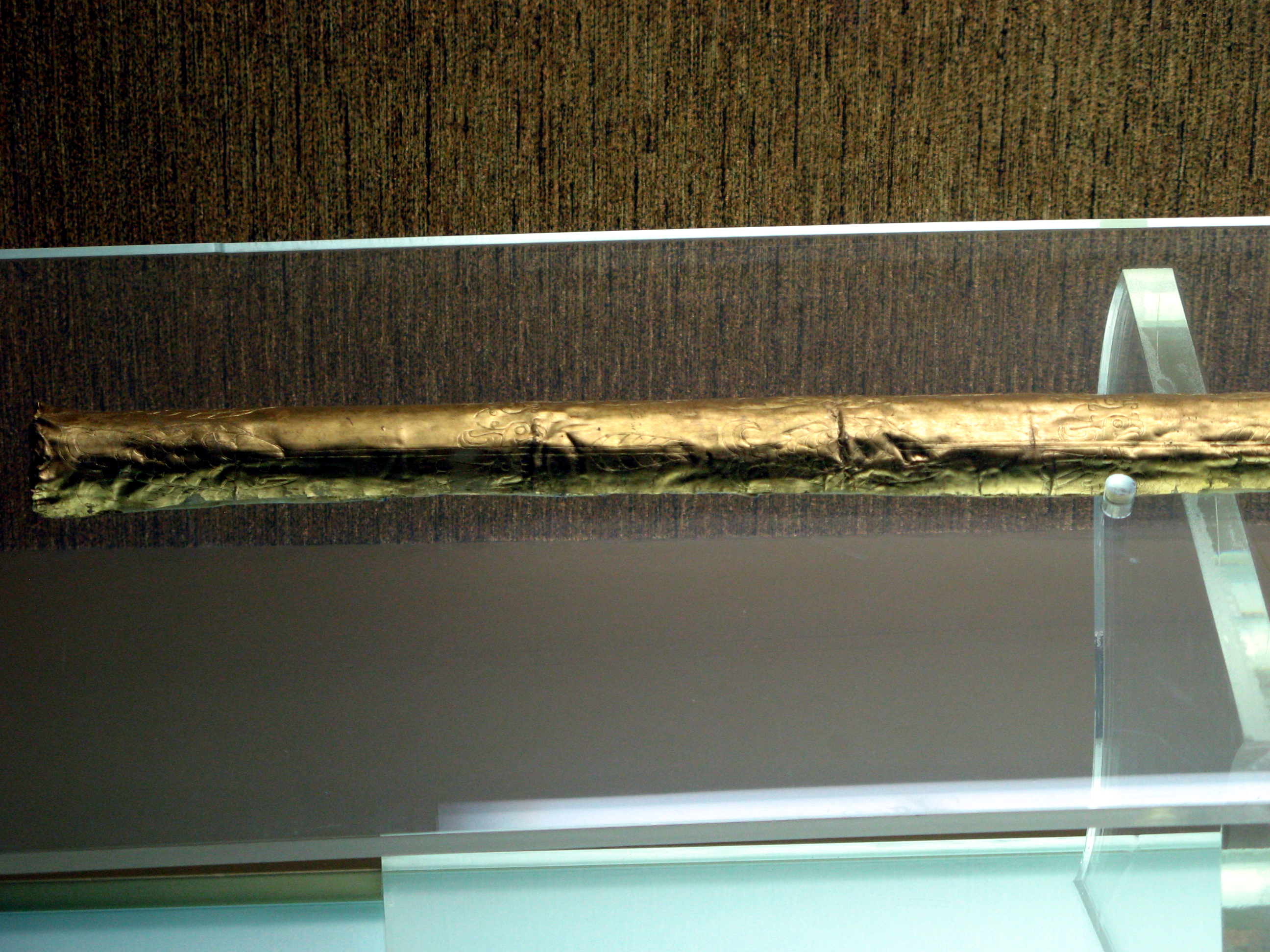
A gold scepter

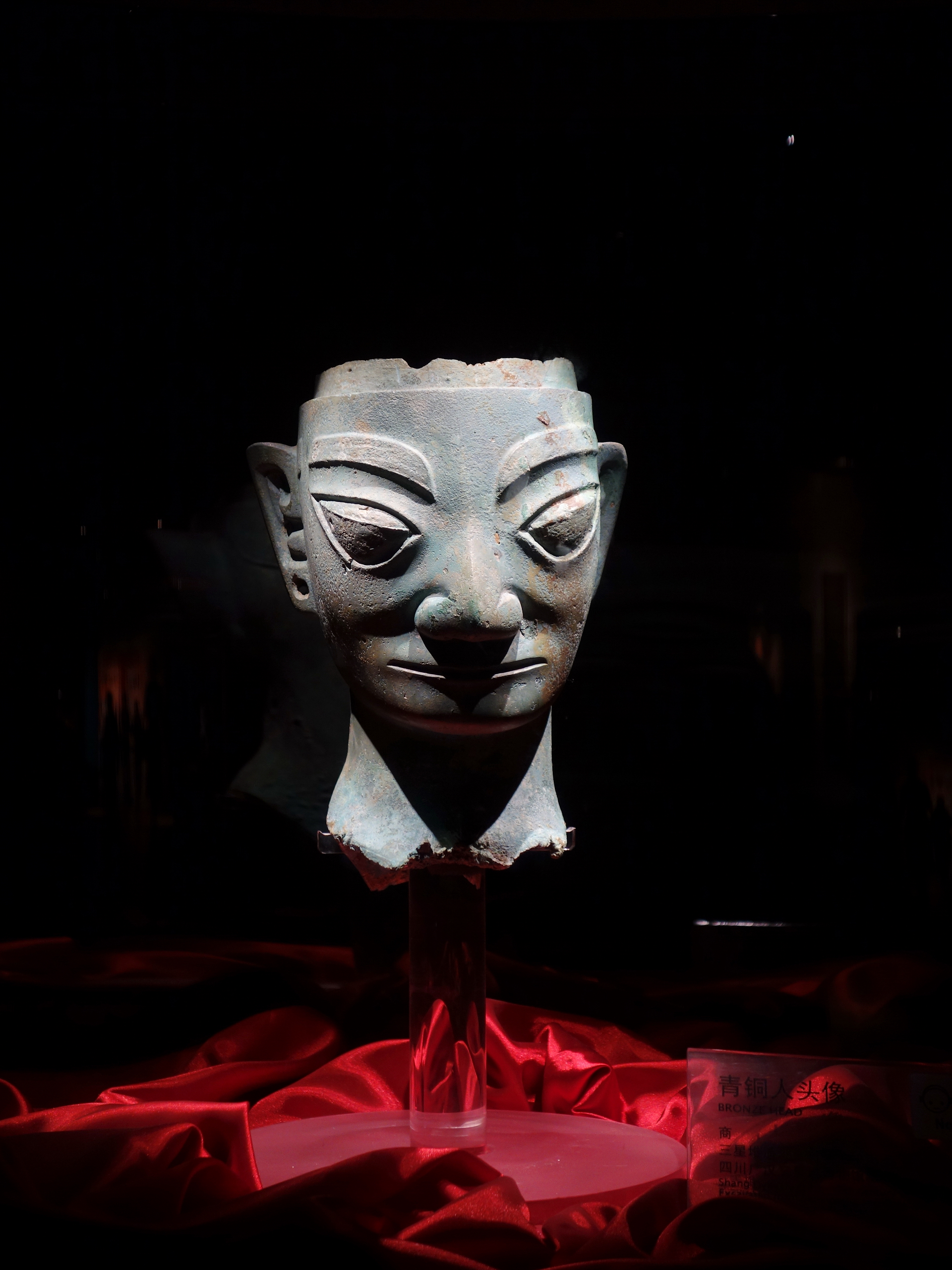
Sanxingdui Bronze heads

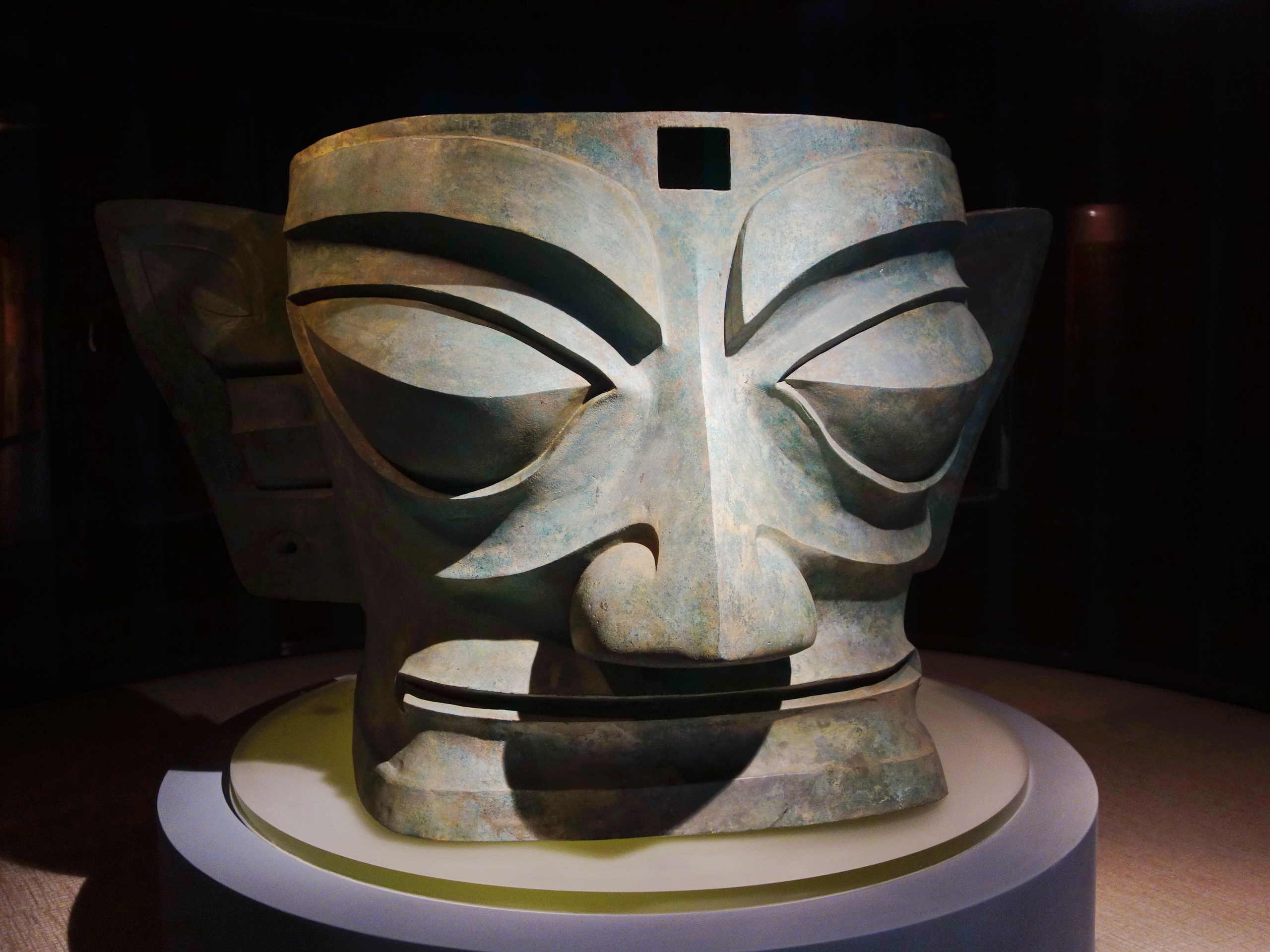
Sanxingdui Bronze masks

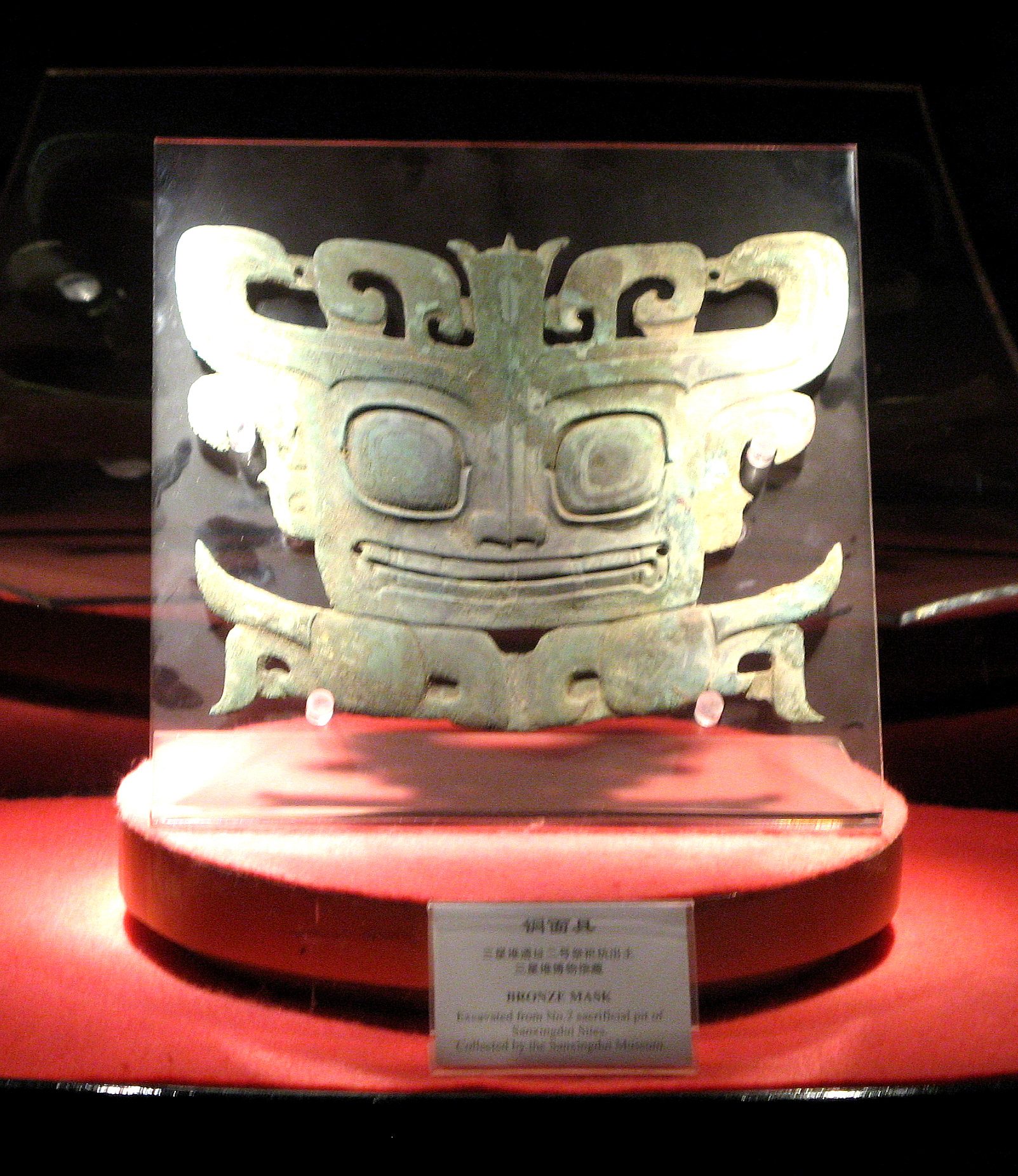
Bronze animal masks

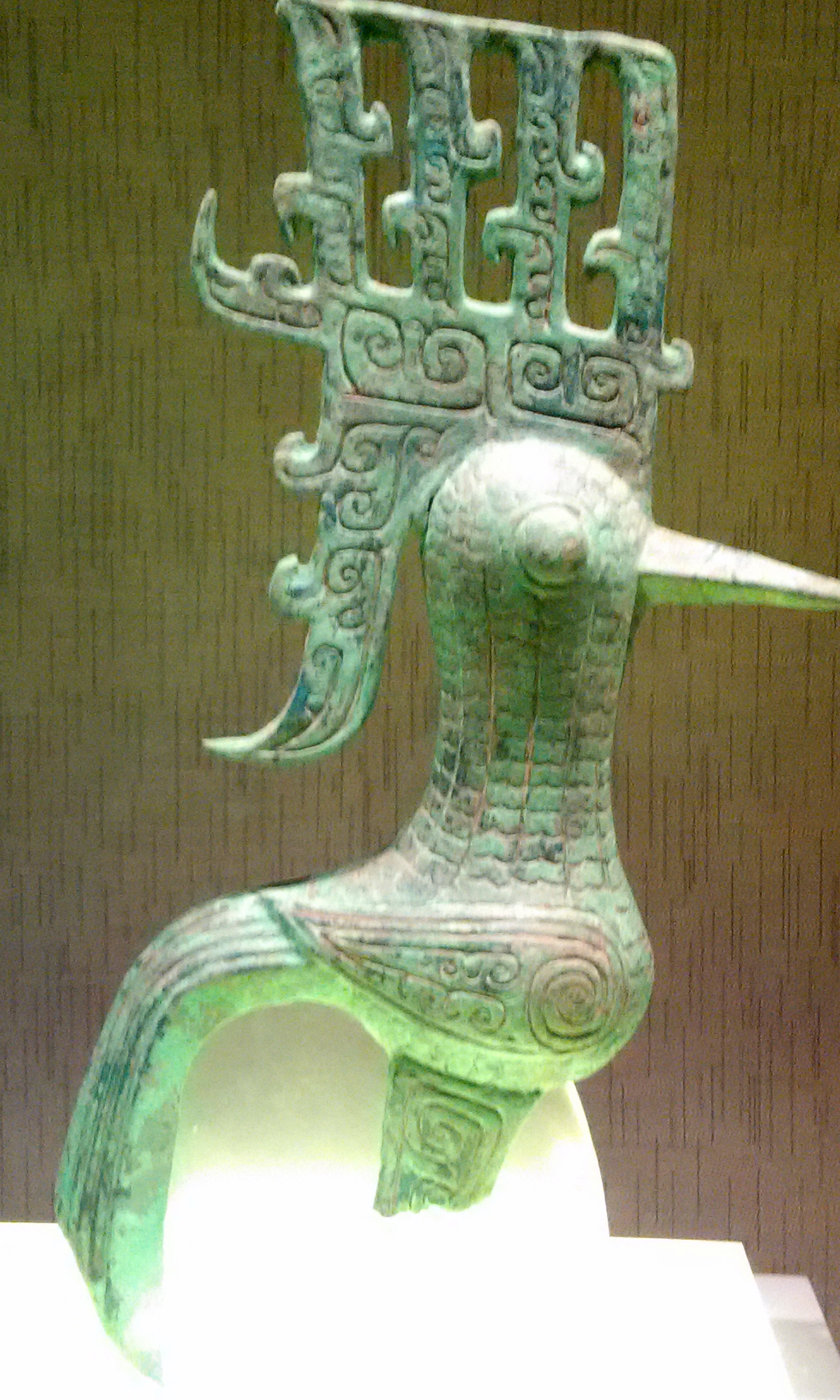
Bronze bird

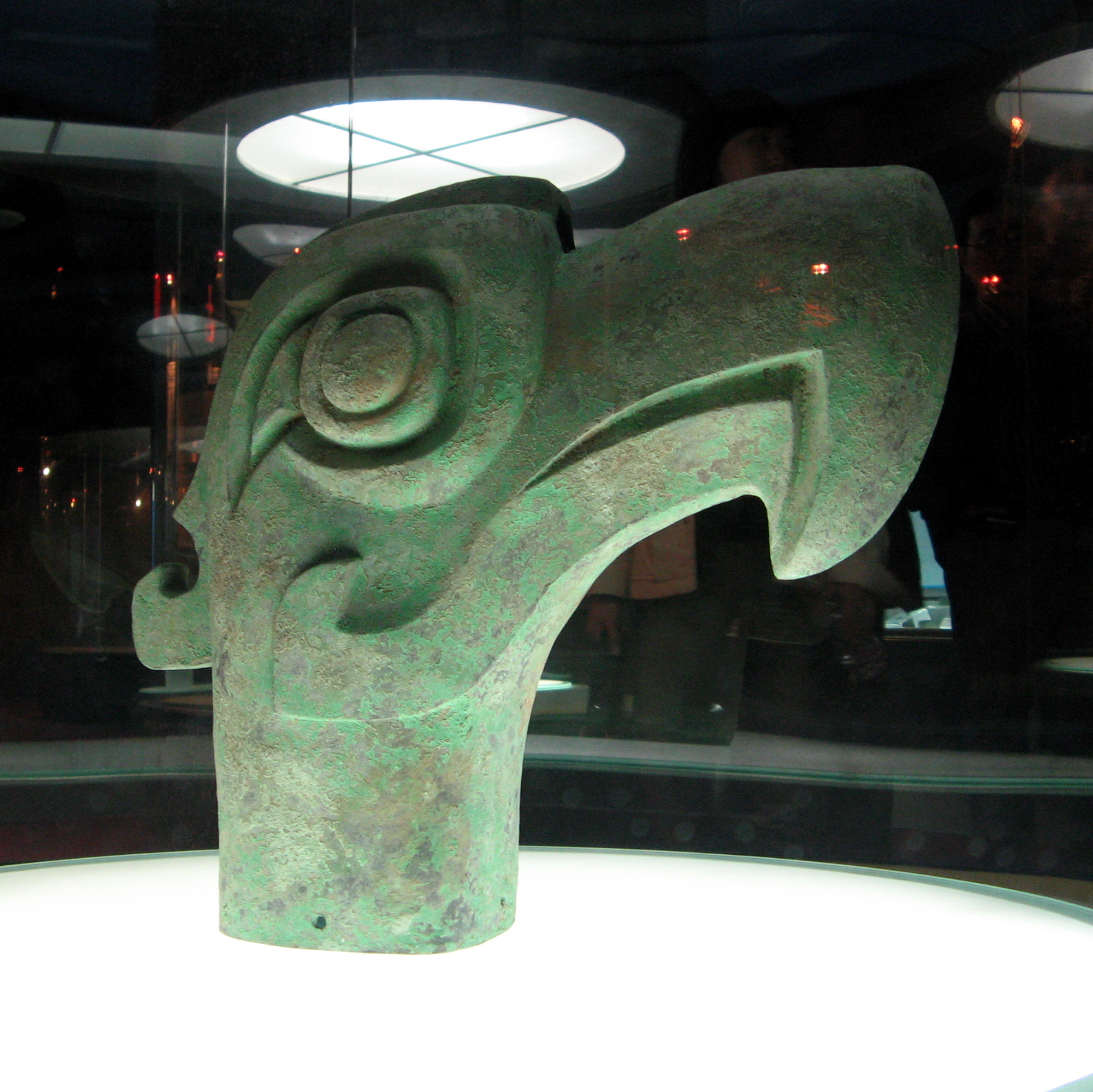
Sanxingdui bronze head of a bird

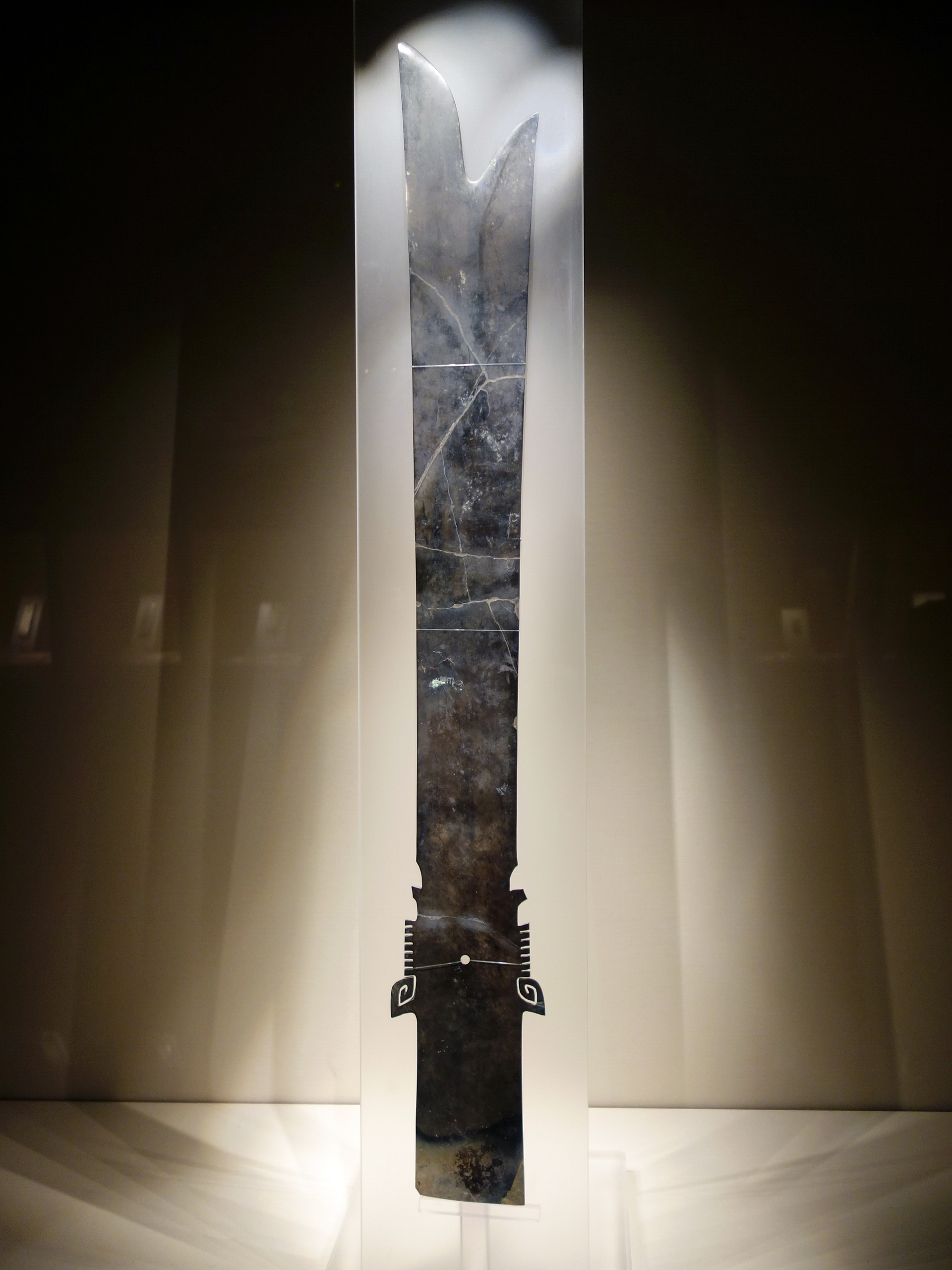
Jade zhang blade

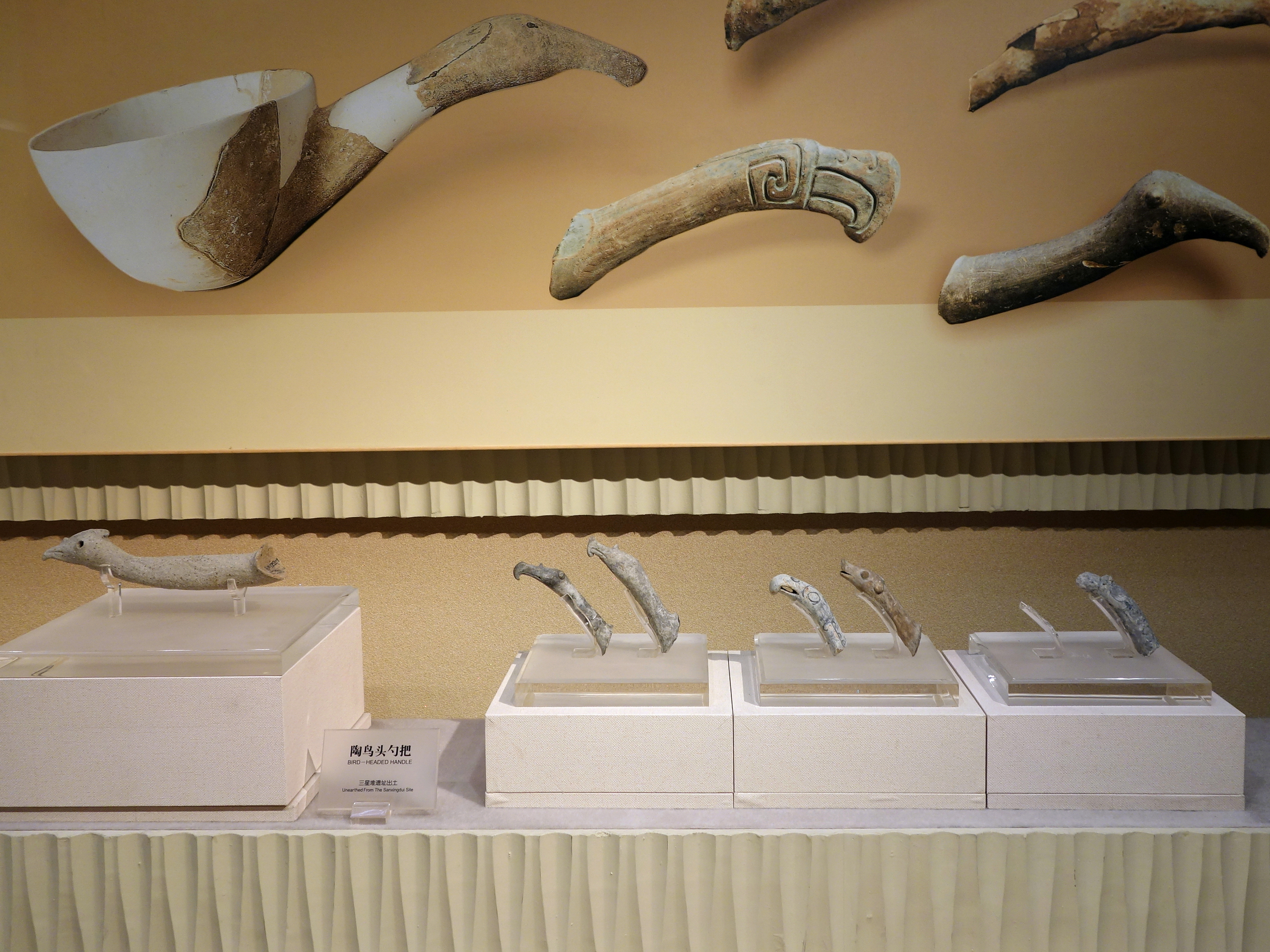
Bird-headed handle

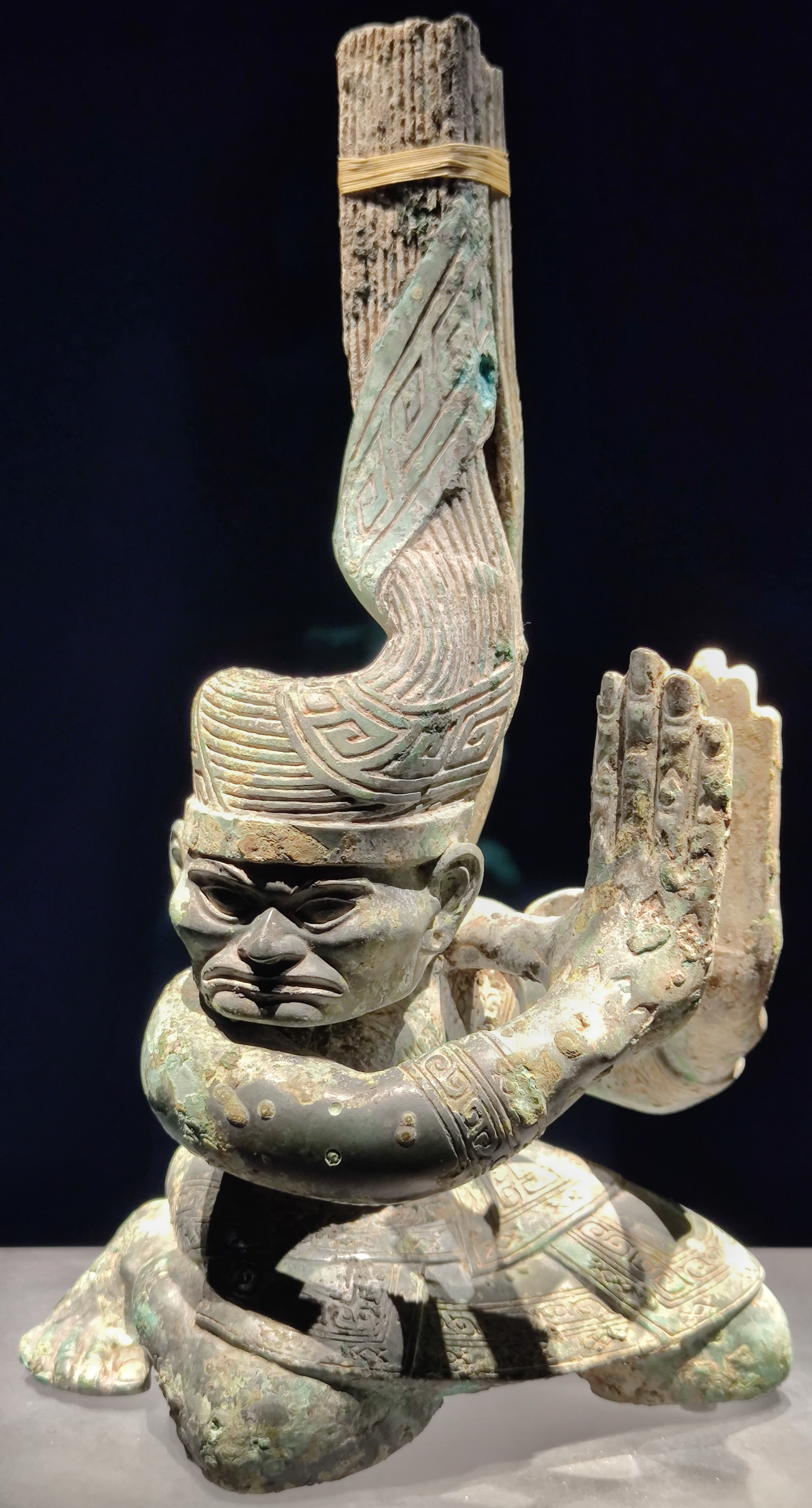
Sanxingdui Bronze figure excavated in 2021

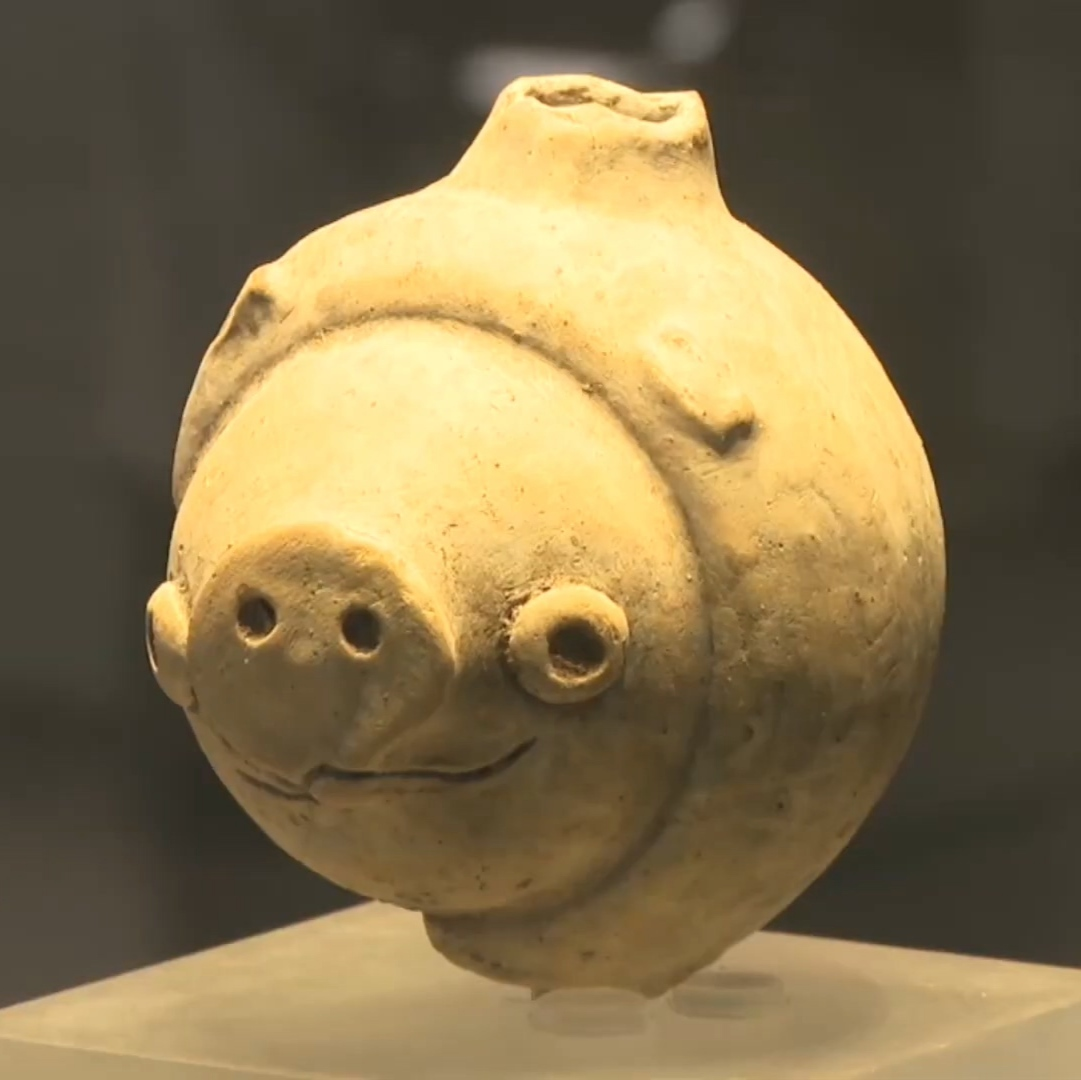
Pottery swine excavated in 2020

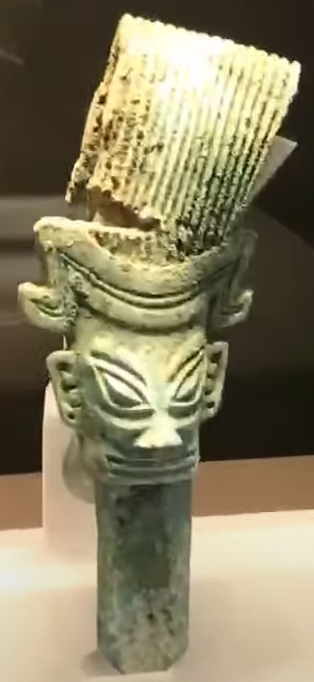
Bronze figure wearing an officer's cap with towering headdress, excavated in 2021

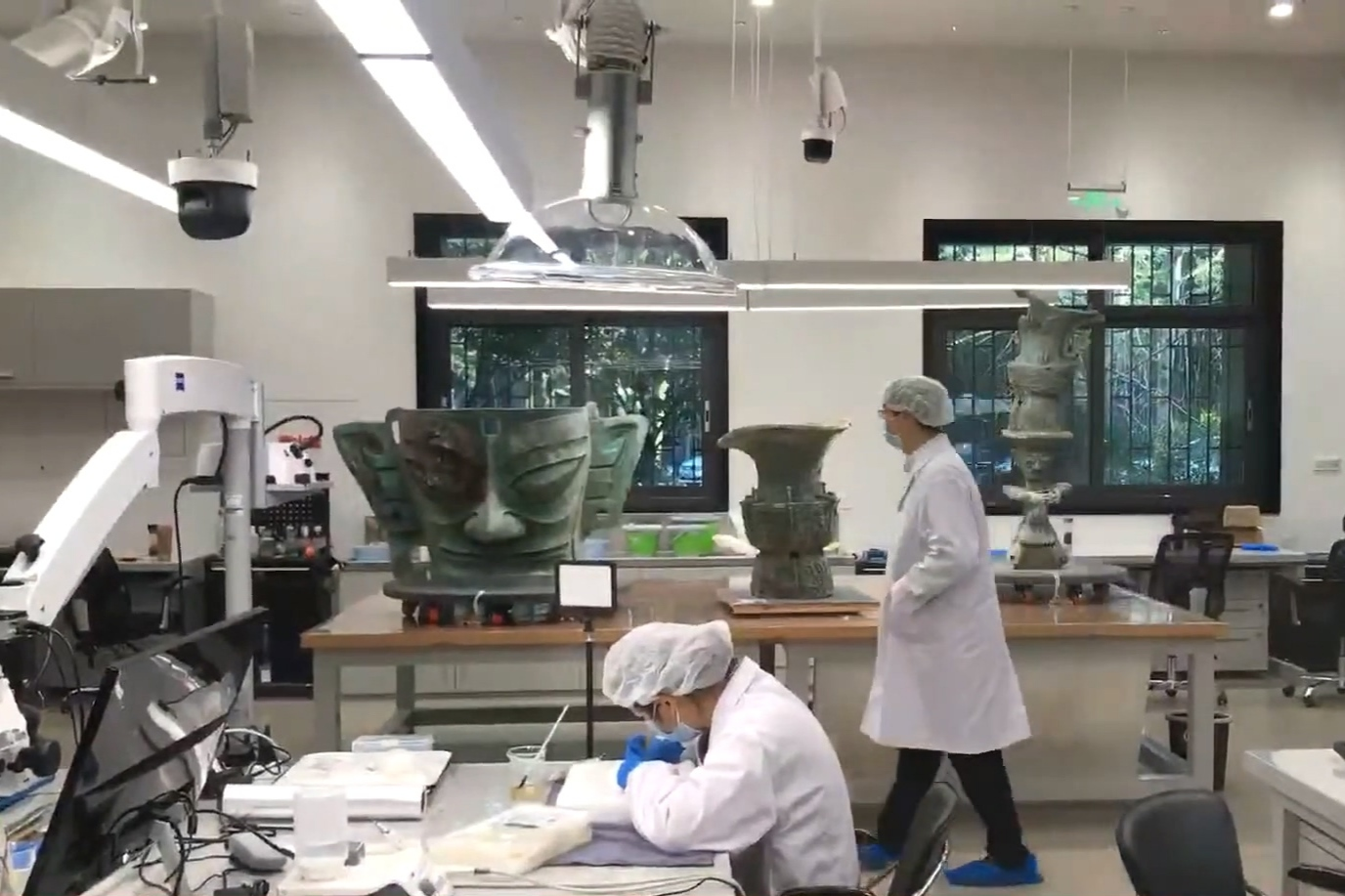
Sanxingdui Cultural Relics Protection And Restoration Hall opened in December 2021, where tourists can watch the restoration work up close

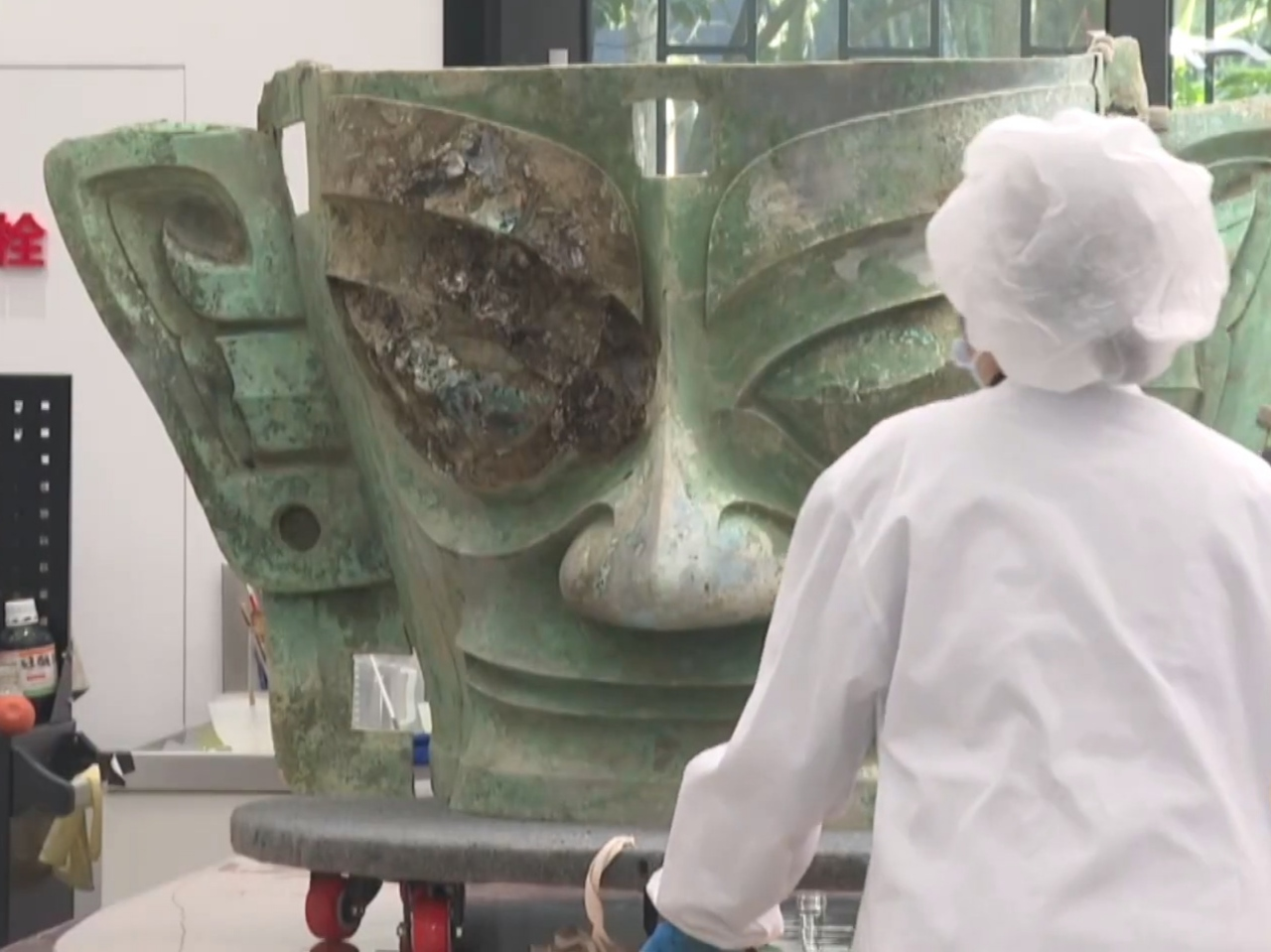
Giant bronze mask

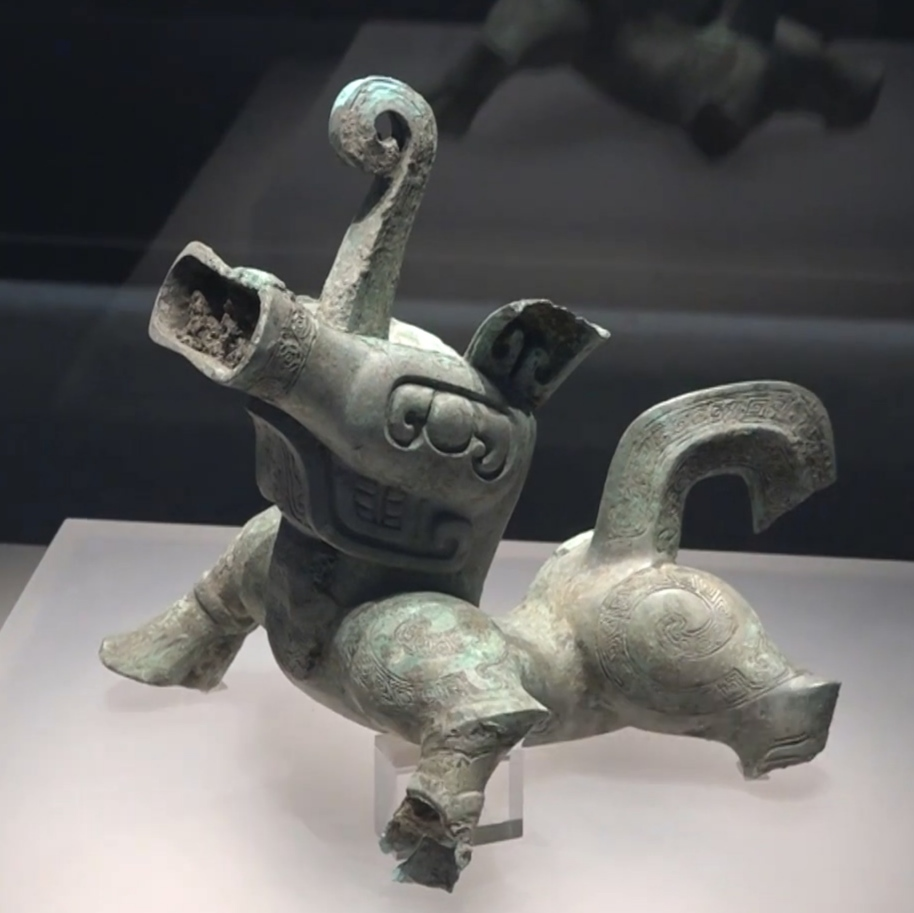
Bronze mythical beast excavated in 2021

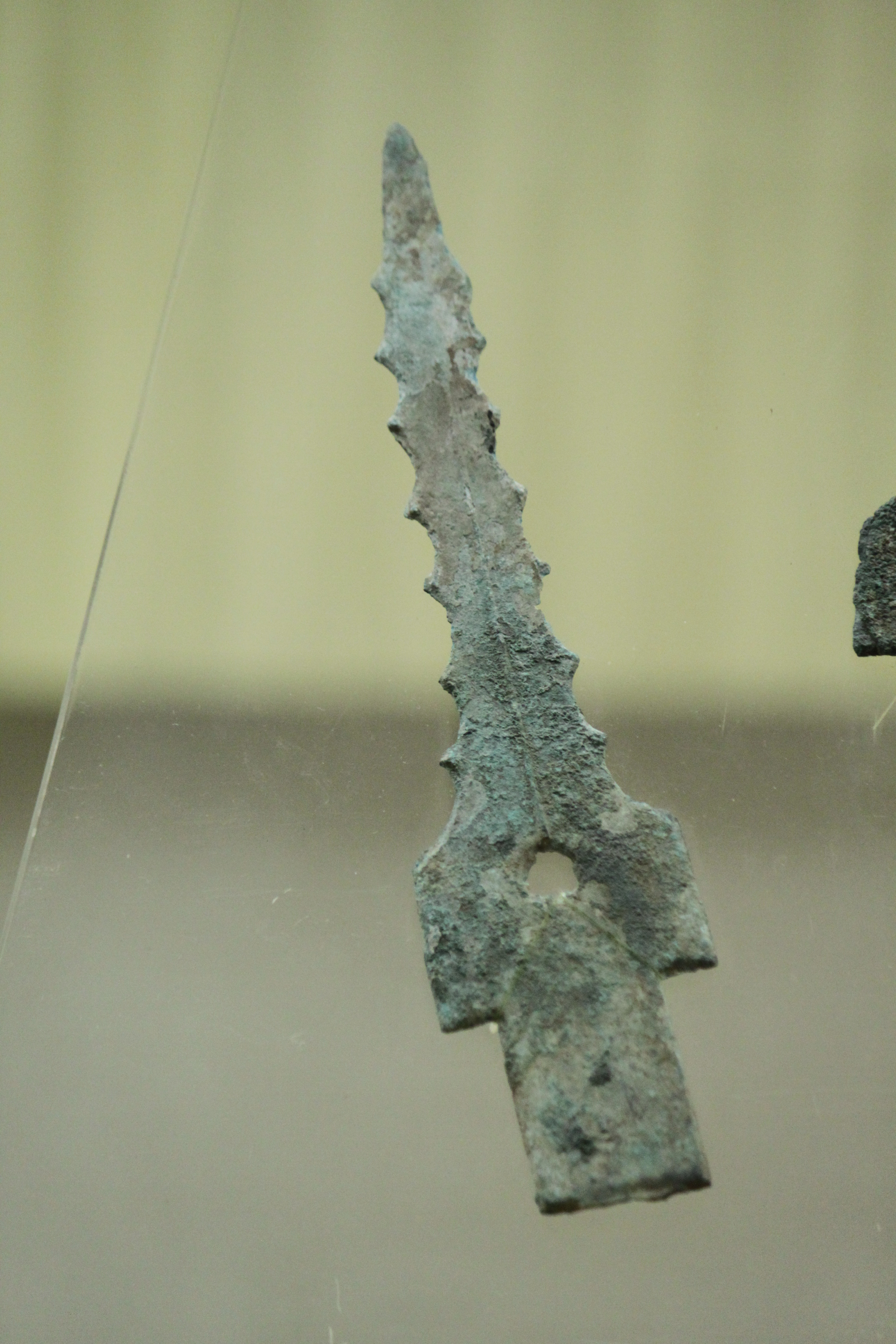
Bronze weapon from Sanxingdui

== See also ==
- Clothing in ancient Shu
- Erligang culture
- Erlitou culture
- History of China
- History of metallurgy in China
- Jinsha
- List of Bronze Age sites in China
- List of Neolithic cultures of China
- Tombs of boat-shaped coffins
- Wucheng culture
