= Joint tombs of boat-shaped coffins =

Archaeological site in Chengdu, China

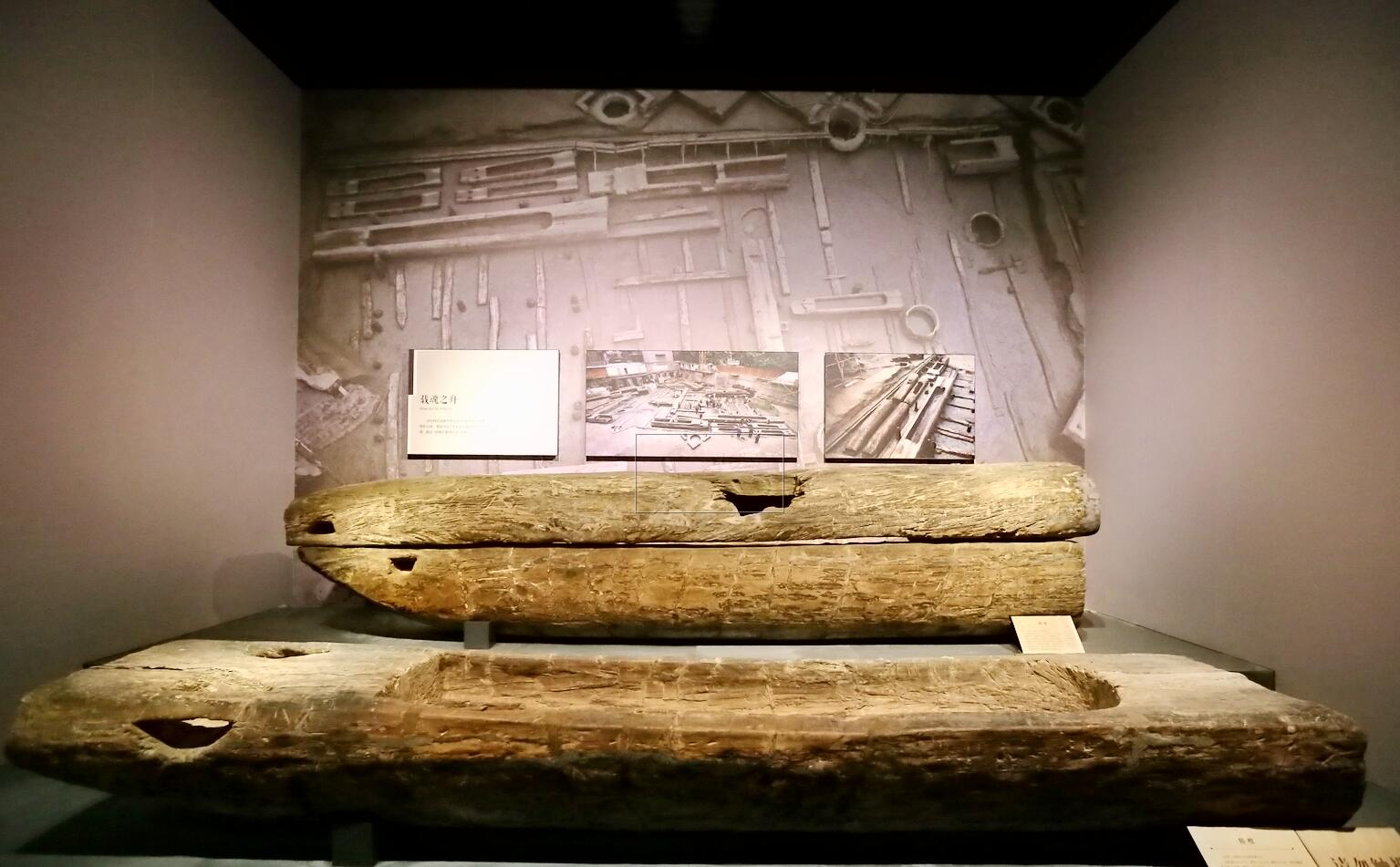
A boat-shaped coffin in Chengdu Museum

The joint tombs of boat-shaped coffins (Chinese: 成都古蜀船棺合葬墓; pinyin: Chéngdū Gǔ Shǔ chuánguān hézàngmù; lit. 'Chengdu ancient Shu boat coffin joint burial tomb') are tombs of the ancient kingdom of Shu discovered in Chengdu, Sichuan, China, coinciding with the Spring and Autumn period (770–476 BC) and the Warring States period (476–221 BC). and apparently also occurred during the Qin dynasty (221–206BC).

In 2013, the Chinese government placed the tombs of boat-shaped coffins, along with Sanxingdui and Jinsha site, on the UNESCO Tentative List, indicating that China plans to consider the sites for future nomination as a UNESCO World Heritage Site.

== Discoveries ==
In 2000, a number of boat-shaped coffins were found at a tomb site in central Chengdu. This tomb is believed to be royal from the former kingdom of Shu coinciding with the Warring States period in China. The tomb measure 30.5 × 20.3m and has a depth of 2.5m. The tomb contains a total of 17 coffins and is dated 400BC. The biggest boat-shaped coffin is 18.8m long and 1.5m wide and contains a large number of cultural objects.

In early 2017, nearly 200 tombs with boat-shaped coffins were found in an area as big as two football pitches in the village of Shuangyuan in Dawang in Qingbaijiang district outside Chengdu. Numerous bronze artifacts were uncovered in the tombs.

In 2018, it was announced that tombs with 60 boat-shaped coffins placed in four rows were found in the village Pujiang County in Sichuan. In the tombs more than 300 artefacts of ceramics, bronze, iron, and bamboo were unearthed. Also, weapons, coins, and glass pearls have been excavated. The pearls were likely to be imported through the Silk Road. The discoveries are dated to the Warring States period and the Qin dynasty (221–206BC).

== See also ==
- Hanging coffins
- Ship burial
