= Cancong =

Chinese legendary figure, Shu dynasty

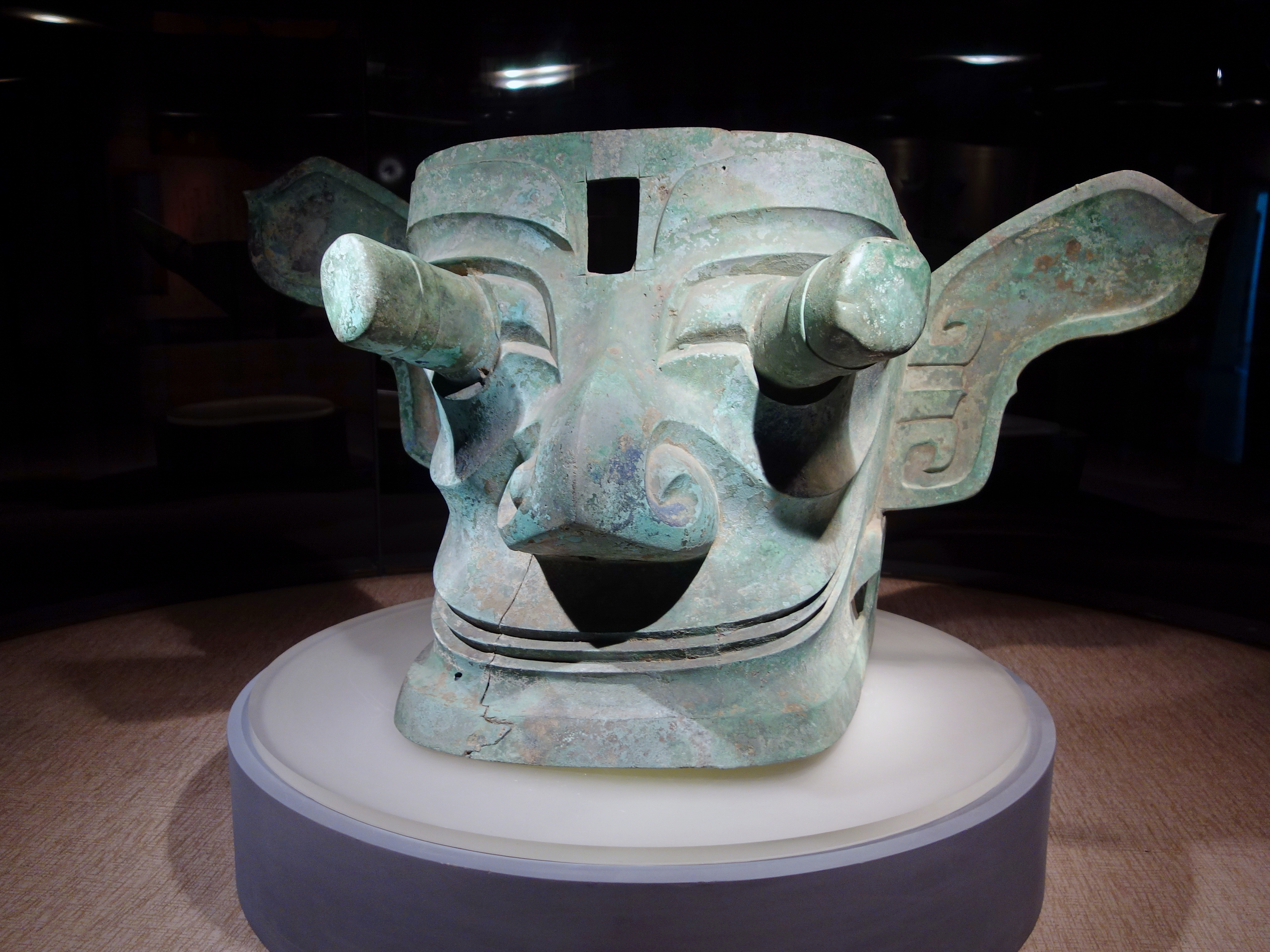
A large bronze head with protruding or "bulging" eyes unearthed at Sanxingdui. Believed to represent Cancong.

Cancong (traditional Chinese: 蠶叢; simplified Chinese: 蚕丛; pinyin: Cáncóng) is a semi-legendary figure and king associated with the ancient Shu kingdom, located in present-day Sichuan, China. Often recognized for his distinctive physical feature of “bulging eyes,” Cancong is celebrated in both Chinese mythology and history as a pivotal figure in the establishment of Shu culture and civilization.

== Background and mythology ==
Cancong is traditionally regarded as the first ruler of Shu and is often mentioned in historical texts, such as the Huayang Guo Zhi, which documents the history and geography of the Shu region. His reign is associated with significant advancements in agriculture, the introduction of silk production, and the establishment of ritual practices that shaped the cultural identity of the Shu people.

The blending of historical accounts and mythological elements surrounding Cancong illustrates his significance as both a leader and a cultural figure in Chinese history. His unique physical features have led to interpretations of him as a shamanic or divine figure, as reflected in various artifacts uncovered at archaeological sites linked to the Shu civilization. This suggests a possible reverence for rulers like him in ancient rituals.

== History and archaeology ==
While Cancong's life is shrouded in myth, archaeological findings from the Sanxingdui and Jinsha sites provide insights into the cultural context of his era. Excavations at Sanxingdui, which date back to approximately 1200 BCE, have revealed numerous bronze artifacts characterized by exaggerated eyes, paralleling descriptions of Cancong. These artifacts suggest that Cancong played an essential role in ancient Shu culture.

The discoveries at the sites underscore the unique spiritual and cultural practices of the Shu civilization, showcasing advanced artistic and ritualistic traditions that may relate to the legacy of Cancong. However, this proposed relationship is still a matter of active debate as no direct evidence links the artifacts to Cancong's recorded events or achievements.

== Legacy ==
Cancong remains an iconic symbol of Sichuan's cultural heritage, representing the mystical origins of the ancient Shu kingdom. His contributions to agriculture and silk production are foundational to the historical narrative of the region, influencing later developments in Chinese civilization. The reverence for Cancong and his mythical status resonate in modern Sichuan, where his image is sometimes invoked in cultural representations and local folklore.

== See also ==
- Canshen, a deity that incorporates elements of Cancong, often seen as a divine figure in Chinese folk religion.

== Sources ==
- Yang, L.; An, D.; Turner, J.A. (2008). "Cancong". Handbook of Chinese Mythology. Handbooks of world mythology. Oxford University Press. pp. 82–84. ISBN 978-0-19-533263-6.
