= Baodun culture =

Archaeological culture in China

Coordinates: 30.4502°N 103.7508°E

- Geographical range: Sichuan Basin
- Period: Neolithic
- Dates: c. 2700 – c. 1700 BC
- Type site: Baodun
- Major sites: Yufu, Mangcheng
- Followed by: Sanxingdui

Chinese name
- Traditional Chinese: 寶墩文化
- Simplified Chinese: 宝墩文化
Transcriptions
Standard Mandarin
- Hanyu Pinyin: Bǎodūn wénhuà

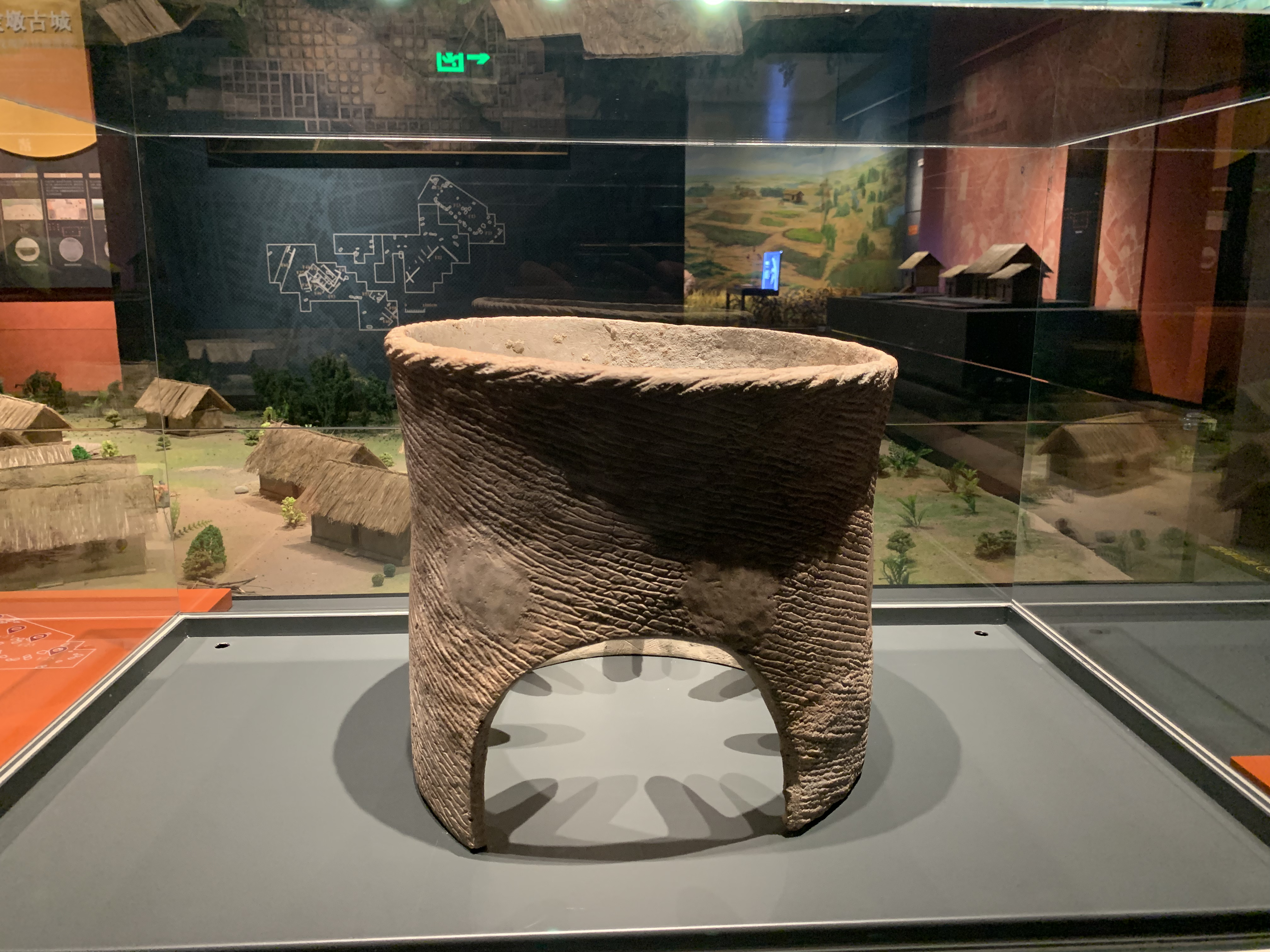
Pottery stove, Baodun Site Museum

General location of the Baodun culture, and contemporary Asian polities c. 2000 BCE

The Baodun culture (2700 BC – 1700 BC) was a Neolithic culture centered on the Chengdu Plain in Sichuan, China.

== Dates ==
Archaeologists have divided the culture into four phases (I-IV). The only radiocarbon dates for the Baodun Culture come from Bianduishan. Two dates were calibrated using CalPal software to 2467 ± 347 BC and 1993 ± 335 BC.

== Sites ==
Ten settlements from the culture have been found. The first six sites discovered were: the type site at Baodun in Xinjin County, the site at Mangcheng in Dujiangyan City, the site at Yufu in Wenjiang County, the site at Zizhu in Chongzhou, the site at Shuanghe in Chongzhou, and the site at Gucheng in Pi County. Yufucun is the second largest site associated with the Baodun culture.

All of the settlements straddle the Min River. The settlement walls were covered with pebbles, a feature unique to the Baodun culture. The pottery from the culture share some similarities with Sanxingdui. The inhabitants lived in wattle and daub houses. The earliest evidence for rice and foxtail millet agriculture in southwest China was discovered at the type site at Baodun.

The site at Yufu is also surrounded by two walls: The inner wall covers and area of around 25 ha (250,000 m^{2}), while the outer wall covers and area of around 40 ha (400,000 m^{2}). The site at Mangcheng is also surrounded by two, pounded earth walls: the inner wall covers an area of around 7.2 ha (72,000 m^{2}), while the outer wall covers an area of around 10.5 ha (105,000 m^{2}). The majority of buildings were made from wattle and daub technology. The site at Gucheng is surrounded by a wall enclosing an area of around 30.4 ha (304,000 m^{2}). The sites at Zizhu and Shuanghe are also surrounded by double walls.

=== Baodun ===
The Baodun type site was discovered in 1950. The type site is the oldest and largest site associated with the Baodun culture. This culture has the largest walled Neolithic area in China. Baodun is surrounded by two walls: the inner wall covers an area of around 66 ha (660,000 m^{2}), while the outer wall covers an area of around 245 ha (2,450,000 m^{2}). Estimates of the labour required to build both walls suggest that they would have taken 100 people over 5 years to build. It is unclear whether the area between the two walls was residential, agricultural, or used for different purposes.

Estimated labor required for the production of walls around the Baodun Culture sites
Site	Total wall length (in m)	Estimated volume of the wall (in m³)	Labor at 1 m³/person/day (in person-years)	Labor at 2 m³/person/day (in person-years)	Labor at 3 m³/person/day (in person-years)
Baodun	3,200	243,200	666	333	222
Baodun (outer wall)	>5,200	c. 130,000	356	178	119
Mangcheng	1,900	47,500	130	65	43
Shuanghe	2,800	108,750	298	149	99
Gucheng	2,220	116,550	319	160	106
Yufu	2,000	45,000	123	62	41

== Agriculture ==
Rice and foxtail millet were both grown at Baodun, with rice dominating. Many weeds associated with paddy rice cultivation were also discovered at Baodun. The remains of Job's tears, Vicia, two types of Vigna, beefsteak plant, and Crataegus were also discovered at Baodun.

Rice has also been found at Mangcheng.

== See also ==
- List of Neolithic cultures of China
- Jinsha
- Sanxingdui
- Three Sovereigns and Five Emperors
- Xia dynasty
