= Shu (kingdom) =

Ancient kingdom in modern-day Sichuan

Shu 蜀
- ?–c. 316 BC
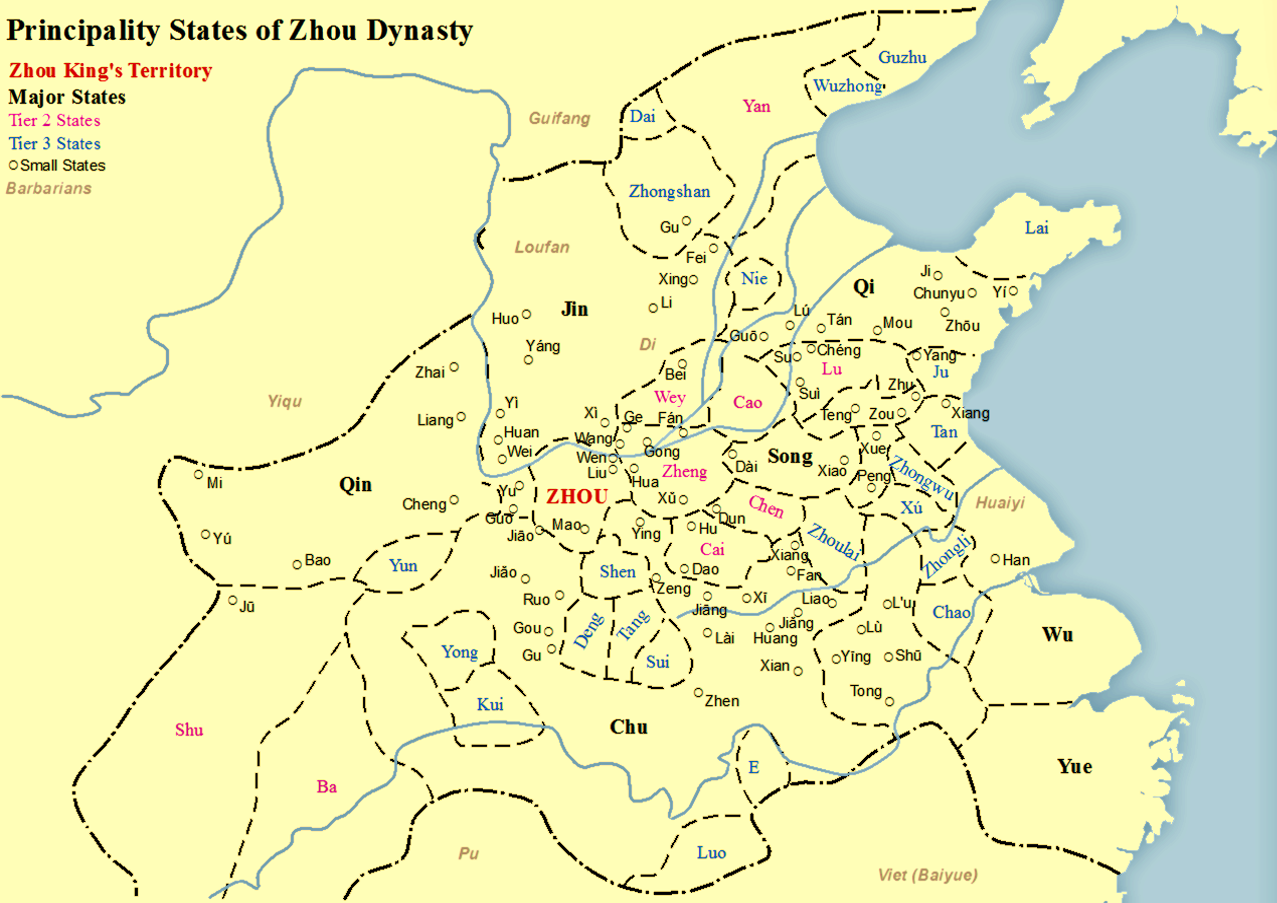
- Map showing the Kingdom of Shu during the Zhou dynasty
- Government: Monarchy
- Historical era: Spring and Autumn period
  - Established: ?
  - Battle of Muye: c. 1046 BC
  - Conquered by Qin: c. 316 BC
Succeeded by
Qin (state)

Shu
- "Shu" in seal script (top) and regular (bottom) Chinese characters
- Chinese: 蜀
Transcriptions
Standard Mandarin
- Hanyu Pinyin: Shǔ
- Bopomofo: ㄕㄨˇ
- Wade–Giles: Shu^{3}
- Tongyong Pinyin: Shǔ
- IPA: [ʂù]
Wu
- Suzhounese: Zoq^{8}
Yue: Cantonese
- Yale Romanization: Suhk
- Jyutping: Suk^{6}
- IPA: [sʊk̚˨]
Southern Min
- Tâi-lô: Sio̍k
Old Chinese
- Baxter–Sagart (2014): *[d]ok

Shu (Chinese: 蜀; Pinyin: Shǔ; former romanization: Shuh), also known as Ancient Shu (Chinese: 古蜀; pinyin: Gǔ Shǔ) in historiography, was an ancient kingdom in what is now Sichuan Province. It was based on the Chengdu Plain, in the western Sichuan basin with some extension northeast to the upper Han River valley. To the east was the Ba tribal confederation. Further east down the Han and Yangtze rivers was the State of Chu. To the north over the Qinling Mountains was the State of Qin. To the west and south were tribal peoples of little military power.

This independent Shu state was conquered by the state of Qin in 316 BC. Recent archaeological discoveries at Sanxingdui and Jinsha thought to be sites of Shu culture indicate the presence of a unique civilization in this region before the Qin conquest.

In subsequent periods of Chinese history the Sichuan area continued to be referred to as Shu after this ancient state, and later states founded in the same region were also called Shu.

== Sanxingdui culture ==
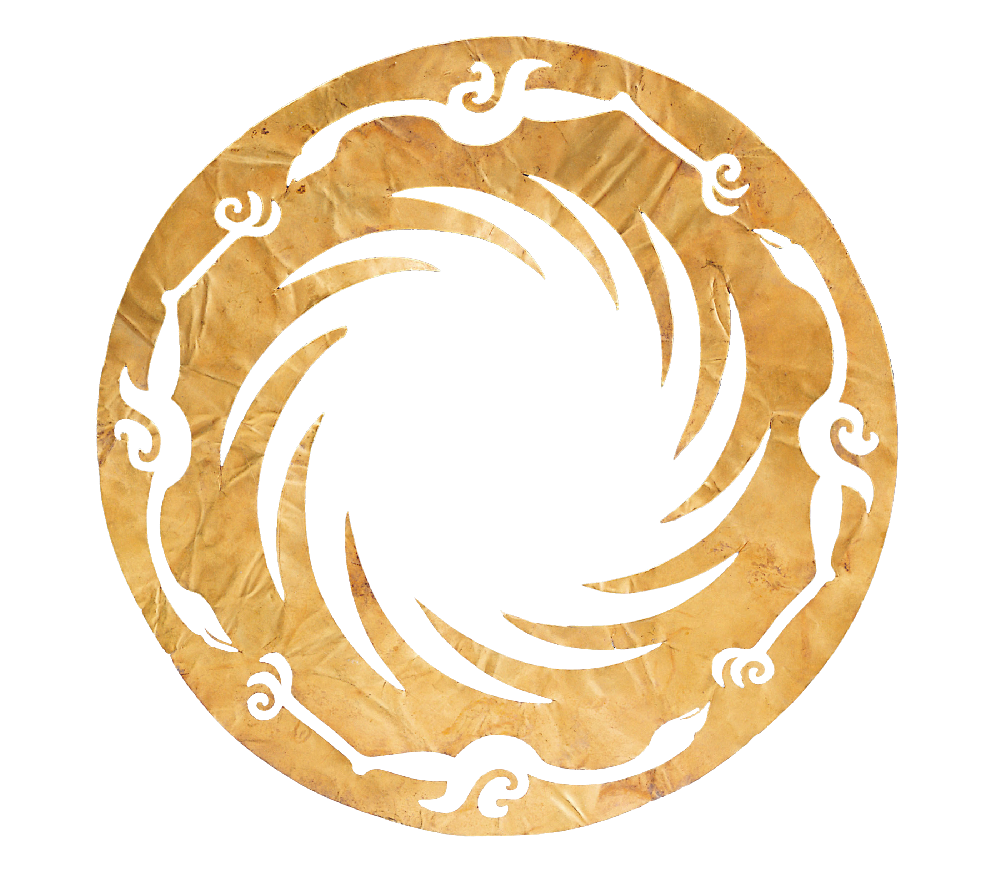
Golden Sun Bird, believed to be a totem of the ancient Shu people.

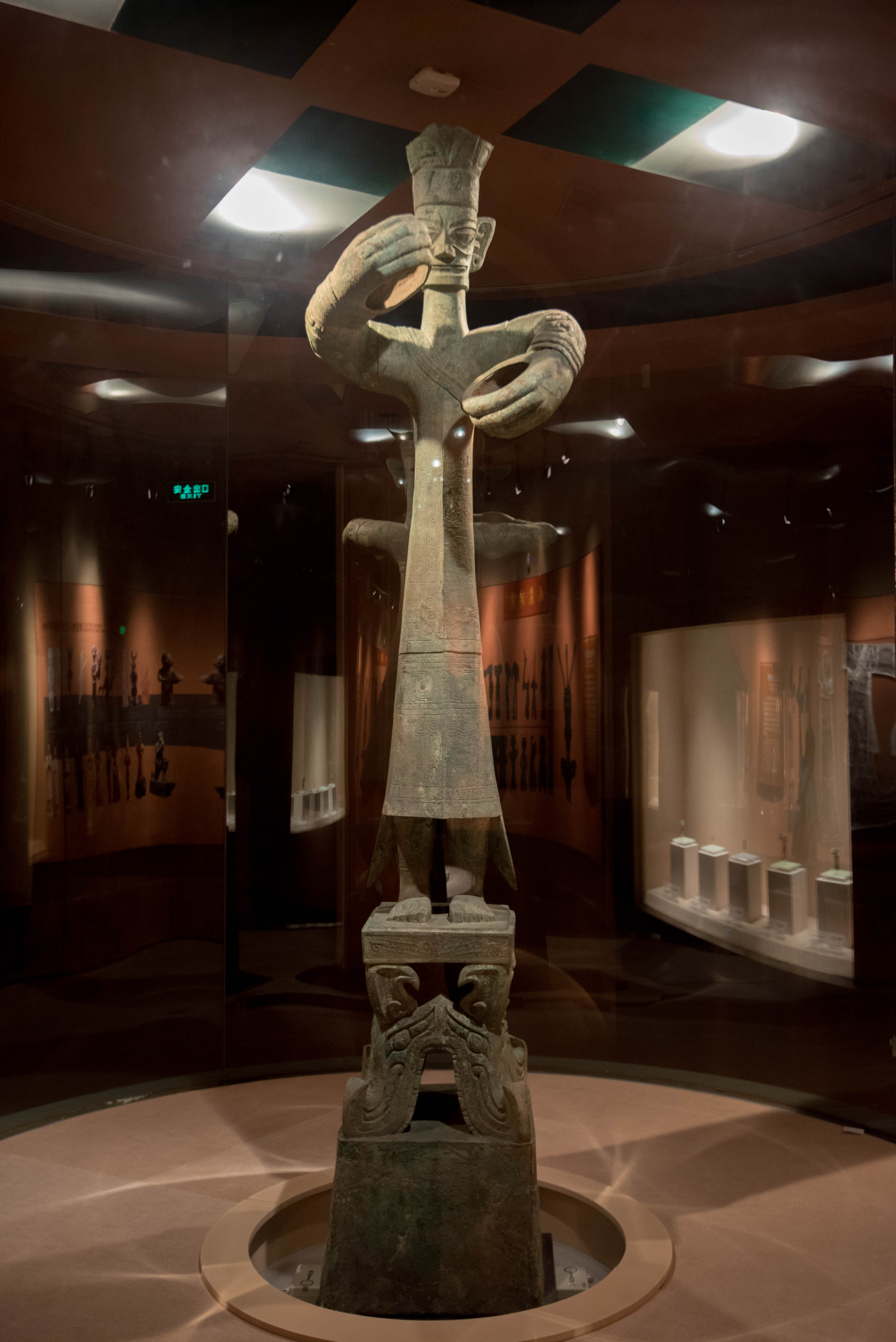
Bronze figure representing a high priest created by the inhabitants of Shu during the thirteenth or twelfth century BCE.

Before 316 BC, the Sichuan Basin was isolated from what was then a Bronze Age civilization that was centered in the Yellow River basin to the northeast. The discovery of Sanxingdui in 1987 was a major surprise since it indicated a major symbolic culture in Neolithic China that was previously unknown. Circa 2050–1250 BC the site of Sanxingdui 40 km north of Chengdu appears to have been the center of a fairly extensive kingdom. Objects found in two treasure pits are in a style distinct from objects found from further north. This culture is suggested by many archaeologists to be that of the Shu kingdom.

== Kingdom of Shu (10th century BC – 316 BC) ==
There are very few mentions of Shu in early Chinese historical records until the 4th century BE. Although there are possible references to a "Shu" in Shang dynasty oracle bones inscriptions that indicate contact between Shu and Shang, it is not clear if the Shu mentioned refer to the kingdom in Sichuan or other different polities elsewhere. Shu was first mentioned in Shujing as one of the allies of King Wu of Zhou who helped defeat the Shang in 1046 BC at the Battle of Muye. However, shortly after Zhou's conquest, it was mentioned in Yizhoushu that a subordinate of King Wu led an expedition against Shu. After the battle of Muye, northern influences on Shu seem to have increased and then decreased while the Shu remained culturally distinct; archaeology suggests contacts with Shu in the late Shang and early Zhou period, but little evidence of influence from later Zhou. The expulsion of the Zhou from the Wei River valley in 771 BC probably increased Shu's isolation.

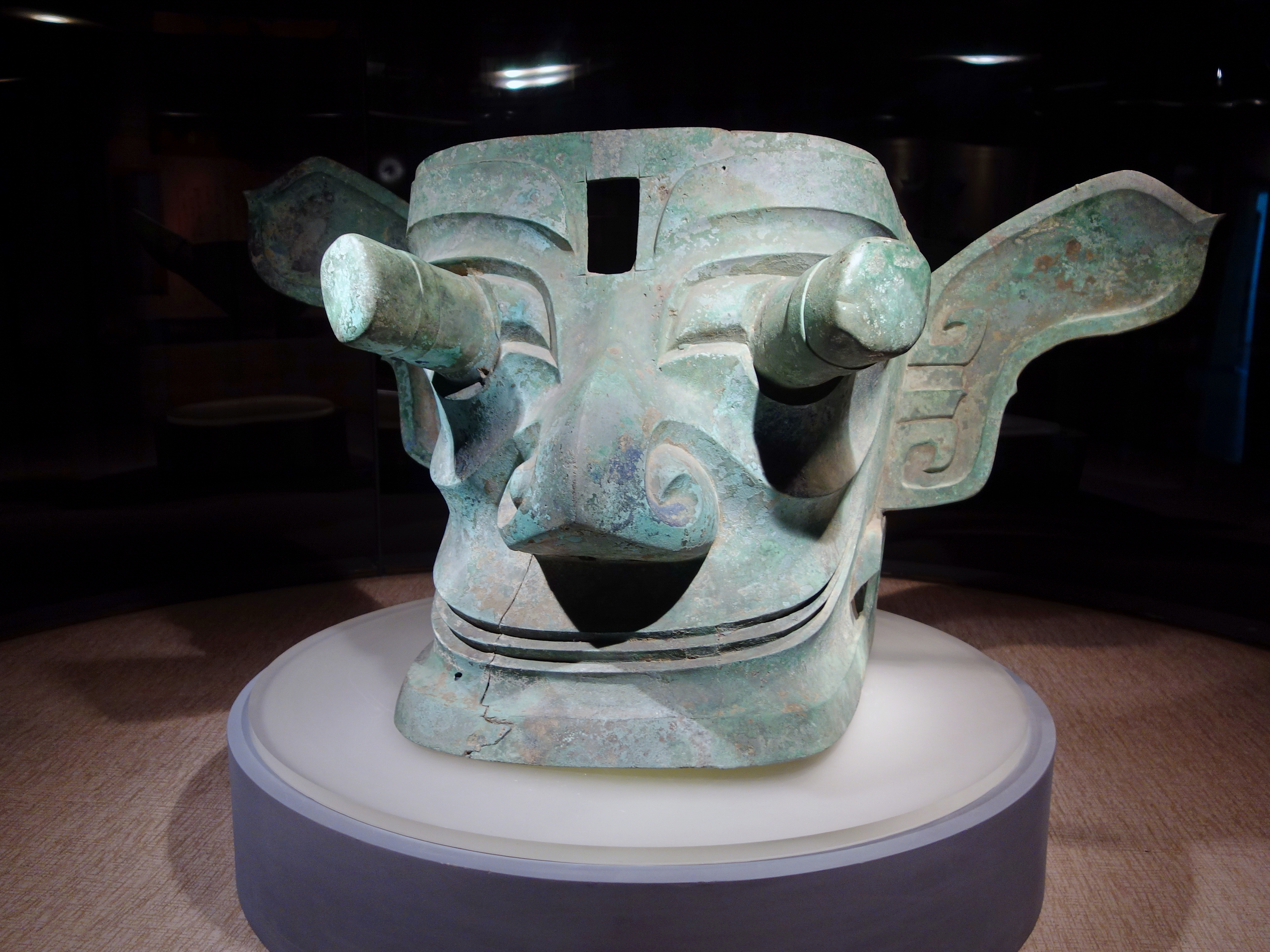
A large bronze head with protruding eyes believed to be a depiction of Cancong, the semi-legendary first king of Shu

Written accounts of Shu are largely a mixture of mythological stories and historical legends found in local annals and miscellaneous notes, which include the Han dynasty compilation Chronicle of the Kings of Shu and the Jin dynasty Chronicles of Huayang. There are a few names of semi-legendary kings and emperors, such as Cancong (meaning "silkworm-bush"), Boguan ("cypress-irrigator"), Yufu ("cormorant"), and Duyu ("cuckoo"). According to Chronicles of Huayang, Cancong was the first of the legendary kings and had protruding eyes, while Duyu taught the people agriculture and transformed into a cuckoo after his death.

In 666 BC a man from Chu called Bieling ("turtle spirit") founded the Kaiming dynasty which lasted twelve generations until the Qin conquest. Legend has it that Bieling had died in Chu and his body floated upriver to Shu, whereupon he came back to life. While at Shu, he was successful in managing a flood and Duyu then abdicated in his favor. A later account states that the Kaiming kings occupied the far south of Shu before travelling up the Min River and taking over from Duyu.

=== Ba–Shu culture ===
As the state of Chu expanded westward up the Han and Yangtze valleys it pushed the Ba peoples west toward Shu. In the 5th and 4th centuries BC in Sichuan archaeologists hold that this interaction helped create Ba–Shu culture. There was also some Chu influence on the Shu state. In 474 BC emissaries from the Shu state presented gifts to the Qin state which was the first recorded contact between these two states. Later Shu troops crossed the Qinling Mountains and approached the Qin capital of Yong, and in 387 Shu and Qin troops clashed near Hanzhong on the upper Han river.

== Shu under Qin and Han ==
=== Conquest by Qin in 316 BC ===
Sichuan Basin before the Qin conquest, 5th century BC

About 356–338 BC Shang Yang strengthened the Qin state by centralizing it. In 337 BC Shu emissaries congratulated King Huiwen of Qin on his accession. At about this time the Stone Cattle Road was built over the mountains to connect Qin and Shu. About 316 BC the Marquis of Zu, who held part of the Stone Cattle Road, became involved with Ba and quarreled with his brother, the twelfth Kaiming King. The Marquis was defeated and fled to Ba and then to Qin. Zhang Yi proposed that Qin should ignore these barbarians and continue its eastward expansion onto the central plain. Sima Cuo proposed that Qin should use its superior army to annex Shu, develop its resources and use the added strength for a later attack eastward. Sima Cuo's proposal was accepted and both advisors were sent south as generals. The two armies met near Jaimeng on the Jialing River in Ba territory. The Kaiming king lost several battles and withdrew southward to Wuyang where he was captured and killed. Qin then turned on its allies and annexed Ba.

=== Qin and Han rule ===
In 314 BC the late Kaiming king's son was appointed Marquis Yaotong of Shu to rule in conjunction with a Qin governor. In 311 BC an official named Chen Zhuang revolted and killed Yaotong. Sima Cuo and Zhang Yi again invaded Sichuan and killed Chen Zhuang. Another Kaiming called Hui was made Marquis. In 301 BC he was involved in an intrigue and chose suicide when confronted with Sima Cuo's army. His son, Wan, the last Kaiming marquis, reigned from 300 until 285 BC when he was put to death. (Some say that An Dương Vương in Vietnamese history was a member of the Kaiming family who led his people southward.)

The conquest had more than doubled Qin's territory and gave it an area safe from the other states except Chu, but the land had to be developed before its taxes could be converted into military strength. Shu was made a "jun" or commandery and became a testing ground for this type of administration. Chengdu was surrounded by an enormous wall. Land was redistributed and divided into rectangular plots. Tens of thousands of colonists were brought in from the north. Many were convicts or people displaced by the wars further north. They were marched south in columns supervised by Qin officials. The great Dujiangyan Irrigation System was begun to divert the Min River east to the Chengdu Plain. Qin intervention in Ba was less extensive, apparently to avoid alienating a warlike people on the border of Chu.

During the conquest Chu was still tied up in the east with the annexation of Yue. In 312 BC Qin and Chu troops clashed on the upper Han River. Zhang Yi used a mixture of threat and bluff to block any interference from Chu. Later a Chu general named Zhuang Qiao pushed west and occupied the tribal territory south of the Yangtze south of Shu. In 281 BC Sima Cuo crossed the Yangtze and cut him off from Chu. He responded by declaring himself an independent king and he and his troops gradually blended into the local population. Starting in 280 BC or before general Bai Qi pushed down the Han River and took the Chu capital (278 BC). In 277 BC the Three Gorges area was taken. The effect was to create a new Qin frontier east of Sichuan.

Sichuan remained quiescent during the wars before and after the Qin dynasty indicating the Qin policy of assimilation had been successful. Archaeological remains in Shu from this period are very similar to those of northern China, while the Ba area remained somewhat distinct. When Liu Bang launched his campaign to found the Han dynasty Sichuan was an important supply base. In 135 BC, under the expansionist Emperor Wu of Han, general Tang Meng, attempting an indirect approach to the Kingdom of Nanyue, made a push south of the Yangtze River and a little later Sima Xiangru pushed into the hill country west of Sichuan. These campaigns into tribal territory proved more expensive than they were worth and in 126 BC they were both cancelled to shift resources to the Xiongnu wars in the north. In the same year Zhang Qian returned from the west and reported that it might be possible to reach India from Sichuan. An attempt to do this was blocked by the hill tribes. In 112 BC Tang Meng resumed his expansionist wars southwards. His harsh methods provoked a near mutiny in Sichuan and Sima Xiangru was brought in to implement a more moderate policy. By this time Chinese expansion across flat agricultural country had reached a natural geographical limit. Expansion into the hill country to the south and west was much slower.

== Shu in astronomy ==
Shu is represented by star Alpha Serpentis in asterism Right Wall, Heavenly Market enclosure (see Chinese constellation), together with Lambda Serpentis in R.H. Allen's works.

== See also ==
- Clothing in ancient Shu
- Jinsha site
- Sanxingdui
- Sichuan embroidery
- Shu Han
- Former Shu
- Later Shu
- Joint tombs of boat-shaped coffins
