= Shu =

Shu may refer to:

== China ==
- Sichuan, China, officially abbreviated as Shu (蜀)
- Shu (kingdom) (conquered by Qin in 316 BC), an ancient kingdom in modern Sichuan
- Shu Han (221–263) during the Three Kingdoms period
- Cheng-Han (成汉/成漢), also named Later Shu (后蜀/後蜀), one of the Sixteen Kingdoms
- Western Shu (405–413), also known as Qiao Shu, a state founded by Qiao Zong during the Eastern Jin dynasty
- Former Shu (907–925) during the Five Dynasties and Ten Kingdoms period
- Later Shu (934–965) during the Five Dynasties and Ten Kingdoms period
- Shu River, in Shandong Province
- The Book of Documents (Shū 書)

== People ==
- Shu, the guitarist in the Japanese rock band, BACK-ON
- Shu (surname), Chinese surname 舒
- Frank Shu (1943–2023), Chinese-American professor of astronomy
- Quan-Sheng Shu, American physicist
- Shu Abe (阿部 嵩; born 1984), Japanese footballer
- Will Shu (born 1979), American businessman, the co-founder and CEO of Deliveroo

== Astronomy ==
- Shu - a bright-ray crater on Ganymede, the largest moon of Jupiter.

== Fictional characters ==
- Shu, in the Xbox 360 game Blue Dragon
- Shu, in the Dragon Ball franchise
- Shu (Suikoden), in the video game Suikoden II
- Shu Shirakawa, in the Super Robot Wars video game series
- Shū, in the Fist of the North Star manga and anime franchise
- Shu, in the manga series Hikaru no Go
- Shu Kurenai, in the manga and toyline Beyblade Burst
- Shuzo "Shu" Matsutani, in the anime series Now and Then, Here and There and Legendz
- Shu Ouma, in the anime and manga series Guilty Crown
- Shū or Drew (Pokémon), in the Pokémon series
- Shu Murakami, in the 2017 film Life
- Shū Tsukiyama, in the series Tokyo Ghoul
- Shu Todoroki, in the film Cars 2
- Shu Sakamaki (逆巻 シュウ), in the visual novel and anime Diabolik Lovers
- Shu Amiguchi, in the video game 13 Sentinels: Aegis Rim
- Shu Itsuki, a character from the franchise Ensemble Stars!

== Mythology ==
- Shu (god) - the god of the air and wind in Egyptian mythology.

== Acronyms ==
SHU may be an acronym for:

- Finnish Elite Athletes' Union, a trade union in Finland
- Scoville Heat Unit, a measurement of hotness or spiciness in food
- Security Housing Unit, a solitary confinement space in a maximum security prison
- Special Handling Unit, a super maximum security prison located in Sainte-Anne-des-Plaines, Quebec
- Scottish Hockey Union, governs field hockey in Scotland

=== Universities ===
- Sacred Heart University, Fairfield, Connecticut, US
- Seton Hall University, South Orange, New Jersey, US
- Seton Hill University, Greensburg, Pennsylvania, US
- Shanghai University, China
- Sheffield Hallam University, England
- Shih Hsin University, Taipei, Taiwan

== Other uses ==
- Shu, the Kazakh name for the Chu (river) in Kyrgyzstan and Kazakhstan
- Shu, Kazakhstan (disambiguation)
- Shu (gold coin) (朱), a unit of Japanese Tokugawa coinage used in the Nishuban and Isshuban

== See also ==
- Shoo (disambiguation)
