= Green cleaning =

Type of cleaning methods and products

Green cleaning refers to using cleaning methods and products with environmentally friendly ingredients and procedures which are designed to preserve human health and environmental quality. Green cleaning techniques and products avoid the use of products which contain toxic chemicals, some of which emit volatile organic compounds causing respiratory, dermatological and other conditions. Green cleaning can also describe the way residential and industrial cleaning products are manufactured, packaged and distributed. If the manufacturing process is environmentally friendly and the products are biodegradable, then the term "green" or "eco-friendly" may apply.

== Product labeling programs ==
Among the product-labeling programs is the United States Environmental Protection Agency's (EPA) Design for the Environment program which labels products that meet the EPA's criteria for chemicals. These products are allowed to carry the Design for the Environment (DfE) label, renamed EPA Safer Choice in 2015. Generally, products which are labelled 'low' or 'zero' VOC are safer for human and animal health in the home as well as the environment. In addition, the EPA's Toxic Substances Control Act addresses chemicals in the environment and makes regulatory rules to maximize human health. There are also independent product labeling programs for cleaning products and cleaning services offered by nonprofit organizations like Green Seal.

On October 15, 2017, California Governor Jerry Brown signed into law Senate Bill 258, the Cleaning Product Right to Know Act. The bill was brought to the floor by Senator Ricardo Lara and supported by some of the oldest green cleaning manufacturers, such as Kelly Vlahakis-Hanks of Earth Friendly Products and board member of the American Sustainable Business Council, as well as mainstream companies who are entering into the green cleaning space such as SC Johnson who recently purchased Mrs. Meyers and Method. The Cleaning Product Right to Know Act makes California the first state to require ingredient labeling both on product labels and online for cleaning products. Unlike retail packaged food, no federal requirements exist for disclosing ingredients on cleaning products. The Cleaning Product Right to Know Act will require known hazardous chemicals in cleaning products to be listed on both product labels and online by 2020. The legislation lists 34 chemicals found in cleaning products that have been shown to cause cancer, birth defects, asthma and other serious health effects:

1. 1,4-Dioxane
2. 1,1-Dichloroethane
3. Acrylic acid
4. Benzene
5. Benzidine
6. 1,3-Butadiene
7. Carbon tetrachloride
8. Chloroform
9. Ethylene oxide
10. Nitrilotriacetic acid
11. Butyl benzyl phthalate
12. Butyl decyl phthalate
13. Di(2-ethylhexyl) phthalate
14. Diethyl phthalate
15. Diisobutyl phthalate
16. Di(n-octyl) phthalate
17. Diisononyl phthalate
18. Dioctyl phthalate
19. Butylparaben
20. Ethylparaben
21. Isobutylparaben
22. Methylparaben
23. Propylparaben
24. Formaldehyde
25. DMDM hydantoin
26. Diazolidinyl urea
27. Glyoxal
28. Imidazolidinyl urea
29. Polyoxymethylene urea
30. Sodium hydroxymethylglycinate
31. 2-Bromo-2-nitropropane-1,3-diol
32. N-Nitrosodimethylamine
33. N-Nitrosodiethylamine
34. 1-(3-chloroallyl)-3,5,7-triaza-1-azoniaadamantane chloride

In the announcement made by the California State Senate said the bill was in "response to consumers' demand for transparency."

== See also ==
- Green Seal
- Cleaning agent
- Environmental impact of cleaning agents
- Design for the Environment
- United States Environmental Protection Agency
- Greenwashing
