= Jinsha site =

Archaeological site in Chengdu, China

Jinsha Site (金沙)
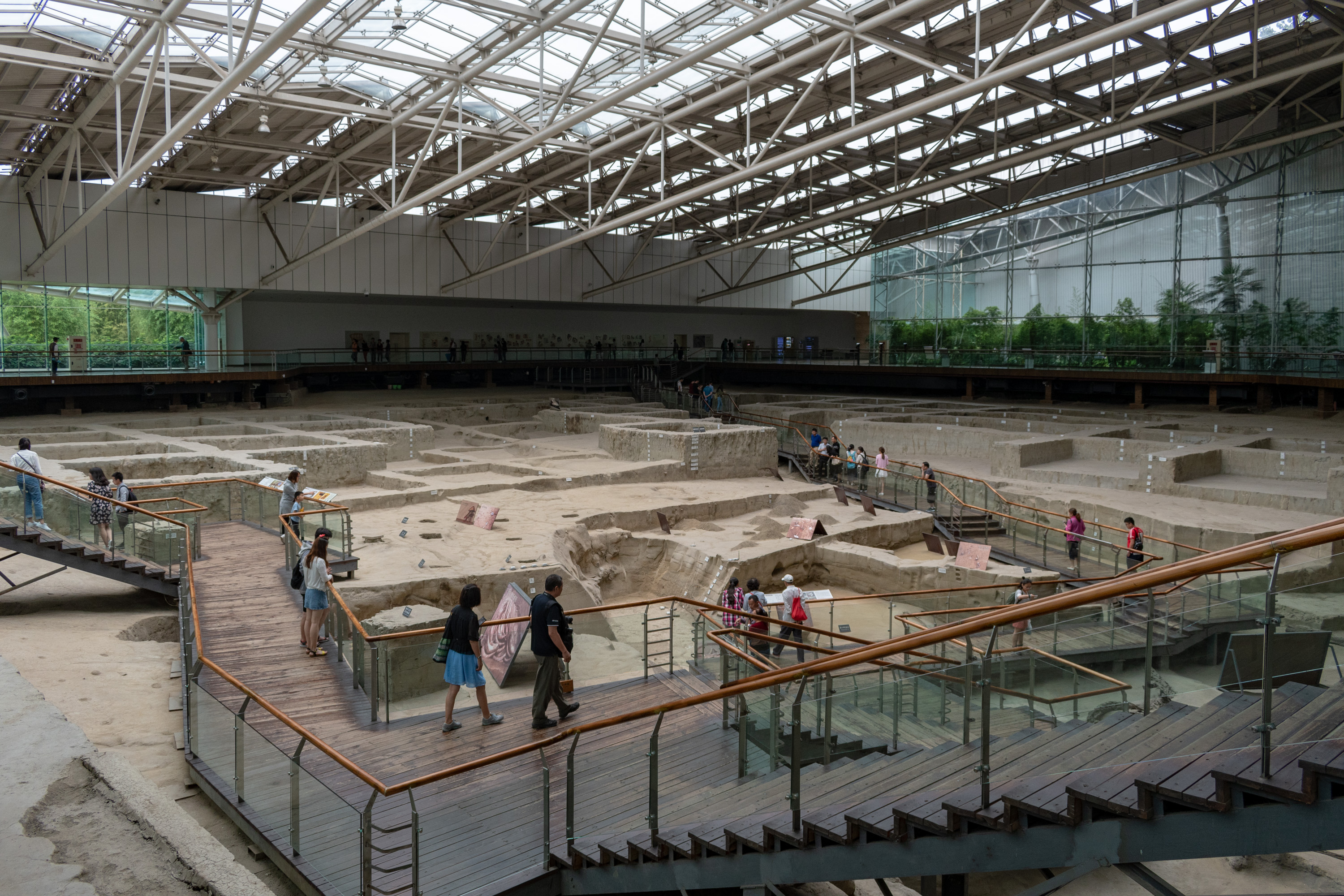
- Interactive map of Jinsha Site (金沙)
- 30.681183°N 104.012602°E
- Periods: Shang dynasty and/or Western Zhou dynasty
- Cultures: Shi'erqiao (1200–800 BC)
- Location: China
- Region: Sichuan

Site notes
- Area: 3 square kilometres (1.2 sq mi)
- Discovered: 8 February 2001
- Website: jinshasitemuseum.com

Jinsha (Chinese: 金沙; pinyin: Jīnshā) is a Chinese archaeological site located in Qingyang, Chengdu, the capital of the Chinese province of Sichuan. The site is one of the major archaeological discoveries in China during the 21st century. It is listed on the UNESCO World Cultural Heritage Tentative List and Major Sites Protected at the National Level. The Chinese Internet Information Centre ranked Jinsha 5th on the Top 10 Archaeological Discoveries in 2001.

In 2007, the Jinsha Museum was constructed to display the artefacts and features found. This includes the gold sunbird, smiling gold mask and the kneeling stone figures. The gold sunbird artefact is a national symbol of China according to the State Administration of Cultural Heritage. Jinsha is organised into different archaeological localities such as Mei Yuan, Lan Yuan and Tiyu Gongyuan.

After the decline of Sanxingdui, Jinsha emerged as the capital of the Shu state in the Shang or Western Zhou dynasty. It disappeared between 500 BCE and 200 BCE due to political revolution, earthquakes and/or flooding.

In 2013, History Channel Asia produced a one-hour English language documentary called The Lost City at Jinsha. It was co-produced with China International Communication Centre (CICC). Dr Agnes Hsu, a Chinese American archaeologist, hosted the episode. The episode is part of the documentary series called 'Mysteries of China'.

== Discovery ==
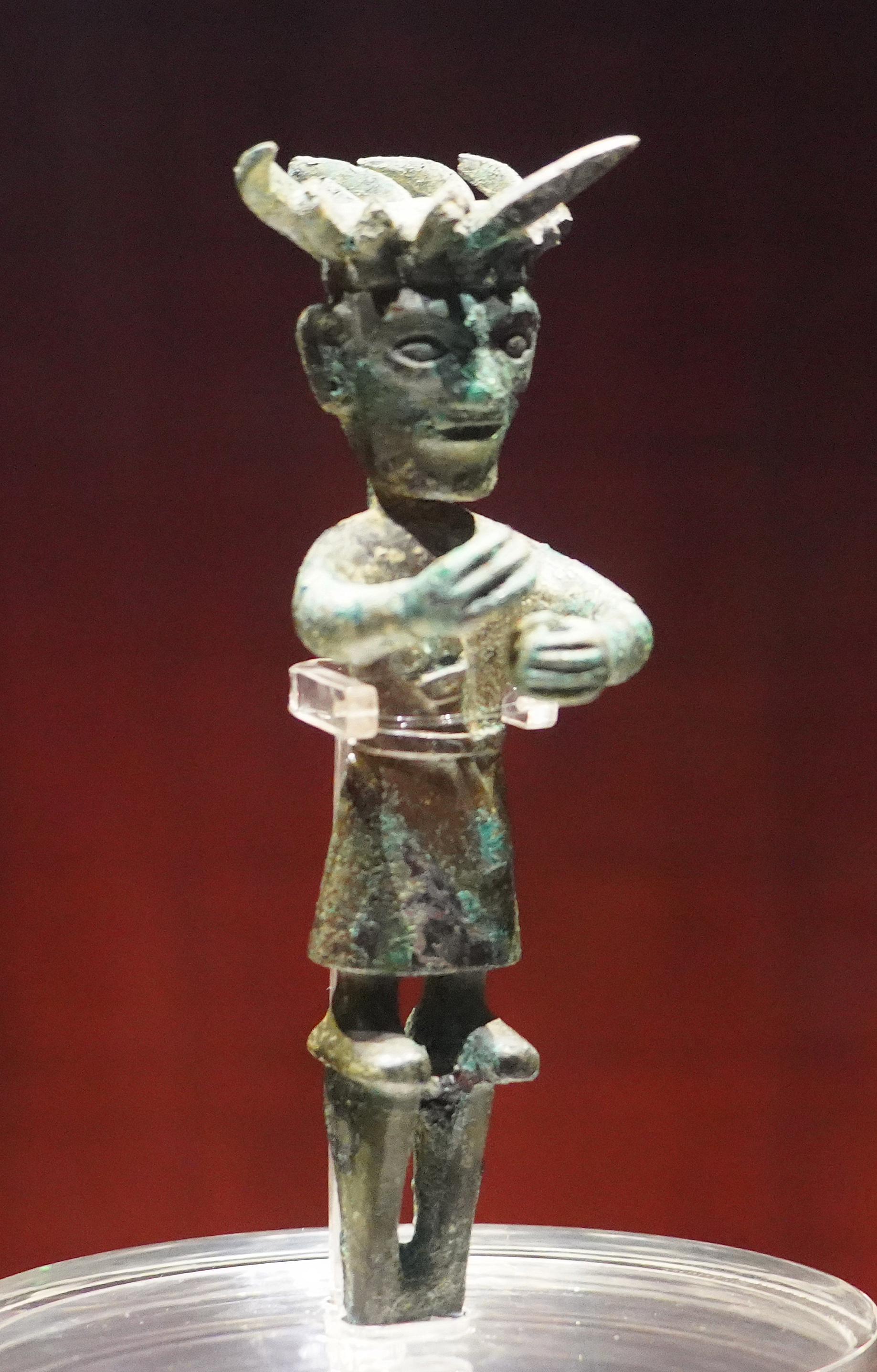
Jinsha figurine

The site was accidentally discovered on 8 February 2001. When the China Real Estate Development Group was constructing the Shufeng Huayuancheng (蜀風花園城) 5 kilometers from the centre of Chengdu, a drain was discovered. The drain contained artefacts made of bronze, jade, stone and ivory. The Chengdu Municipal Institute of Cultural Relics and Archaeology immediately dispatched a team to investigate and secure the area. On 9 February, excavations around the initial drain began.

The term 'Jinsha site' was coined after the 2001 discovery. It refers to smaller investigation projects done since 1995 that occupied 3 square kilometres. Before 2001, the Chengdu Municipal Institute of Cultural Relics and Archaeology had conducted field surveys and excavations in Huangzhongcun (黃忠村). Specifically, this occurred in Locus Sanhe Huayuan (三合花園) and Locus Jindu Huayuan (金都花園) between 1995 and 2000. It is recognised that these archaeological localities are remnants of a large-scale civilisation in the late Shang and early Western Zhou periods.

The number of features and artifacts found at Jinsha
Archaeological finding	Number found
Buildings	50
Kilns	30
Burials	300
Ash pits	1,000
Gold artifacts	40
Bronze artifacts	700
Jade artifacts	900
Stone artifacts	300
Pottery	10,000
Ivory and bone artifacts	40

== Site information ==
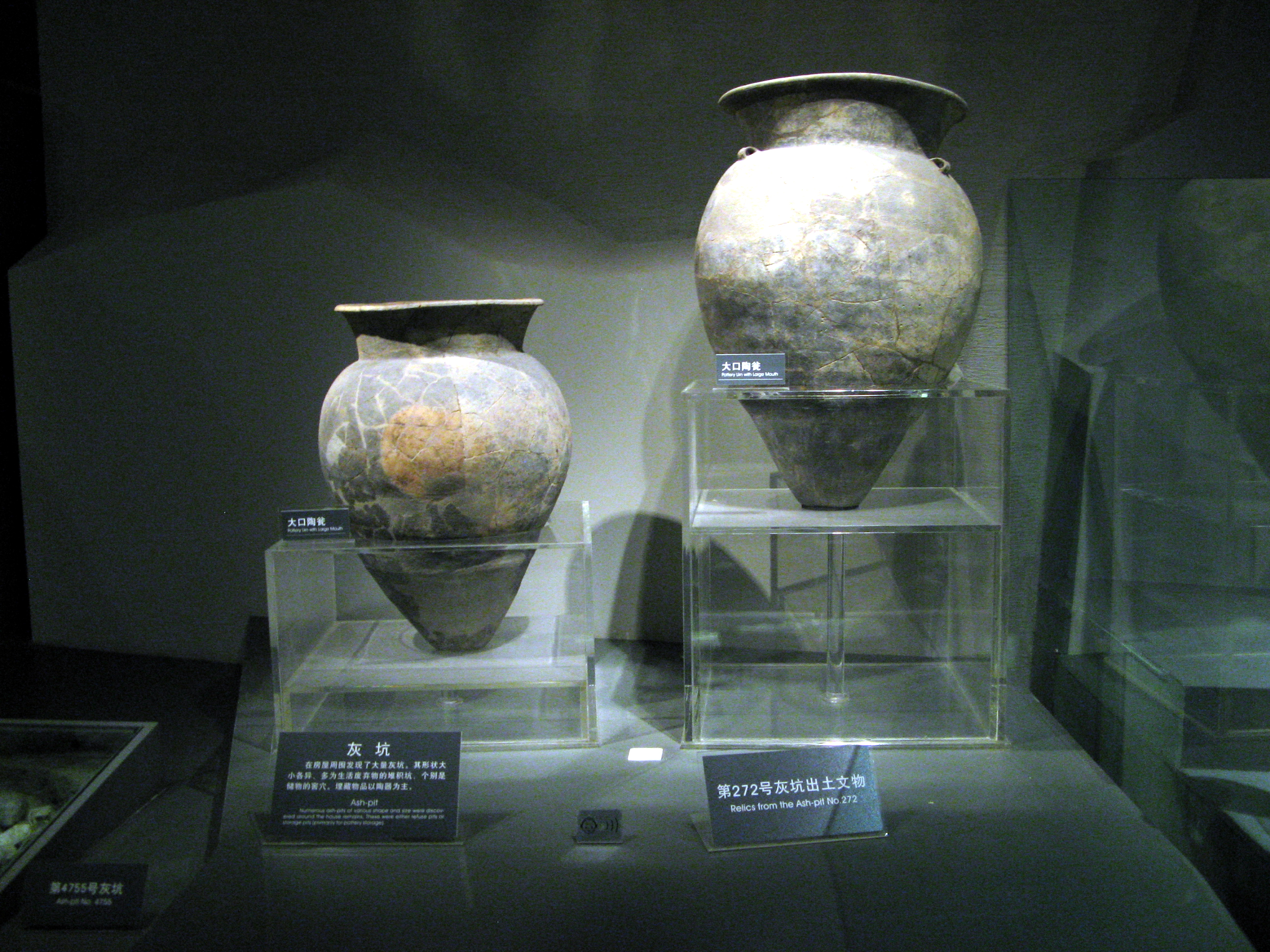
Jars with small bases displayed at Jinsha Museum

Jinsha is located in the East region of the Chengdu Plains. During the Bronze Age, the fluctuating environment and demands for resources caused people to change settlements. Due to its proximity and similarities in features and artefacts, Jinsha is compared to Sanxingdui. Unlike Sanxingdui, Jinsha contained no city walls or moats. Jinsha is bounded by Shuhan (蜀漢), Qinyang (青羊), Sanhuan (三環) and Qinjiang Roads (青江). The Modi River divides the site into the north and south side. The site is mainly even with little fluctuations, ranging up to 5 metres.

=== Dating and cultural classification ===
Pottery found in Huangzhongcun dates the Jinsha settlement to the late Shang and Western Zhou dynasties. Simple jars with small bases and pointed-bottom saucers were the most common pottery found. This undecorated and plain design is distinct to the Shi'erqiao culture in this period. Other pottery found includes the pointed-bottom cups and tall-beaked vessel lids. In view of the scale and complexity of the site, Jinsha is thought to have emerged as the capital after the decline of Sanxingdui.

== Organisation of the site by localities ==
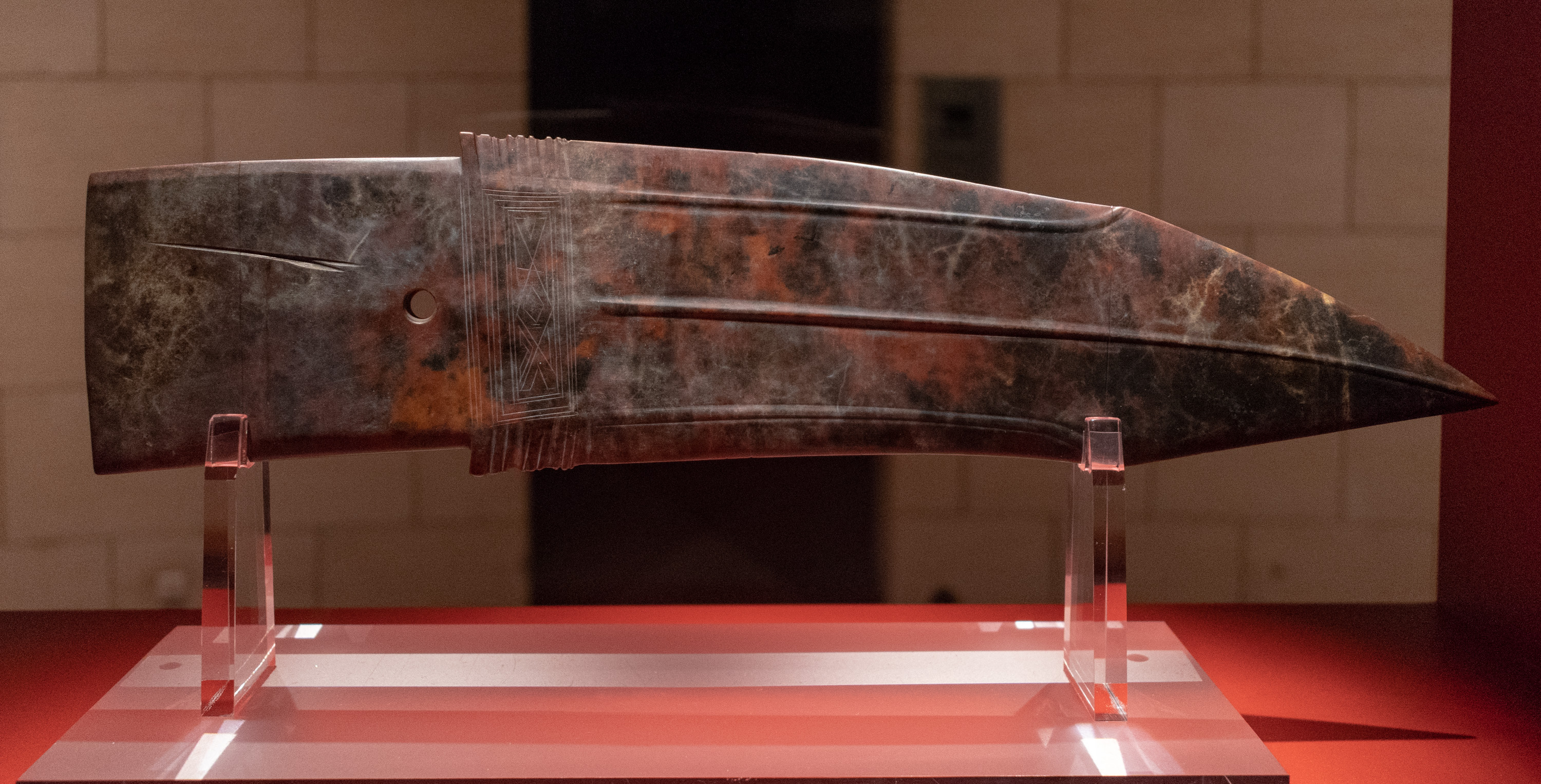
Jade Dagger-axe (Le. 42.6 Wi. 10.43 Dp. 0.9cm)

The site is divided into different localities. These have been identified to possess unique community functions. Mei Yuan, Lan Yuan and Tiyu Gongyuan are the main archaeological localities.

=== Locus Mei Yuan ===
Cultural artefacts made of gold, bronze, jade, stone, ivory and bone were discovered at Locus Mei Yuan. Situated on the southern banks of the Modi River, the locality covers 22 hectares. Pits that contained Asian elephant tusks, stone weapons and tusks from boars, antlers and deer were found. This locality was an area where cultural, religious and social events occurred.

=== Locus Lan Yuan ===
Buildings, tombs, graves, kilns, refuse pits and cellar pits were found at Locus Lan Yuan. Buildings were found in the north, while burials were found in the south and west of the locality. Excavation here by the institute occurred between July 2001 and January 2002. It is situated next to Locus Mei Yuan and covers 15 hectares. Before it became a burial site, it was a residential area for the people living in Jinsha.

=== Locus Tiyu Gongyuan ===
Larger palace-like residential buildings and burial pits were found at Locus Tiyu Gongyuan. Excavation efforts were focused here between October and November 2001. It is next to Locus Lan Yuan and covers 9 hectares. Burial pits were the most densely populated here, with 15 burials found within 81 square metres. The locality was a residential area for the wealthier residents at Jinsha, before it became a place of burials.

== Artefacts ==
The golden sun bird, smiling golden mask and kneeling stone figures were found at the Jinsha site. With the artefacts being made of diverse materials, craft production was advanced and resourceful. The pottery, stone and bone artefacts were used as household or daily objects. Artefacts made of bronze, gold, ivory, jade or other precious stones were generally used for religious or decorative purposes.

=== Gold sun bird ===
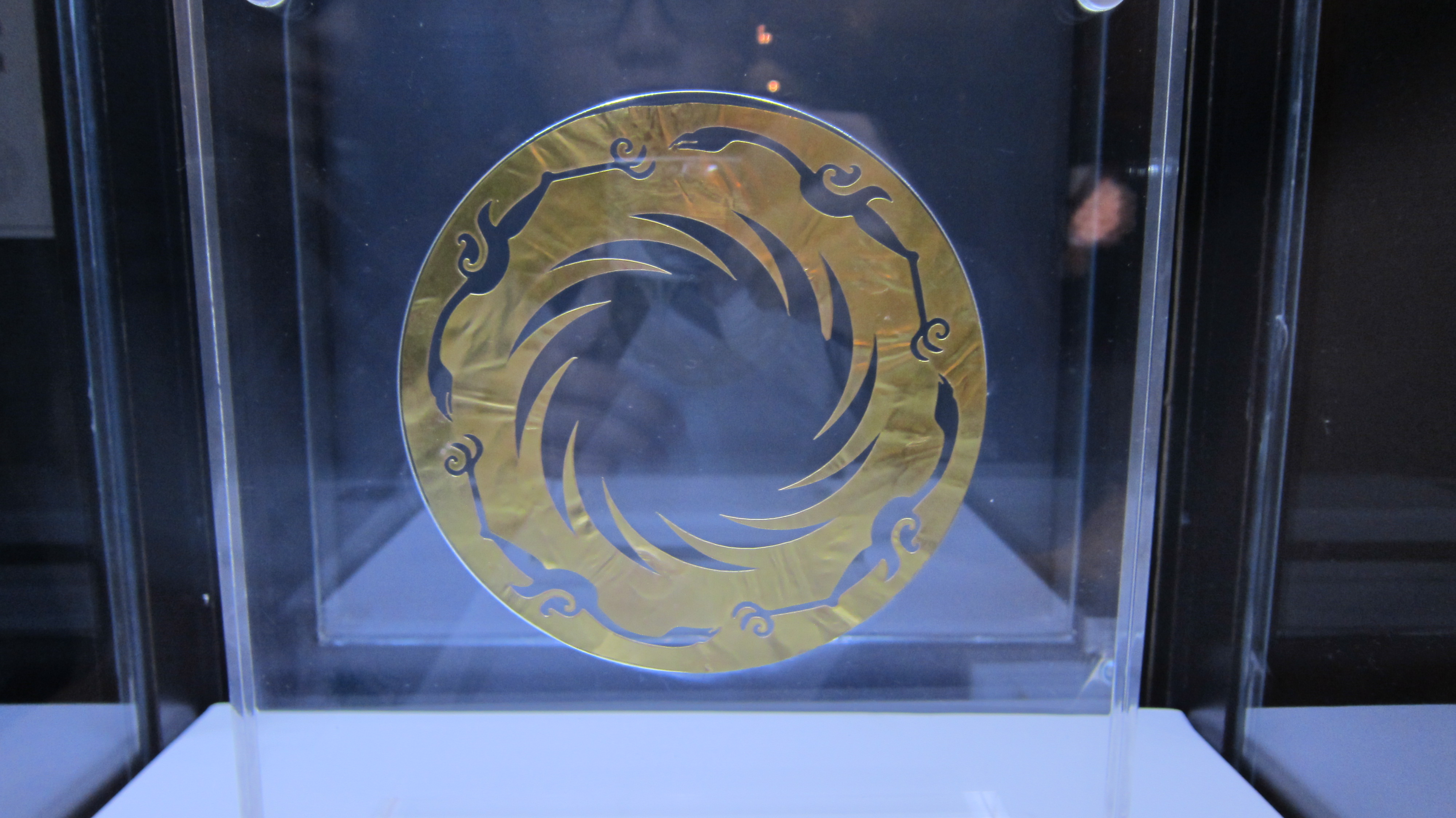
Golden sun bird displayed at Jinsha Museum

The gold artefact is circular with a 12-point sun in the middle. With a concentration of 94.2% gold, the gold leaf was made with natural gold dust. On the perimeters of the leaf, four birds flying towards the left have been carved out. In 2005, the State Administration of Cultural Heritage stated that the artefact symbolised Chinese history. It was believed to represent the legend in the Classic of Mountains and Seas. The legend explained that sunset occurred when four birds pulled it down from the sky. Due to its popularity, the artefact is the logo for the Jinsha Museum, which currently displays it on the second floor. Since people at Jinsha worshipped the sun, the gold sunbird is regarded to symbolise authority and power.

=== Kneeling stone human figures ===
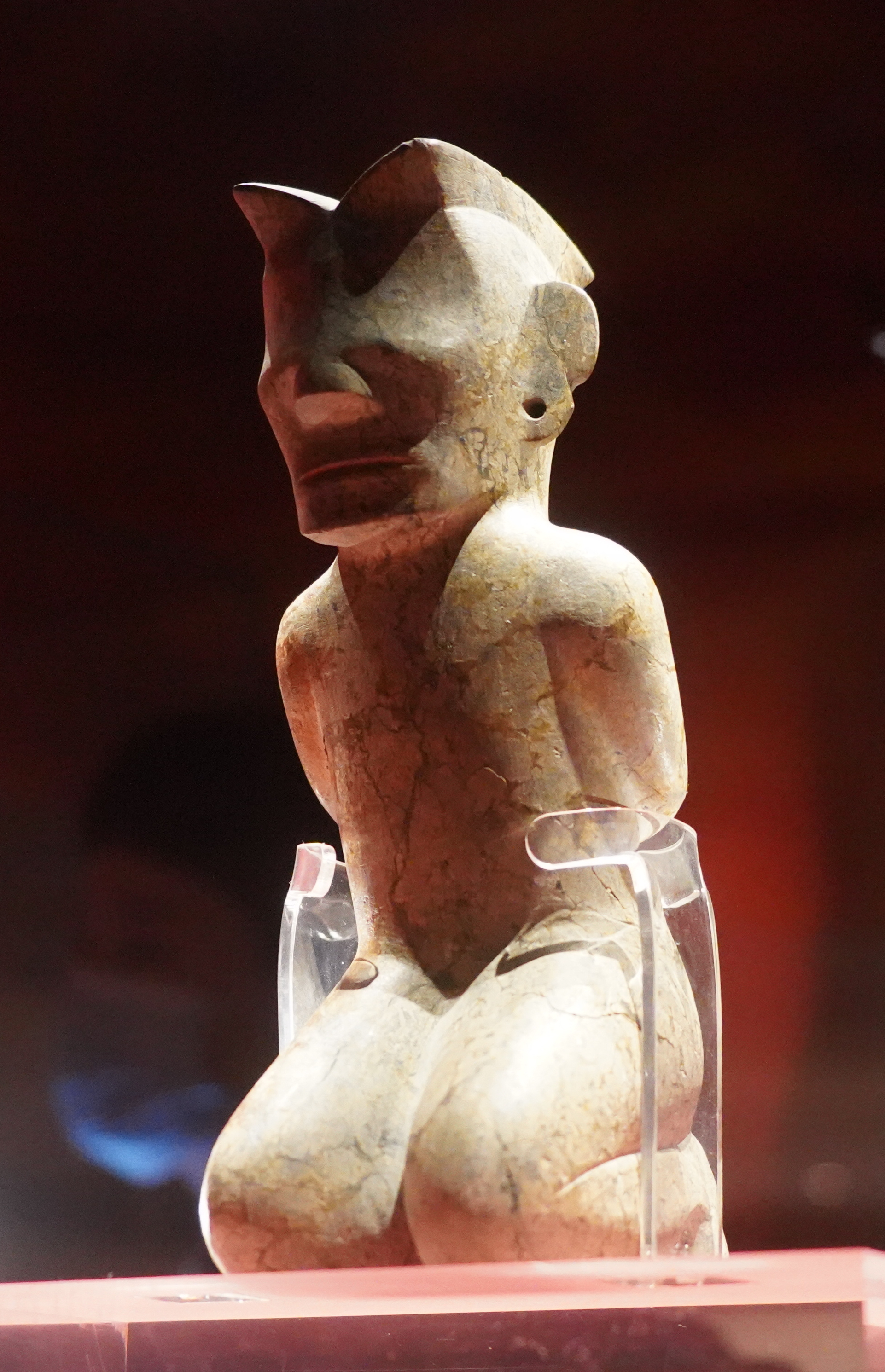
One of the twelve kneeling human figures found at Jinsha

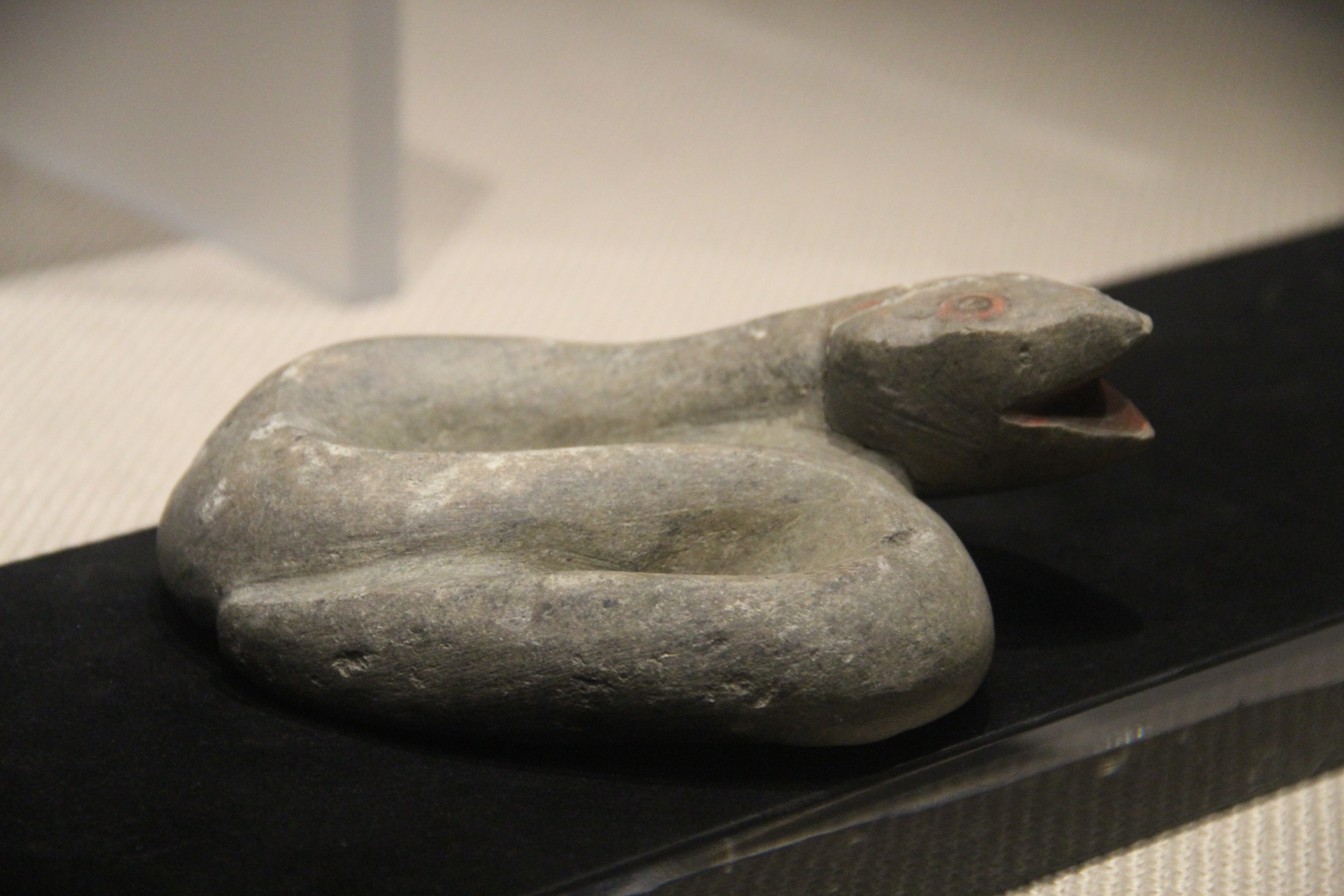
Stone snake found with the kneeling stone human figures

12 human figures made of stone were discovered. The figures are depicted kneeling, with their hands tied and their hair braided with a parting in the middle. The figure's faces are angular with high nose bridges, and their bodies are naked with no decoration or markings on them. Skilful stone craftsmanship is indicated through precise cutting, polishing, carving and hollowing. The figures most likely represent shamans, ritual performers, or human sacrifices to the higher beings, rather than slaves or prisoners of wars. Similar figures were found in Sanxingdui, where a short hairstyle mimics the identity of shamans and ritual specialists. Along with the human figures, ritual artefacts such as stone tigers, stone snakes, bronze and pottery were found. In ancient China, snakes were viewed as the intermediate species between deity and humans, while tigers were feared by the people. Those who commanded snakes and tigers were held as superior and special in status for conducting religious activities. Therefore, these were used in Locus Mei Yuan for rituals, sacrifices, ceremonies and religious feasts.

=== Smiling gold mask ===
The gold mask has crescent-shaped eyes and a half-opened mouth. The design makes it appear to be 'smiling'. It is 3.7 centimetres in height and 4.7 centimetres in width. This design has not been found anywhere else in China. Its thin mould was made by beating sheets of gold. The mask was used for religious worship and prayers when it was bonded onto figures. For the people at Jinsha, the mask was an avenue to connect with deities.

== Features ==
The discovered features found at Jinsha include residential buildings, burials, pits and pottery kilns. Based on this combination, Jinsha was a large urban centre.

=== A pit filled with elephant tusks ===
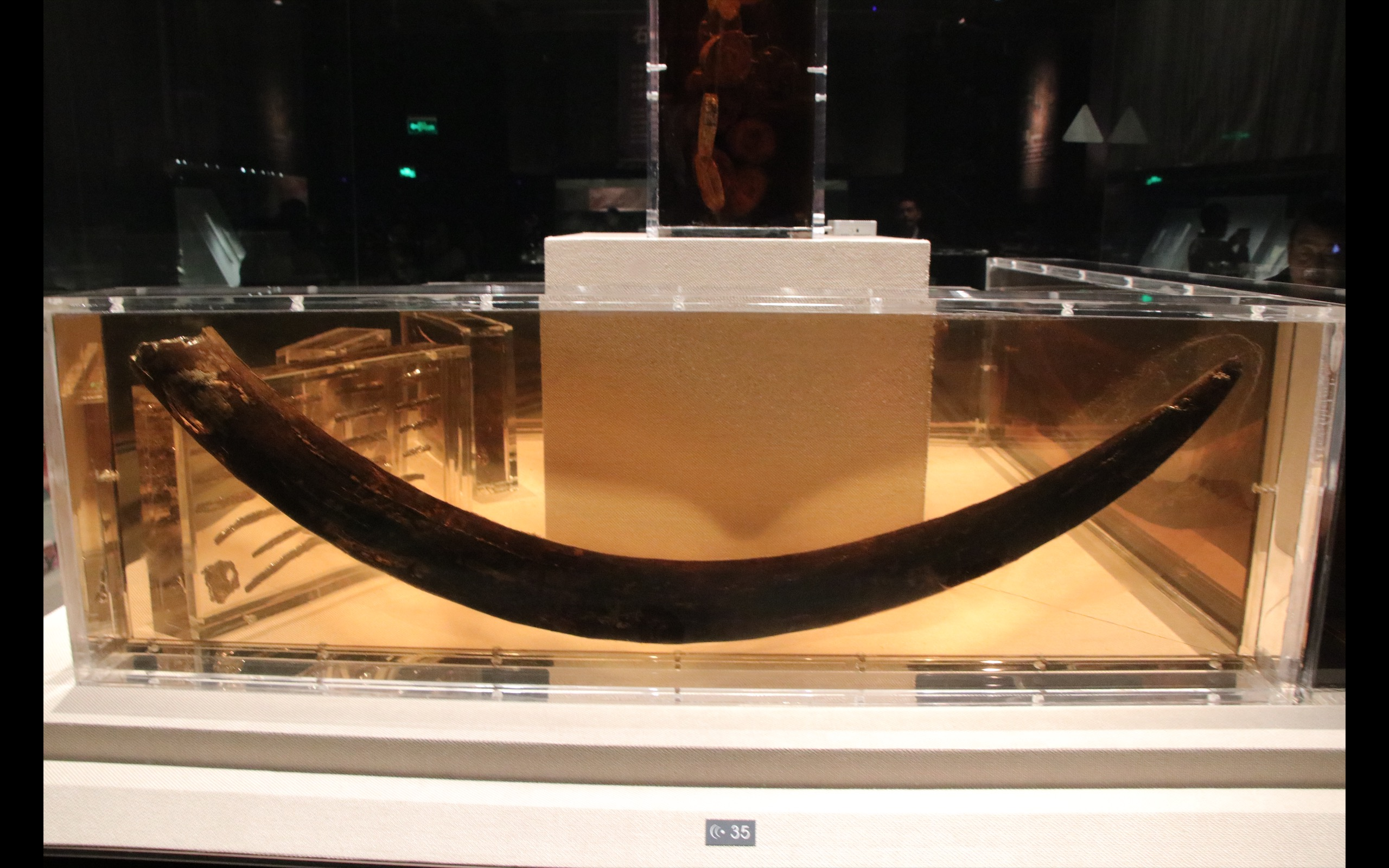
Elephant tusk found in the pit

At Locus Mei Yuan, Asian elephant tusks were found in the eastern corner. The pit was 160 centimetres in length and 60 centimetres in width. It was severely disturbed by construction equipment during excavations. There were two layers to the pit. The top layer was filled with dirt, while the bottom layer was sand filled with elephant tusks. The longest tusk was 150 centimeters long. These were evenly placed in 8 layers. Within this rounded pit, bronze and jade artefacts were found.

=== Buildings ===
All 50 buildings found faced north-west or south-west. For smaller buildings, the floors were filled with small post-holes only. For large buildings, large post-holes (spaced 1 meter apart) were added. The walls were made using the wattle and daub method. It was constructed with mud on the inside and supported by wood or bamboo on the outside.

=== Kilns ===
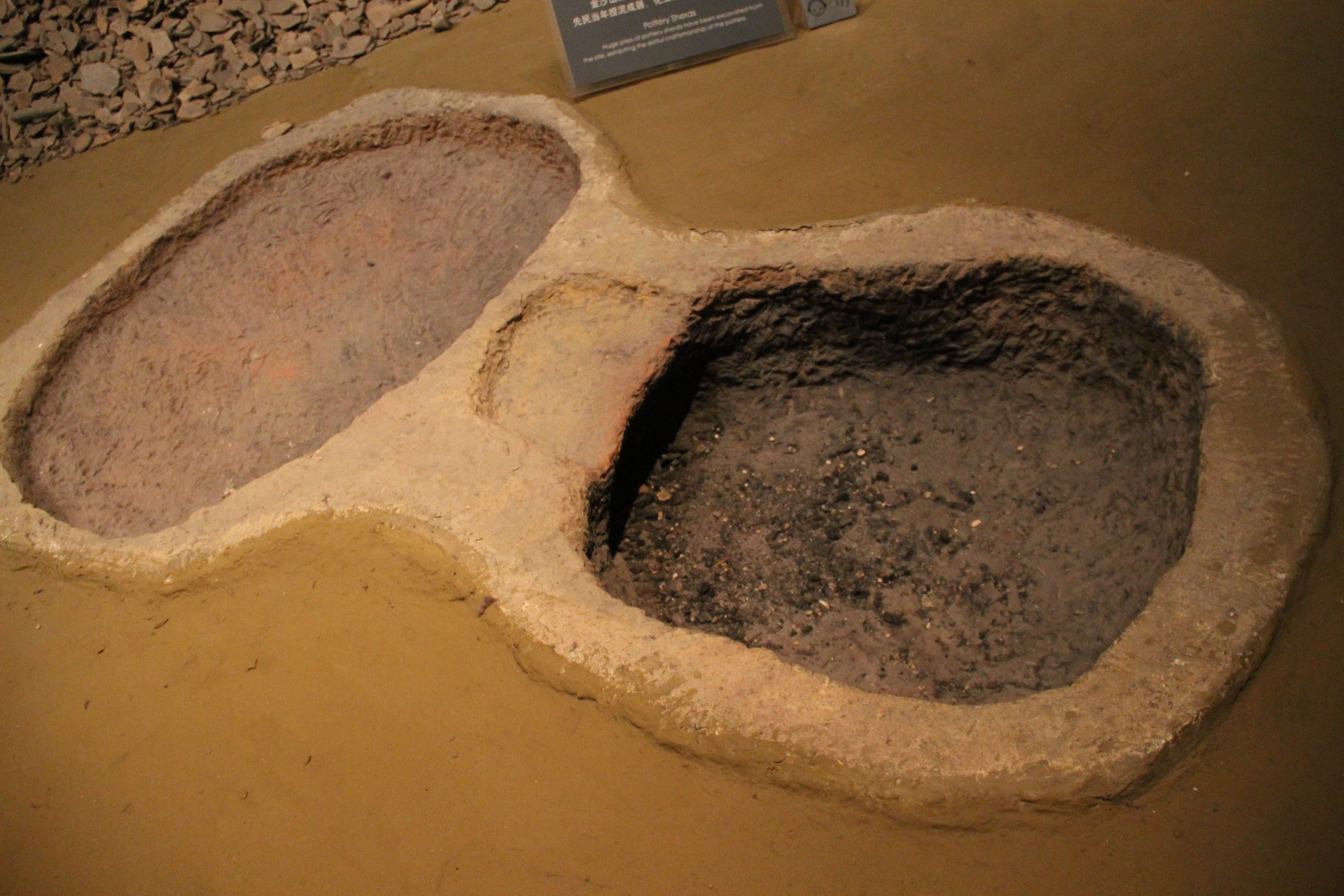
Pottery kiln

200 pottery kilns have been discovered near burial pits in Lan Yuan, Sanhe Huayuan and Jindu Huayuan. People used pottery for ordinary and religious activities. Each kiln had 4 components: a surface, fire chamber, kiln door and kiln chamber. It was oval with an area of 4 square metres. Pottery production was prominent at Jinsha as kilns were also discovered in buildings. The concentration of kilns in certain areas reflects the proximity between crafters. This allowed uniformity in pottery production.

=== Burial pits and tombs ===
At Locus Lan Yuan and Locus Tiyu Gongyuan, 300 burial pits were found. They mostly faced south-west, but some faced north-west. Skeletons were found to be lying upwards with their hands covering the chest. Contrary to the burials found in Sanxingdui, half only contained the body. The other half had burial goods but were limited to pottery. Only in five burials were jade and bronze artefacts also found. Burial chambers were found to include either single bodies or bodies of couples. The layout of burials did not indicate a social hierarchy in the Jinsha civilisation.

== Conservation ==
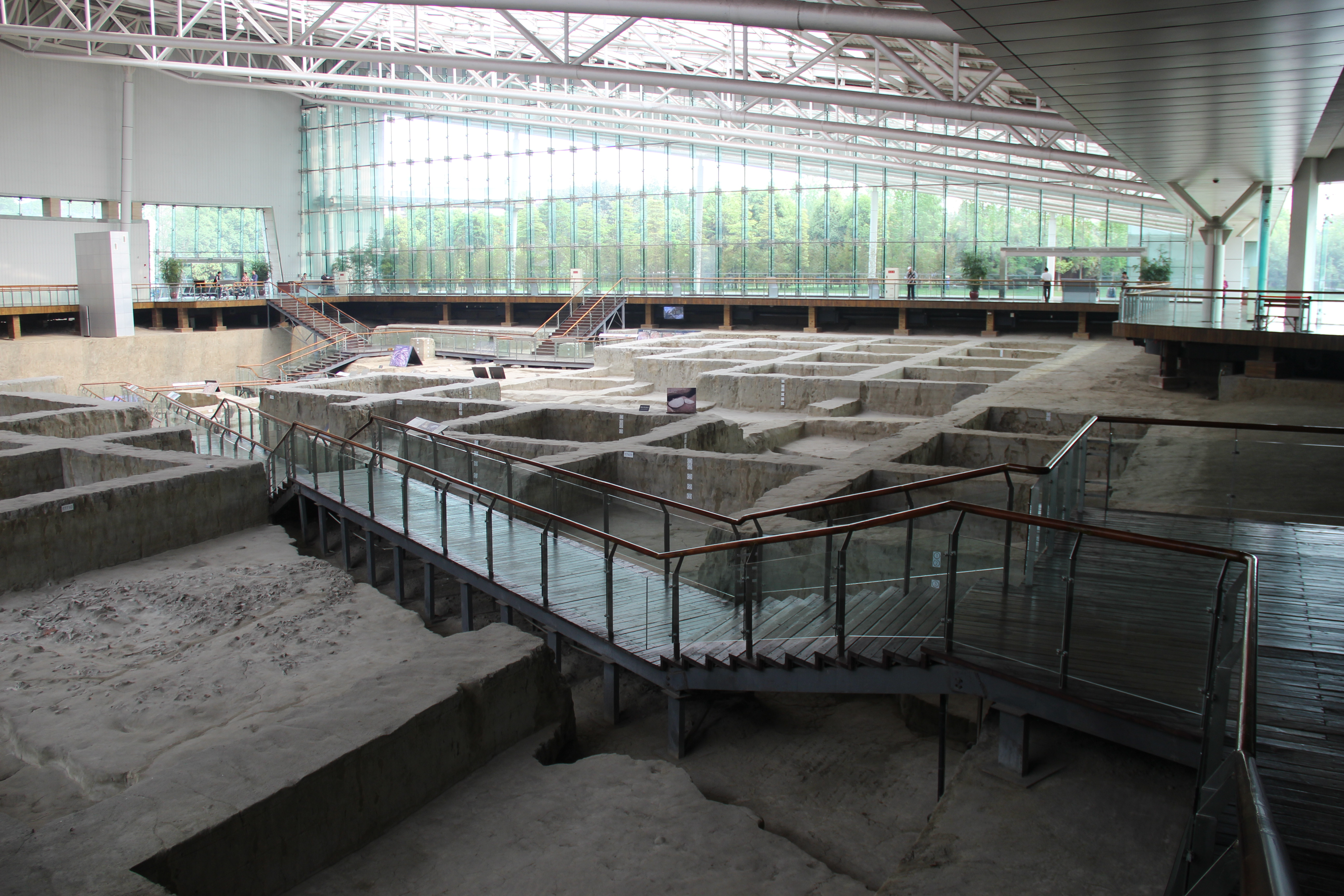
Glass panels at Jinsha Museum

The Jinsha Museum has played the central role in the site's conservation since its construction in 2007 as a shelter across 6 hectares. It aims to provide detailed information to tourists and conserve the site. Before its construction, no efforts were made to conserve the archaeological site. The site is listed on the UNESCO World Cultural Heritage Tentative List and Major Site Protected at the National Level.

=== Conservation methods ===
Conservation methods at the museum include temperature control, transparent curtain walls against ultra-violet rays and a controllable glass panel for air ventilation. The conservation department of the Jinsha Museum is responsible for security, surveillance and general maintenance – this is an attempt to prevent vandalism and destruction by the public. The Chengdu Museum communicates scientific advancements on conservation that could be beneficial for the site.

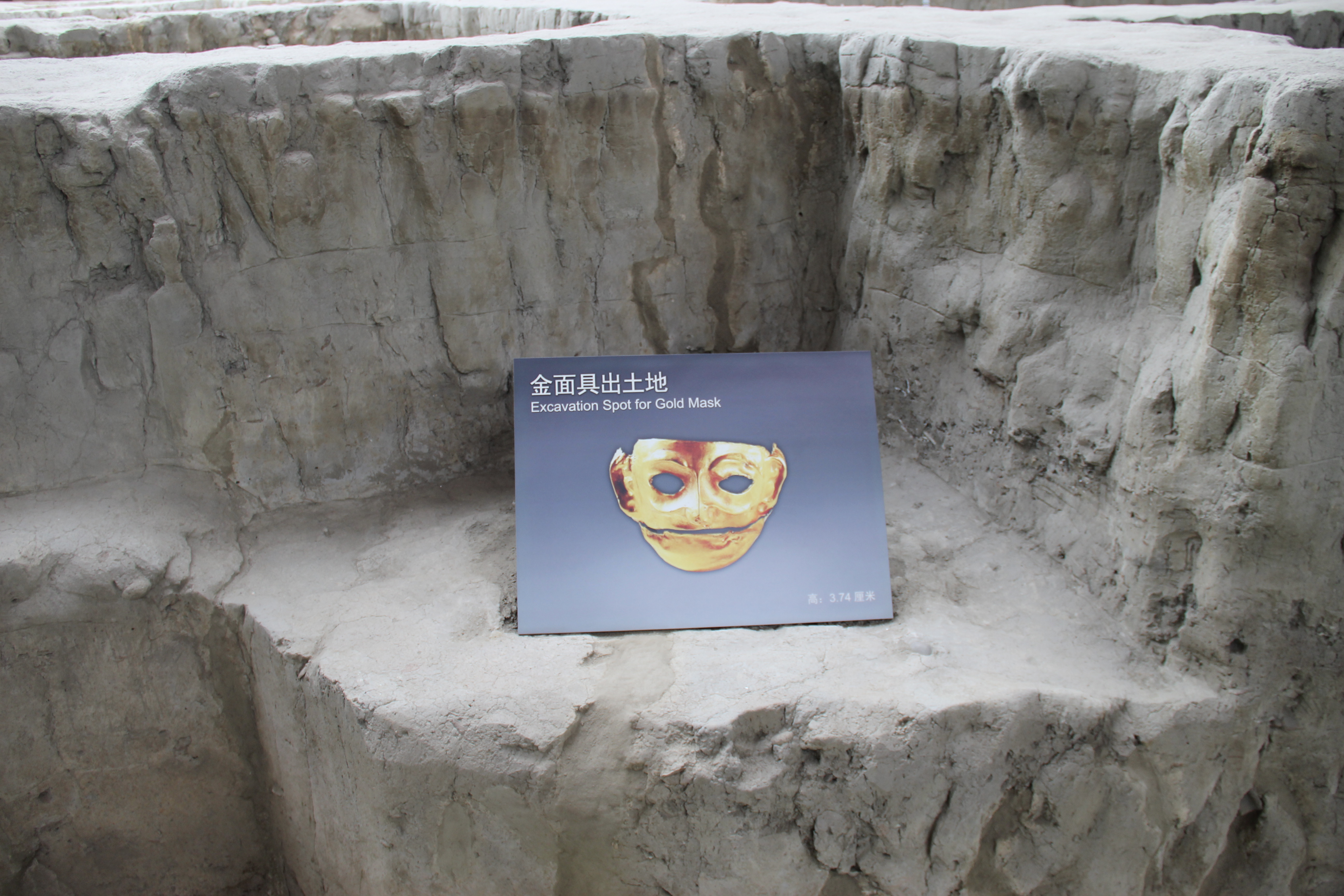
Cracks and mosses emerging from the features displayed at Jinsha Museum

A combined team from Jinsha Museum and Chengdu Museum implemented conservation strategies that targeted the moss and cracks forming on the site in 2007. After an analysis on the most effective biocide, the team distributed germall across the site in 2009. This removed mosses from the surface. Additionally, finely milled sand was used to fill in the cracks – this prevented them from enlarging. The difference in colour between the original surface and the sand was later evened for aesthetic purposes.

=== Problems with conservation ===
The environment and temperature at Jinsha encourage the growth of bacteria, mosses and cracks. A high concentration of illite was found in its soil, which makes the site's features and objects prone to cracking. There are concerns that the excavation grids and unprotected artefacts are vulnerable to sunlight, birds and wet weather. Despite the temperature control system, it remains unstable. Poor stabilisation aids the development of pathologies. Ceasing daily water sprinkling around the site has been recommended to reduce the humidity and moisture.

== The disappearance of the Jinsha settlement ==
Around 500 BCE to 200 BCE, the Jinsha settlement ended abruptly. While the reasons remain unclear, experts have proposed political revolution, catastrophic floods and earthquakes as possibilities. (Note: Information regarding the collapse of the Jinsha civilisation have predominately been written in Chinese. It is recognised that knowledge on the different perspectives could be enhanced by these readings.) Of these, the political conflict hypothesis has been criticised due to its unrealistic ability to cause an entire settlement to disappear.

=== Earthquake hypothesis ===
Sediment and radiocarbon analyses show that the Chengdu Plains experienced a number of large earthquakes over the past 5,000 years, with one occurring roughly every 1,000 years. One such earthquake, given its estimated timing, may have caused the disappearance of the Jinsha civilisation. It may have been similar in nature to the 2008 Sichuan Earthquake, which also occurred in the same geographical region. Not only could an earthquake have destroyed buildings (including homes), it could have also led to secondary natural disasters (such as floods and landslides), or rendered the surviving population more vulnerable to disease outbreaks. Such drastic environment and ecological changes could have necessitated a complete relocation.

=== Flood hypothesis ===
Field studies and sediment sampling show that sediment remains from ancient nearby rivers had been transported to the site. Within these sediment remains, there is a high concentration of relatively large grains, which is evidence for the occurrence of floods in the region. Therefore, it is plausible that one particularly destructive flood could have caused the collapse and sudden disappearance of the Jinsha civilisation.

The flood and earthquake hypotheses are not mutually exclusive, as earthquakes may induce floods.

== Images ==
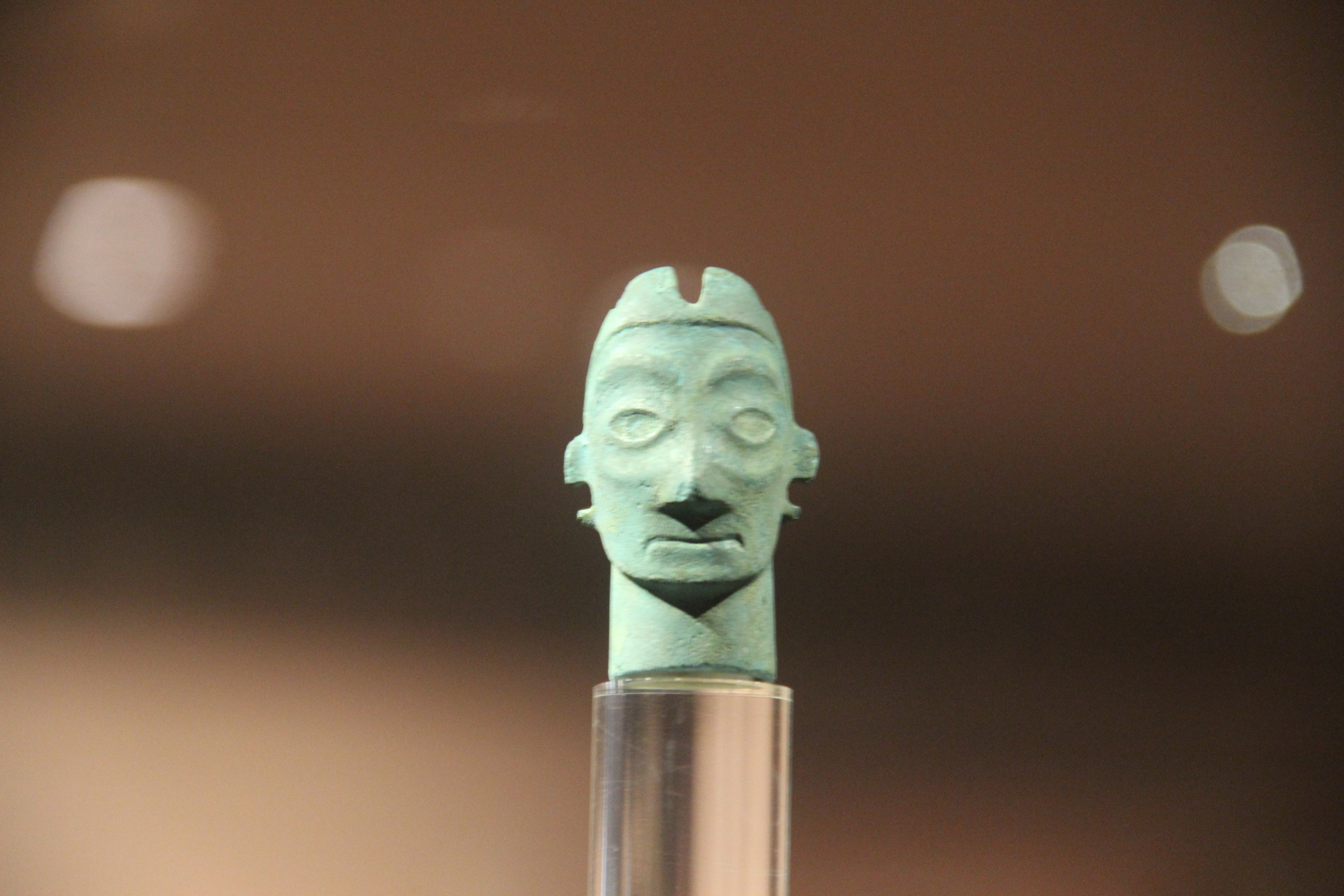
Bronze head at Jinsha Site Museum

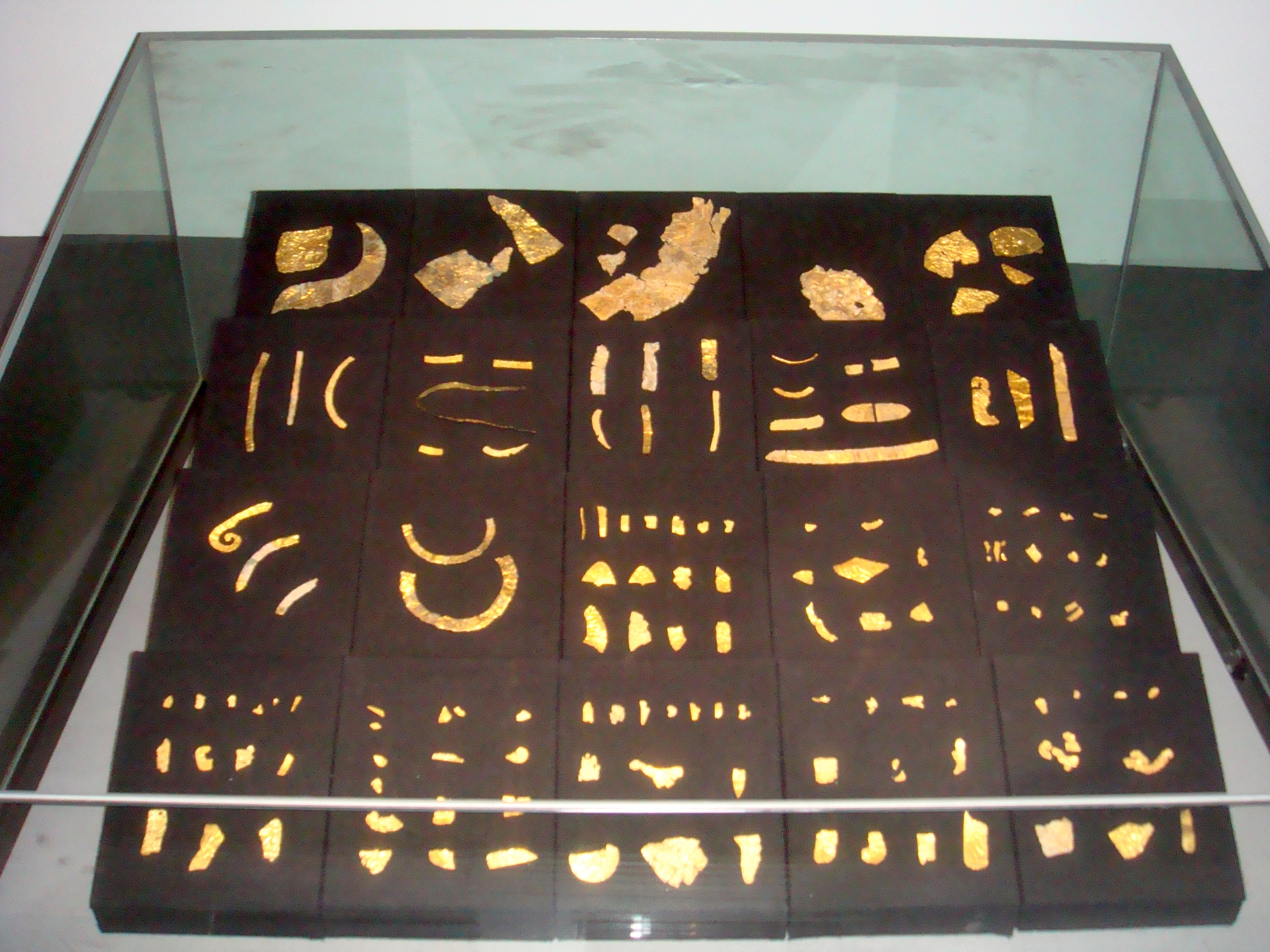
Golden Artifacts in Jinsha Site Museum

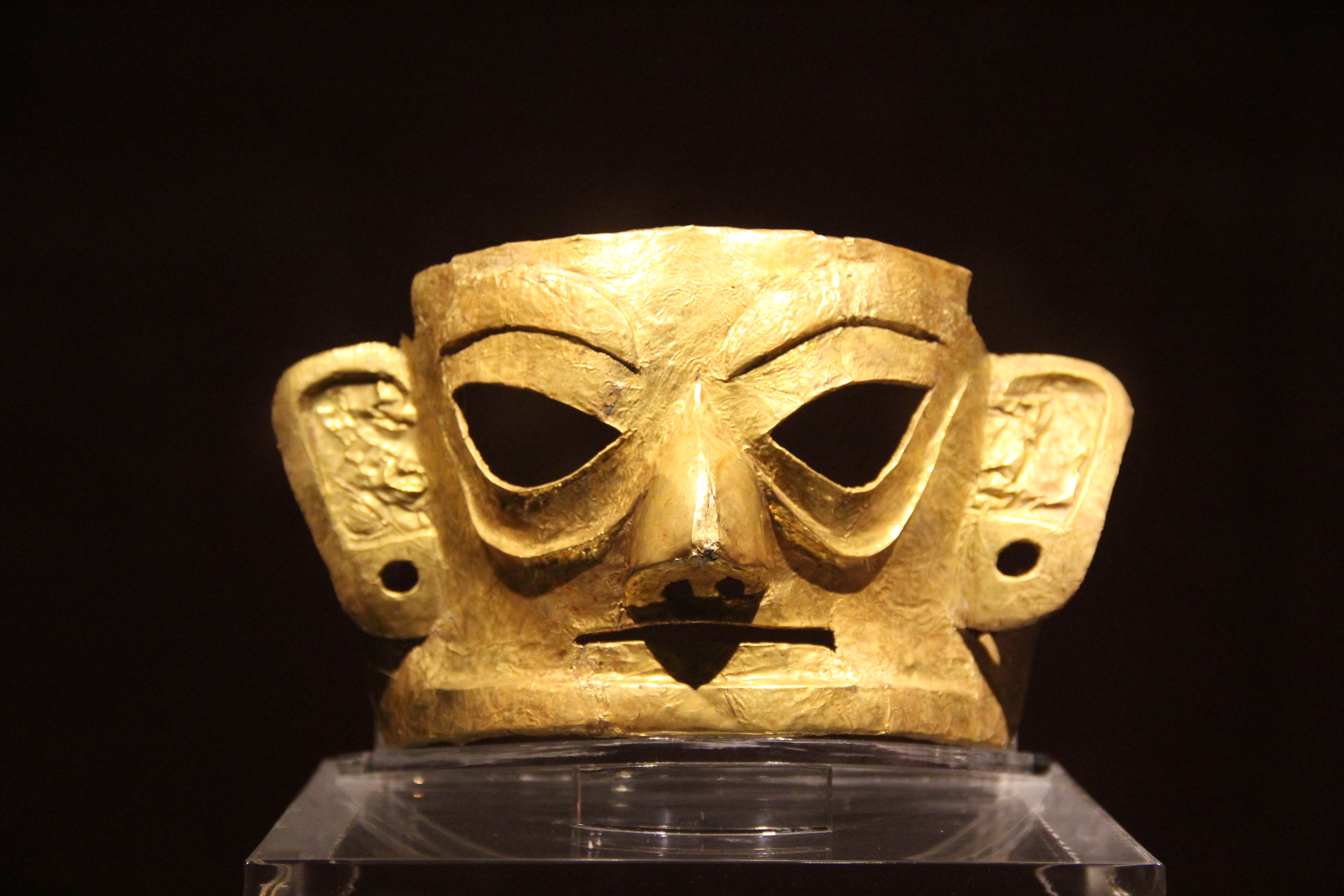
Gold mask

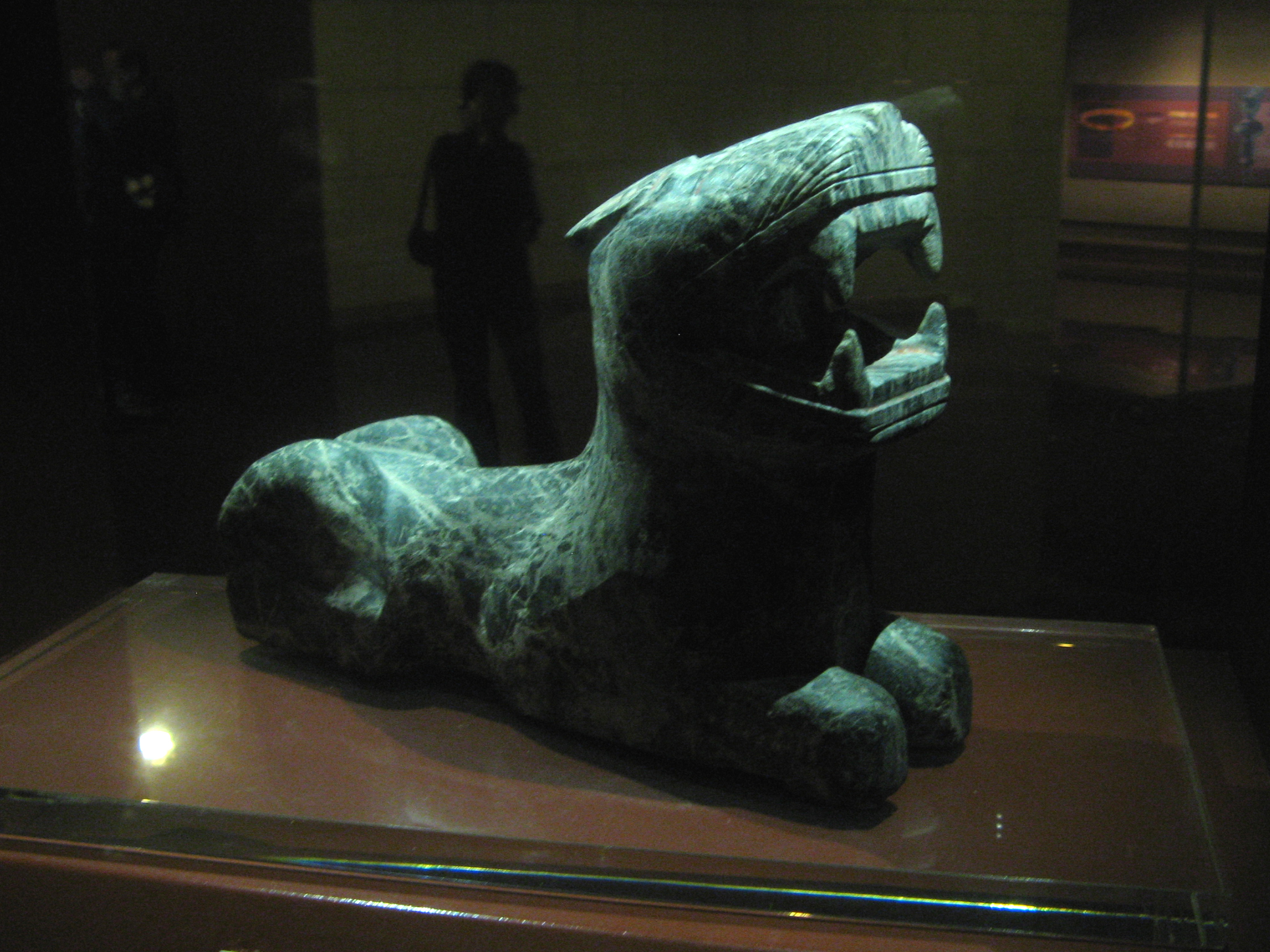
Tiger found in the ritual site (Note: The Kingdom of Shu seems to have worshipped tigers or employed to represent aspects of the divine.)

== See also ==
- Shu (kingdom)
- Baodun culture
- Clothing in ancient Shu
