= Germaben =

Germaben II is a clear, viscous liquid used to inhibit microbial, yeast and mould growth in cosmetics and other personal products. It contains propylene glycol, propylparaben, methylparaben, and diazolidinyl urea. It is a Registered Trademark of International Specialty Products.

Germaben II is used primarily by small businesses or home hobbyists who make soap, lotions, shampoos and other body care products.
