= Allantoin =

Organic compound and major metabolic intermediate

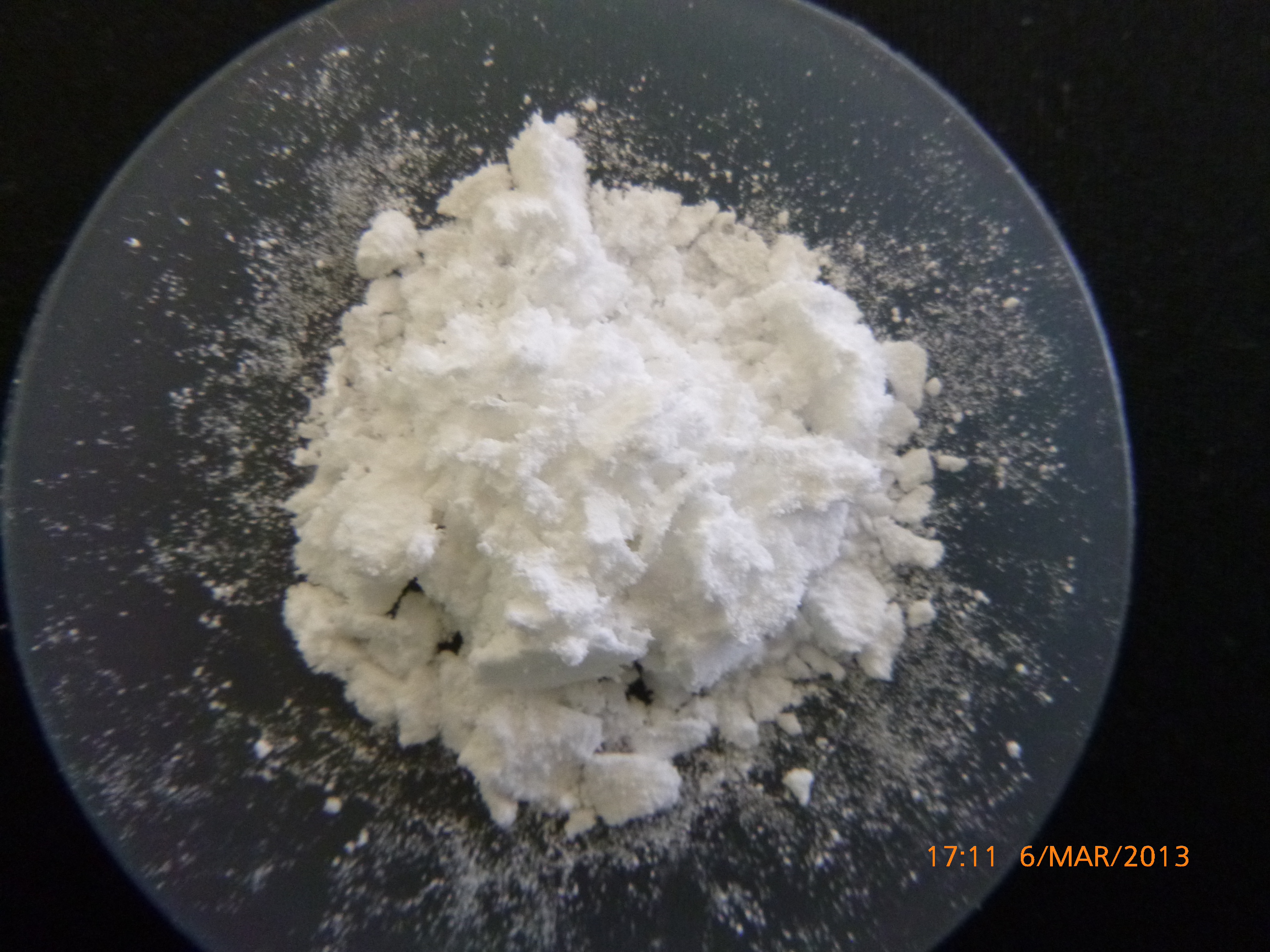

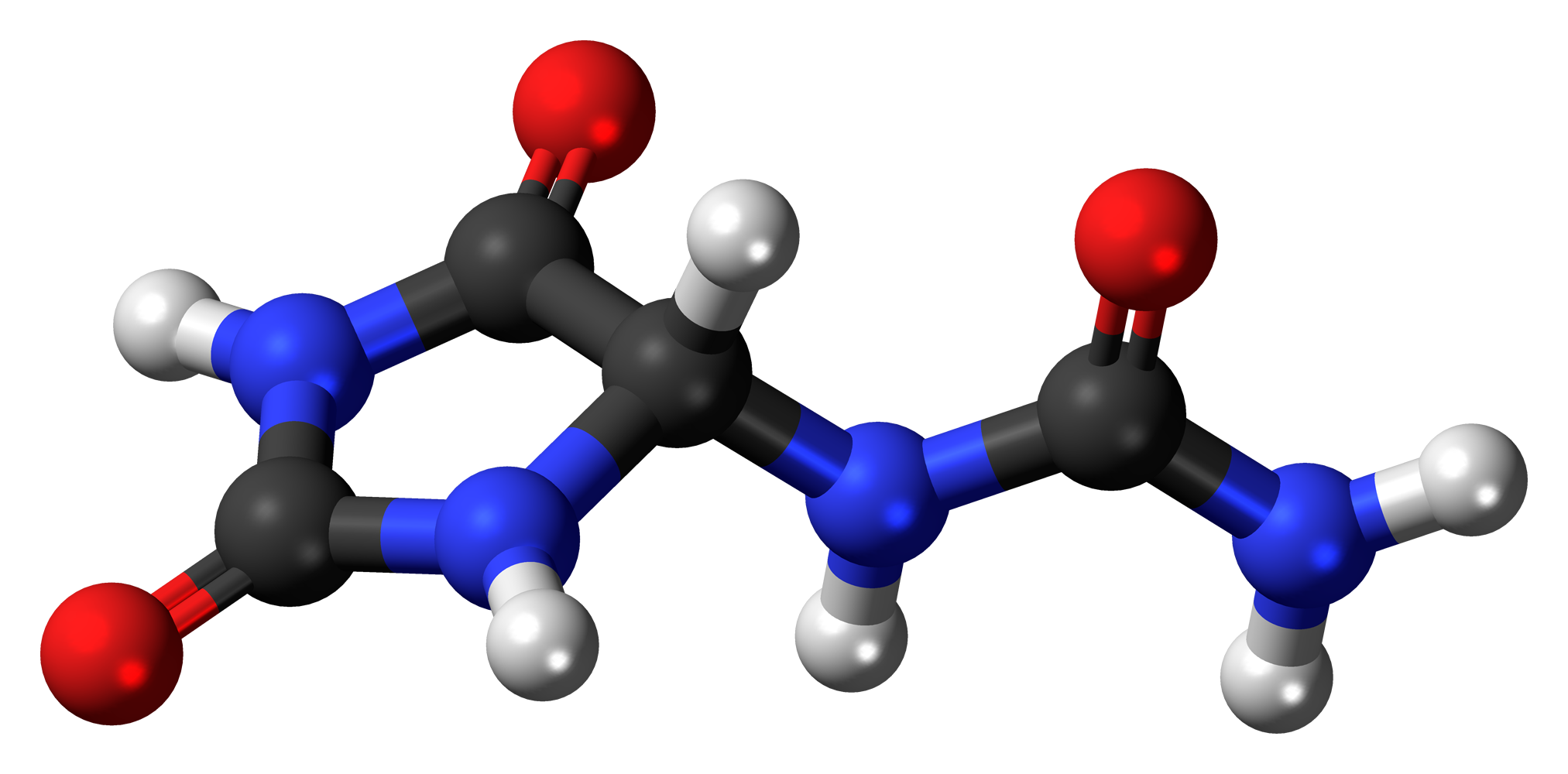

Names
- IUPAC name N-(2,5-Dioxoimidazolidin-4-yl)urea
- Other names 1-(2,5-Dioxoimidazolidin-4-yl)urea; Glyoxyldiureide; 5-Ureidohydantoin

Identifiers
CAS Number	97-59-6
3D model (JSmol)	Interactive image; Interactive image
ChEBI	CHEBI:15676
ChEMBL	ChEMBL593429
ChemSpider	199
ECHA InfoCard	100.002.358
EC Number	202-592-8
KEGG	D00121
PubChem CID	204
RTECS number	YT1600000
UNII	344S277G0Z
CompTox Dashboard (EPA)	DTXSID3020043
- InChI: InChI=1S/C4H6N4O3/c5-3(10)6-1-2(9)8-4(11)7-1/h1H,(H3,5,6,10)(H2,7,8,9,11) Key: POJWUDADGALRAB-UHFFFAOYSA-N; InChI=1/C4H6N4O3/c5-3(10)6-1-2(9)8-4(11)7-1/h1H,(H3,5,6,10)(H2,7,8,9,11) Key: POJWUDADGALRAB-UHFFFAOYAE
- SMILES: O=C1NC(=O)NC1NC(=O)N; C1(C(=O)NC(=O)N1)NC(=O)N

Properties
Chemical formula	C_{4}H_{6}N_{4}O_{3}
Molar mass	158.117 g·mol^{−1}
Appearance	colourless crystalline powder
Odor	odorless
Density	1.45 g/cm^{3}
Melting point	230 °C (446 °F; 503 K) (decomposes)
Boiling point	478 °C (892 °F; 751 K)
Solubility in water	0.57 g/100 mL (25 °C); 4.0 g/100 mL (75 °C)
Solubility	soluble in alcohol, pyridine, NaOH insoluble in ethyl ether
log P	−3.14
Acidity (pK_{a})	8.48

Hazards
NFPA 704 (fire diamond)	2 1 0
- Lethal dose or concentration (LD, LC)
LD_{50} (median dose)	> 5000 mg/kg (oral, rat)
Safety data sheet (SDS)	Allantoin MSDS
- Except where otherwise noted, data are given for materials in their standard state (at 25 °C [77 °F], 100 kPa). verify (what is ?) Infobox references

Allantoin is a chemical compound with formula C_{4}H_{6}N_{4}O_{3}. It is also called 5-ureidohydantoin or glyoxyldiureide. It is a diureide of glyoxylic acid. Allantoin is a major metabolic intermediate in most organisms including animals, plants and bacteria, though not humans. It is produced from uric acid, which itself is a degradation product of nucleic acids, by action of urate oxidase (uricase). Allantoin also occurs as a natural mineral compound (IMA symbol Aan).

== History ==
Allantoin was first isolated in 1800 by the Italian physician Michele Francesco Buniva (1761–1834) and the French chemist Louis Nicolas Vauquelin, who mistakenly believed it to be present in the amniotic fluid. In 1821, the French chemist Jean Louis Lassaigne found it in the fluid of the allantois; he called it "l'acide allantoique". In 1837, the German chemists Friedrich Wöhler and Justus Liebig synthesized it from uric acid and renamed it "allantoïn".

== Animals ==
Named after the allantois (an amniote embryonic excretory organ in which it concentrates during development in most mammals except humans and other hominids), it is a product of oxidation of uric acid by purine catabolism. After birth, it is the predominant means by which nitrogenous waste is excreted in the urine of these animals. In humans and other higher apes, the metabolic pathway for conversion of uric acid to allantoin is not present, so the former is excreted. Recombinant rasburicase is sometimes used as a drug to catalyze this metabolic conversion in patients. In fish, allantoin is broken down further (into ammonia) before excretion.

Allantoin has been shown to improve insulin resistance when administered to rats and to increase lifespan when administered to the nematode worm Caenorhabditis elegans.

== Bacteria ==
In bacteria, purines and their derivatives (such as allantoin) are used as secondary sources of nitrogen under nutrient-limiting conditions. Their degradation yields ammonia, which can then be utilized. For instance, Bacillus subtilis is able to utilize allantoin as its sole nitrogen source.

Mutants in the B. subtilis pucI gene were unable to grow on allantoin, indicating that it encodes an allantoin transporter.

In Streptomyces coelicolor, allantoinase (EC 3.5.2.5) and allantoicase (EC 3.5.3.4) are essential for allantoin metabolism. In this species the catabolism of allantoin, and the subsequent release of ammonium, inhibits antibiotic production (Streptomyces species synthesize about half of all known antibiotics of microbial origin).

== Applications ==
Allantoin is present in botanical extracts of the comfrey plant and in the urine of most mammals. Chemically synthesized bulk allantoin, which is chemically equivalent to natural allantoin, is safe, non-toxic, and compatible with cosmetic raw materials, and meets CTFA and JSCI requirements. Over 10,000 patents reference allantoin.

=== Cosmetics ===
Manufacturers may use allantoin as an ingredient in over-the-counter cosmetics for its antioxidant, anti-inflammatory and moisturizing properties. It is a humectant and hygroscopic, which make it a good moisturizer. It can also counteract other agents that may cause dryness like alcohols, sulfates, and fragrances.

=== Pharmaceuticals ===
Its anti-bacterial, exfoliating, anti-aging, and moisturizing properties make it useful in toothpaste, mouthwash, and other oral hygiene products, in shampoos, lipsticks, anti-acne products, sun care products, and clarifying lotions, various cosmetic lotions and creams, and other cosmetic and pharmaceutical products.

=== Biomarker of oxidative stress ===
Since uric acid is the end product of the purine metabolism in humans, only non-enzymatic processes with reactive oxygen species will give rise to allantoin, which is thus a suitable biomarker to measure oxidative stress in chronic illnesses and senescence.

== See also ==
- Imidazolidinyl urea and diazolidinyl urea, are antimicrobial condensation products of allantoin with formaldehyde.
