= Formaldehyde releaser =

Chemical compound used as a preservative

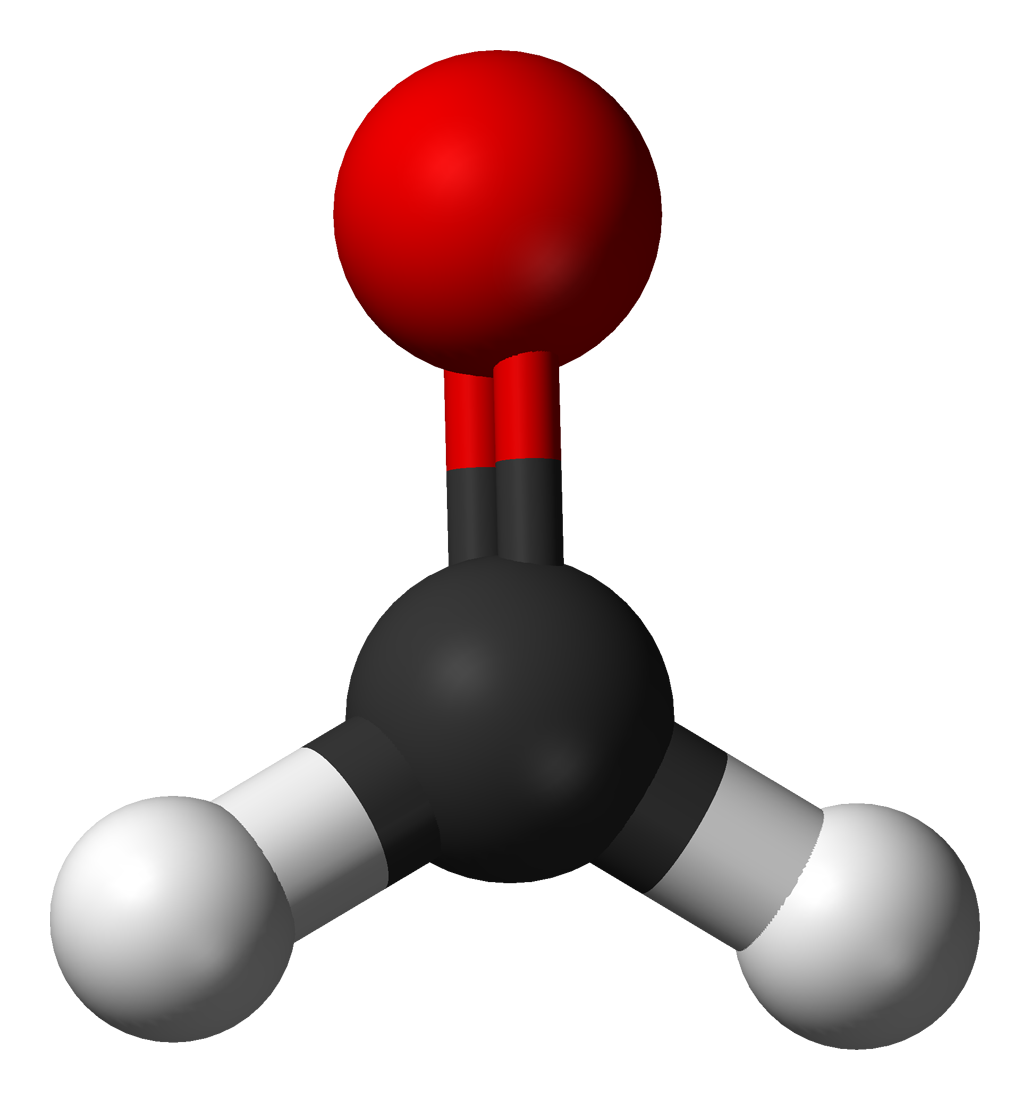
3D structure of Formaldehyde

A formaldehyde releaser, formaldehyde donor or formaldehyde-releasing preservative is a chemical compound that slowly releases formaldehyde. Formaldehyde-releasers are added to prevent microbial growth and extend shelf life. The intent of these compounds is that they release formaldehyde at levels that suppress microbial growth but sufficiently low to not threaten humans. The use of these chemicals in cosmetics has elicited controversy.

== Examples ==
Many compounds have been formulated as formaldehyde-releasers:

- Quaternium-15 (Dowicil 200; Dowicil 75; Dowicil 100; Dowco 184; Dowicide Q). It was used in low concentrations in cosmetics but has been banned in the EU since 2017 and a bill is under consideration in the US.
- DMDM hydantoin
- (ethylenedioxy)dimethanol (EDDM)
- (Benzyloxy)methanol (BHF, benzylhemiformal)
- 2,2',2''-(Hexahydro-1,3-5-triazine-1,3,5-triyl-)triethanol (HHT)
- Tetramethylolacetylenediurea (TMAD)
- 3,3'-Methylenebis[5-methyloxazolidine] (MBO)
- Imidazolidinyl urea (Germall 115), e.g. for cosmetics
- Diazolidinyl urea (Germall II), e.g. for cosmetics
- Tris(hydroxymethyl) nitromethane (Tris Nitro), occasionally used as a viscosity regulator in cosmetic preparations
- tris(N-hydroxyethyl) hexahydrotriazine (Grotan® BK)
- Sodium hydroxymethylglycinate, e.g. for cosmetics

=== Unintentional formaldehyde releasers ===
Some materials release formaldehyde unintentionally. These materials have also elicited considerable controversy, especially when these materials have household applications such as flooring. Examples:

- Delrin or Acetal
- Phenol formaldehyde resin
- Urea formaldehyde resin
- Melamine resin

== Uses ==
They are found in fuels, cosmetics, toiletries, cleaning agents, adhesives, paints, lacquers, fertilizers, and metalworking fluids. They are found in lysing agent for cells for in vitro diagnostic reagents. Photo-chemicals and press room chemicals also contain these releasers.

== Safety ==
Formaldehyde is dangerous to human health. In 2011, the US National Toxicology Program described formaldehyde as "known to be a human carcinogen".

The danger of formaldehyde is a major reason for the development of formaldehyde releasers which release formaldehyde slowly at lower levels.

=== Allergic reaction ===
Levels of 200–300 p.p.m. formaldehyde in cosmetic products can cause contact dermatitis in short-term use on normal skin.

A patch test study found that DMDM hydantoin in cosmetic products could increase the risk of cosmetic dermatitis.

Some people have a contact allergy to imidazolidinyl urea causing dermatitis. Such people are often also allergic to diazolidinyl urea. In 2005–06, it was the 14th-most-prevalent allergen in patch tests (3.7%).

=== Cancer ===
Some consumer cosmetics contain quaternium-15 for its antimicrobial properties. The American Cancer Society states that although quaternium-15 releases formaldehyde, a known carcinogen in laboratory test animals at relatively high doses, because the amount of formaldehyde released from these products is low, it is unclear that avoiding quaternium-15 in cosmetics provides any health benefits. Even so, Johnson & Johnson announced plans to phase out its use of quaternium-15 in cosmetic products by 2015 in response to consumer pressure.

== Importance ==
Formaldehyde in the EU is restricted to a maximum allowed concentration in finished products no greater than 0.2%. However, there are hidden sources of formaldehyde such as these formaldehyde releasers. As well, patch tests are prone to false positives at even low concentrations and not a reliable test.

Sensitization to formaldehyde has been decreasing since 1980 due in part to the replacement of formaldehyde by these formaldehyde releasers. As of 2009, frequency of sensitization to formaldehyde is stable at 2–3% in Europe. It might be as high as 9% in the USA.

== Alternatives ==
There are three groups of broad-spectrum preservatives with the most safety and efficacy.

- Parabens
- Formaldehyde releasers
- Halogenated compounds

The FDA requires that cosmetics have an effective preservative, and microbial challenge testing is conducted. The EU's Cosmetic Directive 76/768/EEC requires the use of a preservative on an approved list.

== Analysis ==
There are many ways to test and quantify formaldehyde. However these methods are not suitable for the determination of free formaldehyde in cosmetics with formaldehyde releasers since these methods often accelerate release of formaldehyde.

The physical method by 13C NMR spectroscopy does not affect the equilibrium between free and donor sources of formaldehyde and might be the best way to test for formaldehyde releasers.
