= EPA Safer Choice =

U.S. Environmental Protection Agency initiative

The EPA Safer Choice label

The U.S. Environmental Protection Agency’s (EPA's) Safer Choice label, previously known as the Design for the Environment (DfE) label, helps consumers and commercial buyers identify and select products with safer chemical ingredients, without sacrificing quality or performance. When a product has the Safer Choice label, it means that every intentionally-added ingredient in the product has been evaluated by EPA scientists. Only the safest possible functional ingredients are allowed in products with the Safer Choice label.

Safer Choice is a voluntary partnership program that is grounded in more than 40 years of EPA experience in evaluating the human health and environmental characteristics of chemicals. As of January 2015, more than 2,000 products qualify to carry the Safer Choice label. Businesses can apply to become partners by submitting their products to the Safer Choice program for review.

== Introduction ==
Since the mid-2000s, EPA's label for safer chemical products has been known as the Design for the Environment, or the DfE label. After spending more than a year collecting ideas and discussing new label options with stakeholders, such as product manufacturers and environmental and health advocates, the EPA took its ideas to consumers and asked what worked best. The result is the new Safer Choice label.

Products that carry the Safer Choice label must meet requirements for:

- Safer chemical ingredients
- Product performance
- Packaging sustainability
- Ingredient disclosure
- Surveillance and audits
- Volatile Organic Compounds (VOCs) emissions

== History ==
EPA's Safer Choice Program is a renaming of the Design for the Environment (DfE) Safer Product Labeling Program. DfE began in the early 1990s as an innovative, voluntary program to help companies consider human health, environmental, and economic effects of chemicals and technologies. DfE started the Safer Product Labeling Program as a project with the chemical-based products industry (e.g. cleaners and detergents) to help leading companies use safer chemicals to make high-performing products. DfE developed this certification program based on its Standard for Safer Products and safer chemical criteria, allowing companies to differentiate their products in the marketplace and making it easier for consumers and business purchasers to identify products that are safer for workers, families, pets, and the environment.

Using its science-based criteria that defines safer chemistry by chemical class, Safer Choice has helped the industry innovate and develop safer chemicals and chemical-based products. A number of companies have designed new chemicals to meet Safer Choice criteria, or invested in research to show that existing chemicals are safer.

In March 2015, the Safer Choice label replaced the DfE product label, marking the transition from the Safer Product Labeling Program to the Safer Choice Program. The new Safer Choice label helps consumers, businesses and institutional buyers easily recognize products that have earned EPA's Safer Choice certification.

In addition to the Safer Choice label above, Safer Choice offers an optional label that product manufacturers may use on products designated for businesses, office buildings, sports venues and schools. Safer Choice also has a label that indicates that a product is fragrance-free, to help consumers who prefer products without fragrance.

== Meaning of the label ==
When a product carries the Safer Choice label, it means that every intentionally added ingredient—no exceptions, no de minimis—in the product has been reviewed by EPA scientists. Only products that meet the Safer Choice Standard, which includes stringent human health and environmental criteria, are allowed to carry the label.

Safer Choice evaluates the individual constituents of every proprietary component of a product to ensure that it does not contain chemicals that may present potential health or environmental effects, including ingredients used in small percentages, like fragrances, preservatives, and dyes.

Safer Choice further requires its partners to undergo annual reviews, including on-site audits, to verify product ingredients and ensure compliance with all Safer Choice Program requirements.

== Qualifications to receive the label ==
Companies that enter into partnership with the Safer Choice Program and meet the Safer Choice Standard do so voluntarily. Companies that manufacture Safer Choice products have invested heavily in research and reformulation to ensure that their ingredients and finished products line up on the greener end of the health and environmental spectrum. These companies are leaders in safer products and sustainability.

== Types of products Safer Choice labels ==
Safer Choice labels a wide range of products for consumer and industry use, including:

- All-purpose cleaners
- Athletic field paints
- Bathroom cleaners
- Car cleaners
- Carpet cleaners
- Degreasers
- Dish detergents and hand soaps
- Floor care products
- Glass cleaners
- Laundry products
- Metal cleaners
- Pet care products
- Septic treatment products
- Wood cleaners
- Fragrances

== Safer Chemical Ingredients List ==
The Safer Chemical Ingredients List (SCIL) is a list of chemical ingredients that the Safer Choice Program has evaluated and determined to be safer than traditional chemical ingredients used for the same function. This list is arranged by functional-use class and is designed to help manufacturers find safer chemical alternatives that meet the criteria of the Safer Choice Program. Safer Choice ensures that no confidential or trade secret information appears in the list.

The Safer Choice Standard and the Criteria for Safer Chemical Ingredients are protective and address a broad range of potential toxicological effects (e.g., carcinogenicity, chronic toxicity and aquatic toxicity). All chemicals in the listing are among the safest for their functional use.

== Safer Choice Partner of the Year Awards ==
In 2015, the Safer Choice Program launched its Partner of the Year Awards to recognize program participants who have demonstrated leadership in furthering safer chemistry and products.

== Recent Developments and Program Defense (2025) ==
In early 2025, the Safer Choice program faced potential elimination as part of a broader EPA reorganization effort under the Trump administration. A coalition of more than 270 companies—including Colgate-Palmolive, Unilever, BASF, and Staples—submitted an open letter to the EPA urging the preservation of the program. These companies argued that Safer Choice is critical for ensuring the safety of chemical-based products, reducing regulatory uncertainty, and supporting U.S. manufacturing. The letter also cited that Safer Choice-certified products accounted for 2.4 billion pounds of production in 2024, a 150% increase since 2021.

== See also ==
Other EPA labeling programs

- Energy Star - Energy-efficient products
- WaterSense - Water-efficient products
