= Design for the environment =

Design approach that minimizes the environmental impact of a product, process or service

Design for the environment (DfE) is a design approach to reduce the overall human health and environmental impact of a product, process or service, where impacts are considered across its life cycle. Different software tools have been developed to assist designers in finding optimized products or processes/services. DfE is also the original name of a United States Environmental Protection Agency (EPA) program, created in 1992, that works to prevent pollution, and the risk pollution presents to humans and the environment. The program provides information regarding safer chemical formulations for cleaning and other products. EPA renamed its program "Safer Choice" in 2015.

== Introduction ==
Each piece of the pie chart depicts the role that the individual processes play in the overall design and production of a product. In recent years the environment has begun to play an important role in this diagram. If any piece is missing, production may not be able to occur.

Initial guidelines for a DfE approach were written in 1990 by East Meets West, a New York-based non-governmental organization founded by Anneke van Waesberghe. It became a global movement targeting design initiatives and incorporating environmental motives to improve product design in order to minimize health and environmental impacts by incorporating it from design stage all the way to the manufacturing process. The DfE strategy aims to improve technology and design tactics to expand the scope of products. By incorporating eco-efficiency into design tactics, DfE takes into consideration the entire life-cycle of the product, while still making products usable but minimizing resource use. The key focus of DfE is to minimize the environmental-economic cost to consumers while still focusing on the life-cycle framework of the product. By balancing both customer needs as well as environmental and social impacts DfE aims to "improve the product use experience both for consumers and producers, while minimally impacting the environment".

== Practices ==
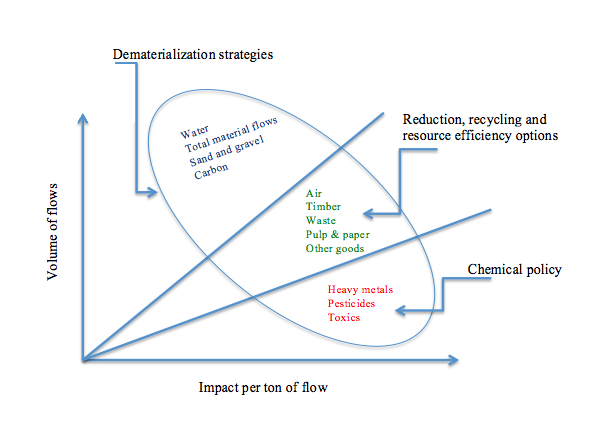
Resource consumption and mitigation strategies for product production which minimizes environmental and health impacts.This figure has been adapted from Spangenberg et al.:

Four main concepts that fall under the DfE umbrella.

- Design for environmental processing and manufacturing: Raw material extraction (mining, drilling, etc.), processing (processing reusable materials, metal melting, etc.) and manufacturing are done using materials and processes which are not dangerous to the environment or the employees working on said processes. This includes the minimization of waste and hazardous by-products, air pollution, energy expenditure and other factors.
- Design for environmental packaging: Materials used in packaging are environmentally responsible, which can be achieved through the reuse of shipping products, elimination of unnecessary paper and packaging products, efficient use of materials and space, use of recycled and/or recyclable materials.
- Design for disposal or reuse: The end-of-life of a product is very important, because some products emit dangerous chemicals into the air, ground and water after they are disposed of in a landfill. Planning for the reuse or refurbishing of a product will change the types of materials that would be used, how they could later be disassembled and reused, and the environmental impacts such materials have.
- Design for energy efficiency: The design of products to reduce overall energy consumption throughout the product's life.

Life-cycle assessment (LCA) is employed to forecast the impacts of different (production) alternatives of the product in question, thus being able to choose the most environmentally friendly. A life cycle analysis can serve as a tool when determining the environmental impact of a product or process. Proper LCAs can help a designer compare several different products according to several categories, such as energy use, toxicity, acidification, CO_{2} emissions, ozone depletion, resource depletion and many others. By comparing different products, designers can make decisions about which environmental hazard to focus on in order to make the product more environmentally friendly.

== Rationale ==
Modern day businesses aim to produce goods at a low cost while maintaining quality, staying competitive in the global marketplace, and meeting consumer preferences for more environment friendly products. To help businesses meet these challenges, EPA encourages businesses to incorporate environmental considerations into the design process. The benefits of incorporating DfE include: cost savings, reduced business and environmental risks, expanded business and market opportunities, and to meet environmental regulations.

== Companies and products ==
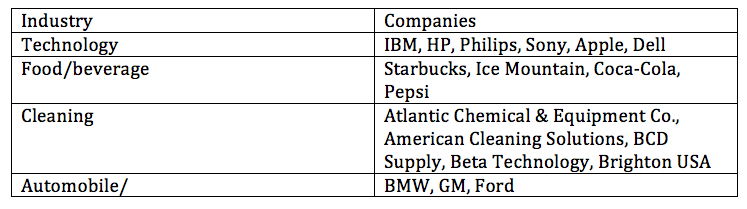
Designfortheenvironment Fig3

- Starbucks: Starbucks is decreasing its carbon footprint by building more energy efficient stores and facilities, conserving energy and water, and purchasing renewable energy credits. Starbucks has achieved LEED certificates in 116 stores in 12 countries. Starbucks has even created a portable, LEED certified store in Denver. It is Starbucks' goal to reduce energy consumption by 25% and to cover 100% of its electricity with renewable energy by 2015.
- Hewlett Packard: HP is working towards reducing energy used in manufacturing, developing materials that have less environmental impact, and designing easily recyclable equipment.
- IBM: Their goal is to extend product life beyond just production, and to use reusable and recyclable products. This means that IBM is currently working on creating products that can be safely disposed of at the end of its product life. They are also reducing consumption of energy to minimize their carbon footprint.
- Philips: For almost 20 years now, sustainable development has been a crucial part of Philips decision making and manufacturing process. Philips' goal is to produce products with their environmental responsibility in mind. Not only are they working on reducing energy during the manufacturing process, Phillips is also participating in a unique project, philanthropy through design. Since 2005, Philips has been working on and developing philanthropy through design. They collaborate with other organizations to use their expertise and innovation to help the more fragile parts of our society.

Besides these large brand names there are several other consumer product companies in the DfE program this including:

- Atlantic Chemical & Equipment Co.
- American Cleaning Solutions
- BCD Supply
- Beta Technology
- Brighton USA

== Design process ==
A business can design for the environment by:

- Evaluating the human health and environmental impacts of its processes and products.
- Identifying what information is needed to make human health and environment decisions
- Conducting an assessment of alternatives
- Considering cross-media impacts and the benefits of substituting chemicals
- Reducing the use and release of toxic chemicals through the innovation of cleaner technologies that use safer chemicals.
- Implementing pollution prevention, energy efficiency, and other resource conservation measures.
- Making products that can be reused and recycled
- Monitoring the environmental impacts and costs associated with each product or process
- Recognizing that although change can be rapid, in many cases a cycle of evaluation and continuous improvement is needed.

== Safer Choice labeling program ==
EPA's DfE labeling program was renamed "Safer Choice" in 2015.

== Current U.S. laws and regulations encouraging DfE in the electronics industry ==
=== National Ambient Air Quality Standards (NAAQS) ===
EPA promulgated the National Ambient Air Quality Standards (NAAQS) to establish basic air pollution control requirements across the U.S. The NAAQS sets standards on six main sources of pollutants, which include emissions of: ozone (0.12 ppm per 1 hour), carbon monoxide (35 ppm per 1 hour; primary standard), particulate matter (50g/m^3 at an annual arithmetic mean), sulfur dioxide (80g/m^3 at an annual arithmetic mean), nitrogen dioxide (100g/m^3 at an annual arithmetic mean), and lead emissions (1.5g/m^3 at an annual arithmetic mean).

=== Stratospheric ozone protection ===
Stratospheric ozone protection is required by section 602 of the Clean Air Act of 1990. This regulation aims to decrease emission of chlorofluorocarbons (CFCs) and other chemicals that are destroying the stratospheric ozone layer. The protection initiative categorizes ozone-depleting substances into two classes: Class I, and Class II.

Class I substances include 20 different kinds of chemicals and have all been phased-out of production processes since 2000. Class II substances consist of 33 different hydro-chlorofluorocarbons (HCFCs). The EPA has already begun plans to decrease emissions in HCFCs and plan to completely phase out the class II substances by 2030.

=== Reporting requirements for releases of toxic substances ===
A firm operating in the electronics industry in Standard Industrial Classification (SIC) Codes 20-39 that has more than 10 full-time employees and consumes more than 10,000 lbs per year of any toxic chemical lists in 40 CFR 372.65 must file a toxic release inventory.

=== Other regulations ===
- National Emissions Standards for Hazardous Air Pollutants (NESHAP)
- National Pollutant Discharge Elimination System (NPDES–Water pollution permit program)
- Underground Injection Control Program
- Hazardous waste management
- Underground storage tank management

== See also ==
- Biodiversity
- Conservation movement
- Design impact measures
- Ecodesign
- Environmental design
- Environmental movement
- Leadership in Energy and Environmental Design
- Life-cycle assessment
- Natural environment
- Sustainable design
- Sustainability
