= Diazolidinyl urea =

Antimicrobial preservative used in cosmetics

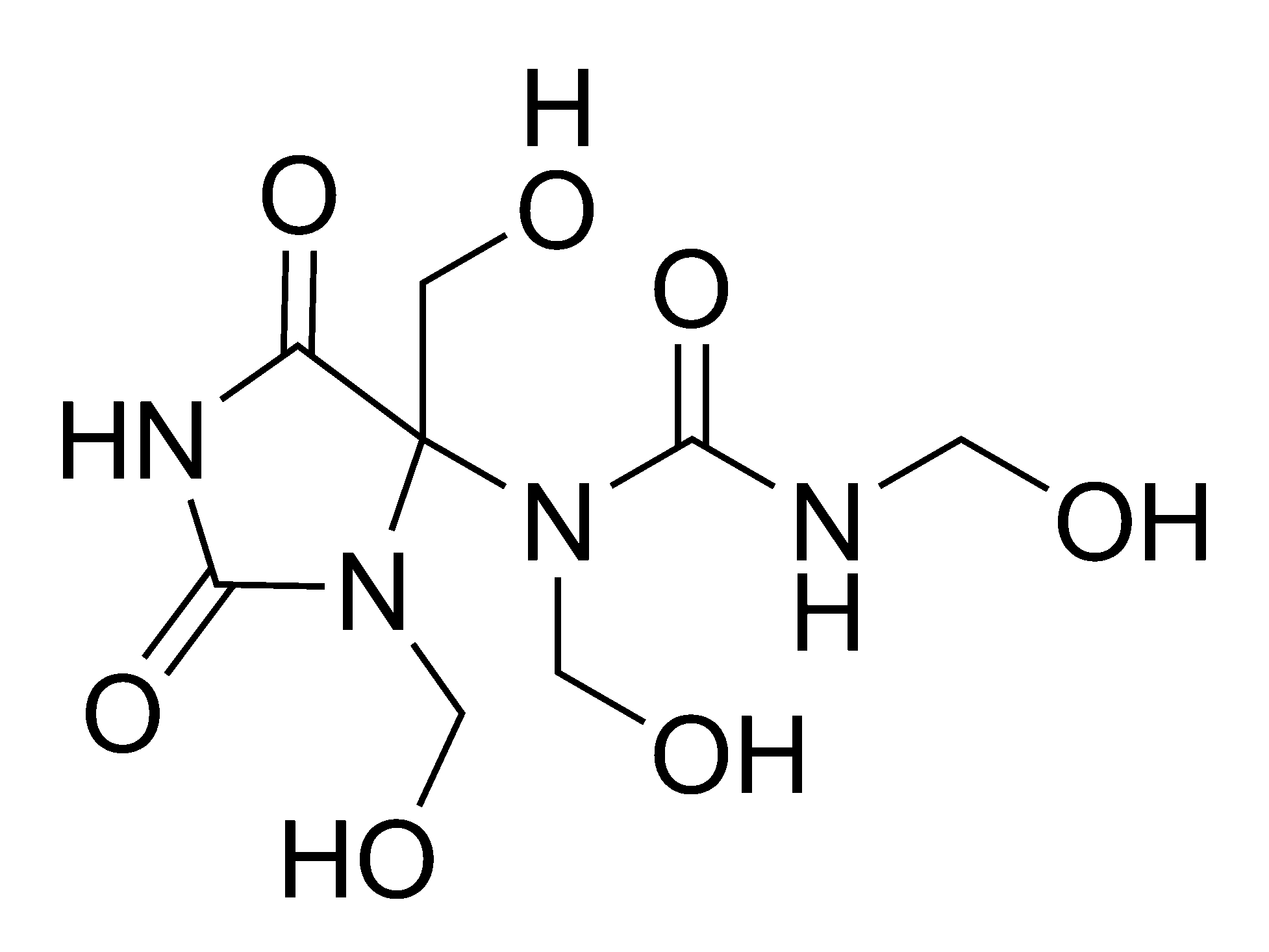
- newly determined structure

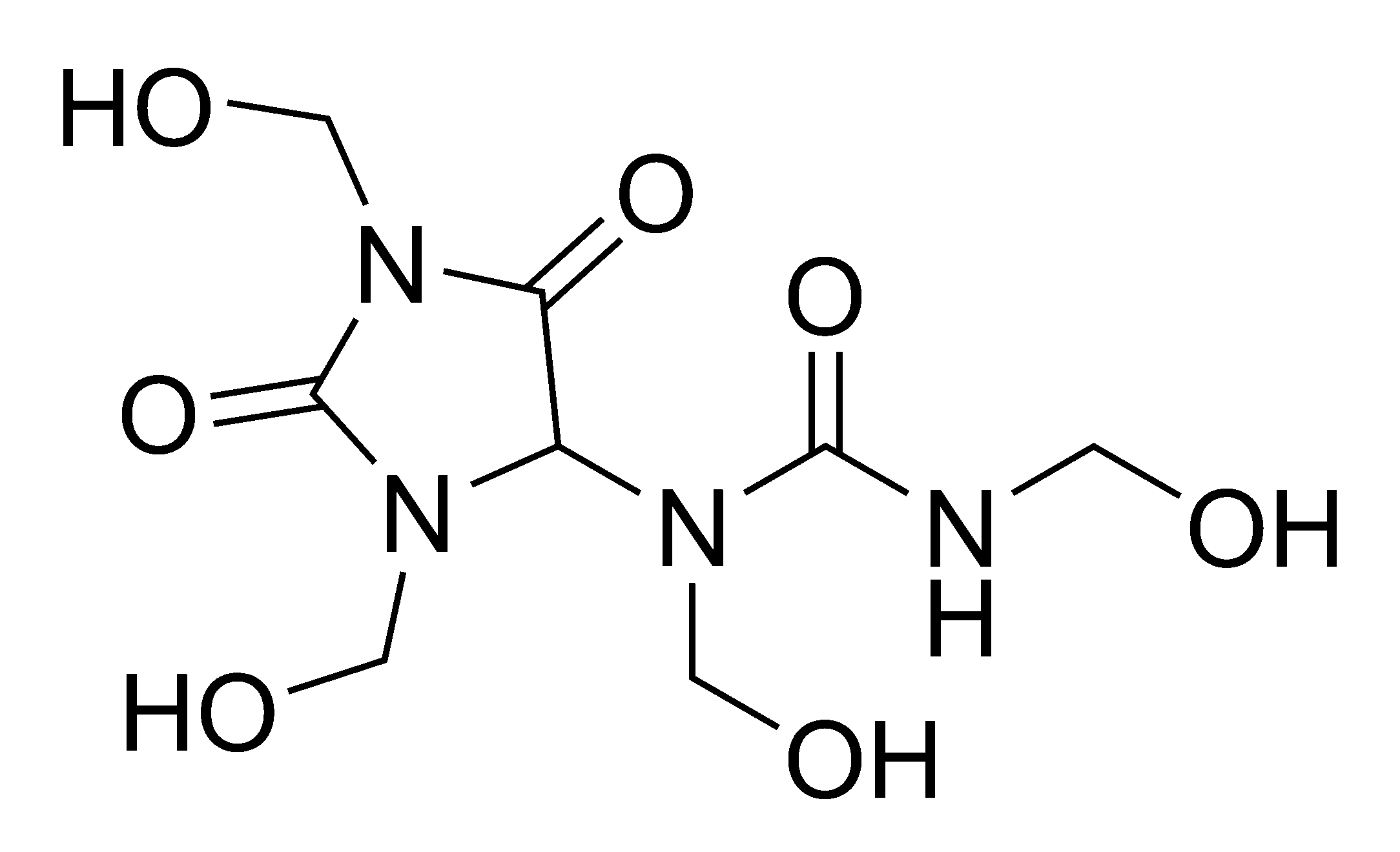
- "traditional" structure

Names
- IUPAC names 1-[3,4-bis(hydroxymethyl)-2,5-dioxoimidazolidin-4-yl]-1,3-bis(hydroxymethyl)urea (new); 1-[1,3-bis(hydroxymethyl)-2,5-dioxoimidazolidin-4-yl]-1,3-bis(hydroxymethyl)urea (old)
- Other names Diazolidinylurea; Germall II

Identifiers
| CAS Number | 78491-02-8 |
| 3D model (JSmol) | Interactive image |
| ChemSpider | 56078 |
| ECHA InfoCard | 100.071.732 |
| EC Number | 278-928-2 |
| PubChem CID | 62277 |
| UNII | H5RIZ3MPW4 |
| CompTox Dashboard (EPA) | DTXSID0029559 |
- InChI: InChI=1S/C8H14N4O7/c13-1-9-7(18)10(2-14)5-6(17)12(4-16)8(19)11(5)3-15/h5,13-16H,1-4H2,(H,9,18) Key: SOROIESOUPGGFO-UHFFFAOYSA-N; InChI=1/C8H14N4O7/c13-1-9-7(18)10(2-14)5-6(17)12(4-16)8(19)11(5)3-15/h5,13-16H,1-4H2,(H,9,18) Key: SOROIESOUPGGFO-UHFFFAOYAO
- SMILES: O=C1N(C(=O)C(N(C(=O)NCO)CO)N1CO)CO

Properties
| Chemical formula | C_{8}H_{14}N_{4}O_{7} |
| Molar mass | 278.22 g/mol |

Hazards
- GHS labelling
| Signal word | Warning |
| Hazard statements | H317 |
| Precautionary statements | P261, P272, P280, P302+P352, P321, P333+P313, P363, P501 |
| NFPA 704 (fire diamond) | 1 1 0 |

Related compounds
| Related compounds | Imidazolidinyl urea |
- Except where otherwise noted, data are given for materials in their standard state (at 25 °C [77 °F], 100 kPa). verify (what is ?) Infobox references

Diazolidinyl urea is an antimicrobial preservative used in cosmetics. It is chemically related to imidazolidinyl urea which is used in the same way. Diazolidinyl urea acts as a formaldehyde releaser.

It is used in many cosmetics, skin care products, shampoos and conditioners, as well as a wide range of products including bubble baths, baby wipes and household detergents. Diazolidinyl urea is found in the commercially available preservative Germaben.

Commercial diazolidinyl urea is a mixture of different formaldehyde addition products including polymers.

== Chemistry ==
=== Synthesis ===
Diazolidinyl urea is produced by the chemical reaction of allantoin and formaldehyde in the presence of sodium hydroxide solution and heat. The reaction mixture is then neutralized with hydrochloric acid and evaporated:

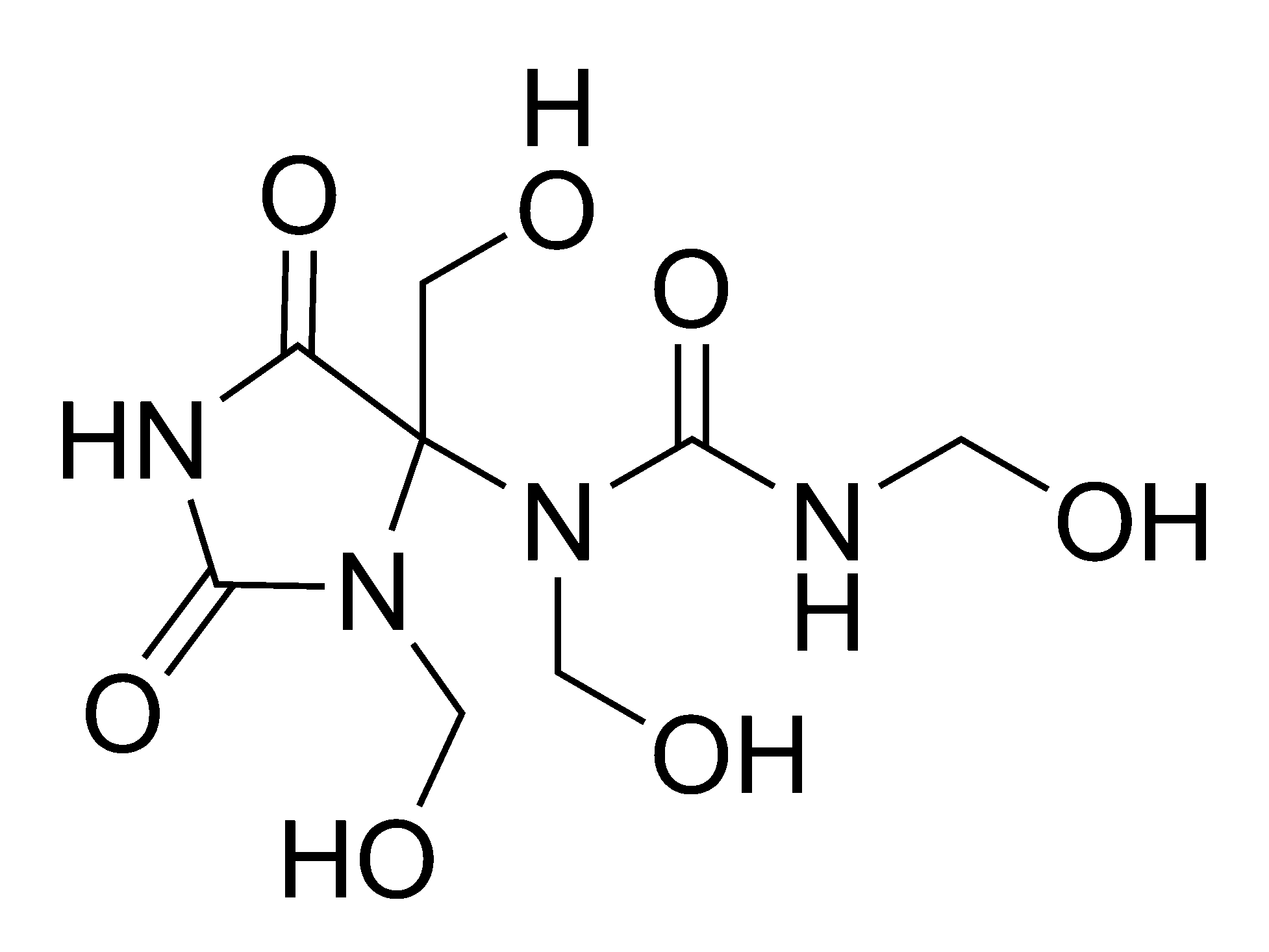
+ 4 H_{2}C=O →

=== Structure ===
Diazolidinyl urea was poorly characterized until recently and the single Chemical Abstracts Service structure assigned to it is probably not the major one in the commercial material. Instead, new data indicate that one of the hydroxymethyl functional groups of the imidazolidine ring is attached to the carbon, rather than on the urea nitrogen atom:

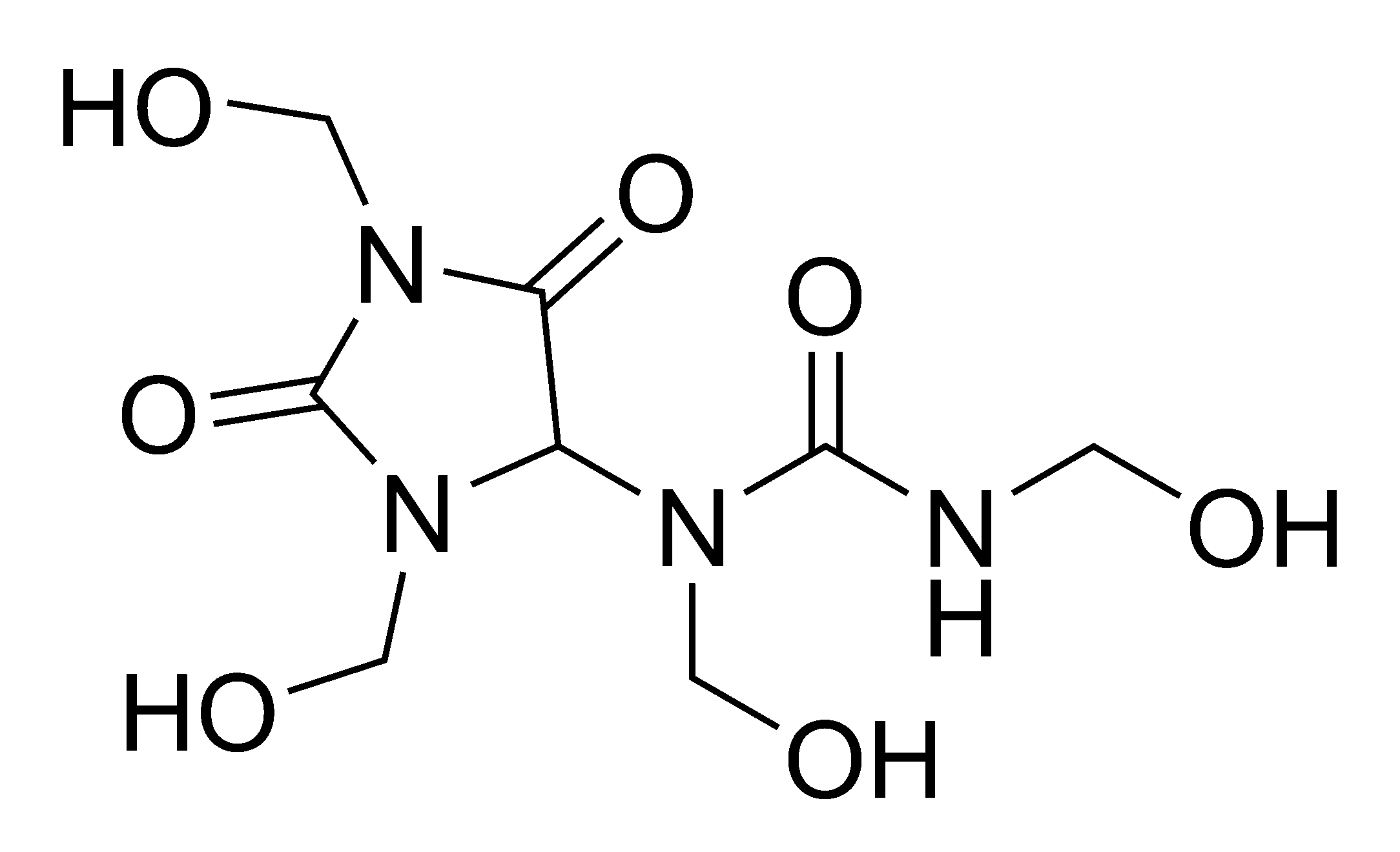
Originally reported structure

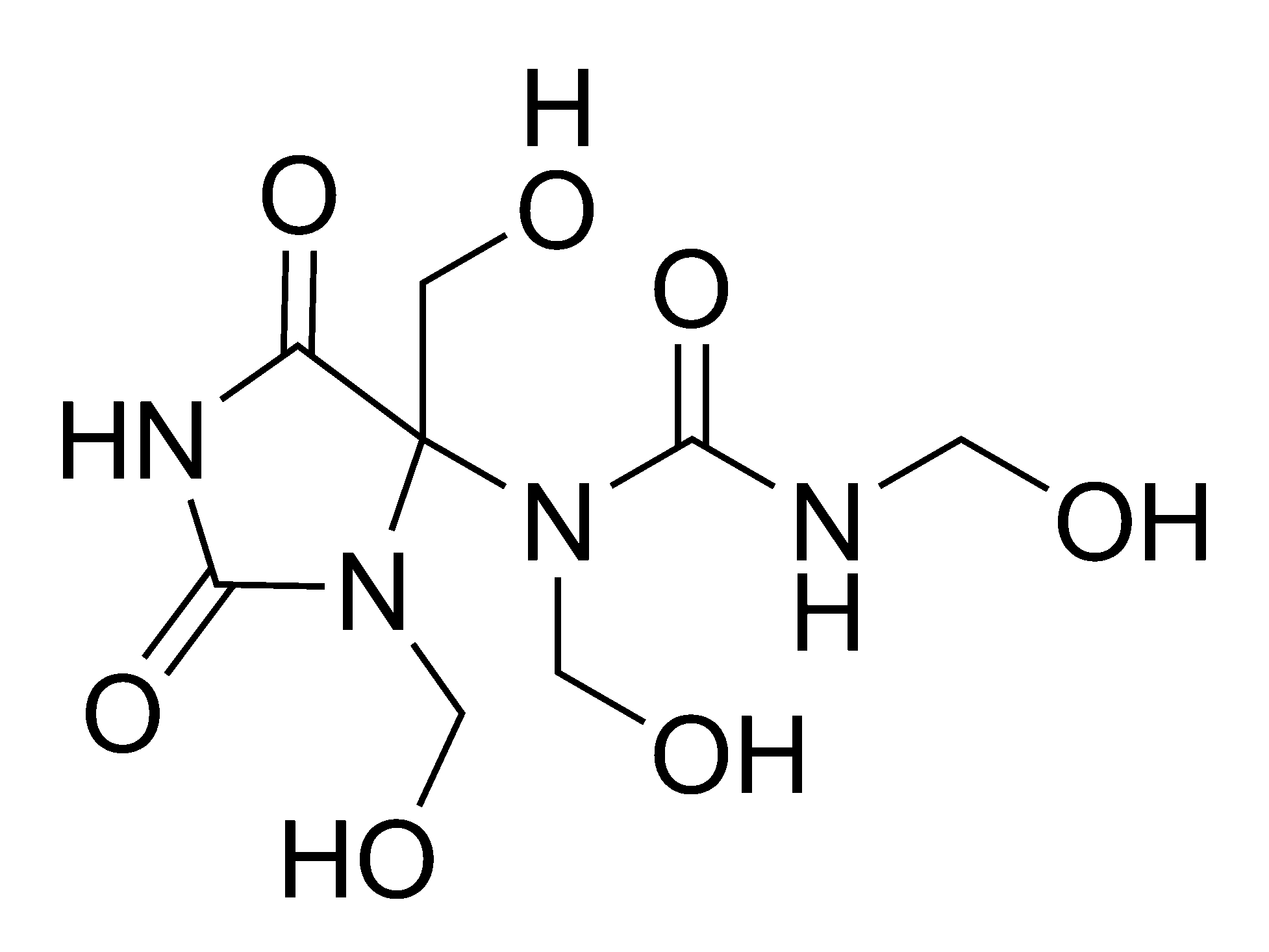
Hoeck's revised structure

== Safety ==
Some people have a contact allergy to imidazolidinyl urea causing dermatitis. Such people are often also allergic to diazolidinyl urea.

In addition to being an allergen, it is a formaldehyde releaser, since it generates formaldehyde slowly as it degrades. Although the formaldehyde acts as a bactericidal preservative, it is a known carcinogen.

In 2005–06, it was the 14th-most-prevalent allergen in patch tests (3.7%).
