= DMDM hydantoin =

Chemical compound

Names
- Preferred IUPAC name 1,3-Bis(hydroxymethyl)-5,5-dimethylimidazolidine-2,4-dione
- Other names 1,2-Dimethylol-5,6-dimethylhydantoine; Glydant

Identifiers
CAS Number	6440-58-0
3D model (JSmol)	Interactive image
Abbreviations	DMDMH
ChemSpider	21482
ECHA InfoCard	100.026.566
EC Number	229-222-8
PubChem CID	22947
UNII	BYR0546TOW
CompTox Dashboard (EPA)	DTXSID8035217
- InChI: InChI=1S/C7H12N2O4/c1-7(2)5(12)8(3-10)6(13)9(7)4-11/h10-11H,3-4H2,1-2H3 Key: WSDISUOETYTPRL-UHFFFAOYSA-N; InChI=1/C7H12N2O4/c1-7(2)5(12)8(3-10)6(13)9(7)4-11/h10-11H,3-4H2,1-2H3 Key: WSDISUOETYTPRL-UHFFFAOYAB
- SMILES: O=C1N(C(=O)C(N1CO)(C)C)CO

Properties
Chemical formula	C_{7}H_{12}N_{2}O_{4}
Molar mass	188.18 g/mol

Hazards
- GHS labelling
Pictograms	(GHS07: Exclamation mark)
Signal word	Warning
Hazard statements	H302
Precautionary statements	P301+P312
- Except where otherwise noted, data are given for materials in their standard state (at 25 °C [77 °F], 100 kPa). verify (what is ?) Infobox references

DMDM hydantoin is an antimicrobial formaldehyde releaser preservative with the trade name Glydant. DMDM hydantoin is an organic compound belonging to a class of compounds known as hydantoins. It is used in the cosmetics industry and found in products like shampoos, hair conditioners, hair gels, and skin care products.

DMDM hydantoin slowly releases formaldehyde and works as a preservative by making the environment less favorable to microorganisms.

== Safety ==
A patch test study was conducted on 35 patients with existing formaldehyde allergies, 14 of which were tested with DMDM hydantoin. The authors state that "an increase in the use of DMDM hydantoin in cosmetic products will also inevitably increase the risk of cosmetic dermatitis in consumers allergic to formaldehyde." However, only 8 of the 14 patients tested with DMDM hydantoin reacted to the chemical.

The safety of formaldehyde in occupational settings is a topic of ongoing concern, given the prevalence of formaldehyde and formaldehyde releasers in industrial uses. Formaldehyde is considered "an important metabolic product in plants and animals (including humans), where it occurs in low but measurable concentrations." However, long-term exposure to formaldehyde (particularly routine inhalation of its fumes) is thought to cause irritation of the eyes and mucous membranes, headaches, shortness of breath, and aggravation of asthma symptoms. In 2021, Health Canada reported that airborne formaldehyde in Canadian homes was caused primarily by off-gassing and combustion, though on average, levels "were below the recommended long-term exposure limit." It was declared a "toxic product" by the 1999 Canadian Environmental Protection Act, and the US National Toxicology Program officially classed formaldehyde as "known to be a human carcinogen" in June 2011.

In the EU, the maximum allowed concentration of formaldehyde in finished products is 0.2%, and any product that exceeds 0.05% has to include a warning that the product contains formaldehyde.
