= Imidazolidinyl urea =

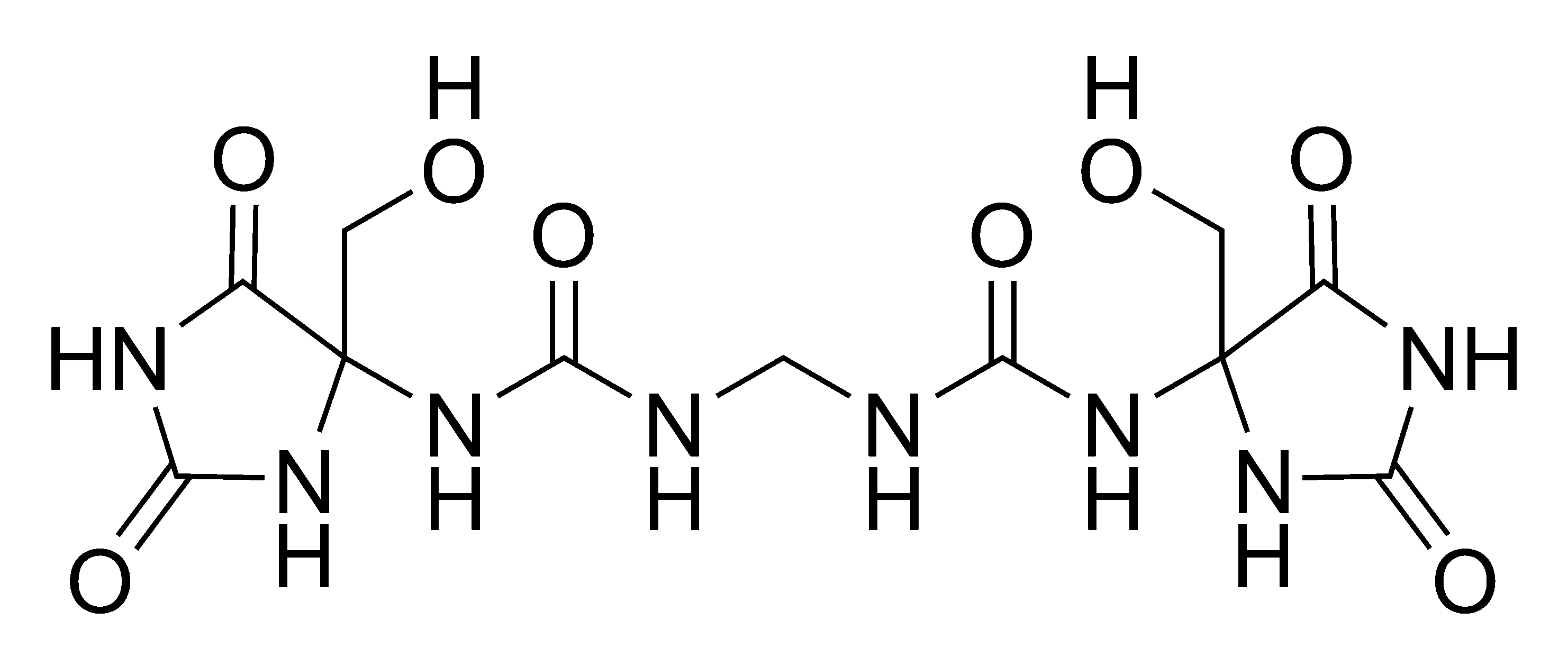

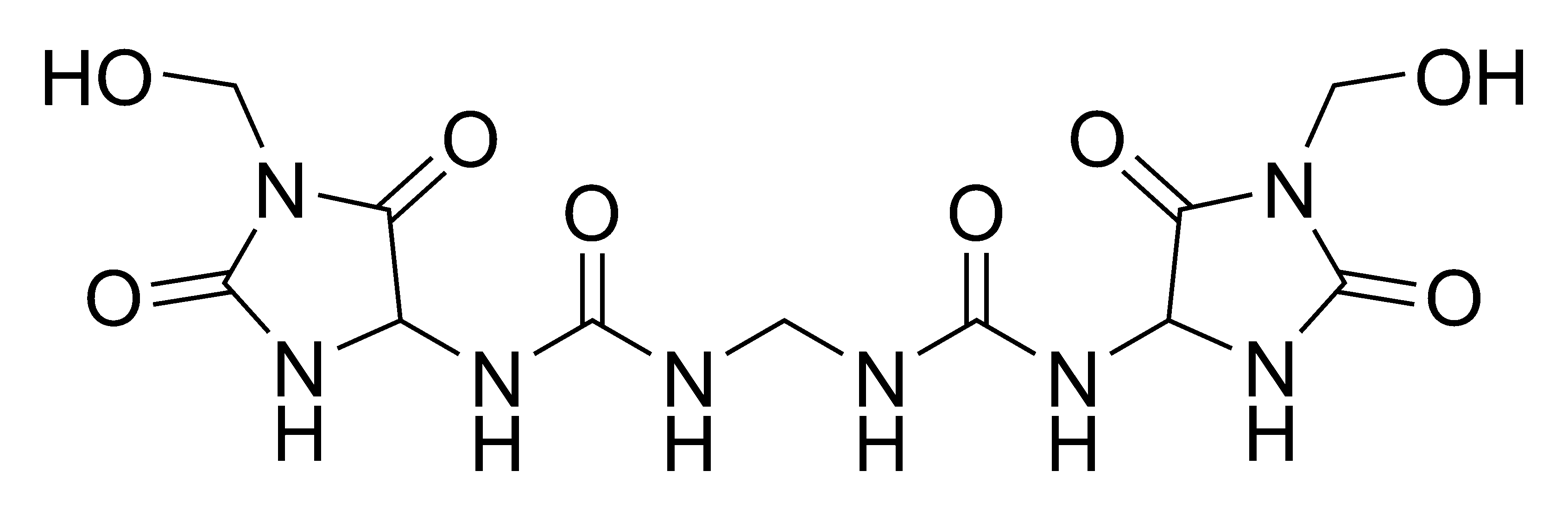

Names
- IUPAC names Correct new structure (upper pic.): 1,1′-methylenebis{3-[4-(hydroxymethyl)-2,5-dioxoimidazolidin-4-yl]urea} Erroneous old structure (lower pic.): 1,1′-methylenebis{3-[1-(hydroxymethyl)-2,5-dioxoimidazolidin-4-yl]urea}
- Other names Imidurea, Germall 115; N′,N″-methylenebis[3-[1-(hydroxymethyl)- 2,5-dioxoimidazolidin-4-yl]urea]; 1-[1-(hydroxymethyl)-2,5-dioxoimidazolidin-4-yl]- 3-[[[1-(hydroxymethyl)-2,5-dioxoimidazolidin-4-yl] carbamoylamino]methyl]urea

Identifiers
CAS Number	39236-46-9 =
3D model (JSmol)	Interactive image; Interactive image
ChEBI	CHEBI:51805
ChEMBL	ChEMBL65433
ChemSpider	35067
ECHA InfoCard	100.049.411
EC Number	254-372-6
PubChem CID	38258
UNII	M629807ATL
CompTox Dashboard (EPA)	DTXSID2040151
- InChI: InChI=1S/C11H16N8O8/c20-2-18-4(6(22)16-10(18)26)14-8(24)12-1-13-9(25)15-5-7(23)17-11(27)19(5)3-21/h4-5,20-21H,1-3H2,(H2,12,14,24)(H2,13,15,25)(H,16,22,26)(H,17,23,27) Key: ZCTXEAQXZGPWFG-UHFFFAOYSA-N; InChI=1/C11H16N8O8/c20-2-18-4(6(22)16-10(18)26)14-8(24)12-1-13-9(25)15-5-7(23)17-11(27)19(5)3-21/h4-5,20-21H,1-3H2,(H2,12,14,24)(H2,13,15,25)(H,16,22,26)(H,17,23,27) Key: ZCTXEAQXZGPWFG-UHFFFAOYAS
- SMILES: O=C2N(CO)C(NC(=O)NCNC(=O)NC1C(=O)NC(=O)N1CO)C(=O)N2; C(NC(=O)NC1C(=O)NC(=O)N1CO)NC(=O)NC2C(=O)NC(=O)N2CO

Properties
Chemical formula	C_{11}H_{16}N_{8}O_{8}
Molar mass	388.29 g/mol
- Except where otherwise noted, data are given for materials in their standard state (at 25 °C [77 °F], 100 kPa). verify (what is ?) Infobox references

Imidazolidinyl urea is an antimicrobial preservative used in cosmetics. It is chemically related to diazolidinyl urea which is used in the same way. Imidazolidinyl urea acts as a formaldehyde releaser.

== Safety ==
Some people have a contact allergy to imidazolidinyl urea causing dermatitis. Such people are often also allergic to diazolidinyl urea.

== Chemistry ==
Imidazolidinyl urea was poorly characterized until recently and the single Chemical Abstracts Service structure assigned to it is probably not the major one in the commercial material. Instead, new data indicate that the hydroxymethyl functional group of each imidazolidine ring is attached to the carbon, rather than on the nitrogen atom:

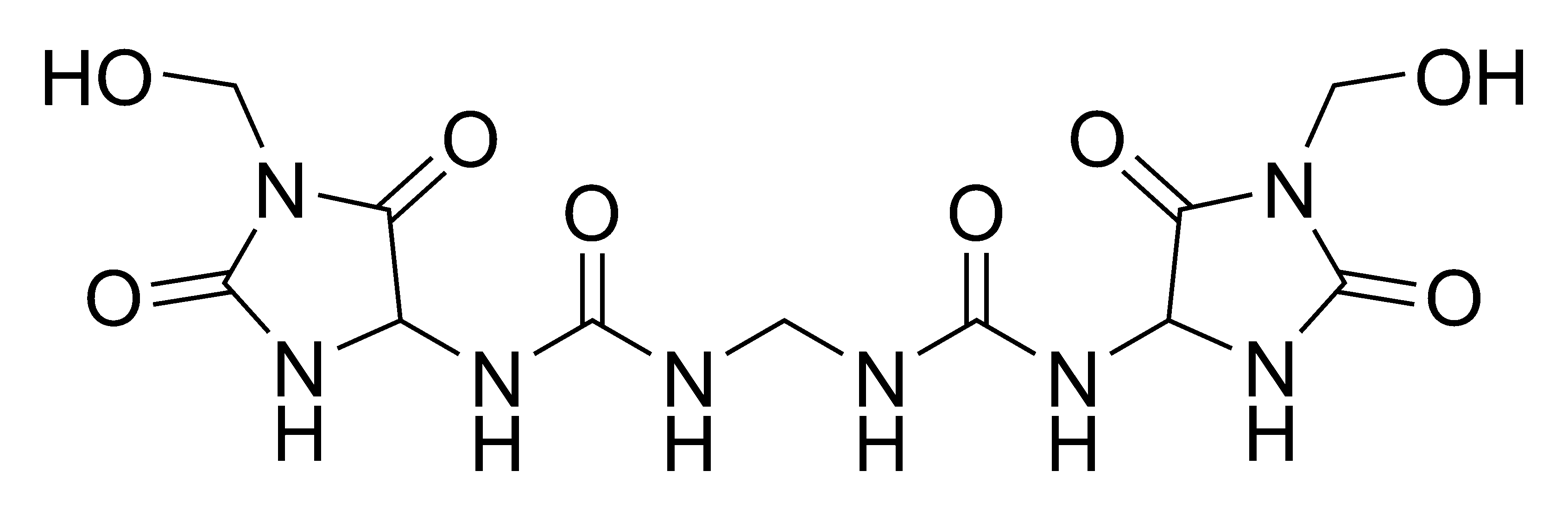
Originally reported structure

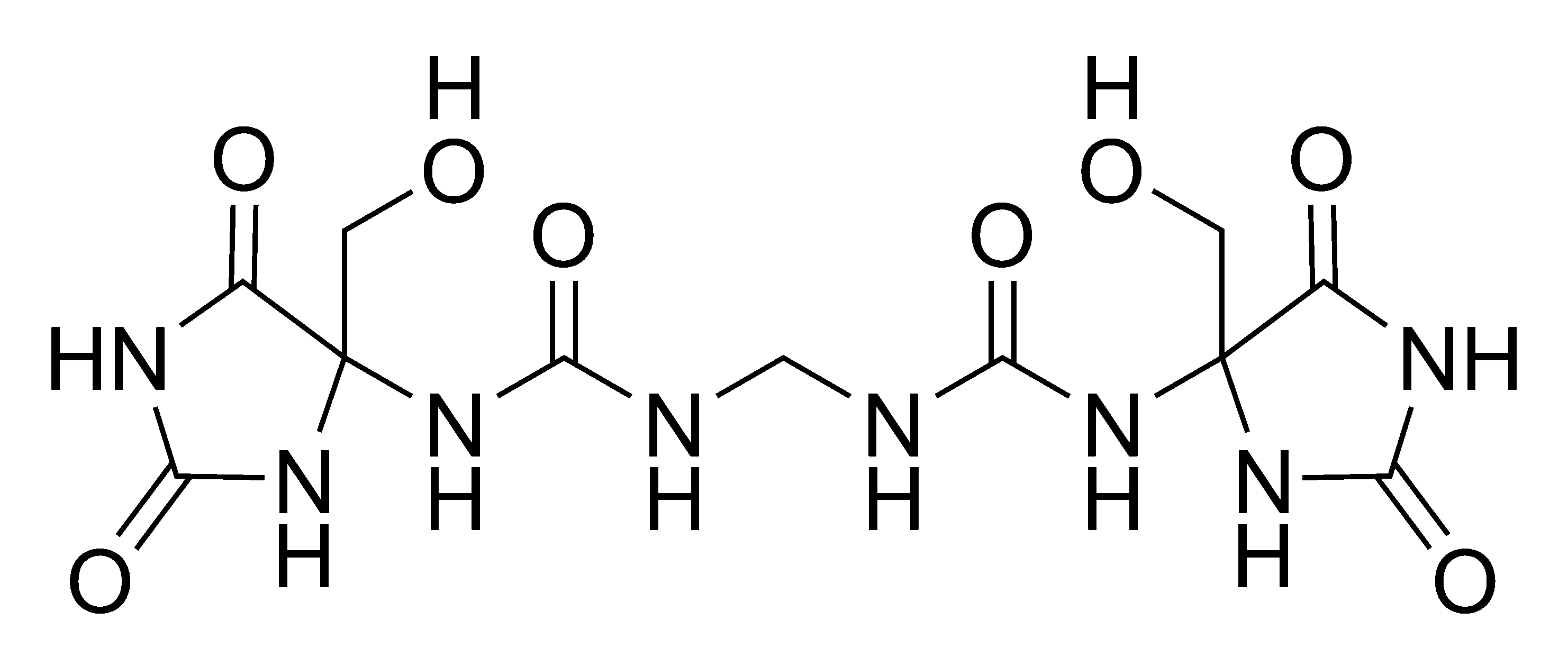
Hoeck's revised structure

=== Synthesis ===
Imidazolidinyl urea is produced by the chemical reaction of allantoin and formaldehyde in the presence of sodium hydroxide solution and heat. The reaction mixture is then neutralized with hydrochloric acid and evaporated:

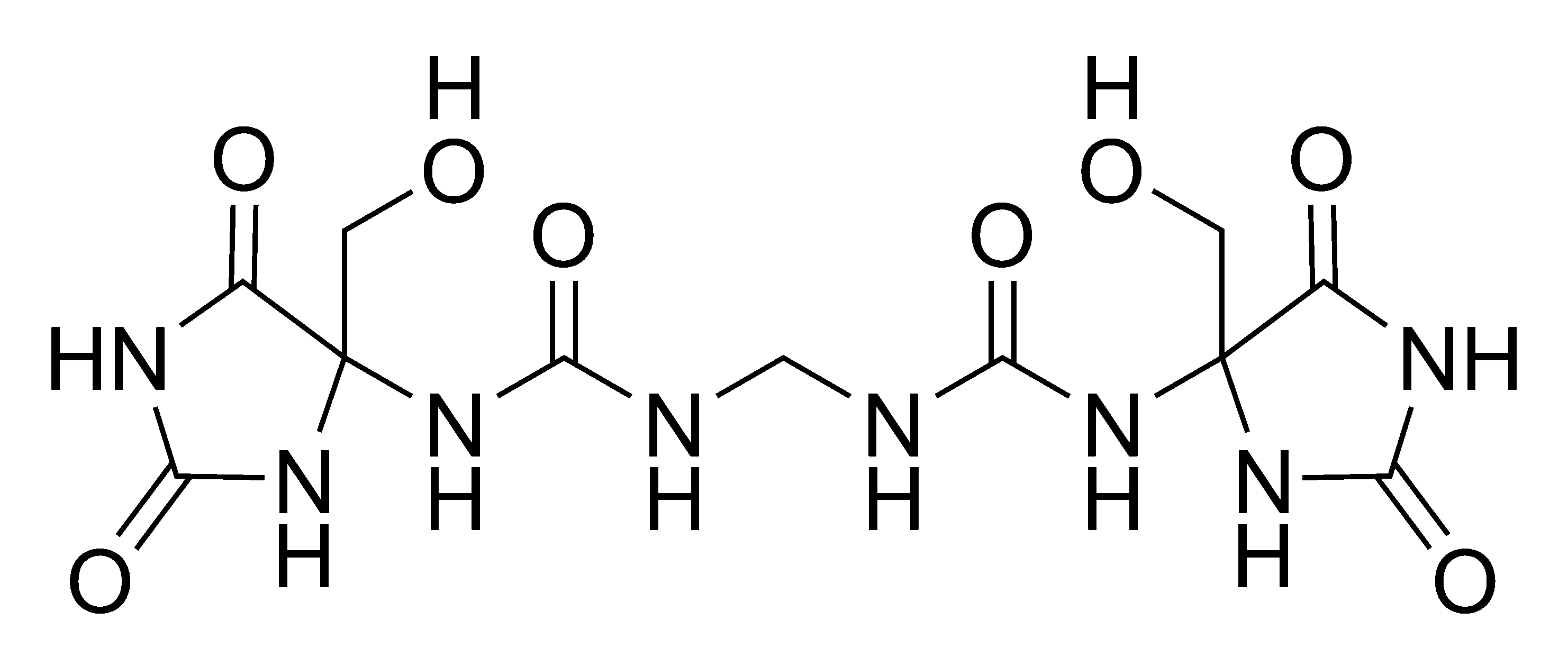
2 + 3 H_{2}C=O →

Commercial imidazolidinyl urea is a mixture of different formaldehyde addition products including polymers.
