= Imbricate alligator lizard =

There are three species of lizard named imbricate alligator lizard:

- Barisia imbricata
- Barisia ciliaris
- Barisia jonesi
