= Catalytic oxidation =

Chemical reactions with oxygen

Catalytic oxidation are processes that rely on catalysts to introduce oxygen into organic and inorganic compounds. Many applications, including the focus of this article, involve oxidation by oxygen. Such processes are conducted on a large scale for the remediation of pollutants, production of valuable chemicals, and the production of energy.

== Examples ==
Industrially important examples include both inorganic and organic substrates. Carboxylic acids, ketones, epoxides, and alcohols are often obtained by catalytic oxidation with dioxygen. These intermediates are essential to the production of consumer goods. Partial oxidation can be challenging because the most favored reaction between oxygen and hydrocarbons is combustion. Some oxidation processes install C=N bonds.

Substrate	Process	Catalyst	Product	Application
sulfur dioxide	contact process	vanadium pentoxide (heterogeneous)	sulfuric acid	fertilizer production
ammonia	Ostwald process	platinum (heterogeneous)	nitric acid	basic chemicals, TNT
hydrogen sulfide	Claus process	vanadium pentoxide (heterogeneous)	sulfur	remediation of byproduct of oil refinery
methane, ammonia	Andrussow process	platinum (heterogeneous)	hydrogen cyanide	basic chemicals, gold mining extractant
ethylene	epoxidation	mixed Ag oxides (heterogeneous)	ethylene oxide	basic chemicals, surfactants
cyclohexane	K-A process	Co and Mn salts (homogeneous)	cyclohexanol cyclohexanone	nylon precursor
ethylene	Wacker process	Pd and Cu salts (homogeneous)	acetaldehyde	basic chemicals
para-xylene	terephthalic acid synthesis	Mn and Co salts (homogeneous)	terephthalic acid	plastic precursor
propylene	allylic oxidation	Mo-oxides (heterogeneous)	acrylic acid	plastic precursor
propylene, ammonia	SOHIO process	Bi-Mo-oxides (heterogeneous)	acrylonitrile	plastic precursor
methanol	Formox process	Fe-Mo-oxides (heterogeneous)	formaldehyde	basic chemicals, alkyd resins
propylene	Sohio process	Mo-Bi-oxide (heterogeneous)	acrylonitrile	plastics
butane	Maleic anhydride process	vanadium phosphates (heterogeneous)	maleic anhydride	plastics, alkyd resins

== Catalysts ==
Oxidation catalysis is conducted by both heterogeneous catalysis and homogeneous catalysis. In the heterogeneous processes, gaseous substrate and oxygen (or air) are passed over solid catalysts. Typical catalysts are platinum, and redox-active oxides of iron, vanadium, and molybdenum. In many cases, catalysts are modified with a host of additives or promoters that enhance rates or selectivities. Carbon monoxide in automobile exhaust is converted to carbon dioxide in catalytic converters.

Important homogeneous catalysts for the oxidation of organic compounds are carboxylates of cobalt, iron, and manganese. To confer good solubility in the organic solvent, these catalysts are often derived from naphthenic acids and ethylhexanoic acid, which are highly lipophilic. These catalysts initiate radical chain reactions, autoxidation that produce organic radicals that combine with oxygen to give hydroperoxide intermediates. Generally the selectivity of oxidation is determined by bond energies. For example, benzylic C-H bonds are replaced by oxygen faster than aromatic C-H bonds.

== Fine chemicals ==
Many selective oxidation catalysts have been developed for producing fine chemicals of pharmaceutical or academic interest. Nobel Prize–winning examples are the Sharpless epoxidation and the Sharpless dihydroxylation.

== Biological catalysis ==
Partial structures for the catalytic oxidative biosynthesis of pregnanolone, a neuroprotective steroid found in the brain

Catalytic oxidations are common in biology. Broadly speaking, there are two kinds of oxidation reactions in nature. First, aerobic life subsists on energy obtained by aerobic oxidation of fats and sugars. Fatty acid oxidation and the Krebs Citric Acid Cycle are major pathways. In parallel to the commercial production fine chemical compounds, many metalloenzymes oxidize a wide variety of substrates. These processes are relevant to detoxification (discarding toxins as water-soluble derivatives) as well as biosynthesis (formation of useful oxygenate compounds such as hormones). One prevalent family of enzymes involved are cytochrome P450's.

== Fuel cells, etc ==
Fuel cells rely on oxidation of organic compounds (or hydrogen) using catalysts. Catalytic heaters generate flameless heat from a supply of combustible fuel and oxygen from air as oxidant.

== Challenges ==
Possibly the foremost challenge in catalytic oxidation is the conversion of methane to methanol. Most methane is stranded, i.e. not located near metropolitan areas. Consequently, it is flared (converted to carbon dioxide). One challenge is that methanol is more easily oxidized than is methane.

Catalytic oxidation with oxygen or air is a major application of green chemistry. There are however many oxidations that cannot be achieved so straightforwardly. The conversion of propylene to propylene oxide is typically effected using hydrogen peroxide, not oxygen or air.
