= Barisia planifrons =

Scientific classification
- Kingdom: Animalia
- Phylum: Chordata
- Class: Reptilia
- Order: Squamata
- Suborder: Anguimorpha
- Family: Anguidae
- Genus: Barisia
- Species: B. planifrons

Binomial name
- Barisia planifrons (Bocourt, 1878)

Species of lizard

The Oaxaca alligator lizard (Barisia planifrons) is a species of medium-sized lizard in the family Anguidae. The species is endemic to Mexico.
