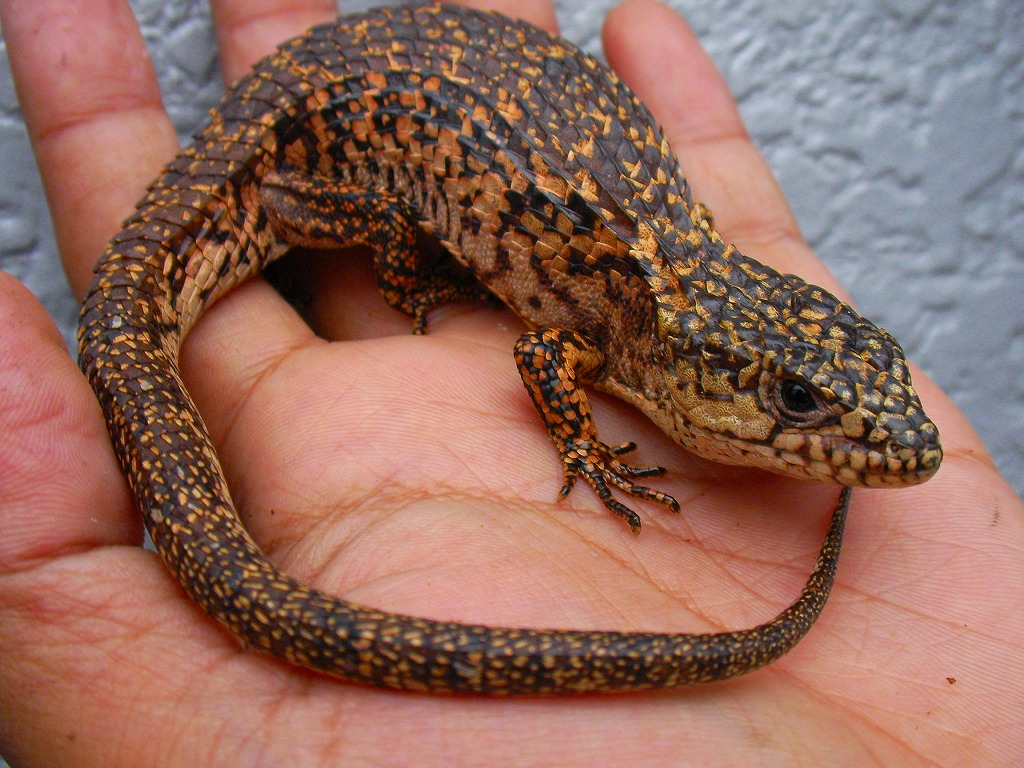

Conservation status
- Endangered (IUCN 3.1)

Scientific classification
- Kingdom: Animalia
- Phylum: Chordata
- Class: Reptilia
- Order: Squamata
- Suborder: Anguimorpha
- Family: Anguidae
- Genus: Barisia
- Species: B. rudicollis

Binomial name
- Barisia rudicollis (Wiegmann, 1828)
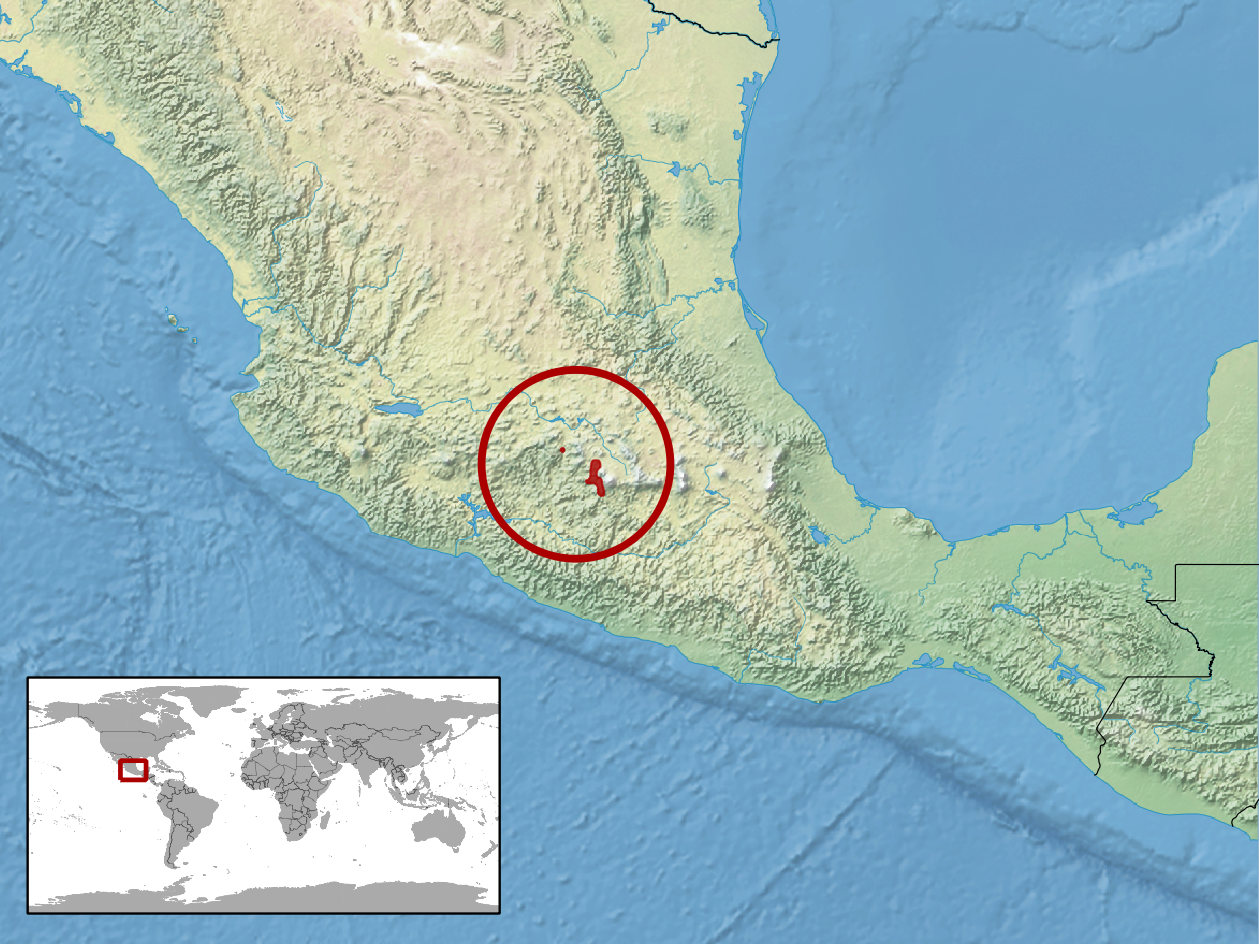

= Barisia rudicollis =

Species of lizard

The rough-necked alligator lizard (Barisia rudicollis) is a species of medium-sized lizard in the family Anguidae. The species is endemic to Mexico.
