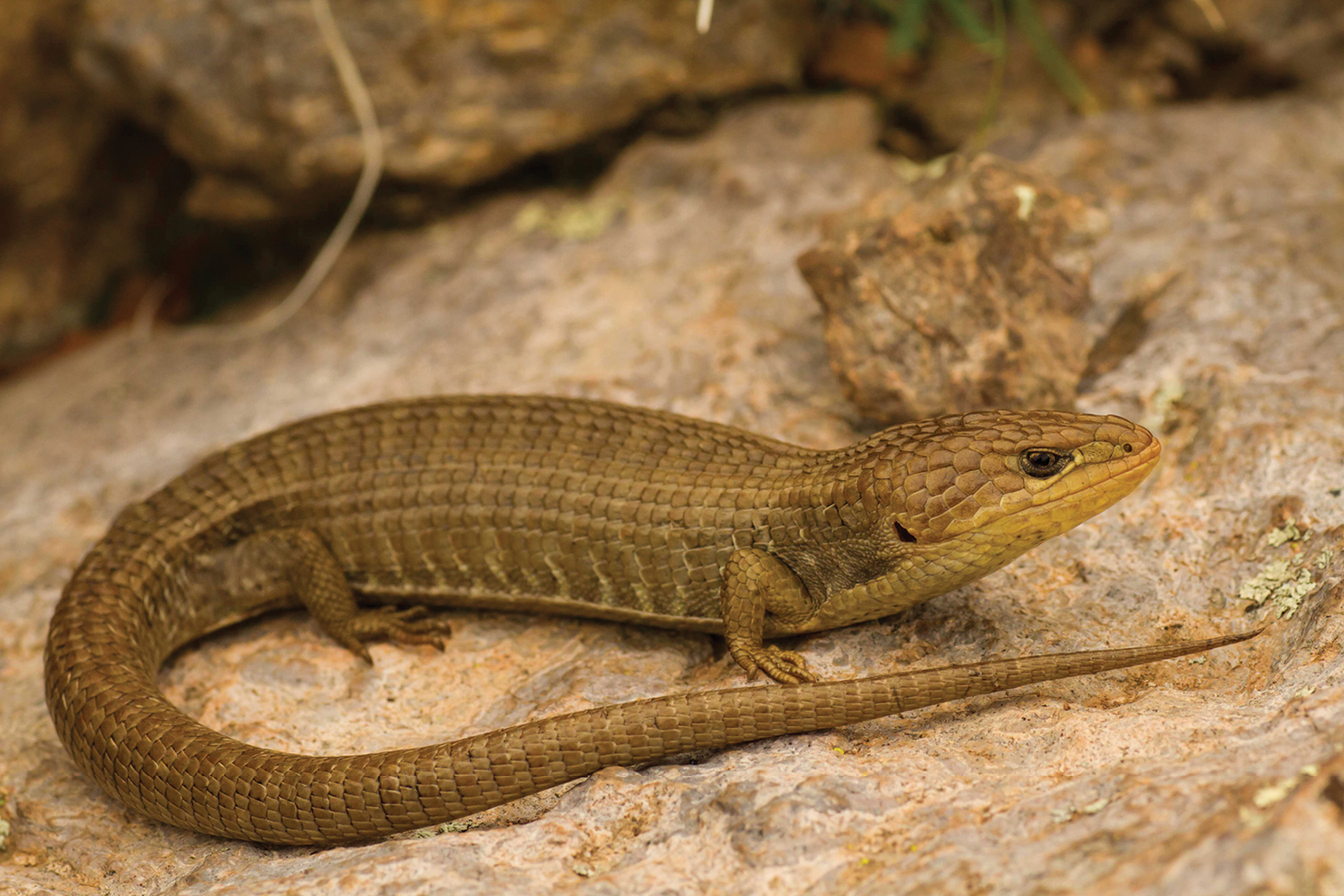
- Barisia levicollis

Scientific classification
- Kingdom: Animalia
- Phylum: Chordata
- Class: Reptilia
- Order: Squamata
- Suborder: Anguimorpha
- Family: Anguidae
- Subfamily: Gerrhonotinae
- Genus: Barisia; Gray, 1838
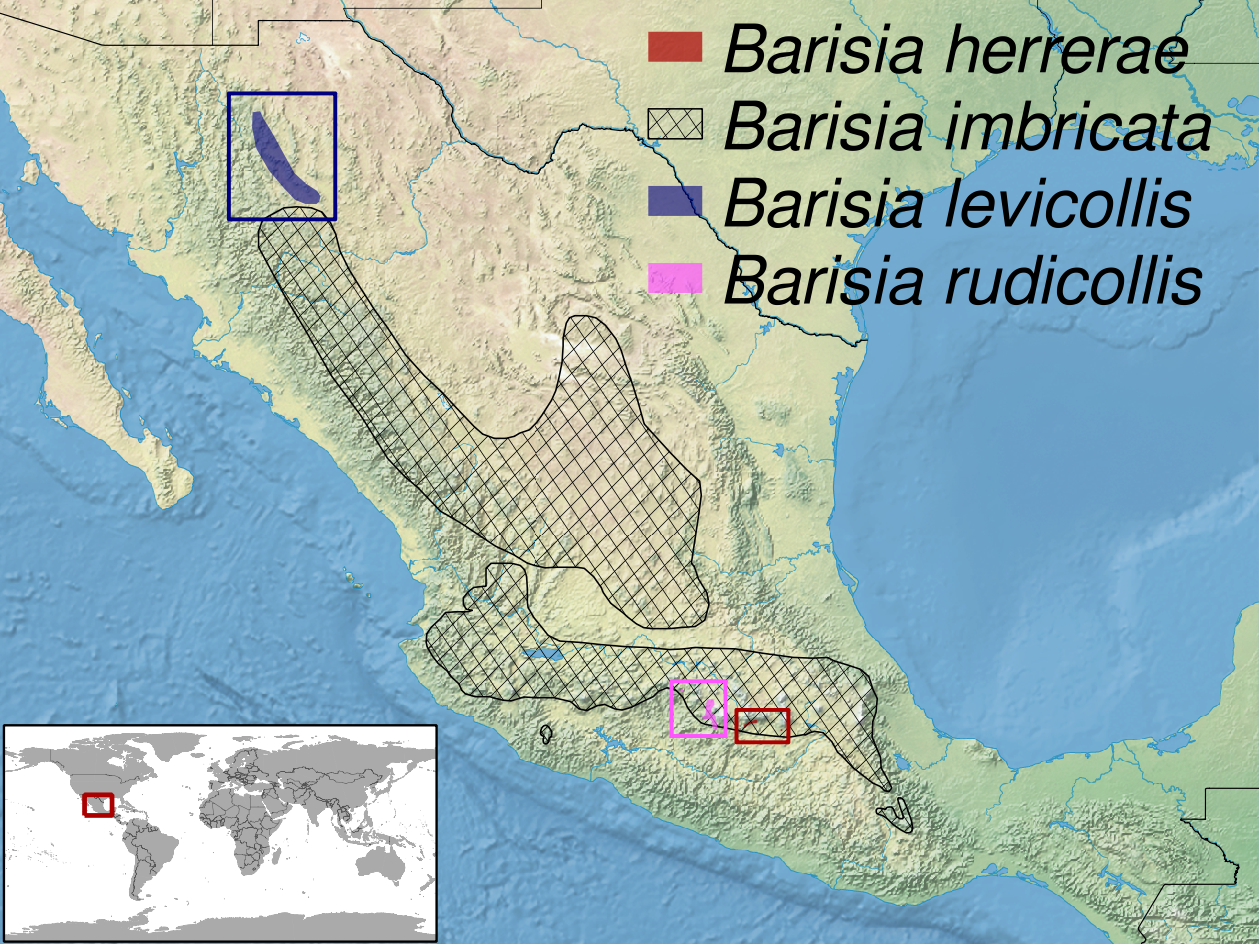

= Barisia =

Genus of lizards

Barisia is a genus of lizards in the family Anguidae. The genus is endemic to Mexico.

== Species ==
The following species are recognized as being valid.

- Barisia ciliaris (H.M. Smith, 1942) – Sierra alligator lizard, imbricate alligator lizard
- Barisia herrerae Zaldívar-Riverón & Nieto-Montes de Oca, 2002 – Herrera's alligator lizard
- Barisia imbricata (Wiegmann, 1828) – imbricate alligator lizard, transvolcanic alligator lizard
- Barisia jonesi Guillette & H.M. Smith, 1982 – imbricate alligator lizard
- Barisia levicollis Stejneger, 1890 – Chihuahuan alligator lizard
- Barisia planifrons (Bocourt, 1878) – Oaxaca alligator lizard
- Barisia rudicollis (Wiegmann, 1828) – rough-necked alligator lizard

Nota bene: A binomial authority in parentheses indicates that the species was originally described in a genus other than Barisia.
