= Barisia herrerae =

Conservation status
- Endangered (IUCN 3.1)

Scientific classification
- Kingdom: Animalia
- Phylum: Chordata
- Class: Reptilia
- Order: Squamata
- Suborder: Anguimorpha
- Family: Anguidae
- Genus: Barisia
- Species: B. herrerae

Binomial name
- Barisia herrerae Zaldívar-Riverón & Nieto-Montes de Oca, 2002
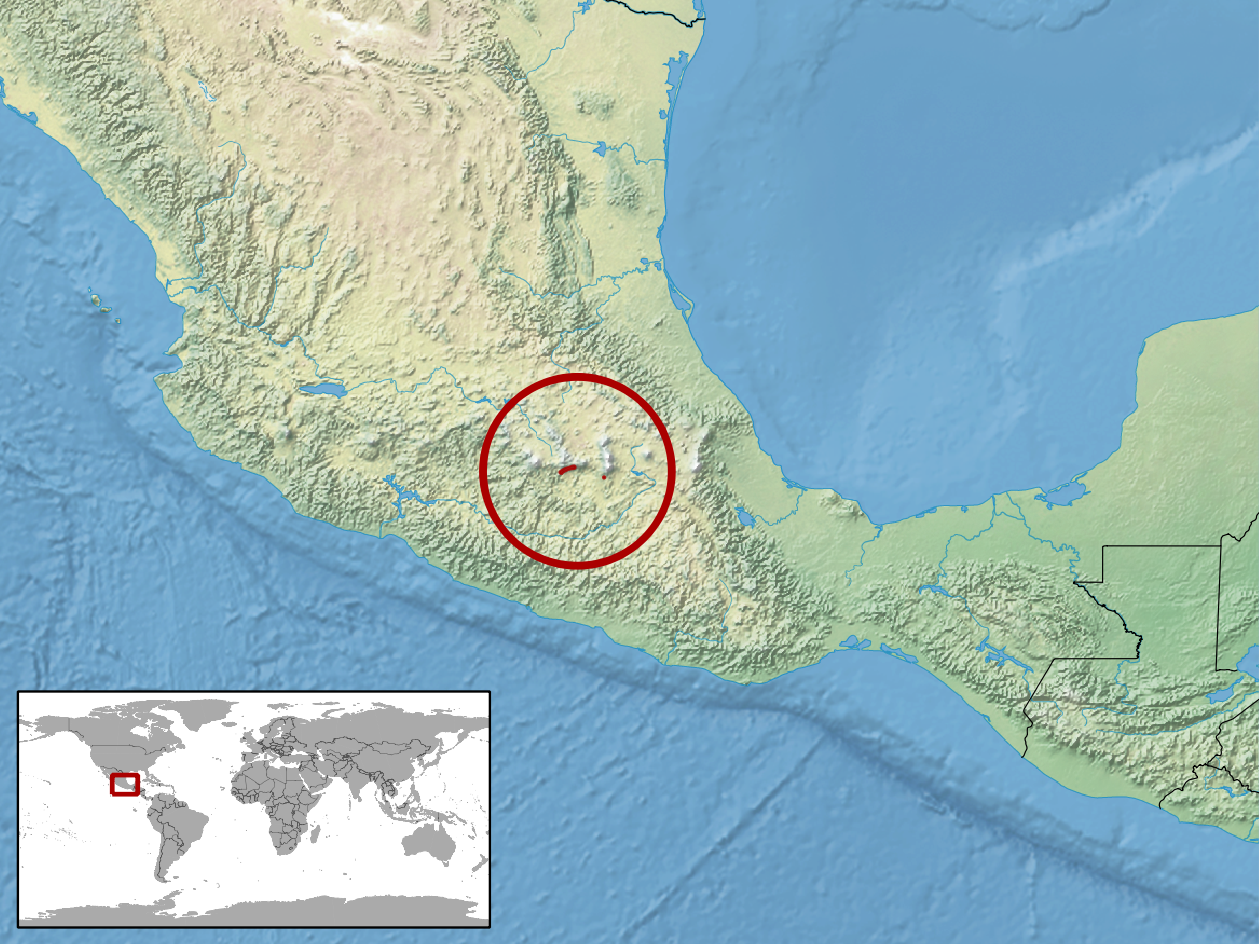

Species of lizard

Herrera's alligator lizard (Barisia herrerae) is a species of medium-sized lizard in the family Anguidae. The species is endemic to Mexico.

== Etymology ==
The specific name, herrerae, is in honor of Mexican biologist Alfonso Luis Herrera.

== Geographic range ==
B. herrerae is found in central Mexico, in the Mexican states of México and Morelos.

== Habitat ==
The preferred natural habitat of B. herrerae is forest, at altitudes of 2,350–2,500 m (7,710–8,200 ft).

== Reproduction ==
The mode of reproduction of B. herrerae has been described as viviparous and as ovoviviparous. Litter size is five to seven newborns.
