= Sulphobes =

A sulphobe is a film composed of formaldehyde and thiocyanates alleged to have lifelike properties. The name is a portmanteau of sulphur microbe. Sulphobes were a subject in the researches of Alfonso L. Herrera, a biologist who studied the origin of life.

Herrera found that the best starting material for the formation of his sulphobes was ammonium thiocyanate, which he dissolved in formaline and spread in thin layers until evaporation. It was found that these precursors gave rise to several kinds of cell-like microstructures, and to globules of coloured pigments and what Herrera described as a “proteinoid condensation product”. It was appreciated that Herrera used starting products that were abundant in the galaxy, and that he did not use polymers from living organisms to explain the formation of living organisms; this was a virtue over the coacervate theory. However, the sulphobe was also criticised for lacking properties essential to life, and for its general lack of characterisation.
