= Alfonso L. Herrera =

Mexican scientist (1868–1942)

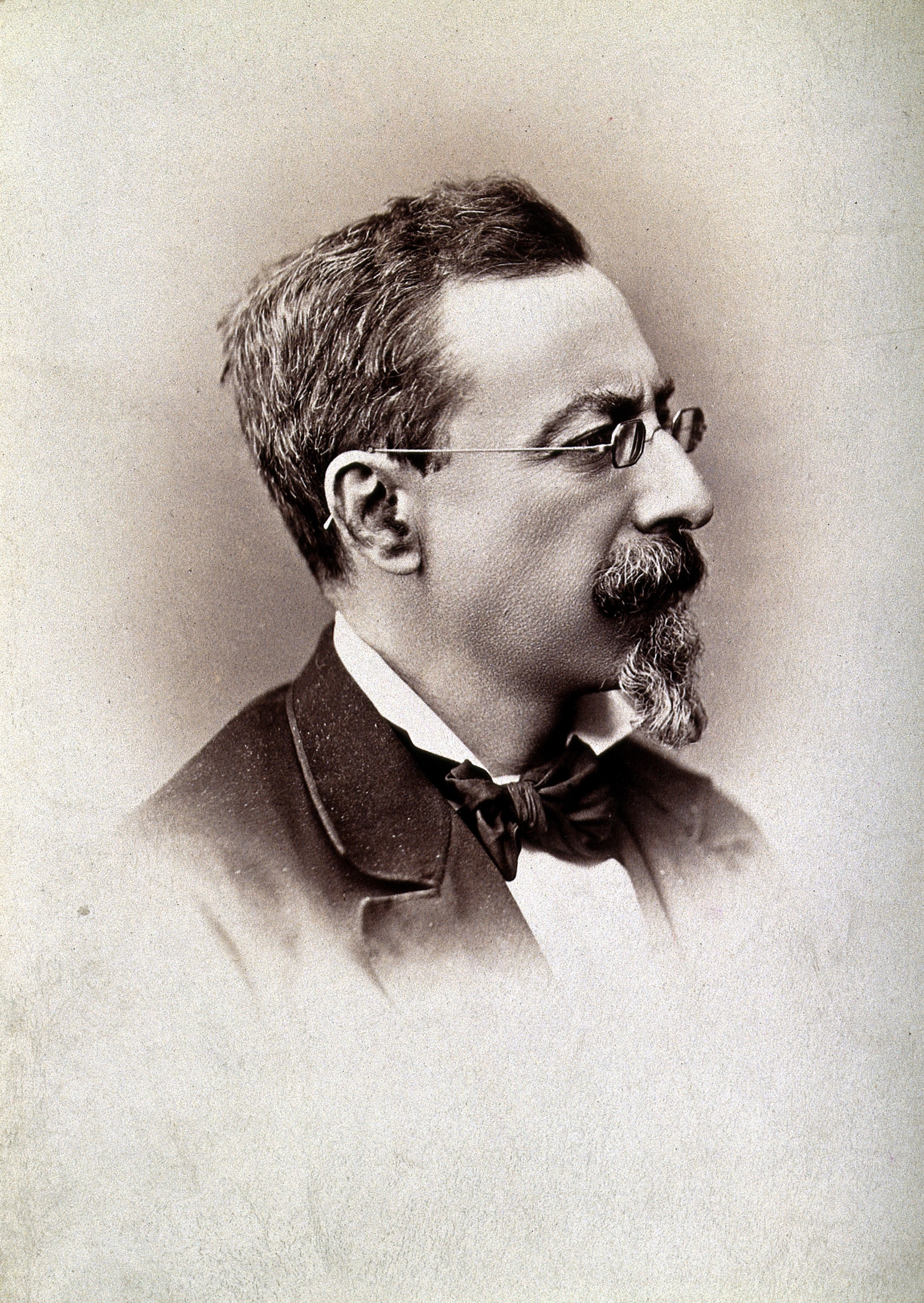
- Born: July 3, 1868; Mexico City
- Died: September 17, 1942 (aged 74); Mexico City
- Scientific career
- Fields: Biology

Alfonso Luis Herrera (1868–1942) was a Mexican biologist, author, educator and founder of several institutions in Mexico City. He conducted research into the origin of life in an attempt to develop a new, experimental science which he called plasmogeny.

== Biography ==
Herrera was born in Mexico City, the son of a well-known naturalist. He studied pharmacy at the National School of Medicine, graduating in 1889 by which time he had already published several papers in Zoology and Ornithology. He became a teacher at the National Preparatory School (Escuela Nacional Preparatoria), the Military School and the "Normal School for Teachers" (Escuela Normal para Maestros) in Mexico. He also helped to found the Botanical Garden of Chapultepec Park (1922), Mexico City Zoo (1923 – now called Chapultepec Zoo), and the Biological Institute of the University of Mexico.

Herrera died in Mexico City in 1943.

== Ideas ==
He developed an experimental science called plasmogeny, concerned with the origin of protoplasm, the living material of which all animals and plants are made. He reasoned that since life was the result of purely physico-chemical phenomena, it should be possible to create a structure with similar properties to natural protoplasm out of relatively simple organic and inorganic compounds in the laboratory. To this end he conducted experiments to create artificial cells ("protocells") using substances such as olive oil, sodium hydroxide, gasoline, and thiocyanate.

== Books ==
He published his ideas in books such as Recueil des lois de la biologie générale ("Collection of the General Laws of Biology", in French) in 1897 and Nociones de biología in 1904 which was reprinted in 1924 as Biología y plasmogenia ("Biology and Plasmogeny"). His ideas on plasmogeny were further elaborated in Una nueva ciencia – la plasmogenia ("A New Science – Plasmogeny", 1924) and a shorter version followed in 1932, La plasmogenia – nueva ciencia del origen de la vida ("Plasmogeny – The New Science of the Origin of Life"). His experiments were published in two scientific journals which he founded: Gaceta de Plasmogenia (in Spanish) and Bulletin du Laboratoire de Plasmogenie (in French). He also wrote a number of other scientific texts.

Several of his books have now appeared in English translation.

== Eponyms ==
Three reptiles are named in his honor: Kinosternon herrerai (Herrera's mud turtle), Barisia herrerae (Herrera's alligator lizard), and Lampropeltis zonata herrerae (Todos Santos Island kingsnake).

== See also ==
- Sulphobes
