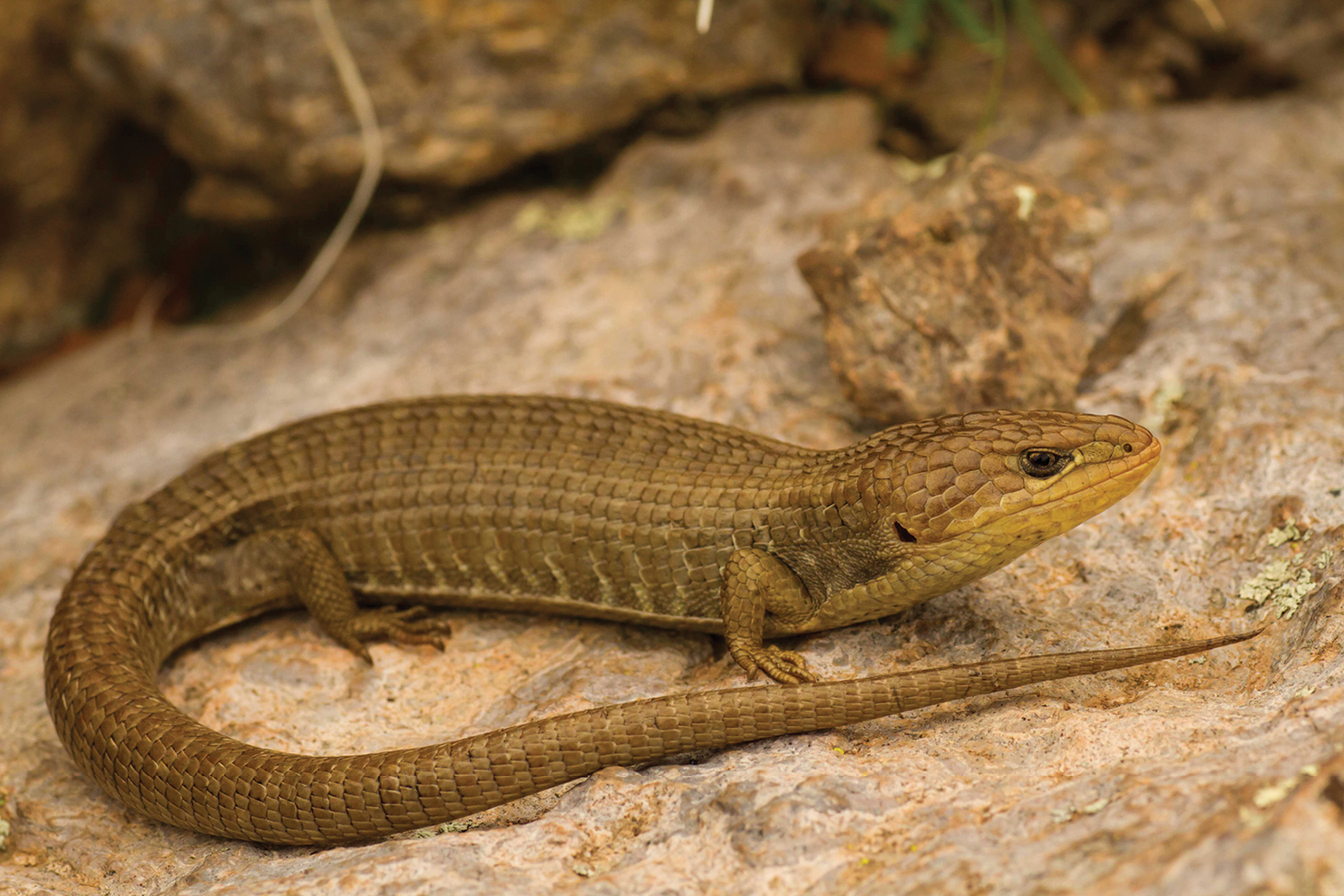

Conservation status
- Data Deficient (IUCN 3.1)

Scientific classification
- Kingdom: Animalia
- Phylum: Chordata
- Class: Reptilia
- Order: Squamata
- Suborder: Anguimorpha
- Family: Anguidae
- Genus: Barisia
- Species: B. levicollis

Binomial name
- Barisia levicollis Stejneger, 1890
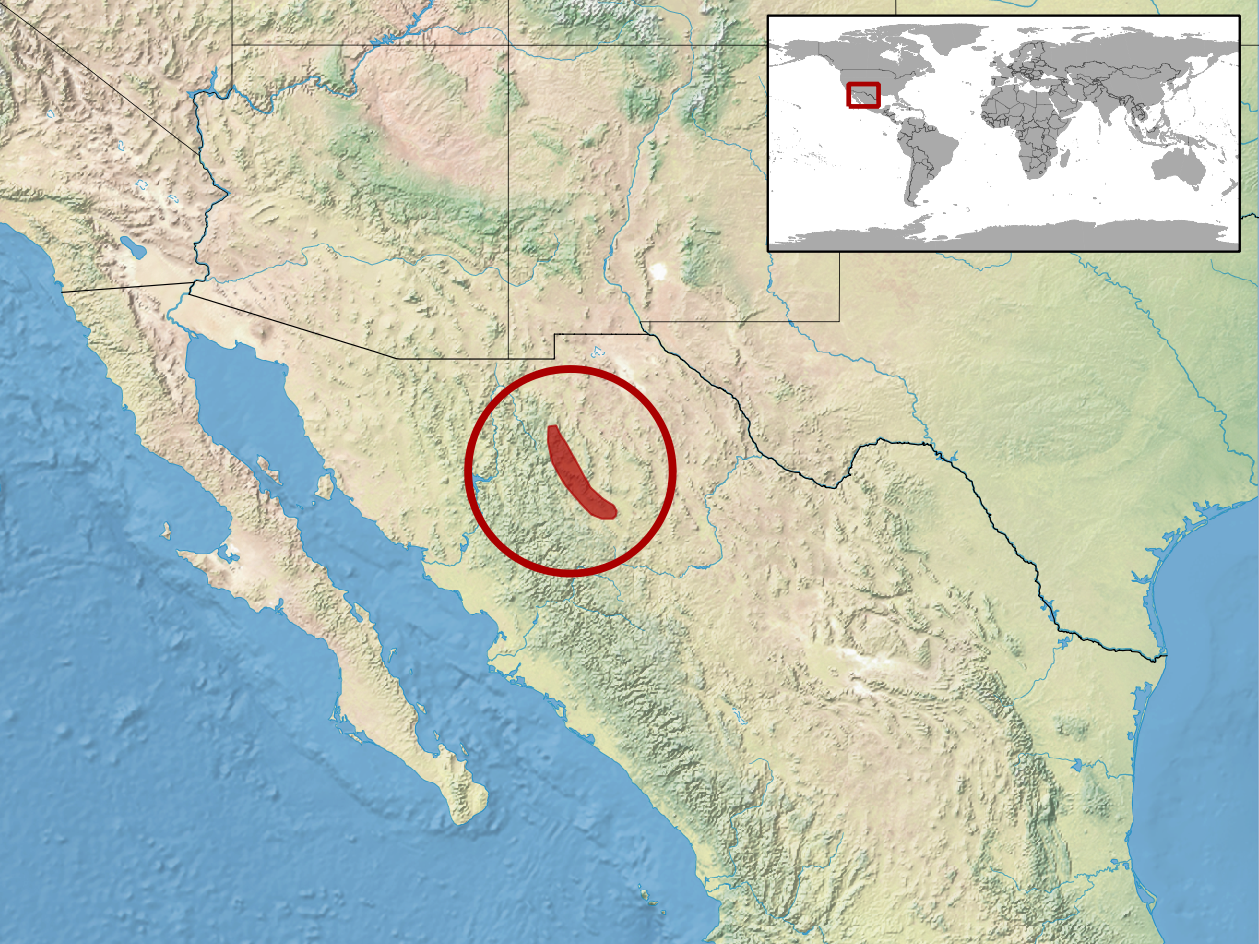

Synonyms
- Barissia levicollis [sic] Stejneger, 1890; Gerrhonotus imbricatus levicollis Dunn, 1936; Gerrhonotus levicollis H.M. Smith, 1942; Barisia levicollis Tihen, 1949

= Barisia levicollis =

Species of lizard

Barisia levicollis, also known commonly as the Chihuahuan alligator lizard and el escorpión de Chihuhua in Mexican Spanish, is a species of medium-sized lizard in the family Anguidae. The species is endemic to Mexico.

== Geographic range ==
B. levicollis is found in the Mexican state of Chihuahua.

== Habitat ==
The preferred natural habitat of B. levicollis is forest, at altitudes of 2,400–3,110 m (7,870–10,200 ft).

== Behavior ==
B. levicollis is terrestrial.

== Reproduction ==
B. levicollis is ovoviviparous.
