= Formaldehyde =

Organic compound (H–CHO); simplest aldehyde; tissue preservation fluid

Structural formula of formaldehyde (with hydrogens)
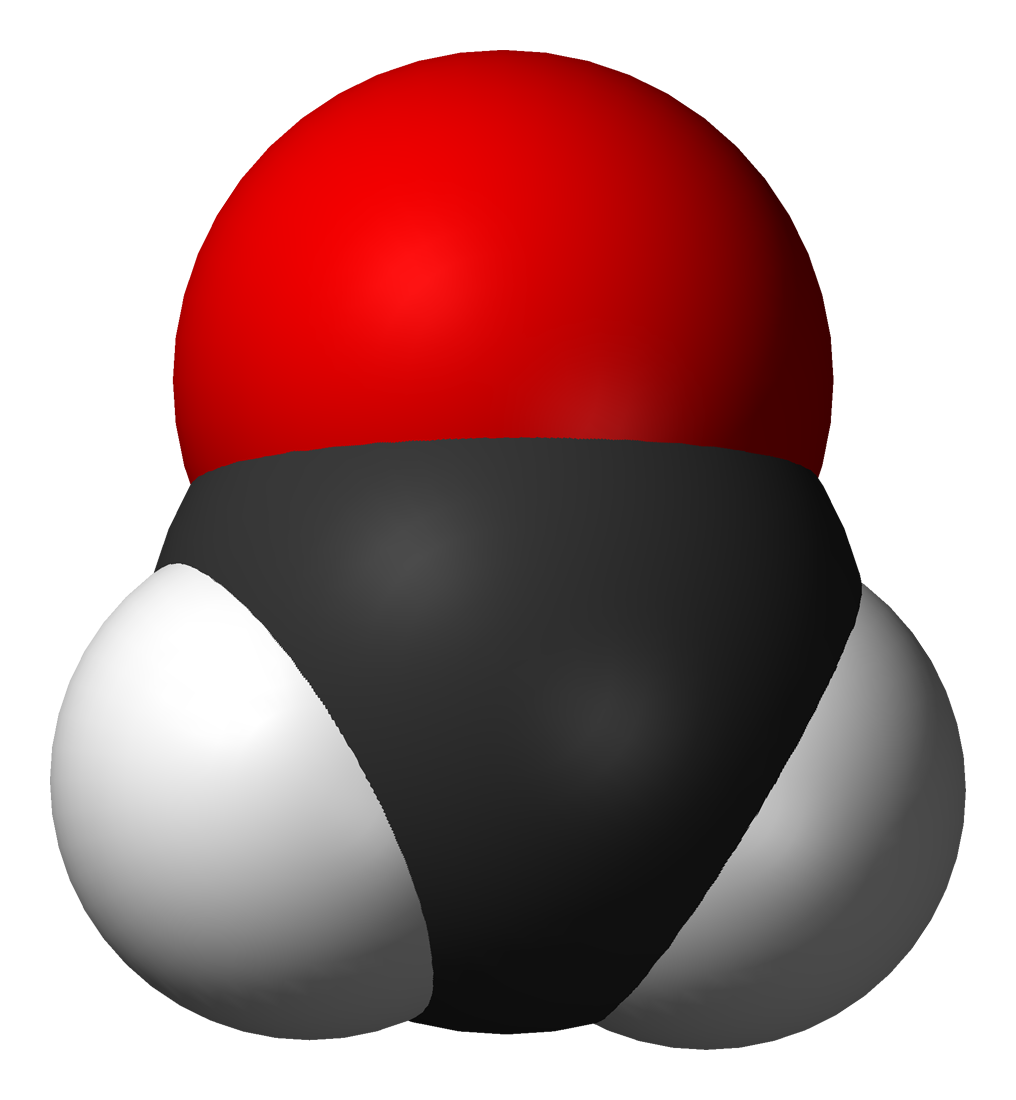
Spacefill model of formaldehyde
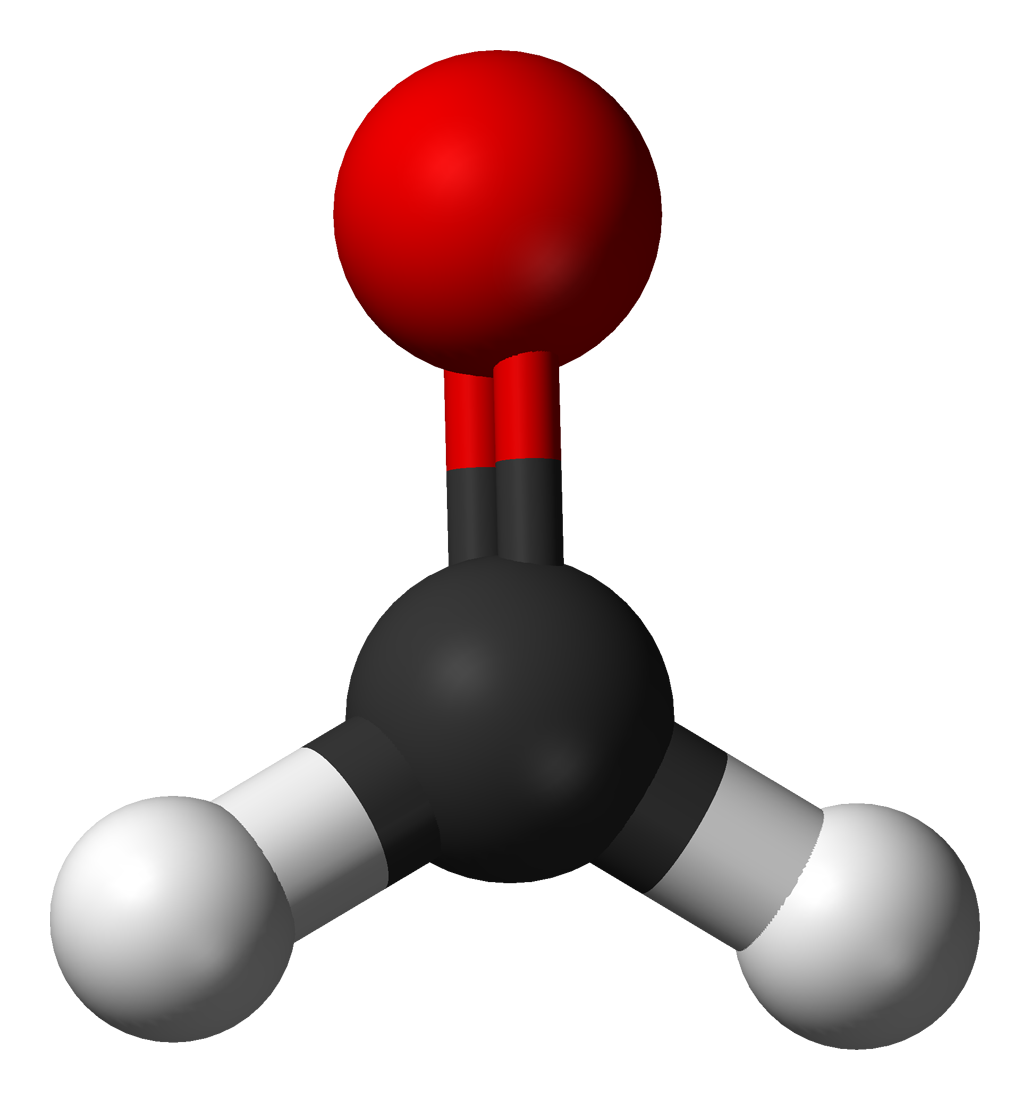
- Ball and stick model of formaldehyde

Names
- Preferred IUPAC name Formaldehyde
- Systematic IUPAC name Methanal
- Other names: Methyl aldehyde; Methylene glycol (diol forms in aqueous solution); Methylene oxide; Formalin (aqueous solution); Formol; Carbonyl hydride; Methanone; Oxomethane; Formic aldehyde

Identifiers
CAS Number	50-00-0
3D model (JSmol)	Interactive image
Beilstein Reference	1209228
ChEBI	CHEBI:16842
ChEMBL	ChEMBL1255
ChemSpider	692
DrugBank	DB03843
ECHA InfoCard	100.000.002
EC Number	200-001-8
E number	E240 (preservatives)
Gmelin Reference	445
IUPHAR/BPS	4196
KEGG	D00017
MeSH	Formaldehyde
PubChem CID	712
RTECS number	LP8925000
UNII	1HG84L3525
UN number	2209
CompTox Dashboard (EPA)	DTXSID7020637
- InChI: InChI=1S/CH2O/c1-2/h1H2 Key: WSFSSNUMVMOOMR-UHFFFAOYSA-N; InChI=1/CH2O/c1-2/h1H2 Key: WSFSSNUMVMOOMR-UHFFFAOYAT
- SMILES: C=O

Properties
Chemical formula	CH_{2}O
Molar mass	30.026 g·mol^{−1}
Appearance	Colorless gas
Density	0.8153 g/cm^{3} (−20 °C) (liquid)
Melting point	−92 °C (−134 °F; 181 K)
Boiling point	−19 °C (−2 °F; 254 K)
Solubility in water	400 g/L
log P	0.350
Vapor pressure	> 1 atm
Acidity (pK_{a})	13.27 (hydrate)
Magnetic susceptibility (χ)	−18.6·10^{−6} cm^{3}/mol
Dipole moment	2.330 D

Structure
Point group	C_{2v}
Molecular shape	Trigonal planar

Thermochemistry
Heat capacity (C)	35.387 J·mol^{−1}·K^{−1}
Std molar entropy (S^{⦵}_{298})	218.760 J·mol^{−1}·K^{−1}
Std enthalpy of formation (Δ_{f}H^{⦵}_{298})	−108.700 kJ·mol^{−1}
Gibbs free energy (Δ_{f}G^{⦵})	−102.667 kJ·mol^{−1}
Std enthalpy of combustion (Δ_{c}H^{⦵}_{298})	571 kJ·mol^{−1}

Pharmacology
ATCvet code	QP53AX19 (WHO)

Hazards
- GHS labelling
Pictograms	(GHS06: Toxic) (GHS05: Corrosive) (GHS08: Health hazard)
Signal word	Danger
Hazard statements	H301+H311+H331, H314, H317, H335, H341, H350, H370
Precautionary statements	P201, P280, P303+P361+P353, P304+P340+P310, P305+P351+P338, P308+P310
NFPA 704 (fire diamond)	3 4 0 COR
Flash point	64 °C (147 °F; 337 K)
Autoignition temperature	430 °C (806 °F; 703 K)
Explosive limits	7–73%
- Lethal dose or concentration (LD, LC)
LD_{50} (median dose)	100 mg/kg (oral, rat)
LC_{50} (median concentration)	333 ppm (mouse, 2 h); 815 ppm (rat, 30 min)
LC_{Lo} (lowest published)	333 ppm (cat, 2 h)
- NIOSH (US health exposure limits)
PEL (Permissible)	TWA 0.75 ppm ST 2 ppm (as formaldehyde and formalin)
REL (Recommended)	Ca TWA 0.016 ppm C 0.1 ppm [15-minute]
IDLH (Immediate danger)	Ca [20 ppm]
Safety data sheet (SDS)	MSDS(Archived)

Related compounds
Related aldehydes	Acetaldehyde
Related compounds	Methanol; Formic acid; Methylene imine; Thioformaldehyde
- Except where otherwise noted, data are given for materials in their standard state (at 25 °C [77 °F], 100 kPa). verify (what is ?) Infobox references

Formaldehyde (/fɔːrˈmældɪhaɪd/ for-MAL-di-hide, US also /fər-/ fər-) (systematic name methanal) is a pungent colorless gas mainly used in the production of industrial resins, such as for particle board, coatings, plastics, pulp, paper, synthetic fibers, and textiles. A ~5% solution in water of formaldehyde is used as a disinfectant and fumigant in industrial, agricultural, and healthcare settings, and a ~37% solution is used to preserve tissue samples in labs. In 2024, the global production of formaldehyde was estimated at 26 million tons per year, and is a precursor to many other materials and chemical compounds.

It is an organic compound with the chemical formula CH_{2}O and structure H_{2}C=O. The gas spontaneously polymerizes into paraformaldehyde. It is stored as a ~37% aqueous solution known as formalin, which consists mainly of the hydrate CH_{2}(OH)_{2}. It is the simplest of the aldehydes (R−CHO).

Formaldehyde also occurs naturally. It is derived from the degradation of serine, dimethylglycine, and lipids. Demethylases act by converting N-methyl groups to formaldehyde.

Formaldehyde is classified as a group 1 carcinogen (Note: Formaldehyde is classified as a carcinogen, according to the Environmental Protection Agency, International Agency for Research on Cancer (IARC), and U.S. National Toxicology Program.) and can cause respiratory and skin irritation upon exposure.

== Forms ==
Formaldehyde is more complex than most carbon compounds in that it takes several forms at normal temperatures. These compounds can often be used interchangeably and can be interconverted.

- Molecular formaldehyde. A colorless gas with a characteristic sweetish-pungent irritating odor. It is stable at about 150 °C, but polymerizes when condensed to a liquid.
- 1,3,5-Trioxane, with the formula (CH_{2}O)_{3}. It is a white solid that dissolves without degrading in organic solvents. It is a trimer of molecular formaldehyde.
- Paraformaldehyde, with the formula HO(CH_{2}O)_{n}H. It is a white solid that is insoluble in most solvents. It slowly releases monomeric formaldehyde at room temperature.
- Methanediol, with the formula CH_{2}(OH)_{2}. This compound also exists in equilibrium with various oligomers (short polymers), depending on the concentration and temperature. A saturated water solution, of about 40% formaldehyde by volume or 37% by mass, is called "100% formalin".

A small amount of stabilizer, such as methanol, is usually added to suppress oxidation and polymerization. A typical commercial-grade formalin may contain 10–12% methanol as well as metallic impurities.

"Formaldehyde" was first used as a generic trademark in 1893 following a previous trade name, "formalin".

Main forms of formaldehyde

Monomeric formaldehyde (subject of this article)

Trioxane is a stable cyclic trimer of formaldehyde.

Paraformaldehyde is a common form of formaldehyde for industrial applications.

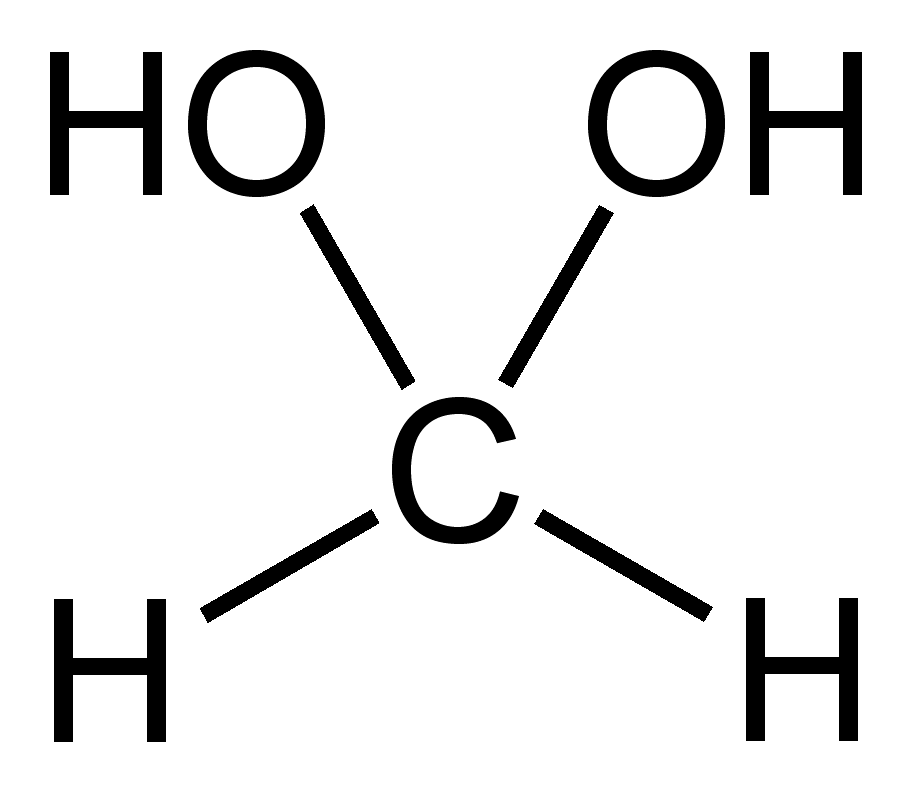
Methanediol, the predominant species in dilute aqueous solutions of formaldehyde

=== Structure and bonding ===
The formaldehyde molecule is Y-shaped and its molecular symmetry belongs to the C_{2v} point group. The precise molecular geometry of gaseous formaldehyde has been determined by gas electron diffraction and microwave spectroscopy. The bond lengths are 1.21 Å for the carbon–oxygen bond and around 1.11 Å for the carbon–hydrogen bond, while the H–C–H bond angle is 117°, close to the 120° angle found in an ideal trigonal planar molecule. Some excited electronic states of formaldehyde are pyramidal rather than planar as in the ground state.

== Occurrence ==
=== Atmospheric ===
==== Sources ====
Formaldehyde (HCHO) enters the atmosphere via primary emission and secondary formation. Primary sources of atmospheric HCHO include direct biogenic emissions from vegetation and biomass burning, and anthropogenic emissions from vehicles, industrial activities, and coal combustion. Most atmospheric HCHO is secondary, produced by radical-driven oxidation of methane (CH_{4}) and non-methane volatile organic compounds (VOCs) rather than direct emissions. Secondary production from CH_{4} oxidation dominates in remote and marine environments. Oxidation of biogenic and anthropogenic VOCs is the main source of HCHO in continental regions. Vegetation emits large amounts of isoprene, which is a key natural precursor of tropospheric formaldehyde over land.

==== Role in atmospheric chemistry ====
As a short-lived but very reactive carbonyl compound, HCHO is important in the oxidation chemistry of the troposphere. It is a key source of odd-hydrogen radicals (HO_{x} = OH + HO_{2}) that help to sustain the atmosphere's oxidative capacity. It is also an important ozone precursor.

HCHO removal in the troposphere occurs primarily via photodissociation, through two main pathways: molecular and radical-forming channels, the threshold wavelengths for which are given in parentheses:

Molecular: HCHO + hν → H_{2} + CO (λ < 360 nm)
Radical: HCHO + hν → H + HCO (λ < 330 nm)

The H and HCO radicals react with the atmospheric O_{2} to form hydroperoxyl (HO_{2}) radicals, giving a net radical channel of:

HCHO + hν + 2O_{2} → 2HO_{2} + CO

Also, in the presence of NO_{x} and sunlight, HCHO contributes to tropospheric ozone formation, which is a key component of photochemical smog.

HCHO + hν + 2O_{2} → H_{2}O + CO + O_{3}

==== Remote monitoring ====
Spectrometers on earth-observation satellites allow monitoring of formaldehyde in the troposphere. Using ultraviolet–visible spectroscopy, instruments detect absorption features in sunlight reflected by the Earth and use differential optical absorption spectroscopy to calculate vertical column densities. Near-global maps of tropospheric HCHO with daily coverage and kilometer-scale spatial resolution come from the OMI instrument on Aura, the GOME-2 instrument on MetOp, and the newer TROPOMI sensor on Sentinel-5P. Regional maps with hourly coverage over North America are available from the TEMPO instrument on Intelsat 40e.

The close coupling between isoprene and formaldehyde has been widely used in top-down approaches that derive regional and global isoprene emissions from satellite measurements of tropospheric formaldehyde columns. These studies provide important constraints on the magnitude and spatial pattern of biogenic isoprene emissions.

Processes in the upper atmosphere contribute more than 80% of the total formaldehyde in the environment. Formaldehyde is an intermediate in the oxidation (or combustion) of methane and other carbon compounds from sources such as forest fires, automobile exhaust, and tobacco smoke. When produced in the atmosphere by the action of sunlight and oxygen on atmospheric methane and other hydrocarbons, it becomes part of smog. Formaldehyde has also been detected in outer space.

=== Environmental exposure ===
Formaldehyde and its adducts are ubiquitous in nature. Food may contain formaldehyde at levels 1–100 mg/kg. Formaldehyde, formed in the metabolism of the amino acids serine and threonine, is found in the bloodstream of humans and other primates at concentrations of approximately 50 micromolar. Even in animals that were deliberately exposed to formaldehyde, most formaldehyde-DNA adducts found in non-respiratory tissues derive from endogenously produced formaldehyde.

Formaldehyde does not accumulate in the environment. It is broken down within a few hours by sunlight or by bacteria in soil or water. Humans metabolize formaldehyde quickly, converting it to formic acid. It nonetheless presents significant health concerns as a contaminant.

=== Interstellar formaldehyde ===
Formaldehyde appears to be a useful probe in astrochemistry due to prominence of the 1_{10}←1_{11} and 2_{11}←2_{12} K-doublet transitions. It was the first polyatomic organic molecule detected in the interstellar medium. Since its initial detection in 1969, it has been observed in many regions of the galaxy. Because of the widespread interest in interstellar formaldehyde, it has been extensively studied, yielding new extragalactic sources. A proposed mechanism for the formation is the hydrogenation of CO ice:

H + CO → HCO
HCO + H → CH_{2}O

HCN, HNC, H_{2}CO, and dust have also been observed inside the comae of comets C/2012 F6 (Lemmon) and C/2012 S1 (ISON).

== Synthesis and industrial production ==
=== Laboratory synthesis ===
Formaldehyde was discovered in 1859 by the Russian chemist Aleksandr Butlerov (1828–1886) when he tried to synthesize methanediol ("methylene glycol") from iodomethane and silver oxalate. In his paper, Butlerov called formaldehyde "dioxymethylen" (methylene dioxide) because his empirical formula for it was incorrect, as atomic weights were not precisely determined until the Karlsruhe Congress.

August Wilhelm von Hofmann first identified the compound as an aldehyde. He announced its production by passing methanol vapor in air over hot platinum wire. With modifications, Hofmann's method remains the basis of the modern industrial route.

Solution routes to formaldehyde also entail oxidation of methanol or iodomethane.

=== Industry ===
Formaldehyde is produced industrially by the catalytic oxidation of methanol. The most common catalysts are silver metal (i.e. the FASIL process), iron(III) oxide, iron molybdenum oxides (e.g. iron(III) molybdate) with a molybdenum-enriched surface, or vanadium oxides. In the commonly used formox process, methanol and oxygen react at c. 250–400 °C in presence of iron oxide in combination with molybdenum or vanadium to produce formaldehyde according to the chemical equation

2 CH_{3}OH + O_{2} → 2 CH_{2}O + 2 H_{2}O

The silver-based catalyst usually operates at a higher temperature, about 650 °C. Two chemical reactions on it simultaneously produce formaldehyde: that shown above and the dehydrogenation reaction

CH_{3}OH → CH_{2}O + H_{2}

In principle, formaldehyde could be generated by oxidation of methane, but this route is not industrially viable because the methanol is more easily oxidized than methane.

== Biochemistry ==
Formaldehyde is produced via several enzyme-catalyzed routes. Living beings, including humans, produce formaldehyde as part of their metabolism. Formaldehyde is key to several bodily functions (e.g. epigenetics), but its amount must also be tightly controlled to avoid self-poisoning.

- Serine hydroxymethyltransferase can decompose serine into formaldehyde and glycine, according to the reaction HOCH_{2}CH(NH_{2})CO_{2}H → CH_{2}O + H_{2}C(NH_{2})CO_{2}H.
- Methylotrophic microbes convert methanol into formaldehyde and energy via methanol dehydrogenase: `CH_{3}OH → CH_{2}O + 2e^{−} + 2H^{+}
- Other routes to formaldehyde include oxidative demethylations, semicarbazide-sensitive amine oxidases, dimethylglycine dehydrogenases, lipid peroxidases, P450 oxidases, and N-methyl group demethylases.

Formaldehyde is catabolized by alcohol dehydrogenase ADH5 and aldehyde dehydrogenase ALDH2.

== Organic chemistry ==
Formaldehyde is a building block in the synthesis of many other compounds of specialized and industrial significance. It exhibits most of the chemical properties of other aldehydes but is more reactive.

=== Polymerization and hydration ===
Monomeric CH_{2}O is a gas and is rarely encountered in the laboratory. Aqueous formaldehyde, unlike some other small aldehydes (which need specific conditions to oligomerize through aldol condensation) oligomerizes spontaneously at a common state. The trimer 1,3,5-trioxane, (CH_{2}O)_{3}, is a typical oligomer. Many cyclic oligomers of other sizes have been isolated. Similarly, formaldehyde hydrates to give the geminal diol methanediol, which condenses further to form hydroxy-terminated oligomers HO(CH_{2}O)_{n}H. The polymer is called paraformaldehyde. The higher concentration of formaldehyde—the more equilibrium shifts towards polymerization. Diluting with water or increasing the solution temperature, as well as adding alcohols (such as methanol or ethanol) lowers that tendency.

Gaseous formaldehyde polymerizes at active sites on vessel walls, but the mechanism of the reaction is unknown. Small amounts of hydrogen chloride, boron trifluoride, or stannic chloride present in gaseous formaldehyde provide the catalytic effect and make the polymerization rapid.

=== Cross-linking reactions ===
Formaldehyde forms cross-links by first combining with a protein to form methylol, which loses a water molecule to form a Schiff base. The Schiff base can then react with DNA or protein to create a cross-linked product. This reaction is the basis for the most common process of chemical fixation.

=== Oxidation and reduction ===
Formaldehyde is readily oxidized by atmospheric oxygen into formic acid. For this reason, commercial formaldehyde is typically contaminated with formic acid. Formaldehyde can be hydrogenated into methanol.

In the Cannizzaro reaction, formaldehyde and base react to produce formic acid and methanol, a disproportionation reaction.

=== Hydroxymethylation and chloromethylation ===
Formaldehyde reacts with many compounds, resulting in hydroxymethylation:

X-H + CH_{2}O → X-CH_{2}OH (X = R_{2}N, RC(O)NR', SH).

The resulting hydroxymethyl derivatives typically react further. Thus, amines give hexahydro-1,3,5-triazines:

3 RNH_{2} + 3 CH_{2}O → (RNCH_{2})_{3} + 3 H_{2}O

Similarly, when combined with hydrogen sulfide, it forms trithiane:

3 CH_{2}O + 3 H_{2}S → (CH_{2}S)_{3} + 3 H_{2}O

In the presence of acids, it participates in electrophilic aromatic substitution reactions with aromatic compounds resulting in hydroxymethylated derivatives:

ArH + CH_{2}O → ArCH_{2}OH

When conducted in the presence of hydrogen chloride, the product is the chloromethyl compound, as described in the Blanc chloromethylation. If the arene is electron-rich, as in phenols, elaborate condensations ensue. With 4-substituted phenols one obtains calixarenes. Phenol results in polymers.

=== Other reactions ===
Many amino acids react with formaldehyde. Cysteine converts to thioproline.

== Uses ==
=== Industrial applications ===
Formaldehyde is a common precursor to more complex compounds and materials. In approximate order of decreasing consumption, products generated from formaldehyde include urea formaldehyde resin, melamine resin, phenol formaldehyde resin, polyoxymethylene plastics, 1,4-butanediol, and methylene diphenyl diisocyanate. The textile industry uses formaldehyde-based resins as finishers to make fabrics crease-resistant.

Two steps in formation of urea-formaldehyde resin, which is widely used in the production of particle board

When condensed with phenol, urea, or melamine, formaldehyde produces, respectively, hard thermoset phenol formaldehyde resin, urea formaldehyde resin, and melamine resin. These polymers are permanent adhesives used in plywood and carpeting. They are also foamed to make insulation, or cast into moulded products. Production of formaldehyde resins accounts for more than half of formaldehyde consumption.

Formaldehyde is also a precursor to polyfunctional alcohols such as pentaerythritol, which is used to make paints and explosives. Other formaldehyde derivatives include methylene diphenyl diisocyanate, an important component in polyurethane paints and foams, and hexamine, which is used in phenol-formaldehyde resins as well as the explosive RDX.

Condensation with acetaldehyde affords pentaerythritol, a chemical necessary in synthesizing PETN, a high explosive:

=== Niche uses ===
==== Disinfectant and biocide ====
An aqueous solution of formaldehyde can be useful as a disinfectant as it kills most bacteria and fungi (including their spores). It is used as an additive in vaccine manufacturing to inactivate toxins and pathogens. Formaldehyde releasers are used as biocides in personal care products such as cosmetics. Although present at levels not normally considered harmful, they are known to cause allergic contact dermatitis in certain sensitized individuals.

Aquarists use formaldehyde as a treatment for the parasites Ichthyophthirius multifiliis and Cryptocaryon irritans. Formaldehyde is one of the main disinfectants recommended for destroying anthrax.

Formaldehyde is also approved for use in the manufacture of animal feeds in the US. It is an antimicrobial agent used to maintain complete animal feeds or feed ingredients Salmonella negative for up to 21 days.

==== Tissue fixative and embalming agent ====
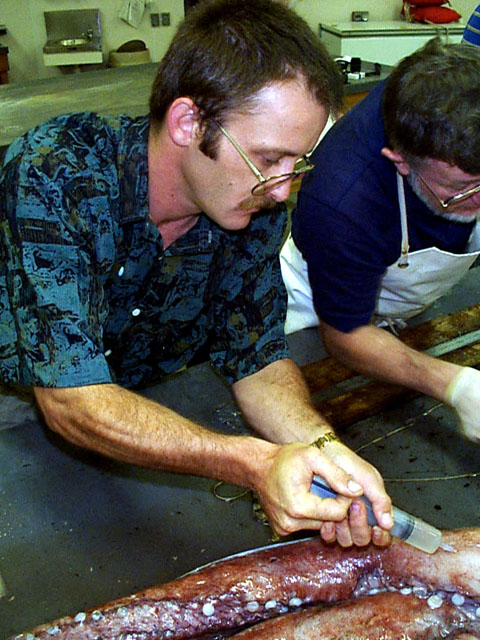
Injecting a giant squid specimen with formalin for preservation

Formaldehyde preserves or fixes tissue or cells. The process involves cross-linking of primary amino groups. The European Union has banned the use of formaldehyde as a biocide (including embalming) under the Biocidal Products Directive (98/8/EC) due to its carcinogenic properties. Countries with a strong tradition of embalming corpses, such as Ireland and other colder-weather countries, have raised concerns. Despite reports to the contrary, no decision on the inclusion of formaldehyde on Annex I of the Biocidal Products Directive for product-type 22 (embalming and taxidermist fluids) had been made as of September 2009.

Formaldehyde-based crosslinking is exploited in ChIP-on-chip or ChIP-sequencing genomics experiments, where DNA-binding proteins are cross-linked to their cognate binding sites on the chromosome and analyzed to determine what genes are regulated by the proteins. Formaldehyde is also used as a denaturing agent in RNA gel electrophoresis, preventing RNA from forming secondary structures. A solution of 4% formaldehyde fixes pathology tissue specimens at about one millimeter per hour at room temperature.

==== Drug testing ====
Formaldehyde and 18 M (concentrated) sulfuric acid makes Marquis reagent—which can identify alkaloids and other compounds.

=== Photography ===
In photography, formaldehyde is used in low concentrations for the process C-41 (color negative film) stabilizer in the final wash step, as well as in the process E-6 pre-bleach step, to make it unnecessary in the final wash. Due to improvements in dye coupler chemistry, more modern (2006 or later) E-6 and C-41 films do not need formaldehyde, as their dyes are already stable.

== Safety ==
In view of its widespread use, toxicity, and volatility, formaldehyde poses a significant danger to human health. In 2011, the US National Toxicology Program described formaldehyde as "known to be a human carcinogen".

Formaldehyde is regulated in the United States by multiple federal programs. The U.S. Occupational Safety and Health Administration (OSHA) has an 8-hour time-weighted average of 0.75 parts per million (ppm) and a 15-minute short-term exposure limit (STEL) of 2 ppm. The United States Environmental Protection Agency (EPA) regulates formaldehyde emissions from certain composite wood products under TSCA Title VI.The EPA has completed its risk evaluation for formaldehyde under the TSCA's conditions of use in January 2025 and found the chemical to be an unreasonable risk of injury to human health when used under the conditions evaluated, including under conditions of use for workers and consumers.

=== Chronic inhalation ===
Concerns are associated with chronic (long-term) exposure by inhalation as may happen from thermal or chemical decomposition of formaldehyde-based resins and the production of formaldehyde resulting from the combustion of a variety of organic compounds (for example, exhaust gases). As formaldehyde resins are used in many construction materials, it is one of the more common indoor air pollutants. At concentrations above 0.1 ppm in air, formaldehyde can irritate the eyes and mucous membranes. Formaldehyde inhaled at this concentration may cause headaches, a burning sensation in the throat, and difficulty breathing, and can trigger or aggravate asthma symptoms.

The CDC considers formaldehyde a systemic poison. Formaldehyde poisoning can permanently cause adverse changes in the nervous system's functioning, "such as increased prevalence of headache, depression, mood changes, insomnia, irritability, attention deficit, and impairment of dexterity, memory, and equilibrium".

A 1988 Canadian study of houses with urea-formaldehyde foam insulation found that formaldehyde levels as low as 0.046 ppm were positively correlated with eye and nasal irritation. A 2009 review of studies has shown a strong association between exposure to formaldehyde and the development of childhood asthma.

A theory was proposed for the carcinogenesis of formaldehyde in 1978. In 1987 the United States Environmental Protection Agency (EPA) classified it as a probable human carcinogen, and after more studies the WHO International Agency for Research on Cancer (IARC) in 1995 also classified it as a probable human carcinogen. Further information and evaluation of all known data led the IARC to reclassify formaldehyde as a known human carcinogen associated with nasal sinus cancer and nasopharyngeal cancer. Studies in 2009 and 2010 have also shown a positive correlation between exposure to formaldehyde and the development of leukemia, particularly myeloid leukemia. Nasopharyngeal and sinonasal cancers are relatively rare, with a combined annual incidence in the United States of less than 4,000 cases. About 30,000 cases of myeloid leukemia occur in the United States each year. Some evidence suggests that workplace exposure to formaldehyde contributes to sinonasal cancers. Professionals exposed to formaldehyde in their occupation, such as funeral industry workers and embalmers, showed an increased risk of leukemia and brain cancer compared with the general population. Other factors are important in determining individual risk for the development of leukemia or nasopharyngeal cancer. In yeast, formaldehyde is found to perturb pathways for DNA repair and cell cycle.

In the residential environment, formaldehyde exposure comes from a number of routes: formaldehyde can be emitted by treated wood products, such as plywood or particle board, but it is also produced by paints, varnishes, floor finishes, and cigarette smoking. In July 2016, the US EPA released a prepublication version of its final rule on Formaldehyde Emission Standards for Composite Wood Products. These new rules impact manufacturers, importers, distributors, and retailers of products containing composite wood, including fiberboard, particleboard, and various laminated products, who must comply with more stringent record-keeping and labeling requirements.

External videos
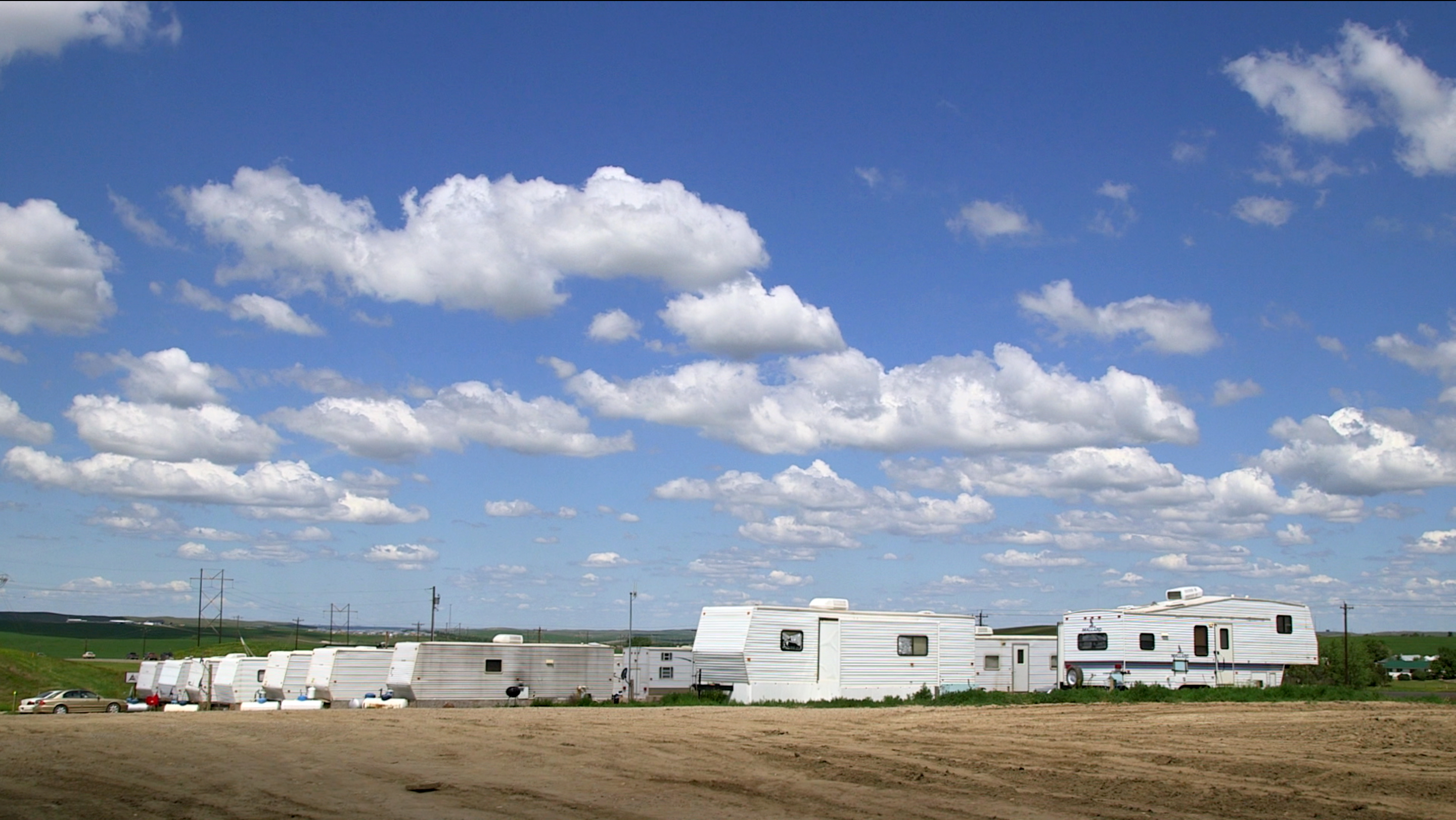
- Where Have All the Trailers Gone?, video by Mariel Carr (Videographer) & Nick Shapiro (Researcher), 2015, Science History Institute

The U.S. EPA allows no more than 0.016 ppm formaldehyde in the air in new buildings constructed for that agency. A U.S. EPA study found a new home measured 0.076 ppm when brand new and 0.045 ppm after 30 days. The Federal Emergency Management Agency (FEMA) has also announced limits on the formaldehyde levels in trailers purchased by that agency. The EPA recommends the use of "exterior-grade" pressed-wood products with phenol instead of urea resin to limit formaldehyde exposure, since pressed-wood products containing formaldehyde resins are often a significant source of formaldehyde in homes.

The eyes are most sensitive to formaldehyde exposure. The lowest level at which many people can begin to smell formaldehyde ranges between 0.05 and 1 ppm. In controlled chamber studies, people begin to sense eye irritation at about 0.5 ppm, 5 to 20 percent report eye irritation at 0.5 to 1 ppm, and greater certainty for sensory irritation occurred at 1 ppm and above. While some agencies have used a level as low as 0.1 ppm as a threshold for irritation, the expert panel found that a level of 0.3 ppm would protect against nearly all irritation. In fact, the expert panel found that a level of 1.0 ppm would avoid eye irritation—the most sensitive endpoint—in 75–95% of all people exposed.

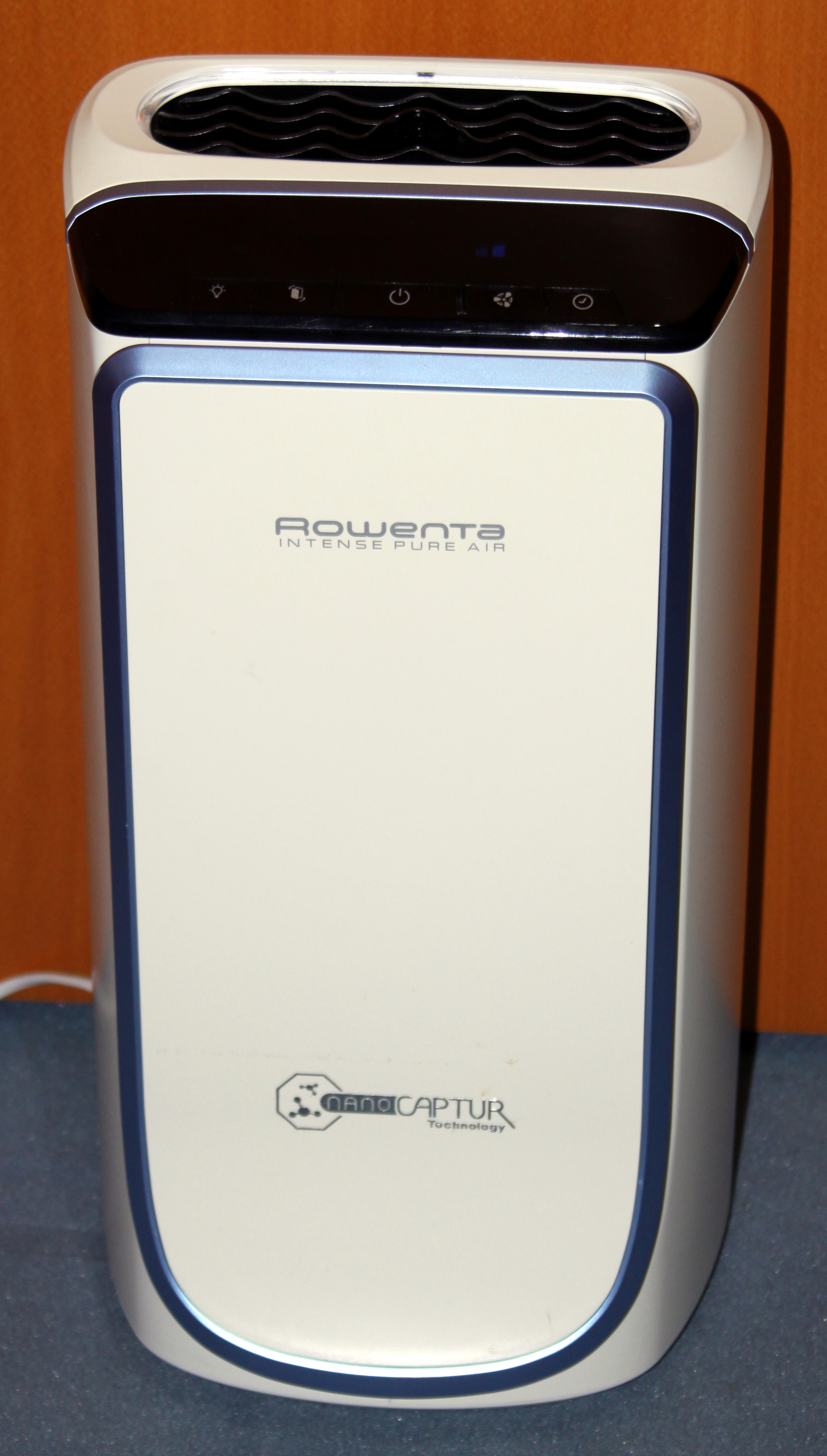
Some air purifiers include filtering technology that is supposed to lower indoor formaldehyde concentration.

Formaldehyde levels in building environments are affected by a number of factors. These include the potency of formaldehyde-emitting products present, the ratio of the surface area of emitting materials to volume of space, environmental factors, product age, interactions with other materials, and ventilation conditions. Formaldehyde emits from a variety of construction materials, furnishings, and consumer products. The three products that emit the highest concentrations are medium-density fiberboard, plywood, and particle board. Environmental factors such as temperature and relative humidity can elevate levels because formaldehyde has a high vapor pressure. Formaldehyde levels from building materials are the highest when a building first opens because materials would have less time to off-gas. Formaldehyde levels decrease over time as the sources suppress.

In operating rooms, formaldehyde is produced as a byproduct of a process known as electrosurgery and is present in surgical smoke, exposing surgeons and healthcare workers to potentially unsafe concentrations.

Formaldehyde levels in air can be sampled and tested in several ways, including impinger, treated sorbent, and passive monitors. The National Institute for Occupational Safety and Health (NIOSH) has measurement methods numbered 2016, 2541, 3500, and 3800.

In June 2011, the twelfth edition of the National Toxicology Program (NTP) Report on Carcinogens (RoC) changed the listing status of formaldehyde from "reasonably anticipated to be a human carcinogen" to "known to be a human carcinogen." Concurrently, a National Academy of Sciences (NAS) committee was convened and issued an independent review of the draft US EPA IRIS assessment of formaldehyde, providing a comprehensive health effects assessment and quantitative estimates of human risks of adverse effects.

=== Acute irritation and allergic reaction ===
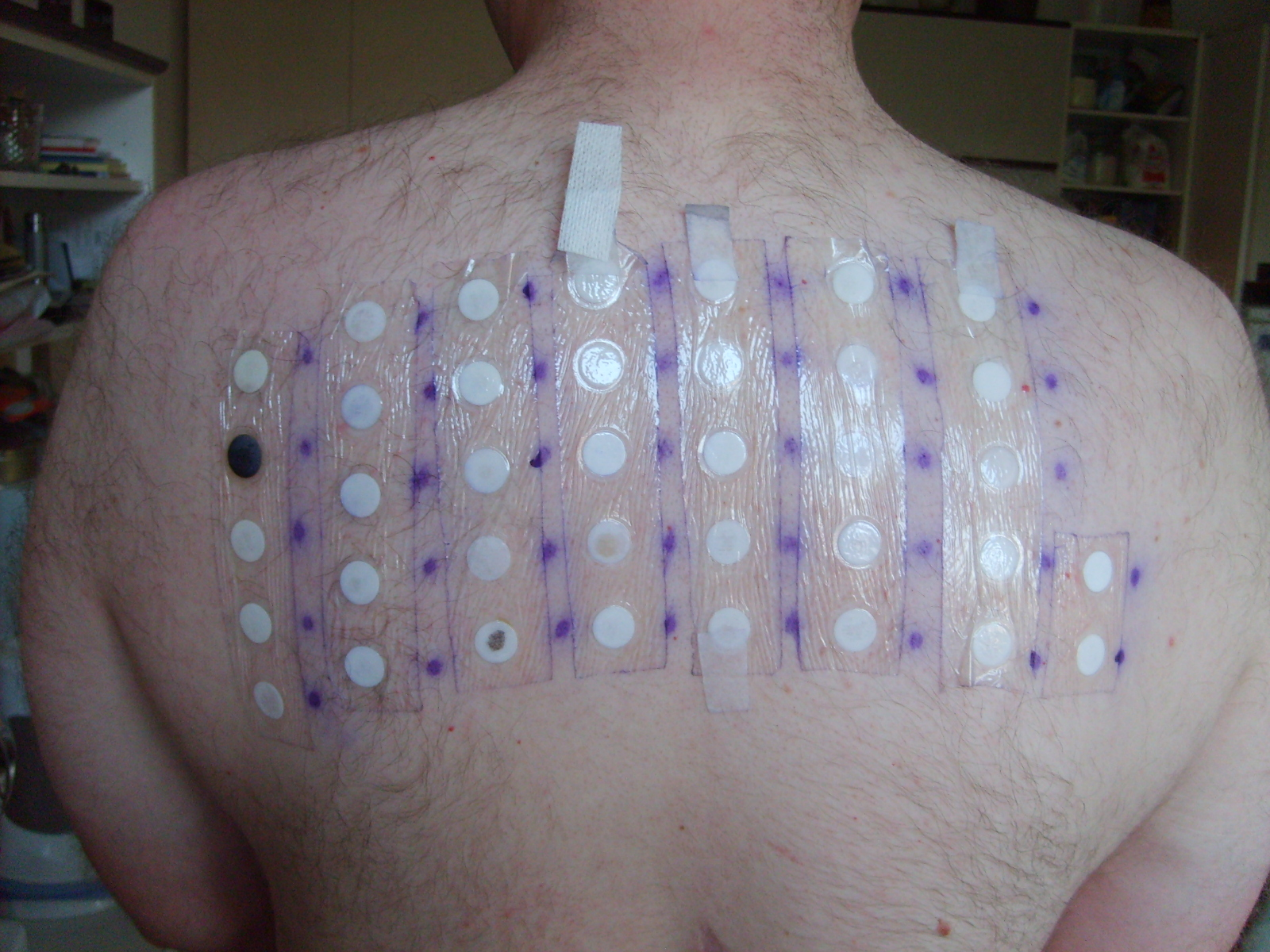
Patch test

For most people, irritation from formaldehyde is temporary and reversible, although formaldehyde can cause allergies and is part of the standard patch test series. In 2005–06, it was the seventh-most-prevalent allergen in patch tests (9.0%). People with formaldehyde allergy are advised to avoid formaldehyde releasers as well (e.g., Quaternium-15, imidazolidinyl urea, and diazolidinyl urea). People who suffer allergic reactions to formaldehyde tend to display lesions on the skin in the areas that have had direct contact with the substance, such as the neck or thighs (often due to formaldehyde released from permanent-press finished clothing) or dermatitis on the face (typically from cosmetics). Formaldehyde has been banned in cosmetics in both Sweden and Japan.

=== Other routes ===
In humans, ingestion of as little as 30 millilitres (1.0 US fl oz) of 37% formaldehyde solution can cause death. Other symptoms associated with ingesting such a solution include gastrointestinal damage (vomiting, abdominal pain), and systematic damage (dizziness). Testing for formaldehyde is by blood or urine by gas chromatography–mass spectrometry. Other methods to detect formaldehyde include infrared detection, gas detector tubes, gas detectors using electrochemical sensors, and high-performance liquid chromatography (HPLC). HPLC is the most sensitive.

The fifteenth edition (2021) of the US National Toxicology Program Report on Carcinogens notes that currently in the US, "The general population can be exposed to formaldehyde primarily from breathing indoor or outdoor air, from tobacco smoke, from use of cosmetic products containing formaldehyde, and, to a more limited extent, from ingestion of food and water." Affected water includes groundwater, surface water, and bottled water. It also notes that occupational exposure can be significant.

== Contaminant in food ==
Formaldehyde in food can be present naturally, added as an inadvertent contaminant, or intentionally added as a preservative, disinfectant, or bacteriostatic agent. Cooking and smoking food can also result in formaldehyde being produced in food. Foods that the U.S. National Toxicology Program has reported to have higher levels compared to other foods are fish, seafood, and smoked ham. It also notes that formaldehyde in food generally occurs in a bound form and that formaldehyde is unstable in an aqueous solution.

Scandals have broken in both the 2005 Indonesia food scare and 2007 Vietnam food scare regarding the addition of formaldehyde to foods to extend shelf life. In 2011, after a four-year absence, Indonesian authorities found foods with formaldehyde being sold in markets in a number of regions across the country. In August 2011, at least at two Carrefour supermarkets, the Central Jakarta Livestock and Fishery Sub-Department found cendol containing 10 parts per million of formaldehyde. In 2014, the owner of two noodle factories in Bogor, Indonesia, was arrested for using formaldehyde in noodles. Foods known to be contaminated included noodles, salted fish, and tofu. Chicken and beer were also rumored to be contaminated. In some places, such as China, manufacturers still use formaldehyde illegally as a preservative in foods, which exposes people to formaldehyde ingestion.

In 2011 in Nakhon Ratchasima, Thailand, truckloads of rotten chicken were treated with formaldehyde for sale in which "a large network", including 11 slaughterhouses run by a criminal gang, were implicated. In 2012, 1 billion rupiah (almost US$100,000) of fish imported from Pakistan to Batam, Indonesia, were found laced with formaldehyde.

Formalin contamination of foods has been reported in Bangladesh, with stores and supermarkets selling fruits, fishes, and vegetables that have been treated with formalin to keep them fresh. However, in 2015, a Formalin Control Bill was passed in the Parliament of Bangladesh with a provision of life-term imprisonment as the maximum punishment as well as a maximum fine of 2,000,000 BDT but not less than 500,000 BDT for importing, producing, or hoarding formalin without a license.

In the early 1900s, formaldehyde was frequently added by US milk plants to milk bottles as a method of pasteurization due to the lack of knowledge and concern regarding formaldehyde's toxicity.

Formaldehyde was one of the chemicals used in 19th-century industrialized food production that was investigated by Dr. Harvey W. Wiley with his famous "Poison Squad" as part of the US Department of Agriculture. This led to the 1906 Pure Food and Drug Act, a landmark event in the early history of food regulation in the United States.

== Regulation ==
Formaldehyde is banned from use in certain applications (preservatives for liquid-cooling and processing systems, slimicides, metalworking-fluid preservatives, and antifouling products) under the Biocidal Products Directive. In the EU, the maximum allowed concentration of formaldehyde in finished products is 0.2%, and any product that exceeds 0.05% has to include a warning that the product contains formaldehyde.

In the United States, Congress passed a bill July 7, 2010, regarding the use of formaldehyde in hardwood plywood, particle board, and medium-density fiberboard. The bill limited the allowable amount of formaldehyde emissions from these wood products to 0.09 ppm, and required companies to meet this standard by January 2013. The final US EPA rule specified maximum emissions of "0.05 ppm formaldehyde for hardwood plywood, 0.09 ppm formaldehyde for particleboard, 0.11 ppm formaldehyde for medium-density fiberboard, and 0.13 ppm formaldehyde for thin medium-density fiberboard."

Formaldehyde was declared a toxic substance by the 1999 Canadian Environmental Protection Act.

The FDA is proposing a ban on hair relaxers with formaldehyde due to cancer concerns.

== See also ==
- 1,3-Dioxetane
- DMDM hydantoin
- Sawdust
- Health impacts of sawdust
- Sulphobes
- Transition metal complexes of aldehydes and ketones
- Wood glue
- Wood preservation
- Phosgene
