= Fasil process =

Chemistry process

The fasil process (named from "formaldehyde silver") is an industrial method for producing formaldehyde from methanol, utilizing a silver catalyst. It is one of the two primary large-scale formaldehyde production methods, alongside the metal oxide process.

The name fasil is a registered trademark owned by Dynea AS. Dynea started to produce formaldehyde in Norway in 1947 and has developed the process since then. More than 40 fasil formaldehyde plants have been installed worldwide.

== Process description ==
Methanol, air and water is the primary feedstock for formaldehyde production. The feedstock is mixed in a vaporizer, and passed over a silver catalyst bed in an adiabatic reactor. Due to the methanol/oxygen ratio, the reaction gas mixture is above the upper flammability limit (UFL) for methanol/air mixtures and therefore inherently safe. The formaldehyde produced is separated from unreacted methanol and byproducts through absorption in water, using a selective absorber.

In the fasil process, formaldehyde is synthesized through the catalytic oxidation of methanol. The primary reactions are partial oxidation of methanol (1), and methanol dehydrogenation (2).

(1) CH_{3}OH + ½ O_{2} → CH_{2}O + H_{2}O
(2) CH_{3}OH → CH_{2}O + H_{2}

This exothermic chemical reaction is facilitated by the silver catalyst at high temperatures, typically around 600-650 °C. The excess energy from the exothermic reaction is used to generate steam by burning the hydrogen-rich tail gas in a boiler or thermal oxidizer.

The reactor used in this process is a fixed-bed heterogeneous catalytic reactor, where the process gas is quickly cooled down in a waste heat boiler to reduce byproducts from gas phase reactions. The silver catalyst in the reactor is periodically replaced, a process that can be completed within a day. The used silver is regenerated through an electrolytic process and is fully recycled.

The process gas cooling relies solely on water and steam, reducing fire risks. Additionally, all oxygen is converted in the reactor. Oxygen is therefore not present in the absorber, improving safety and the quality of the formaldehyde produced.
