= Formox process =

The Formox process produces formaldehyde. Formox is a registered trademark owned by Johnson Matthey. The process was originally invented jointly by Swedish chemical company Perstorp and Reichhold Chemicals.

Industrially, formaldehyde is produced by catalytic oxidation of methanol. The most commonly used catalysts are silver metal or a mixture of an iron oxide with molybdenum and/or vanadium. In the recently more commonly used Formox process using iron oxide and molybdenum and/or vanadium, methanol and oxygen react at 300-400°C to produce formaldehyde according to the chemical equation:

CH_{3}OH + ½ O_{2} → H_{2}CO + H_{2}O.

The silver-based catalyst (see also: the Fasil process) is usually operated at a higher temperature, about 650 °C. On it, two chemical reactions simultaneously produce formaldehyde: the one shown above, and the dehydrogenation reaction:

CH_{3}OH → H_{2}CO + H_{2}

Further oxidation of the formaldehyde product during its production usually gives formic acid that is found in formaldehyde solution, found in parts per million values.
