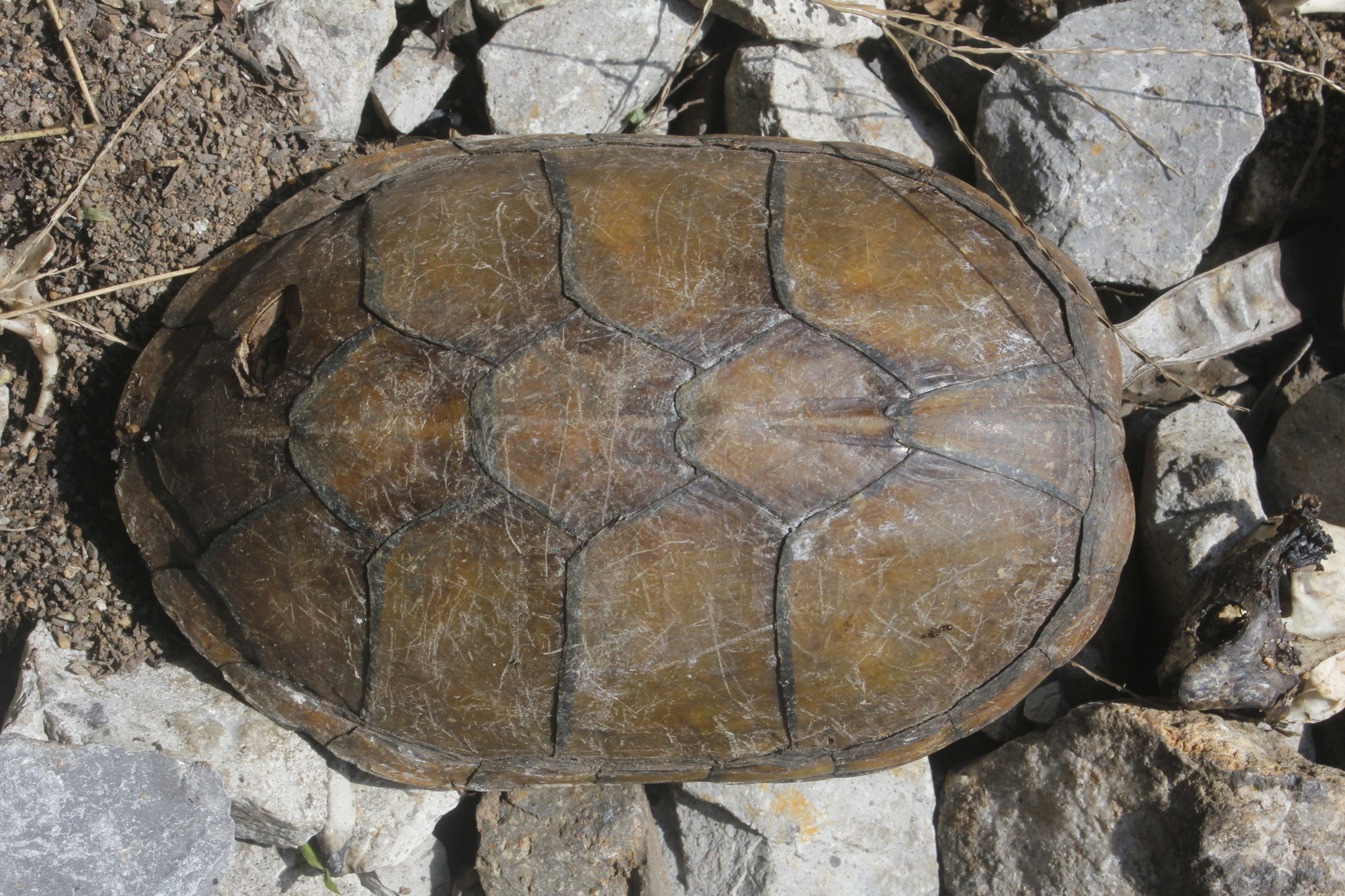
- Carapace
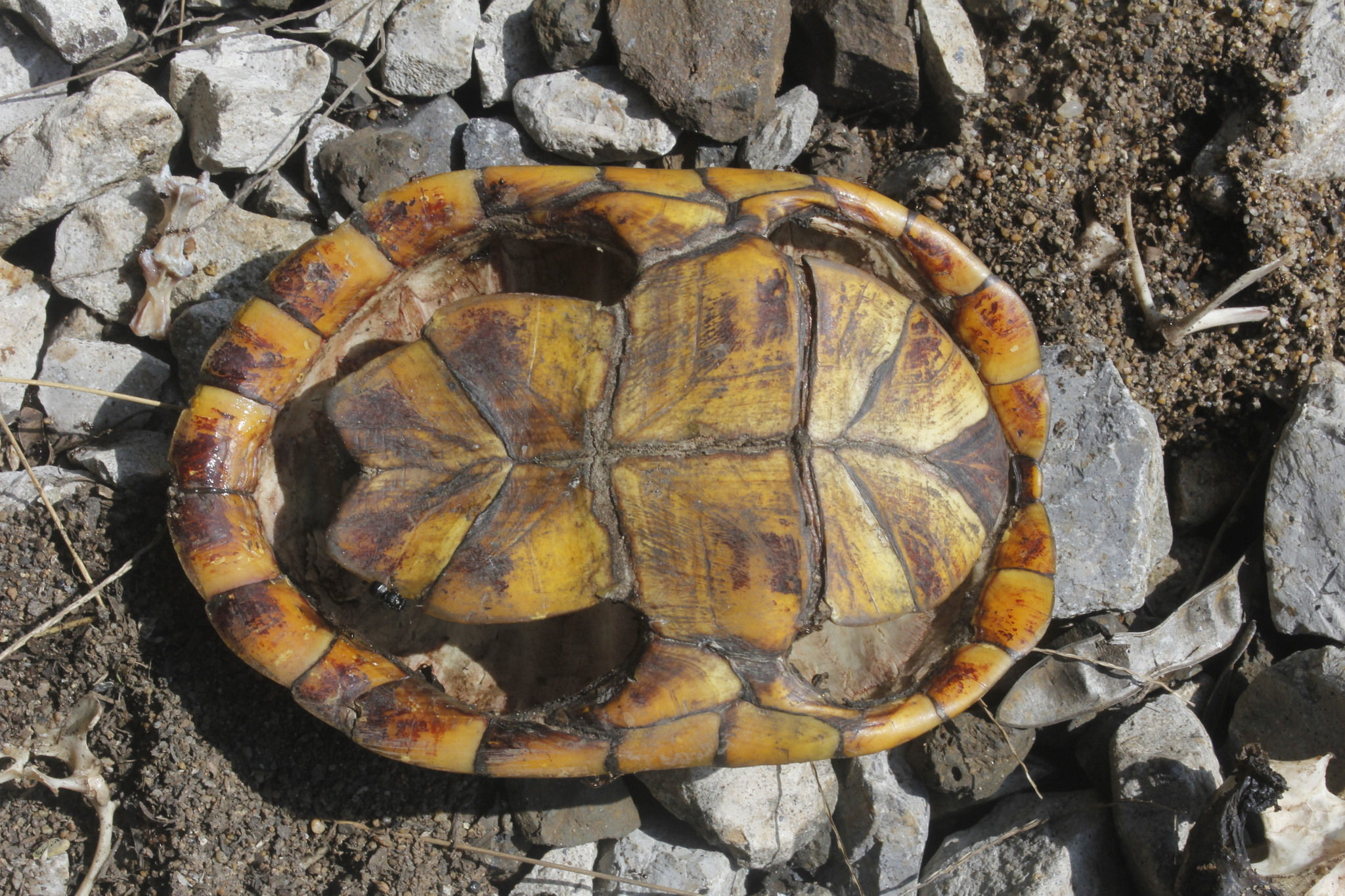
- Plastron

Conservation status
- Near Threatened (IUCN 3.1)

Scientific classification
- Kingdom: Animalia
- Phylum: Chordata
- Class: Reptilia
- Order: Testudines
- Suborder: Cryptodira
- Family: Kinosternidae
- Genus: Kinosternon
- Species: K. herrerai

Binomial name
- Kinosternon herrerai Stejneger, 1925

Synonyms
- Kinosternon herrerai Stejneger, 1925; Kinosternon herrarai [sic] Ippi & Flores, 2001 (ex errore); Cryptochelys herrerai — Iverson, Le & Ingram, 2013; Kinosternon herrerai — Spinks et al. 2014

= Herrera's mud turtle =

Species of turtle

Herrera's mud turtle (Kinosternon herrerai) is a species of mud turtle in the family Kinosternidae. The species is endemic to Mexico.

== Etymology ==
The specific name, herrerai, is in honor of Mexican biologist Alfonso Luis Herrera.

== Geographic range ==
K. herrerai is found in the Mexican states of Hidalgo, Puebla, San Luis Potosí, Tamaulipas, and Veracruz.

== Habitat ==
The preferred natural habitat of K. herrerai is permanent bodies of fresh water, at elevations from sea level to 1,150 m (3,770 ft).

== Life history ==
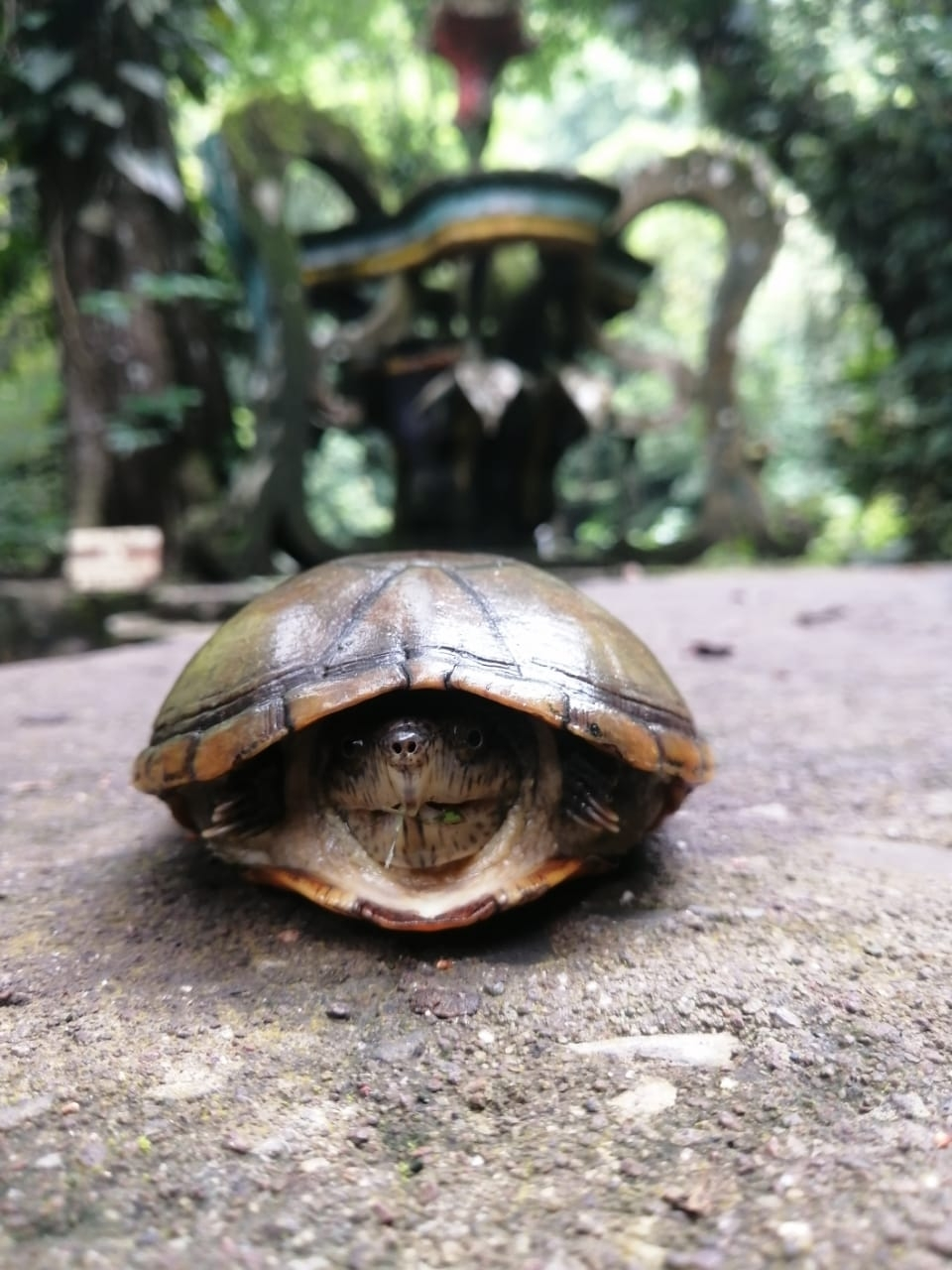
In San Luis Potosí

Based on a 1988 study of a population near Rancho Nuevo in Tamaulipas, Mexico, the males of K. herrerai attain a larger size than females, with a proportionally smaller plastron, and narrower and shallower carapace.

Symbionts reported include a balanomorph barnacle, leeches of the genus Placobdella, and the filamentous green alga Basicladia.

Food items identified indicate an omnivorous diet, with wild figs the major plant component, and several insect orders and millipedes represented.

=== Reproduction ===
Courtship in K. herrerai agrees in most respects with courtship of other kinosternid species. Sexual maturity in females is apparently attained between 115 and 130 mm (4.58 and 5.12 inches) straight carapace length. Clutch size is estimated to range from two to four. Several clutches may be laid in a reproductive season.
