= Intelsat 40e =

Geostationary communications satellite

- Names: IS-40e
- Mission type: Communications
- Operator: Intelsat
- COSPAR ID: 2023-052A
- SATCAT no.: 56174
- Website: Intelsat 40e
- Mission duration: 15 years (planned); Elapsed: 3 years, 4 months and 27 days

Spacecraft properties
- Bus: SSL 1300
- Manufacturer: Maxar Technologies
- Launch mass: 5,440 kg (11,990 lb)

Start of mission
- Launch date: April 7, 2023, 04:30 UTC
- Rocket: Falcon 9 B1076-4
- Launch site: Cape Canaveral SLC-40
- Contractor: SpaceX

Orbital parameters
- Reference system: Geocentric orbit
- Regime: Geostationary orbit
- Longitude: 91° West

Transponders
- Band: 45 transponders: 42 Ku-band, 3 Ka-band
- Coverage area: North America, Central America and Caribbean

Intelsat 40e, also known as IS-40e, is a geostationary communications satellite operated by Intelsat and designed and manufactured by Maxar Technologies on the SSL 1300 satellite bus. It covers North America and Central America from 91° West longitude, it will provide focused coverage for commercial aviation, mobility, and internet connection. Intelsat 40e also features a NASA and Smithsonian-hosted payload, Tropospheric Emissions: Monitoring Pollution (TEMPO).

== Launch ==
The satellite was launched on April 7, 2023 at 04:30 UTC (12:30 AM EDT) from Cape Canaveral, Florida, United States, with a SpaceX Falcon 9 rocket.
