= Barisia jonesi =

Scientific classification
- Kingdom: Animalia
- Phylum: Chordata
- Class: Reptilia
- Order: Squamata
- Suborder: Anguimorpha
- Family: Anguidae
- Genus: Barisia
- Species: B. jonesi

Binomial name
- Barisia jonesi Guillette & H.M. Smith, 1982

Synonyms
- Barisia imbricata jonesi Guillette & H.M. Smith, 1982; Barisia jonesi — H.M. Smith, Burg & Chiszar, 2002

Species of lizard

Barisia jonesi, also known commonly as the imbricate alligator lizard, Jones' imbricate alligator lizard, and el escorpión de Jones in Mexican Spanish, is a species of medium-sized lizard in the family Anguidae. The species is endemic to Mexico.

== Etymology ==
The specific name, jonesi, is in honor of American biologist Richard Evan Jones.

== Geographic range ==
B. jonesi is found in the Mexican state of Michoacán.
