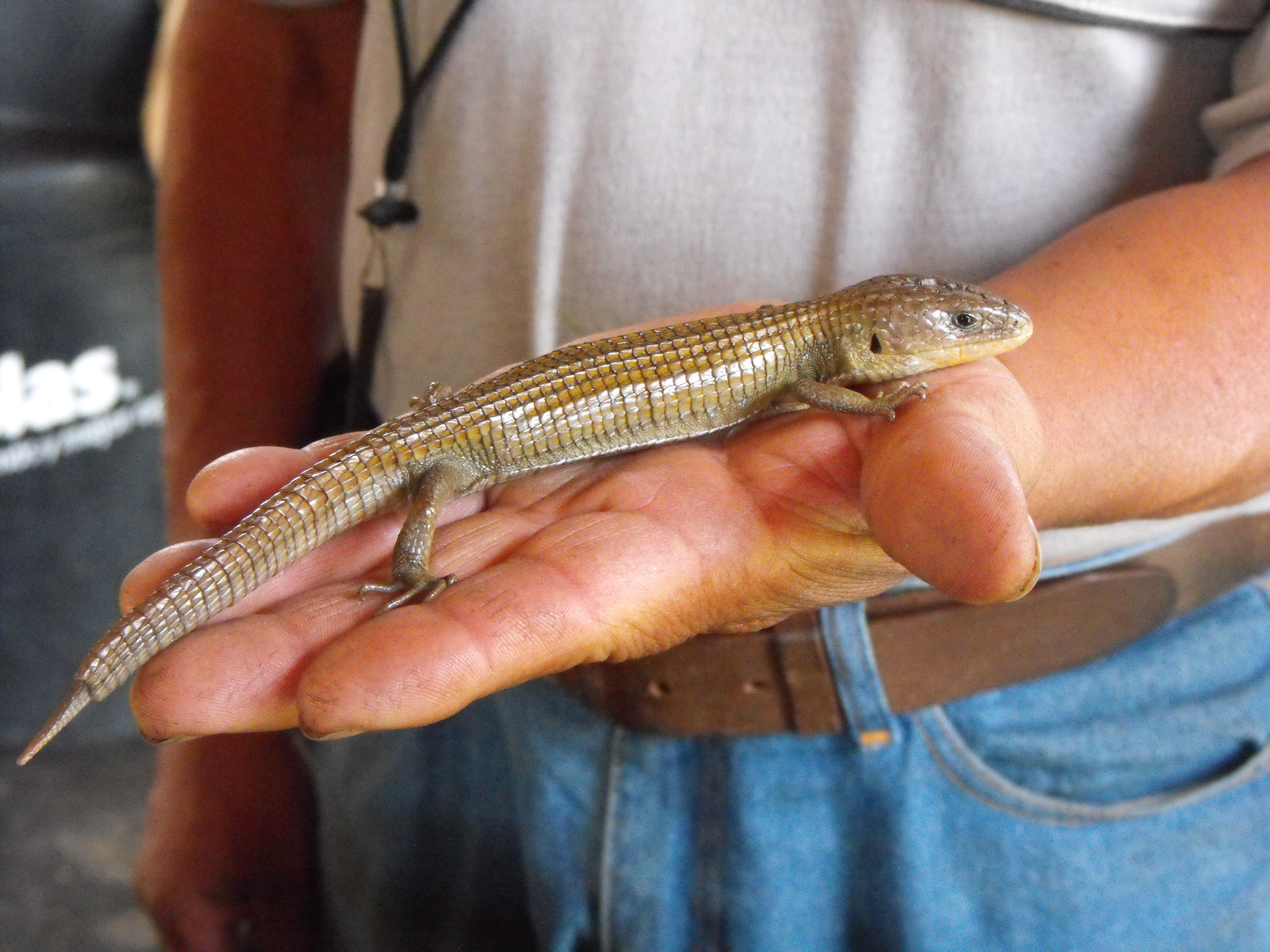

Conservation status
- Least Concern (IUCN 3.1)

Scientific classification
- Kingdom: Animalia
- Phylum: Chordata
- Class: Reptilia
- Order: Squamata
- Suborder: Anguimorpha
- Family: Anguidae
- Genus: Barisia
- Species: B. imbricata

Binomial name
- Barisia imbricata (Wiegmann, 1828)

Synonyms
- Gerrhonotus imbricatus Wiegmann, 1828; Barissia imbricata [sic] Gray, 1845; Barisia imbricata Tihen, 1949

= Barisia imbricata =

Species of lizard

Barisia imbricata, also known commonly as the imbricate alligator lizard, the transvolcanic alligator lizard, and el escorpión de transvolcánico in Mexican Spanish, is a species of medium-sized lizard in the family Anguidae. The species is endemic to Mexico.

A transvolcanic alligator lizard at a reptile expo in Las Vegas.

== Geographic range ==
B. imbricata is found in the Mexican states of Aguascalientes, Chihuahua, Guanajuato, Guerrero, Hidalgo, Jalisco, México, Michoacán, Morelos, Nayarit, Oaxaca, Puebla, Veracruz, and Zacatecas.

== Habitat ==
The preferred natural habitats of B. imbricata are forest and grassland, at altitudes of 1,200–3,000 m (3,900–9,800 ft).

== Behavior ==
B. imbricata is terrestrial.

== Diet ==
B. imbricata preys predominately upon insects but will also kill and eat small vertebrates.

== Reproduction ==
The mode of reproduction of B. imbricata has been described as viviparous and ovoviviparous. Litter size is up to 11 newborns.

Females demonstrate a summer/autumn activity pattern with follicular growth starting in spring (June) and ovulation occurring in Autumn (late August–September). Within the Río Frío, Mexico, Mexico area, ovarian activity is positively correlated with precipitation, however there is no correlation with changes in temperature nor photoperiod (day length).

Males exhibit a pattern of testicular recrudesce in spring (April - May), reach peak activity in Summer (June - August) and a regression in September. There is correlation between testicular recrudescence and both the photoperiod for 19 N latitude and with the precipitation cycle for Río Frío, Mexico, Mexico area.

There is no noted sexual dimorphism in sized; males and females share a similar mean SVL (snout-vent length).
