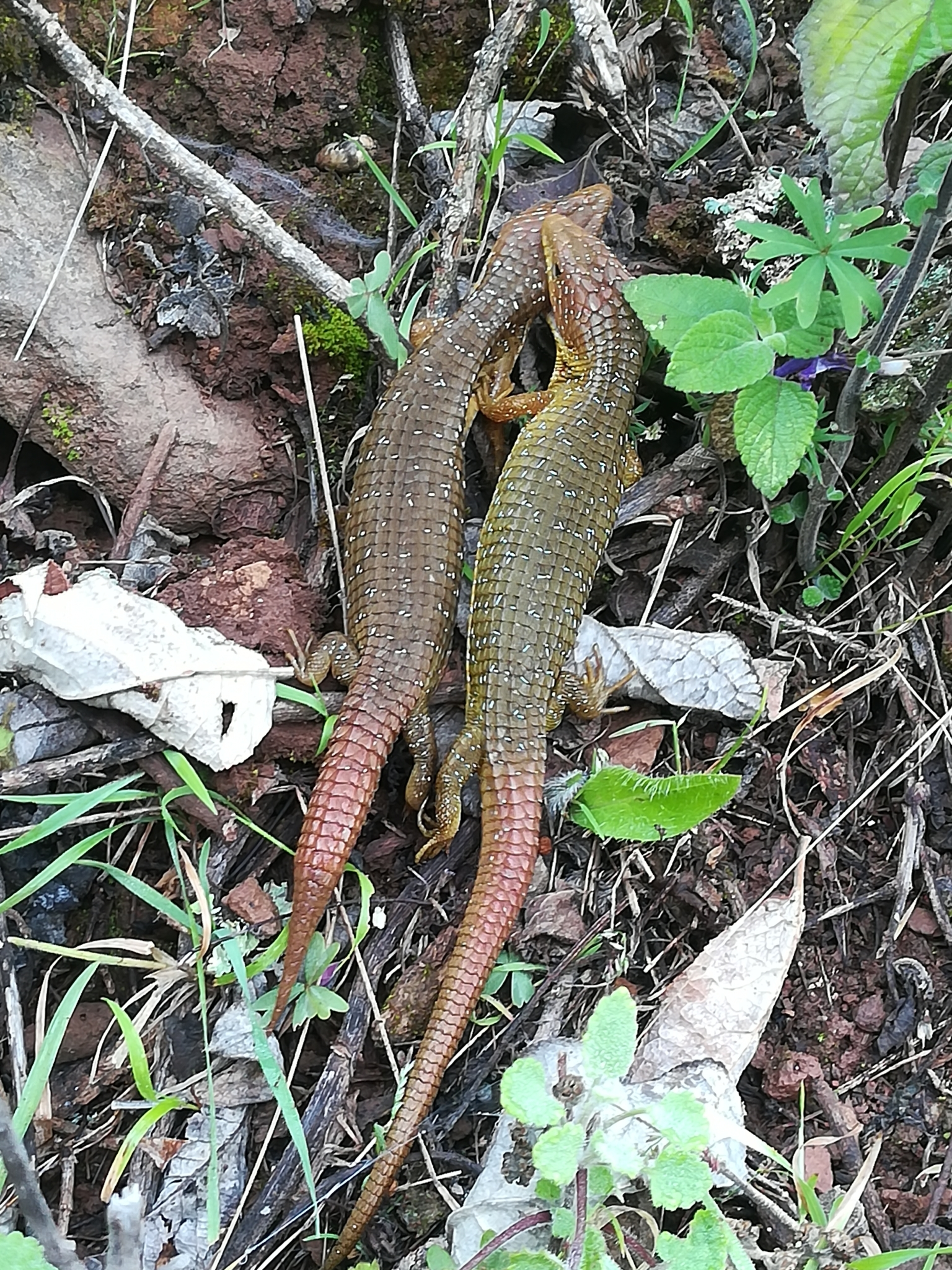

Scientific classification
- Kingdom: Animalia
- Phylum: Chordata
- Class: Reptilia
- Order: Squamata
- Suborder: Anguimorpha
- Family: Anguidae
- Genus: Barisia
- Species: B. ciliaris

Binomial name
- Barisia ciliaris (H.M. Smith, 1942)

Synonyms
- Gerrhonotus levicollis ciliaris H.M. Smith, 1942; Barisia imbricata ciliaris — Tihen, 1949; Barisia ciliaris — H.M. Smith, Burg & Chiszar, 2002

= Barisia ciliaris =

Species of lizard

Barisia ciliaris, also known commonly as the Sierra alligator lizard, the imbricate alligator lizard, and el escorpión de montaña in Mexican Spanish, is a species of medium-sized lizard in the family Anguidae. The species is endemic to Mexico.

== Geographic range ==
B. ciliaris is found in the Mexican states of Aguascalientes, Chihuahua, southern Coahuila, Durango, Hidalgo, Jalisco, Nuevo León, Querétaro, San Luis Potosí, Sinaloa, Tamaulipas, and Zacatecas.

== Reproduction ==
B. ciliaris is viviparous.
