= Wuchang: Fallen Feathers =

- Developer: Leenzee
- Publisher: 505 Games
- Director: Xia Siyuan
- Producer: Xia Siyuan
- Engine: Unreal Engine 5
- Platforms: PlayStation 5; Windows; Xbox Series X/S
- Release: 24 July 2025
- Genre: Soulslike action role-playing
- Mode: Single-player

Wuchang: Fallen Feathers (Note: Simplified Chinese: 明末：渊虚之羽; traditional Chinese: 明末：淵虛之羽; pinyin: Míngmò: Yuānxū Zhī Yǔ. The Chinese title roughly translates to "Late Ming: Feathers of the Abyss".) is a 2025 Soulslike action role-playing game developed by Leenzee and published by 505 Games. The player assumes the role of Bai Wuchang, a female pirate, who navigates the supernatural horrors stemming from the Feathering. Set in an alternate history representation of Shu during the late Ming dynasty, the story explores a region ravaged by war and plague.

Wuchang: Fallen Feathers was released for PlayStation 5, Windows, and Xbox Series X/S on 24 July 2025. It sold over 1 million units as of March 2026 and reached 5 million players by July 2026. An upcoming sequel, developed by Indolphinity and published by 505 Games, has been announced.

== Gameplay ==
Wuchang: Fallen Feathers is a Soulslike action role-playing game. It is played in single-player mode from a third-person perspective.

The player controls the female pirate Bai Wuchang. She initially wields the Cloudfrost's Edge, a longsword based on the Chinese changdao. She can wield weapons of several types, namely longswords, one-handed swords, dual blades, axes, and spears. The weapons are equipped as a primary or secondary option. They are used to perform light attacks, heavy attacks, weapon skills, and disciplines. Weapon skills are unique to each individual weapon, while disciplines are tied to weapon types. Disciplines are unlocked through the skill tree and assigned to any weapon within the corresponding type. Defensive maneuvers consist of dodges, blocks, and deflects (parries), with the latter two depending on the disciplines available to specific weapon types.

In this gameplay, Bai Wuchang performs disciplines and a spell, both fueled by skyborn might, as part of her offense. Throughout, she does shimmers, one of the methods she uses to restore skyborn might.

A core combat mechanic is centered on skyborn might, which functions as a resource used to perform weapon skills, disciplines, and spells. It also enables swift draws, which are maneuvers to instantly switch to another weapon and execute its skill. It is accrued by performing shimmers (well-timed dodges) and through other methods specific to each weapon type. It is visually represented by the colored feathers attached to Wuchang's arm.

Another core combat mechanic is centered on madness. If Wuchang kills humanoids or dies, her madness increases. If she kills feathered beings, her madness decreases. Other means to influence her madness are also available. Her madness is visually represented through her eyes turning red and her body manifesting demonic markings. Some skill tree upgrades become more effective once her madness reaches specific heights. Once her madness reaches 90 percent, she will both deal and take increased damage. If she dies with maximum madness, the Inner Demon materializes as a hostile entity that attacks her and everything else that targets it.

The skill tree, which is known as the impetus repository, is accessed through shrines. It is divided in six branches, with one path focused on each weapon type and another path for other features. The playstyle can be adjusted by reallocating points in the skill tree at no cost. Red mercury is a resource that can either be refined into red mercury essence for use as points in the skill tree or be used as currency to purchase items at vendors. Upon death, it is dropped in a proportion determined by the height of madness.

There is a feature to transmogrify armor, which enables the customization of the player character's appearance independently of stats. According to Xia Siyuan, "Armour designs are drawn from Ming Dynasty influences, regional clothing traditions, and mythological elements that tie into the world of Wuchang. Each piece is meant to reflect where it comes from — whether it's a forgotten temple, a warrior's clan, or a corrupted region touched by the feathering."

The game is structured as a non-linear experience. Its world consists of multiple interconnected areas. The traversal between areas is seamless, but some paths may initially be restricted. Shrines, which serve as checkpoints, are scattered throughout the environment. Non-player characters may offer dialogue and provide side quests. Player choices influence the story's direction and ending. A New Game Plus mode becomes available following the completion of a playthrough.

== Synopsis ==
=== Setting ===
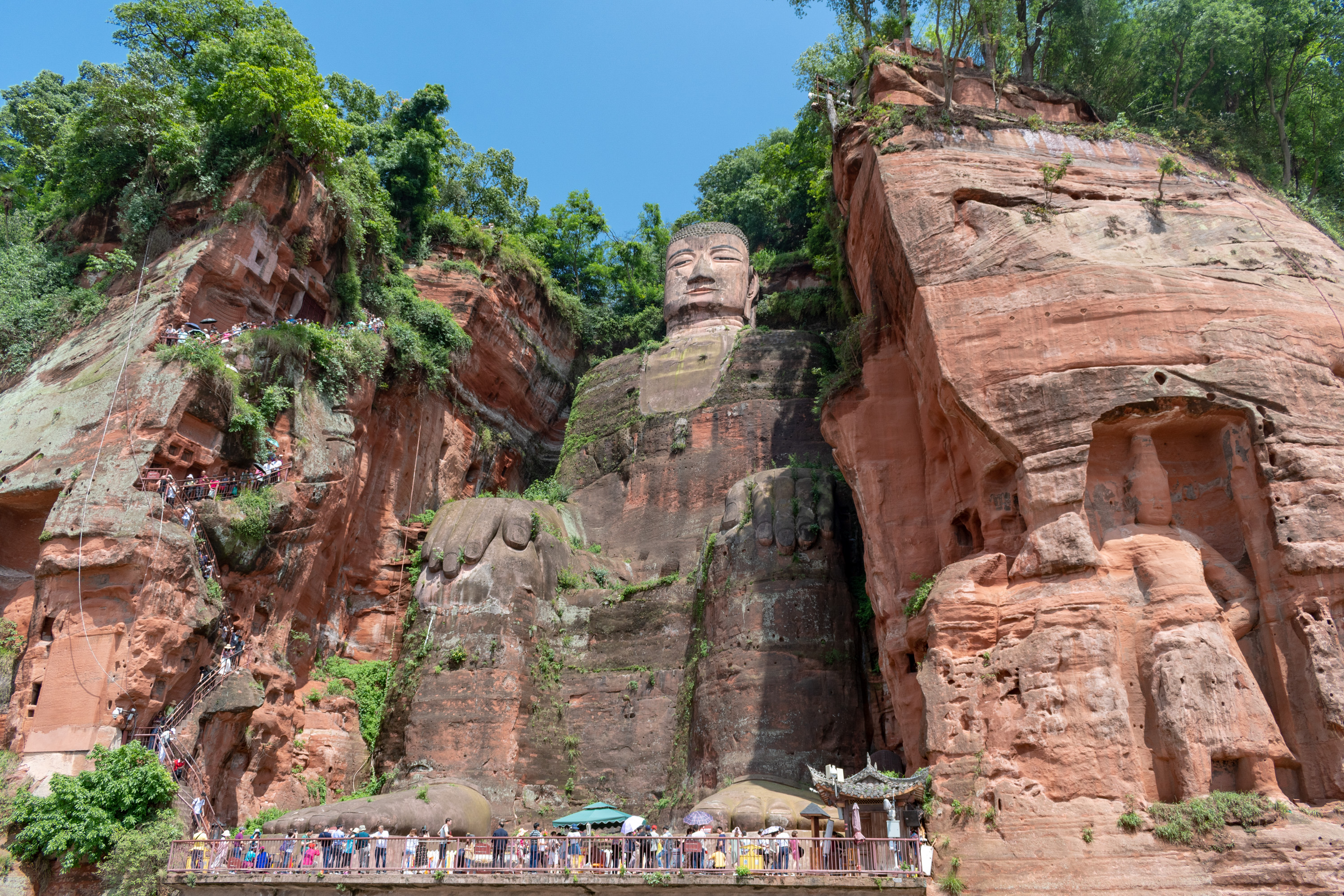
The game features scenery based on Sichuan and historical Shu. This includes, for example, the Leshan Giant Buddha.

Wuchang: Fallen Feathers is set in the war-torn and plague-stricken region of Shu during the late Ming dynasty. The Feathering is a disease spreading across the region, causing the gradual decline and collapse of society and its environment. The setting is presented through an alternate history centered on the disease. According to Xia Siyuan, "Our portrayal of historical events aligns with mainstream historiography. However, the game's world diverges due to supernatural forces that reshaped history millennia ago. We show this through our worldbuilding, which traces back to the era of King Duyu of Shu [from the legendary era of Shu]."

=== Plot ===
During the late Ming dynasty, the region of Shu is devastated by warring factions and plagued by the Feathering. This affliction erodes memory, induces madness, and initiates monstrous transformation. The female pirate Bai Wuchang returns to find an ancient artifact capable of resurrecting her younger sister Bai Yu. She possesses the Ancient Chisel, one of the artifact's remnants.

Following a feathered monstrosity's rampage in Worship's Rise, Bai Wuchang becomes afflicted with the Feathering and loses her memory. She is found unconscious and taken to a cave near the Reverent Temple by the Taoist Xuanyangzi. Wuchang sets out for the Shu Sanctum, rumored to hold the knowledge needed to treat the disease, but finds the place neglected. She reunites with He Youzai, her crewmate and quest companion. Wuchang treks to the Tang Emperor's Palace and discovers the Jade Ancient Chisel within the complex. Honglan, the Commander of the Imperial Guard, fights her and takes the chisel.

Bai Wuchang pursues the Imperial Guard, who has the Jade Ancient Chisel, to Cloudspire. Ming and rebel forces are engaged in conflict. Wuchang kills Huang Yan, the Madam of Snowfall Palace, in combat and finds Honglan imprisoned within the complex. Earlier, the Madam used the chisel to revive the abducted Fang Ling and turn her into a perfect bride, but it changed her into a monstrosity. Wuchang kills Ling in combat and retrieves the chisel. Meanwhile, Fang Yao seeks to rescue her elder sister Ling and dies during the attempt to find her. Alternatively, if Yao has received Wuchang's help, she mourns and buries her sister, but encounters He Youzai and joins him on his travels.

At Mount Zhenwu, a rebel army seizes control and slaughters the locals. In the Zhenwu Temple, the rebels use the Aurum Ancient Chisel to resurrect their leader Zhang Xianzhong, but it twists him into a monstrosity. Bai Wuchang kills him in combat and retrieves the chisel. Wuchang can visit the Bai Mansion, her family home. Years ago, Governor-General Bai Tingzhao, her father, took the Ancient Chisel from the temple and used it to resurrect his son Bai Kru, but it reshaped the toddler into a monstrosity. In the marshlands, Wuchang can assist Zhao Yun in killing the Bo Sorcerer, an Avian woman, in combat and defeat him in a duel to claim the Cyan Ancient Chisel.

Worship's Rise is reduced to ruins by the Bo Magus. Bai Wuchang can kill her in combat. If she does not have the Polygonal Container, a protective object, she consequently becomes ensnared by her power and ascends as an altered entity in the Successor of the Bo ending. (Note: The four possible endings are Successor of the Bo, Jarful of Medicine, Dream's Sweet Deceit, and Bound by Fate's Threads.) Wuchang can kill the Nightmare Demon, an incarnation of herself who has awaken to the world's mortal guise and seeks to end the dream that binds them, in combat. Xuanyangzi laments about the loss of a chisel and claims the object could have advanced the study on the Feathering. In response, Wuchang can give the Jade Ancient Chisel to him. Ming loyalists use the Vermilion Ancient Chisel to resurrect the Ming Emperor Zhu Youjian, but it warps the ruler into a monstrosity. Wuchang defeats him in combat and retrieves the chisel. Meanwhile, He Youzai and Fang Yao are killed by an unknown party. Alternatively, if Wuchang has followed their travels, Youzai and Yao give the two halves of the Ring of Samsara to her.

The Bo Capital, the heart of Ancient Shu, lies entombed beneath Worship's Rise. During ancient times, the Avians crafted red mercury with the aim to bend fate and used the chisels as tools in rituals to warp reality. In a shrine dwelling, Bai Wuchang can kill the Demon of Obsession, an incarnation of herself who never let go of her fixation to revive Bai Yu even after a thousand journeys across dreams, in combat and form the Ring of Samsara that serves as a causality key to reach that very wish. At the Gate of Truth, Wuchang faces Xuanyangzi, whose machinations have enabled his ascension as a feathered immortal, and kills him in combat. She then passes through the gate.

- In the Jarful of Medicine ending, Bai Wuchang enters the stream of Samsara. Although the feathered Xuanyangzi is dead, another incarnation of him thrusts a sword through her. As the cycle turns anew, Xuanyangzi seals Wuchang within a jar, while another Wuchang begins her journey.
- In the Dream's Sweet Deceit ending, Bai Wuchang enters the realm of dreams. She departs with He Youzai and Bai Yu on a boat. She remains afflicted with the Feathering.
- In the Bound by Fate's Threads ending, Bai Wuchang enters the realm of truth. She departs with He Youzai and Fang Yao on a boat, while a ship waits in the distance. She is free from the Feathering.

== Development ==
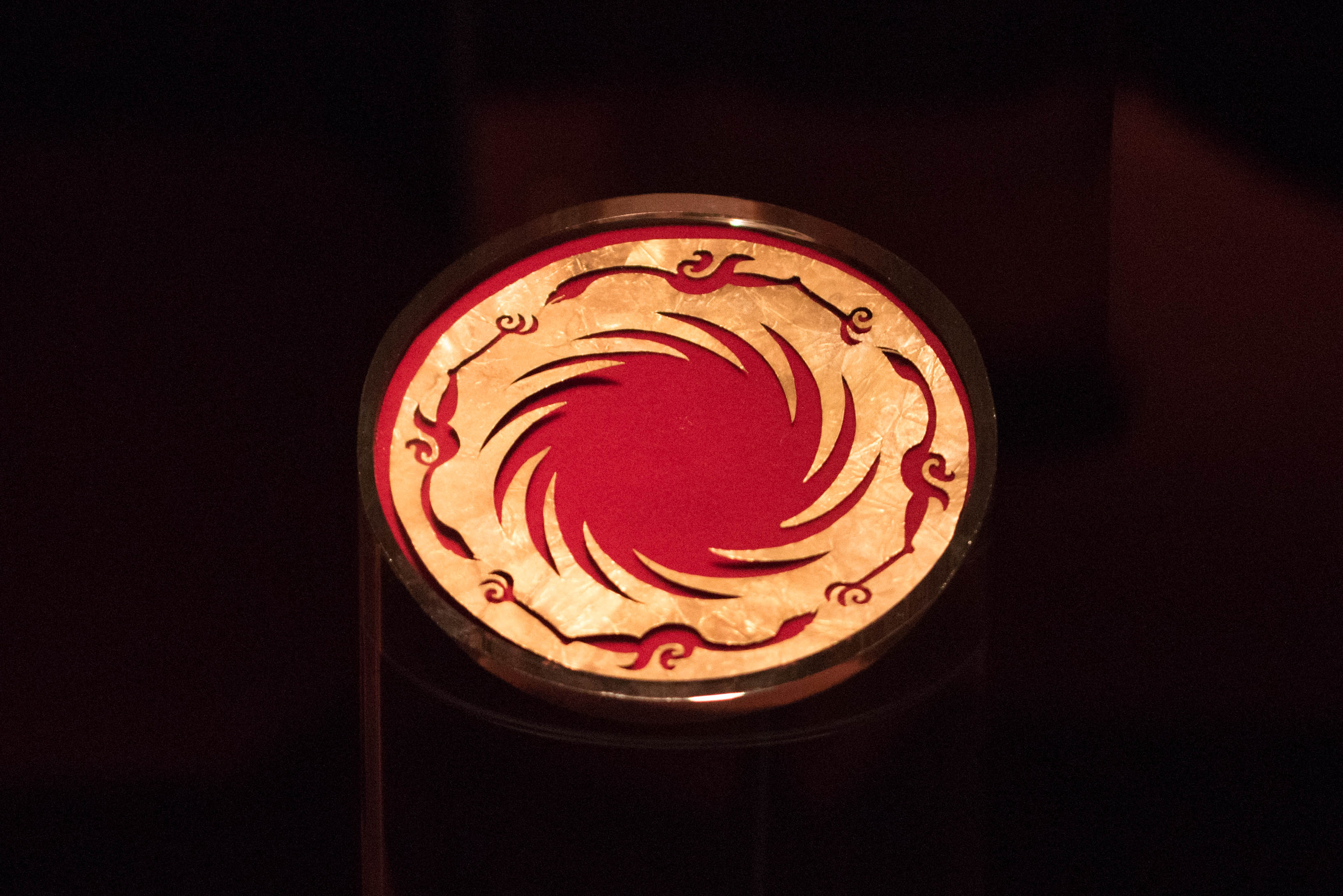
The Sun and Immortal Birds Gold Ornament from Jinsha is one of the artifacts recreated in the game.

Wuchang: Fallen Feathers is a game developed by Leenzee and published by 505 Games. Leenzee is based in Chengdu, Sichuan, China. The game was built using Unreal Engine 5.

Leenzee officially approved the project in 2019. According to CEO Jiang Min, the company was facing a dire financial situation and relied on doing work outsourced by foreign companies to stay afloat around that time. He said that although the work generated revenue, it was not the kind of work that motivated employees to stay on. He explained that the project was thus launched as a source of hope for everyone. When the game was unveiled in September 2021, it had been in development for about a year and a half. After 2021, the development team was separated from the company's original pipeline and reorganized into an independent unit.

Historical sites of ancient Shu societies such as Sanxingdui and Jinsha were drawn upon by the developers. Historical and mythical elements featured in classic literature, including the Annals of the Kings of Shu, the Brocade Zither, and the Classic of Mountains and Seas, were adapted. The distinctive landscape of Sichuan and historical Shu, including the architecture and topography, was recreated in the scenery. Sichuanese dialects were used for the Chinese voiceovers of numerous non-player characters.

According to Xia Siyuan, "Our game's world is based on a parallel universe concept - one that branched off from our own reality due to a small divergence during the time of Duyu. Building on that idea, we consulted a wide range of historical texts, studied numerous Ming Dynasty artifacts, and visited museums to deepen our understanding. From there, we created a full timeline and narrative arc spanning from the Duyu era to the Ming Dynasty, striving to make the world feel authentic and believable. We also drew inspiration from cultural traditions such as the Sanxingdui civilization, Sichuan opera face-changing, and the iron flower ritual, as well as from Ming-era Confucian, Buddhist, and Taoist philosophies and the evolution of firearms. These influences have been woven directly into the gameplay. Our hope is that these elements not only capture the historical atmosphere but also allow players to truly experience the unique cultural richness of the region." Furthermore, he said that the particular period during the Ming dynasty was a time of transition and uncertainty that was marked by political collapse, widespread conflict, and major shifts in worldview, which reflects a kind of instability that enabled the team to explore deeper themes such as decay, fate, and transformation in a grounded way.

According to Xia, "For boss designs, we drew inspiration from Chinese history and culture, especially archaeological discoveries like Sanxingdui, as well as elements from Chinese mythology and folk stories, such as the Classic of Mountains and Seas and the 'Jiangkou Sunken Silver' legend. We hope to convey the uniqueness of these bosses through visual design, while also interpreting the 'Chinese-style supernatural' genre in the story."

Bai Wuchang's movements were created using motion capture of a female martial artist's performances.

Wuchang: Fallen Feathers
- Original Soundtrack
- A playlist published by 505 Games and 8082 Audio on YouTube

The game's soundtrack was produced by 8082 Audio. It employed Chinese musical instruments, such as the guqin, xiao, xun, erhu, and others. Its creation process was closely aligned to the game's scene design, which resulted in elements such as the distant sound of the xiao in deep mountain forests, the low tones of the xun in ritual scenes, and the impassioned drumbeats in combat segments.

Xia commented that the success of Black Myth: Wukong provided many positive signs and boosted confidence in the future of Chinese studios as well as validated the market, while internally it confirmed that developing Wuchang: Fallen Feathers was the right decision and the game was on the right track.

== Release ==
Wuchang: Fallen Feathers was released for PC (Windows), PlayStation 5, and Xbox Series X/S on 24 July 2025. It launched as a Day One release on the subscription service Xbox Game Pass. It was available as one of the monthly games on the subscription service PlayStation Plus in May 2026.

Leenzee unveiled Wuchang: Fallen Feathers with a gameplay showcase during Bilibili's High Energy Video Game Festival (高能电玩节) on 17 September 2021. At the time, the game had been in development for about a year and a half. 505 Games took notice of the game following its initial reveal, so the company's senior management engaged in communications with Xia Siyuan and unanimously decided to sign the game. During the Xbox Games Showcase in June 2024, Leenzee and 505 Games released a trailer revealing a 2025 release window. In March 2025, they confirmed on social media that the game would launch in the summer of 2025. In April 2025, they released a trailer announcing the release date as 24 July 2025.

For the launch, Wuchang: Fallen Feathers received a Standard Edition and a Deluxe Edition. The latter adds extra in-game content comprising four costume sets (Tiger of Fortune, Draconic Resurgence, Soul Ritual Robe, and Overlord's Regalia), four weapons (Watcher's Gaze, Dragoncoil Lance, Eternal Sovereignty, and Moonlight Dragon), and a skill upgrade item. In post-release updates, the game was expanded with additional in-game content comprising various other costume sets, costume pieces, and weapons. The game was available for pre-order starting in April 2025. Two costume sets (Night Spectre and White Spectre), a weapon (Vermillion War Club), and a skill upgrade item were in-game bonus incentives for pre-ordering.

For the launch, Wuchang: Fallen Feathers received the Day One Edition as its physical standard version. The edition includes a voucher code to redeem extra in-game content comprising two costume sets (Night Spectre and White Spectre), a weapon (Vermillion War Club), and a skill upgrade item. It is available for PlayStation 5 and Xbox Series X.

Official merchandise for Wuchang: Fallen Feathers was created. A music collection was produced in three editions. Each of these editions includes a music CD, a metal case, a tracklist, and one or more additional collectible items; the Collector's Edition features a protagonist figurine as one of the collectibles. Separately, a soundtrack on vinyl was produced in two editions. Gaming controllers were produced in various thematic designs.

=== Sequel ===
In July 2026, Digital Bros, the parent company of 505 Games, announced that a sequel to Wuchang: Fallen Feathers would be developed by Chengdu Recursive Dolphin Technology and published by 505 Games. The development studio, which was founded by Xia Siyuan, does business as Indolphinity. Furthermore, Raffi Galante, co-CEO of Digital Bros, and Xia Siyuan confirmed the partnership between the companies and their commitment to continuing Wuchang.

505 Games stated that "Today, we're excited to share that 505 Games has officially entered into a new partnership with Xia Siyuan, the original creator of WUCHANG: Fallen Feathers, and his new studio Indolphinity (Chengdu Recursive Dolphin Technology), to jointly create a brand‑new chapter of the WUCHANG IP. [...] As of now, the WUCHANG sequel has officially entered its preparation phase: Indolphinity will lead the creative development, while 505 Games will provide funding and global publishing. Future development will remain firmly rooted in China."

Xia had left Leenzee in the preceding period, but the circumstances of his departure were not disclosed. Unconfirmed reports claimed that Leenzee had dismissed Xia and other members of the original development team. 505 Games reached out to Xia with an opportunity to continue Wuchang, which ultimately led to a renewed collaboration. Following the establishment of Indolphinity, many members of the original team joined the new studio. In April 2026, Digital Bros stated that it had acquired the intellectual property rights relating to Wuchang: Fallen Feathers from Leenzee.

Bai Wuchang remains the protagonist in the sequel.

== Reception ==
=== Reviews ===
Reception

Aggregate scores
Aggregator	Score
Metacritic	PC: 77/100; PS5: 74/100; XSX: 81/100
OpenCritic	70% recommend

Wuchang: Fallen Feathers received "generally favorable" reviews on PC and Xbox Series X from critics, as well as "mixed or average" reviews on PlayStation 5 from critics, according to review aggregator Metacritic.

On the release day, Wuchang: Fallen Feathers received "mostly negative" reviews overall from users on Steam, with criticism focused on PC performance and other issues. Leenzee and 505 Games pledged to address the problems, stating "These problems should never have occurred, and we deeply regret the inconvenience and negative experience some players are currently facing." Beginning the following day, the team released updates aimed at improving performance and resolving other concerns. Furthermore, they issued an apology, stating "First and foremost, we sincerely apologize for the inconvenience and appreciate everyone for their continued patience and understanding regarding the recent issues surrounding the launch of WUCHANG: Fallen Feathers. Your experience and feedback is so valuable foundation [sic] for our team." Additionally, they announced plans to provide players with extra content as compensation. Through the first month, overall user reviews reached "mixed" on Steam.

=== Sales ===
On the release day, Wuchang: Fallen Feathers reached a peak of 131,518 concurrent players on Steam.

In a September 2025 financial report, Digital Bros, the parent company of 505 Games, stated that "With respect to the Premium Games segment, the first quarter of the current fiscal year marked the launch of the video game Wuchang: Fallen Feathers, which became available across most marketplaces in July. The title achieved significant sales volumes and more recent reviews on Steam now sit at over 80% positive, despite receiving negative reviews in the first few days immediately after launch. According to some Chinese media reports, Wuchang: Fallen Feathers may have been the best-selling Chinese premium video game in 2025 so far." In a November 2025 financial report, Digital Bros stated that the game had a successful launch that benefited the first quarter of FY2026 and generated significant volumes in the quarter that drove the increase in the revenue share from co-owned intellectual properties and long-term publishing agreements.

In April 2026, Digital Bros stated that Wuchang: Fallen Feathers had sold over 1 million units as of 31 March 2026. In July 2026, during the game's first-year anniversary, 505 Games stated that the game had reached 5 million players.

=== Accolades ===
Wuchang: Fallen Feathers won Surprise of the Year and was nominated for Most Anticipated Game at the UCG Game Awards 2024.

== See also ==
- Heibai Wuchang
