= Liuyang fireworks =

Fireworks from Liuyang, Hunan, China

Fireworks are a specialty of Liuyang city in Hunan Province, People's Republic of China, with a history dating back to the Tang and Song dynasties. Liuyang's production skills were selected into the first batch of China's national intangible cultural heritage representative projects list.

Liyuang accounts for approximately 60% of the country's domestic firework production and 70% of its exports. In 2025, the industry reached an output value of roughly 50.58 billion Yuan (7.4 billion USD).

== Features ==
The production of Liuyang fireworks uses traditional handcraft techniques, utilizing locally sourced materials such as paper, saltpeter, sulfur, charcoal, and red and white clay. The process involves 12 steps and 72 procedures. With advancements in modern technology, new safe, eco-friendly products have been developed, including smokeless fireworks, cold light fireworks, daytime fireworks, and indoor or stage fireworks, achieving world-class standards. Additionally, ignition methods have evolved from traditional manual lighting to remote-controlled systems, with firing sequences fully managed by computer programming.

== History ==
According to the Chinese Industrial Gazetteer, firecrackers "originated in the Tang Dynasty, flourished in the Song Dynasty, and originated in Liuyang." The original motive for the creation of fireworks was to ward off evil spirits. More than 1,300 years ago, Li Tian from Dayao, Liuyang (born on the 18th day of the 4th lunar month in 601, died on the 18th day of the 12th lunar month in 690), invented firecrackers on the 18th day of the 9th lunar month in 621. In Liuyang City, there are still traces of historical gunpowder research and development at the foot of a mountain at the banks of the Liuyang River preserved for future generations to worship. It was said that he mixed charcoal, sulfur and saltpeter, compressed the mixture in an enclosure (a bamboo tube) and the mixture exploded when it was burned. Because of Li Tian's invention, Liuyang became synonymous with fireworks.

During the Yongzheng reign of the Qing dynasty (1644–1911), Liuyang fireworks became an article of tribute to the royal families which gave an added impetus to the developing trade. Fireworks workshops boomed, until more than nine out of ten households were engaged in the trade. Fireworks began to be exported to more than 20 countries and regions.

In 1933, "Shijixiang" won an award at the Chicago International Exposition for its "Deer Bamboo" brand fireworks. In 1995, Liuyang City was named the "Hometown of Fireworks in China". In 2001, a local Fireworks Culture Research Association was established. In 2004, the Liuyang fireworks brand was registered as a well-known trademark by the Trademark Office of the State Administration for Industry and Commerce. On May 20, 2007, the traditional techniques of making Liuyang fireworks were included in the first batch of national intangible cultural heritage listings.

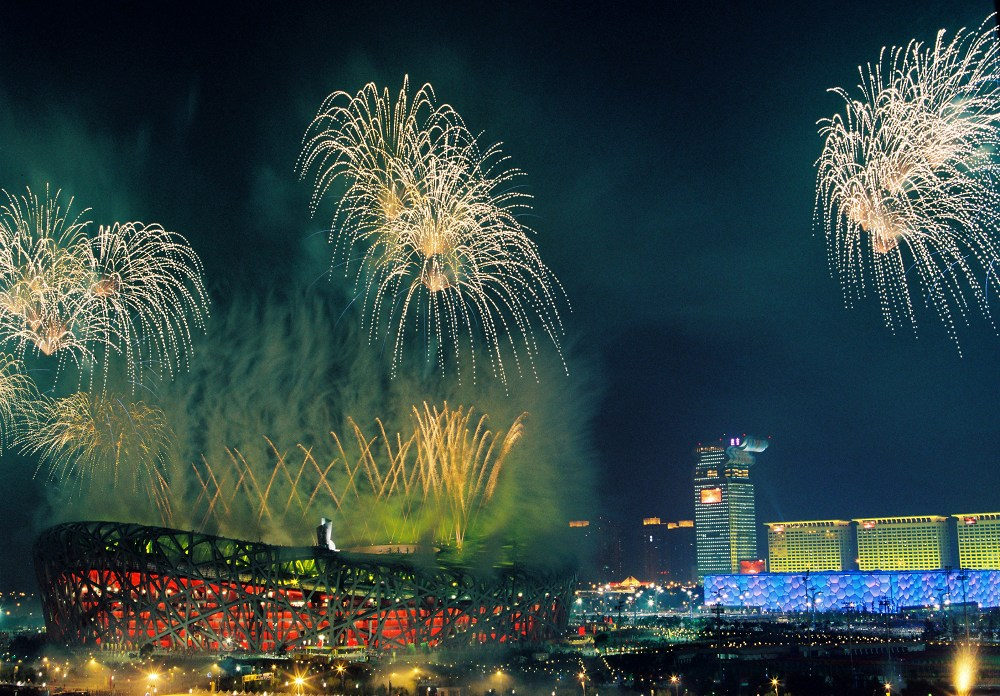
Fireworks at the opening ceremony of the 2008 Summer Olympics

Liuyang is the world's most concentrated area of fireworks production. Liuyang fireworks were used at the 2008 Summer Olympics and 2022 Winter Olympics in Beijing.

=== 2026 Liuyang fireworks factory explosion ===
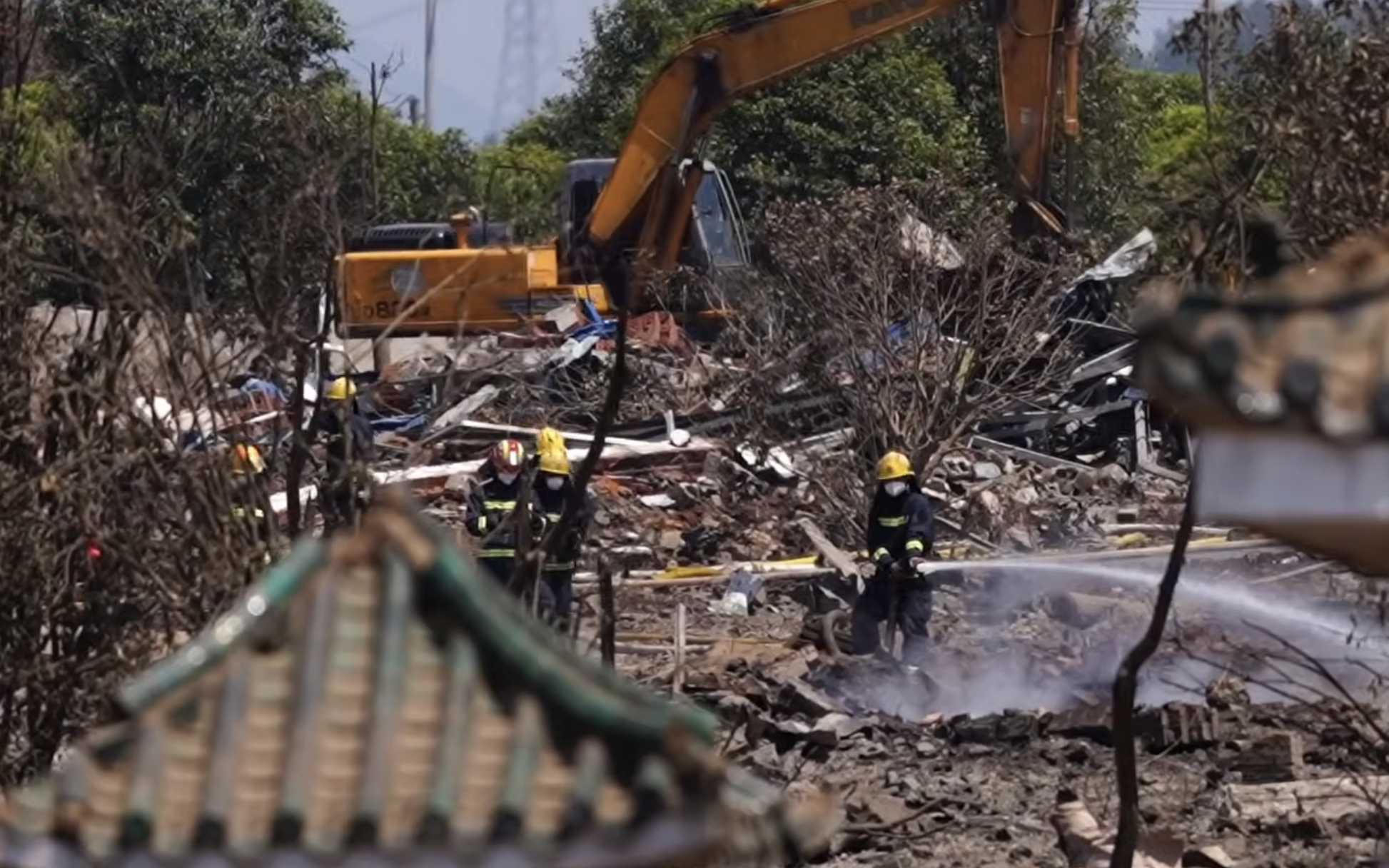
Aftermath of the 2026 Liuyang fireworks factory explosion

On 4 May 2026, an explosion occurred at a fireworks factory operated by Huasheng Fireworks Manufacturing and Display Co. in Guandu, Liuyang. At least 37 people were killed and 51 others were injured.

== See also ==
- Chinese fireworks
- Iron flower
