= 2026 Liuyang fireworks factory explosion =

Industrial explosion in Hunan, China

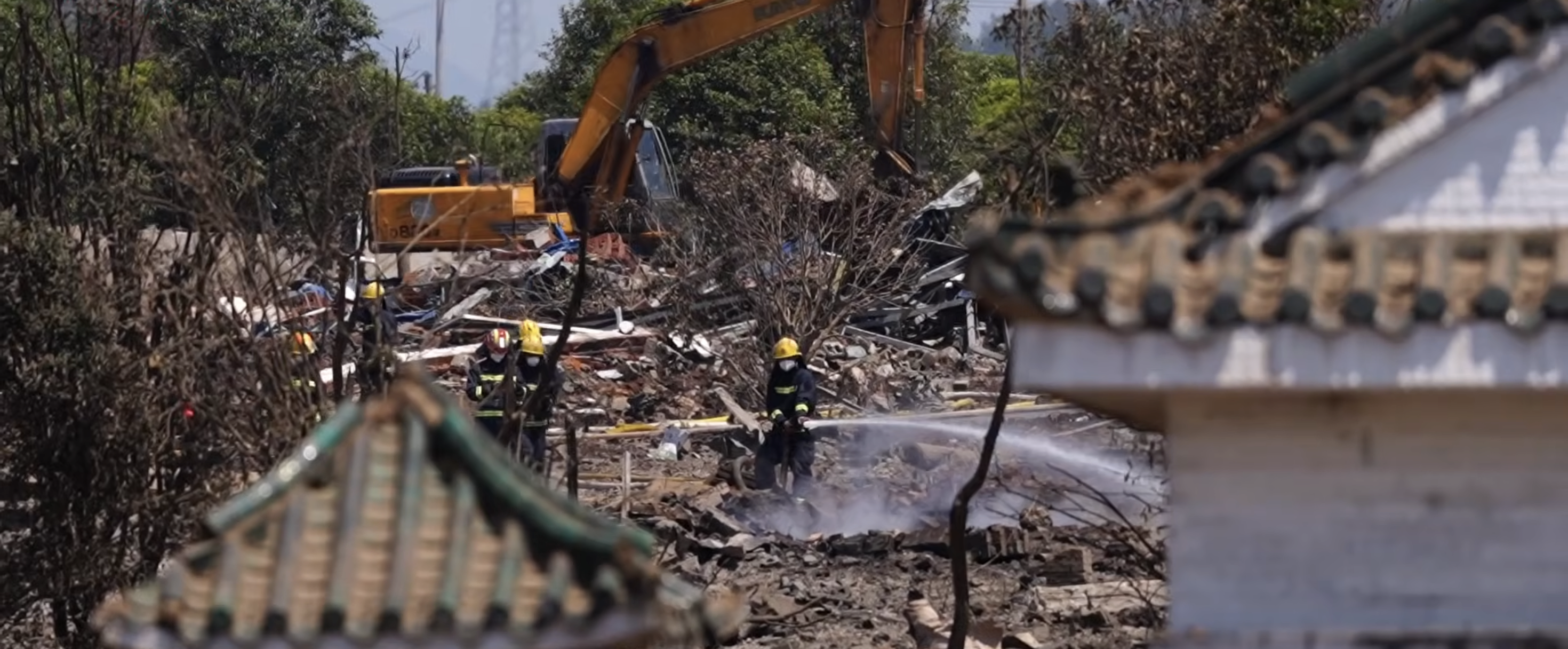
- Firefighters at the scene of the explosion
- Date: 4 May 2026
- Time: c. 16:43 (CST; UTC+08:00)
- Location: Huasheng Fireworks Manufacturing and Display Co., Guandu, Liuyang, Changsha, Hunan, China; 28°21′1″N 113°56′18″E
- Type: Fireworks factory explosion
- Cause: Under investigation
- Deaths: 37
- Injuries: 51
- Missing: 1

On 4 May 2026, an explosion occurred at a fireworks factory operated by Huasheng Fireworks Manufacturing and Display Co. in Guandu, Liuyang, a county-level city administered by Changsha in Hunan, China. The blast occurred at about 16:43 local time in a workshop at the plant. At least 37 people were killed, 51 others were injured and one person remains missing.

The explosion caused severe damage at the plant and it complicated rescue work because of the presence of black powder and other flammable materials. Authorities evacuated nearby areas, detained the person in charge of the company and ordered fireworks manufacturers in Liuyang to halt production for safety inspections.

== Background ==
Liuyang is one of China's best-known centres of fireworks production and is often described in Chinese and international reporting as a major fireworks manufacturing base. The explosion occurred at Huasheng Fireworks Manufacturing and Display Co., a fireworks enterprise located in Guandu, Liuyang.

== Explosion ==
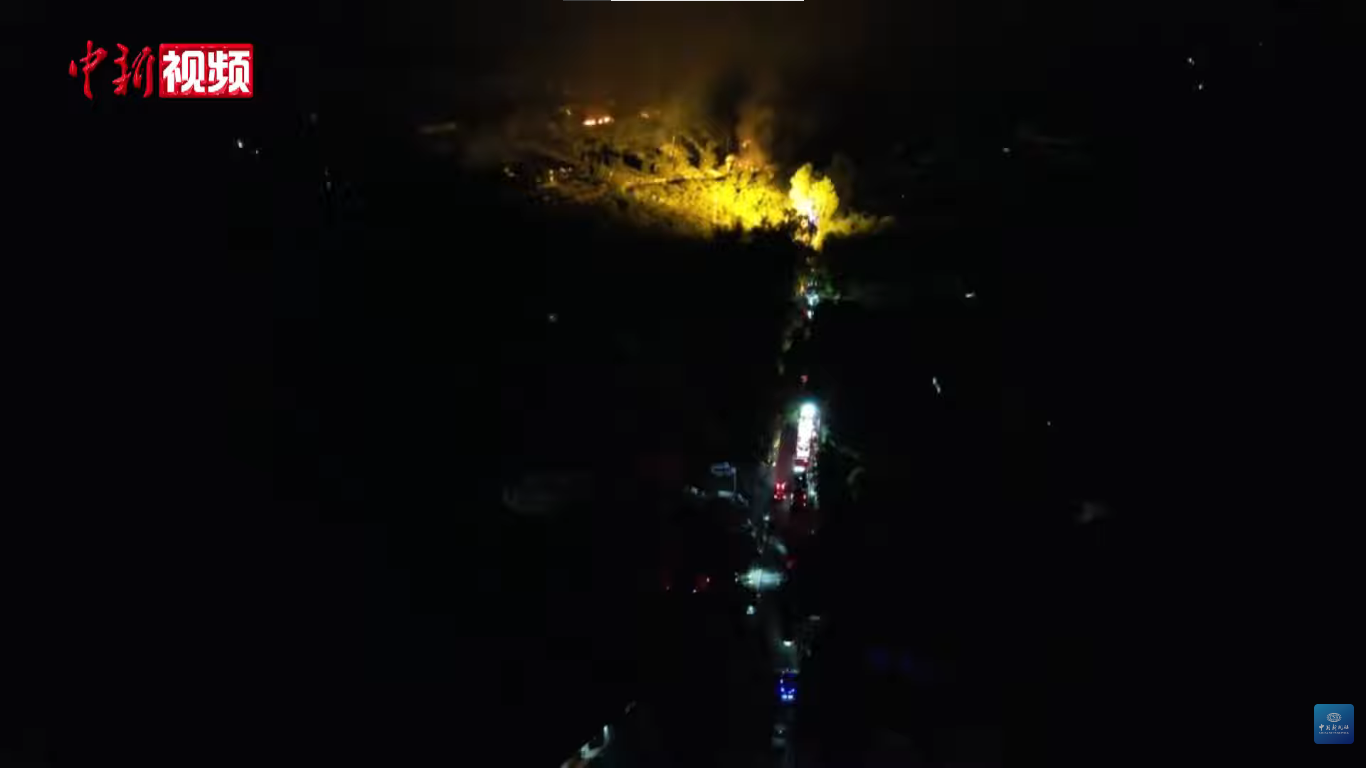
The factory building, which was still ablaze on the night of the explosion.

The explosion occurred at about 16:43 on 4 May 2026 in a workshop of Huasheng (Chinese: 华盛; pinyin: huáshèng) Fireworks Manufacturing and Display Co. in Liuyang. Footage published or cited by the media showed large plumes of smoke rising from the site and extensive damage to the factory buildings. Nearby residents reported that windows and doors in their homes were shattered or deformed by the blast, and that debris had been thrown onto nearby roads.

The casualty figures changed as search and rescue work continued. Xinhua reported that, after an initial search, 21 people had been killed and 61 injured by 08:00 on 5 May. Later reports put the death toll at 37, with the number of injured changing to 51 with one person remaining missing. Of the 51 people hospitalised, 5 people are in serious condition.

== Rescue and investigation ==
After the explosion, Hunan authorities activated an emergency response plan and established an on-site rescue command. Five rescue teams comprising 482 personnel were initially dispatched to the site, and medical resources from Hunan province and Changsha were mobilised to treat the injured. The Ministry of Emergency Management sent specialists to guide rescue and emergency response work.

Because two black-powder warehouses at the plant posed a high risk of secondary explosions, rescuers established isolation belts and firebreaks and used spraying and humidification measures to reduce hazards. Robots, drones and search teams were used during the operation.

Police detained the person in charge of Huasheng Fireworks Manufacturing and Display Co. after the explosion. The cause of the explosion remains under investigation. According to state media cited by Reuters, China's State Council set up an accident investigation team following the explosion. Eight people have been summoned for questioning on suspicion of causing the explosion.

Huasheng Fireworks Manufacturing had repeatedly been cited for safety risks in the past, with a fine of 15,000 yuan ($2,205) in January 2026 for two safety violations. The violations involved mixing reducing agents and oxidisers in its workshop, significantly elevating the risk of an explosion.

== Response ==
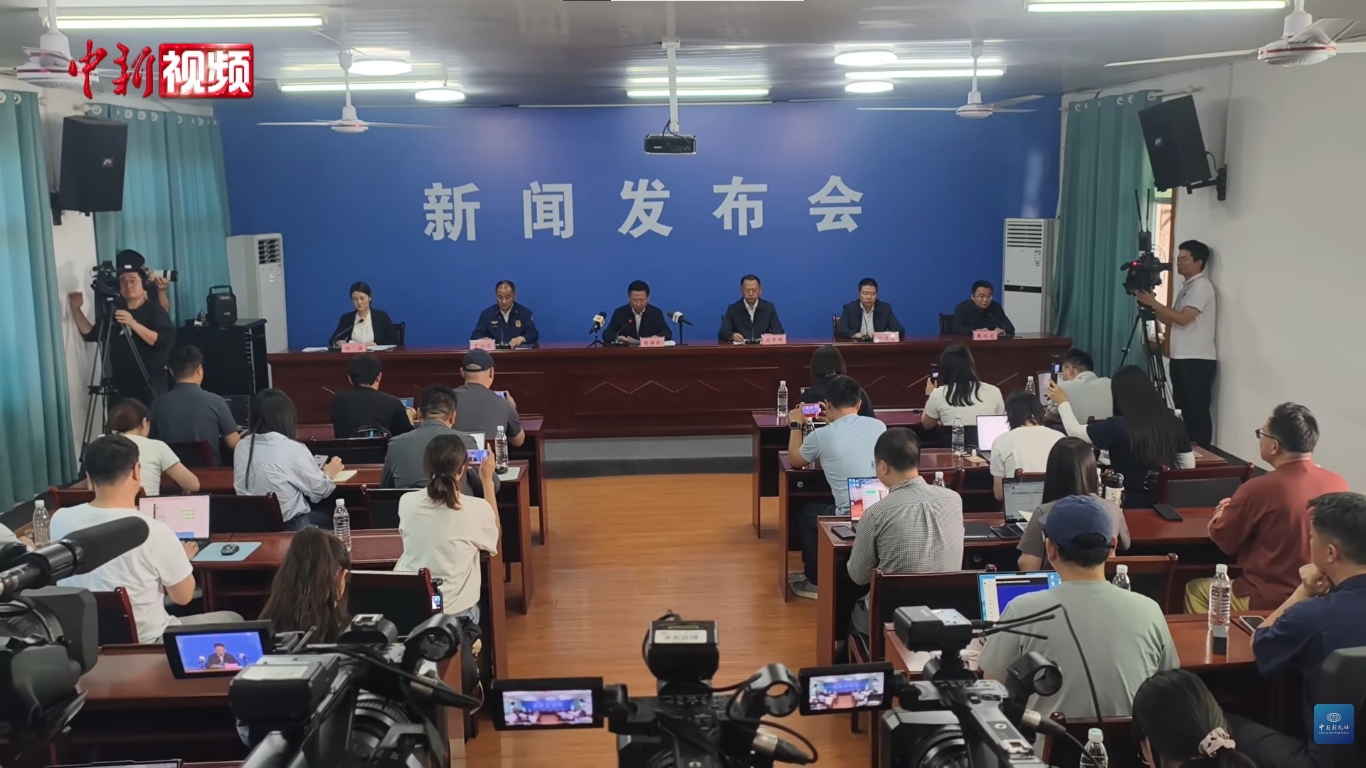
The official press conference held following the explosion

Xi Jinping, the General Secretary of the Chinese Communist Party, issued instructions after the explosion, calling for searches for missing people, treatment of the injured, proper handling of the aftermath, a prompt investigation into the cause and strict accountability. Premier Li Qiang also issued instructions calling for rescue work, prevention of secondary disasters and an investigation in accordance with law and regulations.

Vice Premier Zhang Guoqing travelled to Liuyang to guide the emergency rescue and response work. Local authorities ordered all fireworks and firecracker manufacturers in Liuyang to suspend production for safety inspections.

== See also ==
- List of fireworks accidents and incidents
- List of industrial disasters
