= Kaiming dynasty =

Kaiming
- Capital: Chengdu
- Government: Monarchy

The Kaiming dynasty (Chinese: 開明王朝; pinyin: Kāimíng Wángcháo) was a dynasty of the Ancient Kingdom of Shu in Chinese history, founded in 666 BC by Bieling, who came from the State of Chu. The Kaiming dynasty lasted twelve generations until the Qin conquest. Legend has it that Bieling had died in Chu and his body floated upriver to Shu, whereupon he came back to life. While at Shu, he was successful in managing a flood, after which Duyu abdicated in his favor. A later account states that the Kaiming kings occupied the far south of Shu before travelling up the Min River and taking over the throne from Duyu.

== See also ==
- Shu
- Chengdu
