= Chinese fireworks =

Type of optical toy box

Chinese fireworks or paper fireworks, also known by the French terms feux pyriques or feux arabesques, is a type of optical toy box that displays pictures with twinkling light effects. The pictures are printed or painted on paper, parchment or cardboard plates, and contain perforated elements. A wheel with a spiraling pattern on coloured transparent paper is made to rotate between a light source and the picture plates, causing the light that shines through the perforations to flicker and to change colour.

The box is usually a wooden cabinet with a drawer to store the plates and a theatre window above, with a slit to hold a picture. Some versions have two slits so the pictures can be changed without much interruption. Dutch Chinese fireworks picture plates are square and found in two sizes: 32 cm and 40 cm. The wheel is usually set in motion through a clockwork mechanism. Some versions had a cylinder instead of the wheel. The light source used to be candles or oil-lamps.

Chinese fireworks creates an effect, the effect was used to create the impression of flames, fireworks, fountains, sun rays, city lights, et cetera. Many other pictures displayed abstract patterns. Also coats of arms and short texts are among the known extant plates.

== History ==
Chinese fireworks were probably developed from the raree shows that were popular in the 17th and 18th century, which regularly featured coloured transparent paper behind cutouts and perforations that were lit from behind with candles.

Most Chinese fireworks seem to have been made in The Netherlands between 1775 and 1800. It was also popular in England in the 19th century. Hardly any large Chinese fireworks boxes were made after 1850. Simpler versions were produced for children, or they could craft their own by following instructions in children's periodicals.

Editions of the Encyclopædia Britannica from 1810 to 1823 contained an extensive explanation of how one could produce several sorts of "optical imitations of fire-works".

The principle of the Chinese fireworks was adapted for magic lantern slides. The chromatrope can be regarded as a further development of this technique.

== See also ==
- Liuyang fireworks
- Iron flower
