= Duyu =

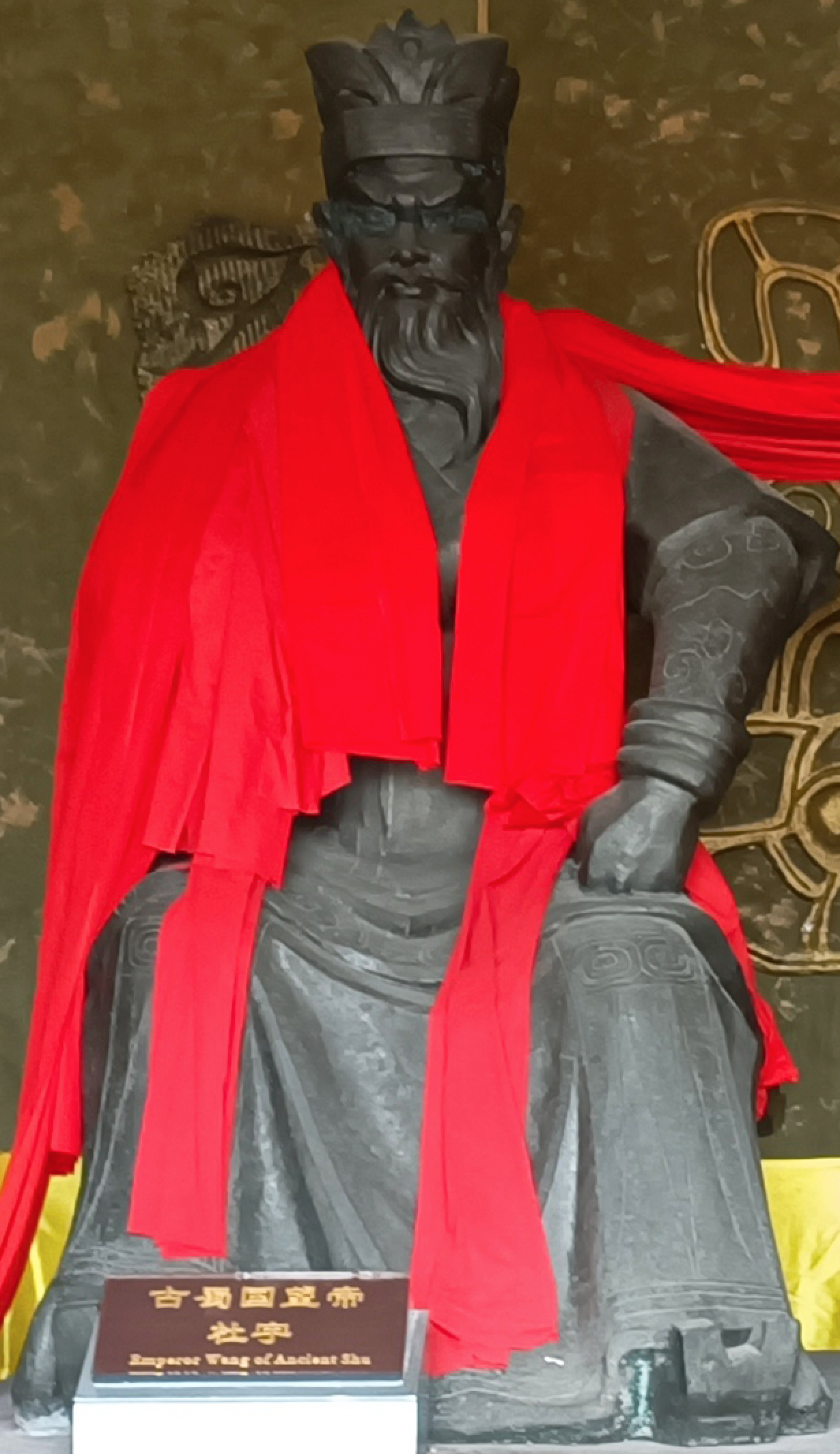
Modern image of Duyu in a temple in Chengdu

Duyu (Chinese: 杜宇, meaning cuckoo) was a legendary ruler of the ancient Kingdom of Shu in China. Accounts of his life are essentially mythological in nature, but some scholars believe that he existed as a person or as representation of a dynasty. He was the fourth ruler of Shu, and was said to have ruled Shu for over a hundred years.

== Legend ==
The story of Duyu is found in the Annals of the Kings of Shu (蜀王本纪, which only survives as quotations in other works), Chronicles of Huayang by Chang Qu, and miscellaneous notes. According to legends, Duyu was from Zhuti (朱提, Zhaotong in modern Yunnan) after having fallen from the sky. He married a woman named Liang Li (梁利) who was born in a well. He became the king of Shu after the previous king Yufu died. He ruled from his capital, Pi (郫, west of modern day Chengdu). He taught the people of Shu agriculture, and upon his death he transformed into a cuckoo. The cuckoo's yearly reappearance in spring thus reminds his people to plough the fields as Duyu had once taught them.

Duyu's successor was Bieling (emperor name: Kaiming), Duyu having abdicated the throne either in shame having cuckolded Bieling or in recognition of Bieling's worthiness having tamed the floods. Alternatively, Bieling may have usurped the throne which led to Duyu's transformation into a cuckoo.

In some versions, Duyu fought an evil dragon of Minjiang River a girl prisoner. Having freed the girl and tamed the river, Duyu married the girl (Long Mei). In this story, Duyu was imprisoned by one of his ministers who wanted Long Mei for himself. Duyu then in prison where he transformed into a cuckoo. He then returned to his palace where his wife also became a bird.

Despite the mythical elements of his biography, he is generally accepted by Chinese as well as some Western scholars as having either existed or as representative of a dynasty.
