= Iron flower =

Type of Chinese firework

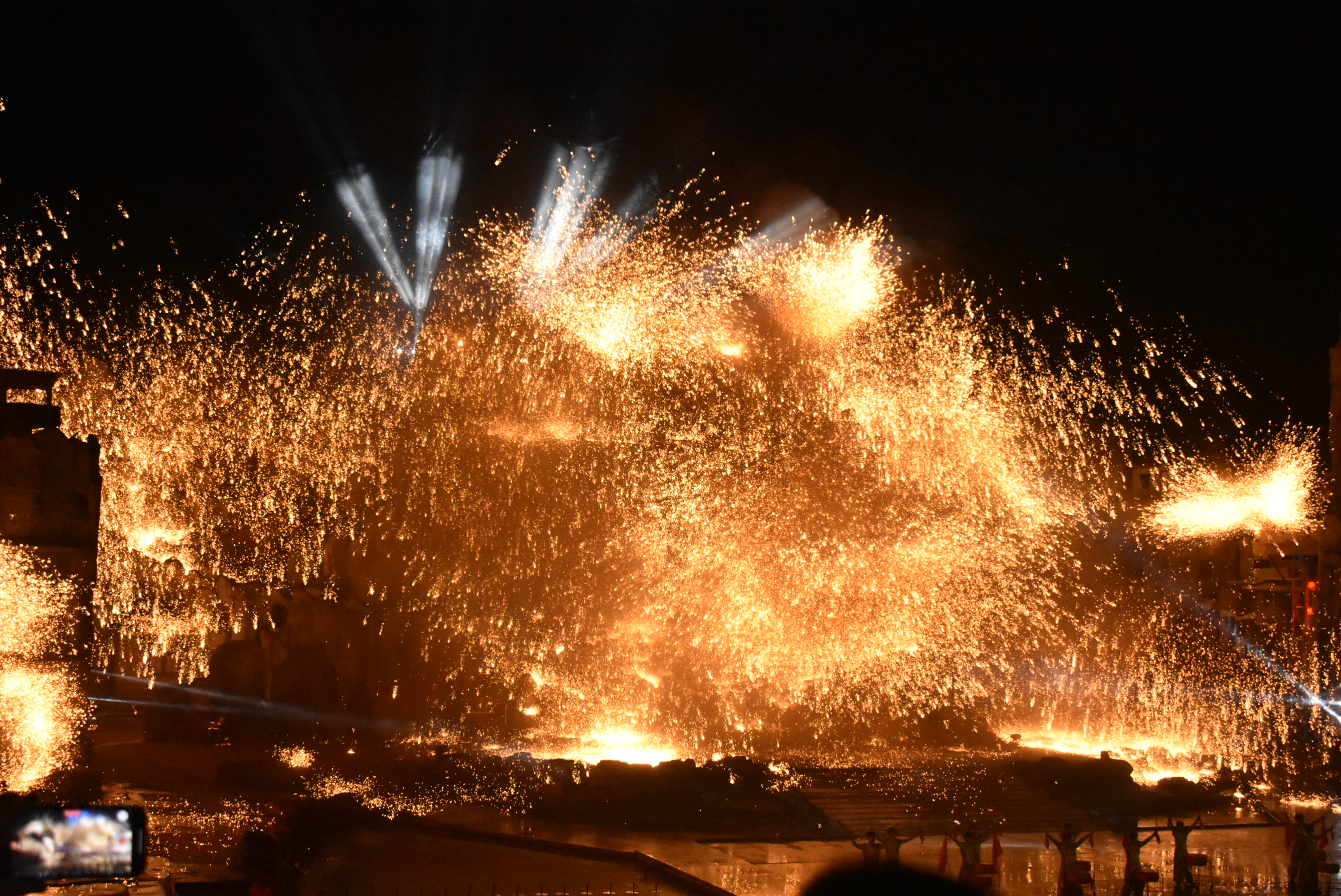
- Iron flower national intangible cultural heritage
- Chinese: 打铁花
- Traditional Chinese: 打鐵花
Transcriptions
Standard Mandarin
- Hanyu Pinyin: datiehua

Iron flower, also known as iron tree, is a type of firework made of hammered molten iron that is popular in Henan, Shanxi, Hebei and related regions. It is part of China's intangible cultural heritage.

Ironwork is a large-scale traditional folk firework. It is a performance technique discovered by ancient Chinese craftsmen during the process of casting utensils. It began in the Northern Song dynasty and flourished in the Ming and Qing dynasties. It has a history of more than a thousand years. Iron flower is mostly spread across the middle and lower reaches of the Yellow River, and is most popular in Henan and Shanxi. The iron flowers of Kaifeng are reputed to be the best of the ten great folk arts in the Yellow River Basin. When performing iron flower, the performer needs to choose an open venue without flammable materials and ensure that there is enough distance to protect the audience and the surrounding environment. Then an iron block is placed into a high-temperature puddling furnace and heated to about 1600 degrees Celsius to melt it into molten iron. During this process, the furnace temperature needs to be constantly observed and adjusted to ensure the quality of the molten iron. Wearing a full set of protective equipment, including fire-retardant fabric, gloves and goggles, the performer uses an iron spoon or shovel to scoop the high-temperature molten iron and throw it into the air with force. The molten iron splashes in the air and cools rapidly, reacting with oxygen in the air to form countless sparks.

In June 2008, the iron flower declared by Queshan County, Henan Province was approved by the State Council of the People's Republic of China and included in the second batch of national intangible cultural heritage list, with heritage number X-88.

== History and culture ==
Iron flower performance shot in the "Situ Town" scenic spot in Shanxi, China

The "iron flower" can be traced back to the Spring and Autumn period and the Warring States period. It was originally a way for farmers to celebrate the harvest and exorcise evil spirits and pray for blessings. Farmers believed that by making iron flowers, they could drive away evil, bless peace, and usher in a new harvest season. At the beginning of each year, before opening their doors for business, craftsmen would go to the Laojun Temple (老君庙; Lǎojūn Miào) and the Fire God Temple (火神庙; Huǒshén Miào) in the county to offer sacrifices. They prayed to Laojun and the Fire God to bless them with peace, prosperity, and prosperity for the whole year. The iron flower performance began in the evening. Most of the people who participated in the iron flower performance were craftsmen from various shops. Before starting the iron flower performance, they had to kneel down and pray to the gods for peace and avoid burns.

Taoist priests support and participate in the craftsmen's sacrificial activities. Taoist priests either provide a place for ironwork (mostly open space belonging to the temple), or provide money and goods. When craftsmen perform sacrifices and parades, Taoist priests often organize musical instruments such as sheng, xiao, flutes, silk, gongs and drums to cheer up the craftsmen. In normal times, craftsmen cast bells, bowls, incense burners, braziers, etc. for Taoist priests for free. When holding major Taoist celebrations, Taoist priests will also provide money and gifts, and invite craftsmen to hold "iron flowers" to add luster to Taoism. This has promoted the development of the "iron flowers" activity. Obviously, the original purpose of "iron flowers" is to show the style of the industry, please the masses, and expand its influence, which is equivalent to an advertisement. The second is to seek auspiciousness, using the homophonic pronunciation of "花" and "发" to take the meaning of "making flowers and flowers, the more you fight, the more they bloom", which symbolizes a prosperous career.

Queshan iron flowers began in the Northern Song and flourished in the Ming and Qing dynasties. Queshan was considered a Taoist holy site; along with the Wudang Mountains, Hubei and the Tong Mountains, Biyang County, it was considered one of the three Taoist mountains of the Central Plains. Making iron flowers was originally a ritual activity for alchemy Taoist priests to pray for blessings, ward off disasters, and exorcise evil spirits from homes. It was also an activity for folk craftsmen of gold, silver, copper, iron, and tin to join the Taoist priests in worshipping the common ancestor Taishang Laojun every year during the beginning of the Spring Festival. The ceremony held has both the characteristics of Taoist mysticism and the metal craftsmen's professions.

After the fall of the Northern Song dynasty, the iron flower spread across the country as the Queshan people moved south and north, forming different styles. During the Ming and Qing dynasties, due to the government's promotion and support from all walks of life, Queshan iron flower reached its peak, and expanded from the original opening ceremony of craftsmen or Taoist sacrificial activities such as the birthdays of the Jade Emperor, Taishang Laojun, and the Queen Mother to ex-voto, promotions, marriage, high school, etc. General festive events such as home building festivals. In the course of its local spread, Queshan Tiehua has continuously absorbed various artistic elements such as setting off firecrackers, setting off fireworks, and playing dragon lanterns, gradually forming a unique performance style that is grand, majestic, festive and auspicious. In the early years of the Republic of China's , Queshan iorn flower was on the verge of extinction due to wars and disasters. After the founding of the People's Republic of China, Queshan iron flower was performed only three times in 1952, 1956 and 1962. In 1988, Yang Jianjun proposed to the county leaders to hold an iron flower during the Spring Festival. This suggestion was highly valued and supported by the county leaders, so the Queshan iron flowers was once again exhibited before an audience.

== Regional Variants ==
=== Changzhi Iron Flower ===
Changzhi Iron Flower, also known as tiě líhuā (铁犁花; 'iron plow flowers'), is a traditional festive performance from the Shangdang region of Shanxi Province. It originated as a ritual to express sympathy for lost souls and to pray for rebirth, with molten iron splashed onto old pagoda trees to symbolize "iron trees blooming." Over time, it evolved into a folk performance seen during festivals such as the Lantern Festival and Shennong Festival. Performers strike molten iron into the air using wooden boards, creating showers of sparks accompanied by figures like “fire umbrellas,” “fire bulls,” and “fire dragons.”

=== Great Wall Iron Flower ===
Great Wall Iron Flower is a traditional folk art originating from the area near the Great Wall in Yanqing District, Beijing. It developed from sacrificial rituals practiced by ironworkers and has been passed down through generations, forming different techniques such as "flower striking," "flower pouring," and "flower pounding." Named routines include "Two Dragons Playing with a Pearl", "Fire Tree and Silver Flowers", and "Hand-Held Thunder," which involves performers striking molten iron at approximately 1,600°C with bare hands and no protective equipment. Recognized as a district-level intangible cultural heritage of Yanqing, Great Wall Iron Flower has been performed in several Chinese provinces, including Guangxi, Hunan, Hubei, Zhejiang, and Shanxi. The performance group has grown from around a dozen members to over 40 in recent years.

== Customary form ==
Before the iron flower show, a two-story octagonal shed more than ten feet high is set up in the center of the wide square. The first floor is 4 meters high and the second floor is 1.5 meters high. A pole more than ten feet high was erected in the center, and firecrackers are hung on the pole. A puddling furnace for melting molten iron is set up next to it. The long stick used by the craftsman is an iron spoon as thick as a fist and as long as a ruler.

When performing iron flower, the craftsman holds the upper part of the iron spoon filled with molten iron in one hand and the rod without molten iron in the other hand, quickly scooping up the high-temperature molten iron and throwing it into the air with force. More than a dozen craftsmen shuttle back and forth to create iron flowers of different shapes and sizes, and the audience can enjoy the spectacular sight of sparks blooming in the night sky. Blooming like flowers and falling like meteor showers. Firecrackers are blasting, shaking the earth. Whenever iron flower is performed, the nearby dragon lantern festival will bring dragon lanterns to add to the fun. When the iron flower slowly descended in the air, it formed a colorful flower, and the dragon lantern shuttled through the iron flower, just like a dragon flying in the flowers. This scene is not only visually impactful, but also full of vitality.

As an ancient folk art, iron flower embodies rich historical and cultural connotations. It not only shows the exquisite skills of ancient Chinese iron smelting technology, but also carries people's yearning and pursuit for a better life.

During the 2021 Spring Festival, the iron flower performance at the Long live Mountain Scenic Area in Kaifeng was broadcast on CCTV News. The red molten iron shot into the sky, and the spectacular scene made the audience cheer. Iron Flower is a famous traditional folk performance in Kaifeng, an intangible cultural heritage item in Henan, and one of the top ten folk arts in the Yellow River Basin.

== See also ==
- China's Intangible Cultural Heritage
- Intangible cultural heritage
- Chinese fireworks
- Liuyang fireworks
