= Guandu, Liuyang =

Guandu Town 官渡镇
- Town
- Location in Hunan
- Coordinates: 28°21′04″N 113°52′53″E
- Country: People's Republic of China
- Province: Hunan
- Prefecture-level city: Changsha
- County-level city: Liuyang

Area
  - Total: 106.3 km^{2} (41.0 sq mi)

Population (2015)
  - Total: 31,300
  - Density: 294/km^{2} (763/sq mi)
- Time zone: UTC+8 (China Standard)
- Postal code: 410304
- Area code: 0731

Guandu Town (simplified Chinese: 官渡镇; traditional Chinese: 官渡鎮; pinyin: Guāndù Zhèn) is a rural town in Liuyang City, Hunan Province, People's Republic of China. As of the 2015 census it had a population of 31,300 and an area of 106.3 square kilometres (41.0 sq mi). It is surrounded by Dahu Town on the north, Yanxi Town on the west, Zhangfang Town on the east, and Yonghe on the south.

== History ==
In 222, under the Eastern Wu (222–280), the county government seat was set up here. At that time, it known as "Juling" (居陵). Guandu town once served as the administrative centre of former Liuyang county.

== Administrative divisions ==
The town is divided into five villages and three communities, which include the following areas:

- Xinyunshan Community (新云山社区)
- Nanyue Community (南岳社区)
- Zhushan Community (竹山社区)
- Guanyintang Village (观音塘村)
- Tianjiao Village (田郊村)
- Binghe Village (兵和村)
- Zhulian Village (竹联村)

== Geography ==
The Daxi River (大溪河) flows through the town north to south.

Mount Dajin (大金山) is a mountain in the town.

== Economy ==
The principal industries in the area are agriculture and forestry.

== Education ==
Guandu Middle School, and No.4 senior highschool of Liuyang is settled here.

== Transportation ==
=== Expressway ===
The Changsha–Liuyang Expressway, from Changsha, running west to east through the town to Jiangxi.

=== Provincial Highway ===
The Provincial Highway S309 runs west to east through the town.

== Attraction ==
Guandu Ancient Town is a dominant tourist attraction in the town.

== Notable people ==
- Ouyang Xuan (欧阳玄; 1283–1358), a Yuan dynasty (1271–1368) historian and writer.
- Kong Shiquan (孔石泉; 1909–2002), a lieutenant general in the Chinese People's Liberation Army.
