= Chengdu–Kunming railway =

Railway line in China

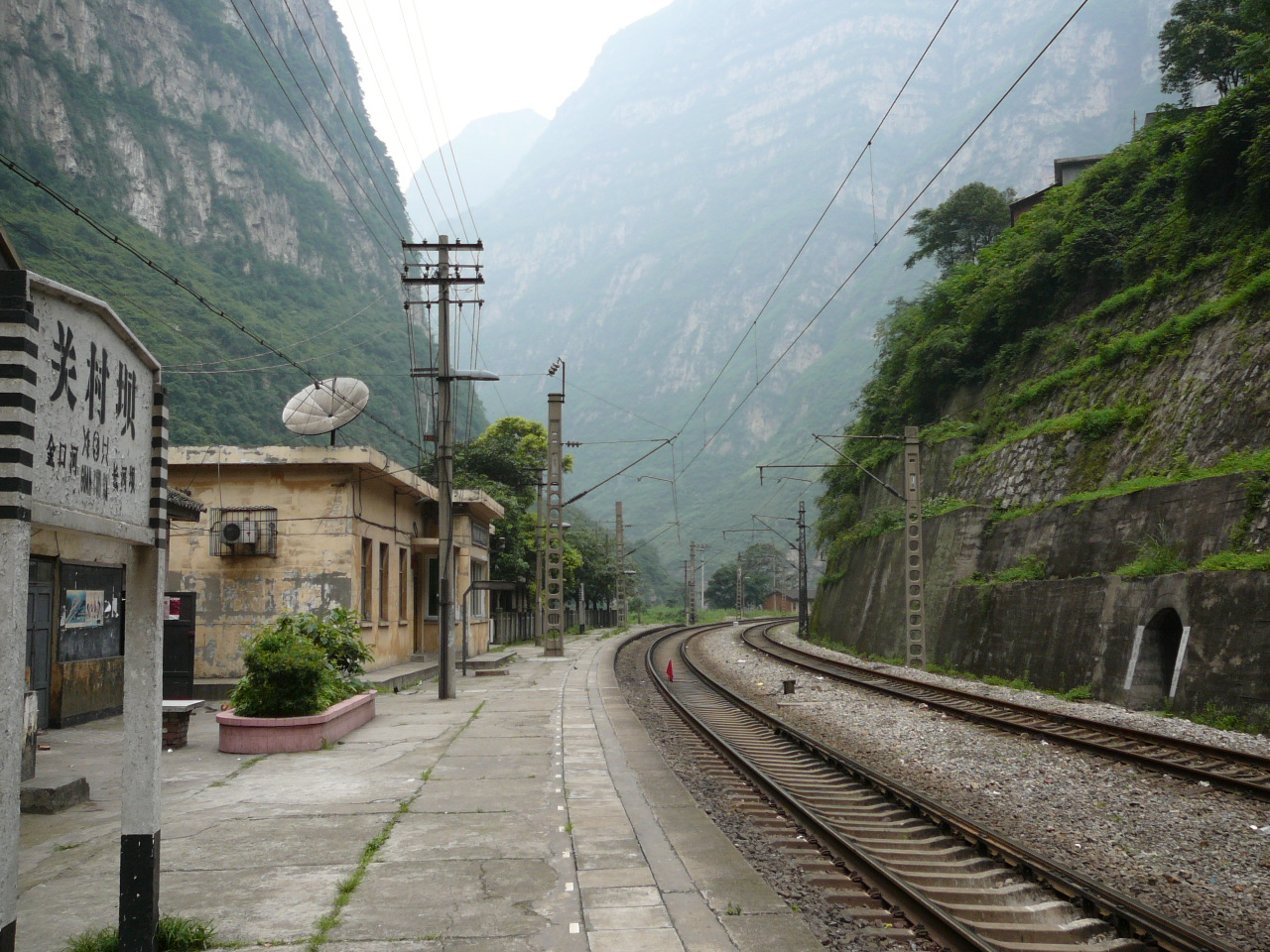
- Guancunba Station, on the old line next to the Dadu River (downstream of the Niuri River Valley), in Jinkouhe District, Leshan

Overview
- Other name: Chengkun railway
- Native name: 成昆铁路
- Status: Operational
- Owner: China Railway
- Locale: Southwest China
- Termini: Chengdu; Kunming

Service
- Type: Heavy rail
- Operators: China Railway Chengdu Group; China Railway Kunming Group

History
- Opened: 1 January 1971
- Completed: 1 July 1970
- Closure of Huapengzi–Huangguayuan section of old line: 26 May 2020
- Completion of new line: 26 December 2022

Technical
- Line length: 1,083 km (673 mi)
- Number of tracks: 2
- Track gauge: 1,435 mm (4 ft 8 1/2 in) standard gauge
- Electrification: 25 kV 50 Hz AC overhead line
- Operating speed: 200 km/h (120 mph)

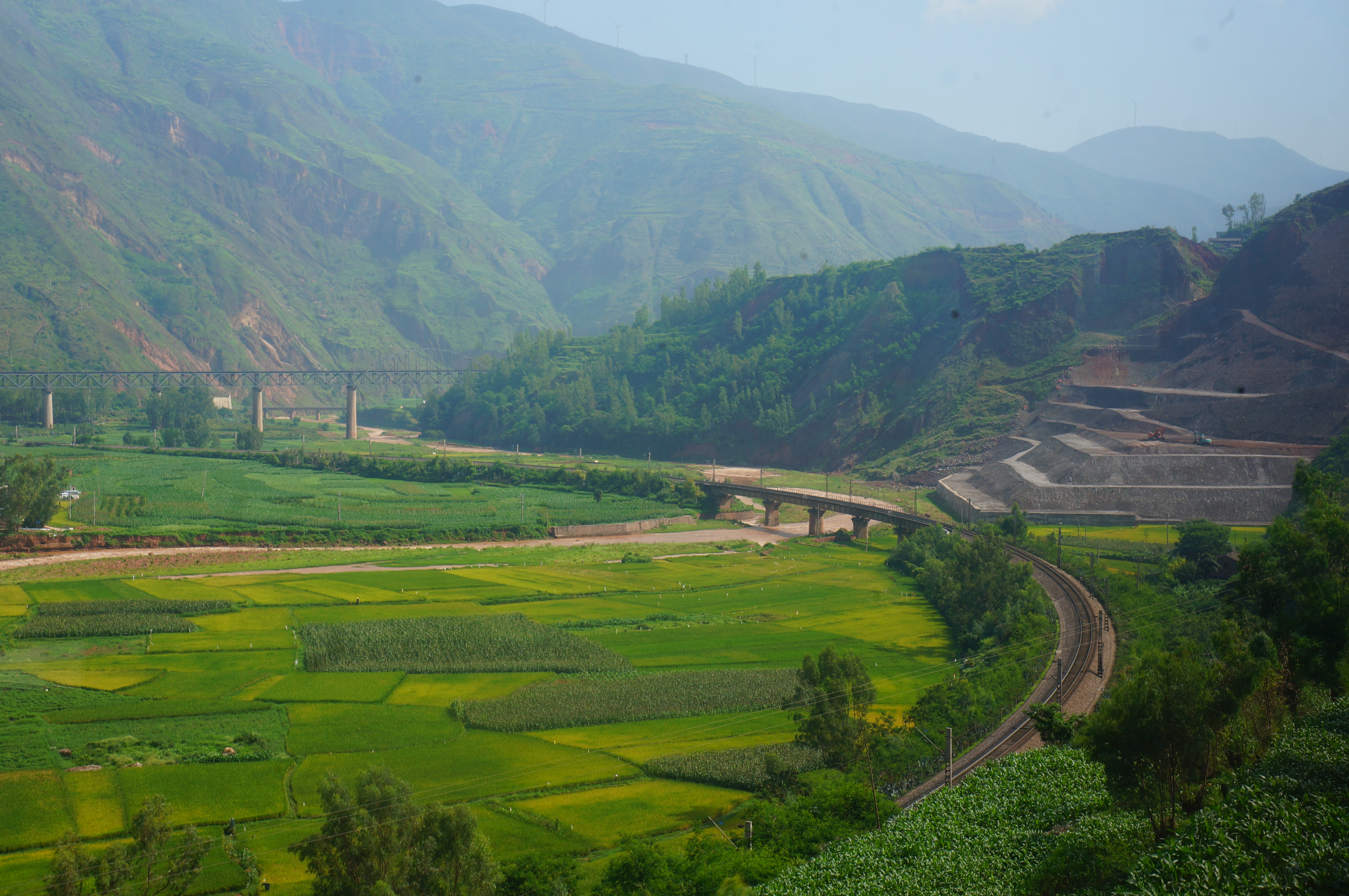
Fala Spiral of Chengdu–Kunming railway

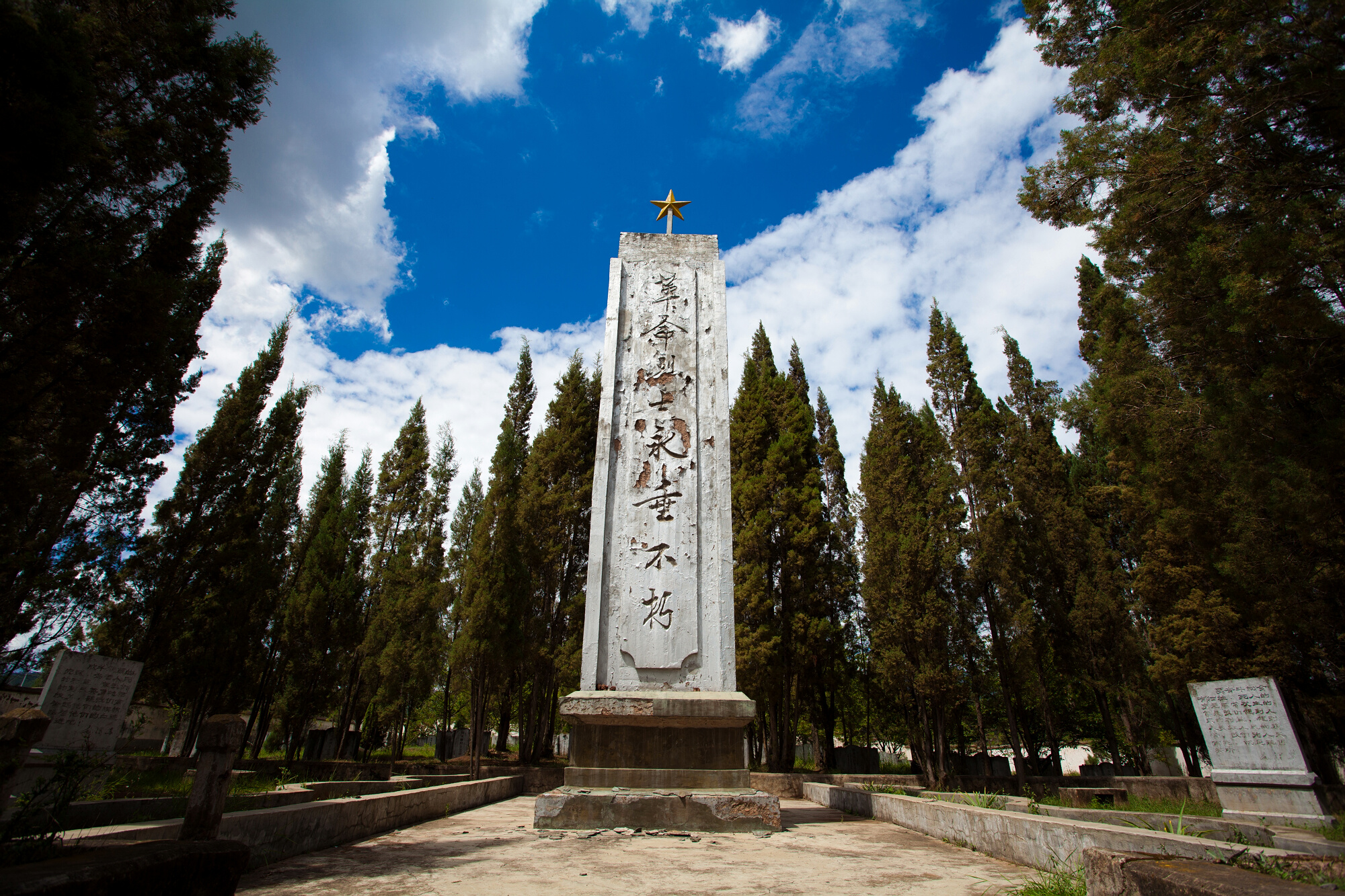
A memorial for workers who lost their lives in the construction of the railway in Jianshui County

The Chengdu–Kunming railway or Chengkun railway (simplified Chinese: 成昆铁路; traditional Chinese: 成昆鐵路; pinyin: chéngkūn tiělù), is a major trunkline railroad in southwestern China between Chengdu, the capital of Sichuan Province and Kunming, the capital of Yunnan Province. The line runs through the Dadu River and Anning River basins in southwestern Sichuan, which are enclosed by high mountains, canyons and major rivers, and the Longchuan River basin in northern Yunnan. It crosses a major geological fault zone. The mountains along the line are steep and the terrain and geology are extremely complex.

The idea of building a railway between Chengdu and Kunming originated in the late 19th century, but concrete surveys were not conducted until the 1930s and 40s. However, the project was ultimately thwarted by the rugged mountains between Sichuan and Yunnan provinces. Surveys began in the early 1950s, and after comparing and evaluating three main route options—western, central, and eastern—the western route was ultimately chosen due to factors such as the Panzhihua steel base and the natural resources along the route. Construction began in the summer of 1958, but was halted after the completion of the Chengdu-Qinglongchang section in early 1960. Construction resumed in 1964 as a key project of the Third Front construction. The Cultural Revolution subsequently hampered progress in the section under the Second Railway Bureau, but normal construction resumed at the end of 1969. The entire line opened to traffic on 1 July 1970 and began operation on 1 January 1971.

The definition of the Chengdu–Kunming Railway route has undergone several changes. Since 29 September 2021, China Railway has designated the Chengdu–Yizi section as the "Chengdu–Panzhihua Section of the Chengdu-Kunming railway," the Huangguayuan–Kunming section as the "Yuanping–Kunming section of the Chengdu–Kunming railway," and the newly built double-track section originally between Emeishan and Guangtong, now part of the Chengdu–Kunming railway, as the Emeishan–Guangtong railway. After the Emeishan–Guangtong railway fully opened to traffic on 26 December 2022, the section of the existing Chengdu–Kunming railway south of Emeishan mainly serves freight and short-distance passenger transport. Currently, three pairs of public-service slow trains operate daily along the entire Chengdu–Kunming railway, with two pairs passing through the Liangshan area becoming a vital lifeline for local residents.

The Chengdu-Kunming railway passes through areas rich in various mineral deposits, and the Dadu River, Yalong River, and Jinsha River basins along its route possess abundant forest and hydropower resources, showing great potential for development. Furthermore, the line traverses areas inhabited by ethnic minorities in Southwest China, playing a significant role in improving transportation conditions, strengthening ethnic unity, promoting economic development, and advancing national defense in the region. Because the Chengdu-Kunming Railway traverses rugged mountains, many construction workers lost their lives during its construction, and several martyrs' cemeteries exist along the railway line to commemorate these sacrifices. During operation and maintenance, the line has also been repeatedly affected by natural disasters, resulting in accidents. This arduous journey has also given rise to the "Chengdu–Kunming Spirit." Today, some bridges, tunnels, and sections of the railway along the route have been designated as cultural relics protection units by the local governments, such as the "Renhe section of the Chengdu–Kunming railway."

== Route ==
The Chengdu-Kunming Railway starts from Chengdu, Sichuan in the north and ends in Kunming, Yunnan in the south. The actual length of the line is 1,083.32 km (673.14 mi) and the operating length is 1,100 km (680 mi). In terms of technical requirements, the line exceeds the standard of the existing railway trunk lines in Southwest China: the restricted gradient is 0.6%, (Note: The maximum allowable gradient for a section of track hauled by a single locomotive.) the gradient north of Xichang reaches 1.6%, (Note: The maximum allowable gradient for sections pulled by two or more locomotives.) and the gradient south of Xichang reaches 1.2%. The minimum curve radius in general sections is 600 m (2,000 ft), and in difficult sections it is 400 m (1,300 ft). Only a few curves with radii of 300 m (980 ft) and 350 m (1,150 ft) are retained between Shawan station and Gonghe station due to the consideration of future rerouting. The entire line was initially a single-track railway and diesel locomotives were used to haul trains. The tunnels were designed for electrified railway clearance, and the design of the line between Guangtong and Kunming provided for the construction of a second track, After the completion of the Chengdu–Kunming double-track railway and renovation project, the section from Chengdu to Emei (specifically to Yangang station) and the section from Wenquan to Kunming was rebuilt as a double-track railway with an operating speed of 160 km/h (99 mph).

The Chengdu–Kunming railway crosses mountains four times, passes through spirals seven times, crosses the Niuri River thirteen times, crosses the Anning River eight times, and crosses the Longchuan River and its tributaries, the Chuxiong River and the Guangtong River forty-nine times. When the line was opened to traffic, there were 427 tunnels and open-cut tunnels and 991 bridges, with a total length of 433.7 km (269.5 mi), accounting for 41.6% of the total length of the line. Among them, the Shamalada Tunnel was the longest tunnel built for a railway in China at that time, and the steel truss Sanduizi Bridge and the stone arch Yixiantian Bridge were also the largest spans of their kind in China at that time.

The line connects with some other railway trunk lines in China's railway transportation network: in Chengdu it connects with the Baoji–Chengdu railway, the Chengdu–Chongqing railway and the Dazhou–Chengdu railway; in Kunming it connects with the Shanghai–Kunming railway, the Nanning–Kunming railway and the Kunming–Hekou railway, and in Guangtong it also connects with the Guangtong–Dali railway.

=== Overview of the route ===
The Chengdu–Kunming railway originates from Chengdu, passes through the Chengdu Plain at an altitude of about 500 m (1,600 ft), and then goes south through Pengshan, Meishan, and Jiajiang. Starting from Emeishan, it goes up the left bank of the Dadu River valley, passes through Ebian Yi and Jinkouhe, and then turns into the Niuri River valley. It passes through Ganluo and Puxiong, and uses the Shamalada Tunnel at an altitude of 2,280 m (7,480 ft) to cross the watershed and go down the Sunshui River. It passes through Xide and Lugu, and then turns into the Anning River valley to reach Xichang. From Xichang, it continues down the Anning River and Yalong River, passes through Dechang and Miyi to the Jinsha River valley at an altitude of about 1,000 m (3,300 ft). After that, it goes up the Longchuan River valley, passes through Yuanmou, Lufeng, and Anning to reach the Yunnan Plateau at an altitude of about 1,900 m (6,200 ft) where Kunming is located.

The railway has a complex and rugged terrain. There are cliffs hundreds of meters high in the valleys of the Dadu River and Jinsha River, and several sections of steep riverbeds in the valleys of the Niuri River and Sunshui River. In terms of geology, the area along the line has been affected by the geological tectonic movements of the past, and new geological tectonic movements are also active, resulting in various adverse physical and geological phenomena. More than 500 km (310 mi) of the line are located in the seismic zone of intensity 7–9. The industry has always used the term "geological museum" to describe the complex geological conditions along the line. In addition, due to the influence of the location, region, and altitude, the climate of the areas through which the line passes is diverse: the Sichuan Basin is a hot and humid climate, but the valleys of the Dadu River and Jinsha River are a hot and dry climate, while the Yunnan Plateau is a mild climate. Therefore, in the process of completing the project, both the survey and design and the construction of the project faced great difficulties.

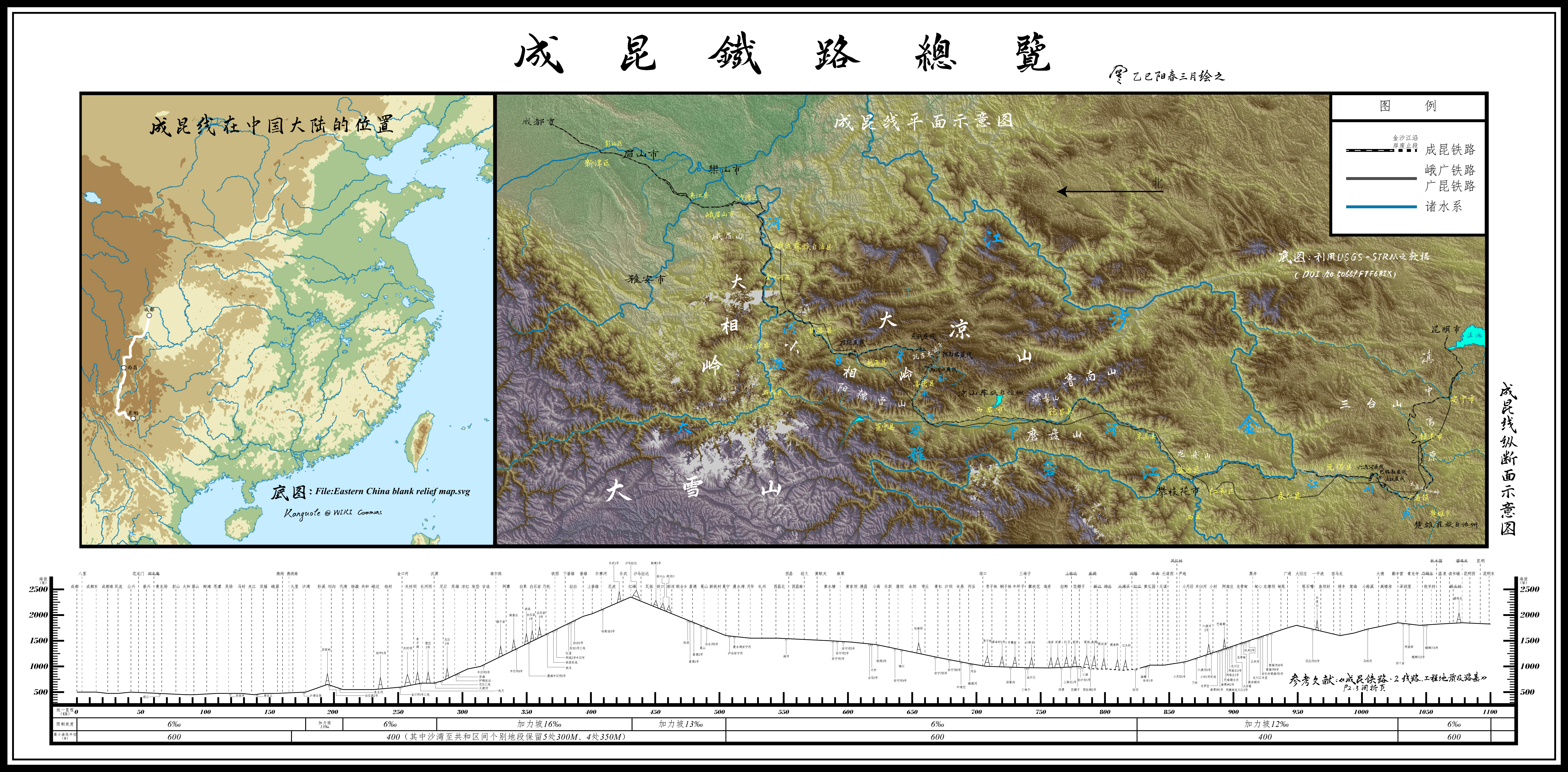
Overview map of the Chengdu–Kunming railway

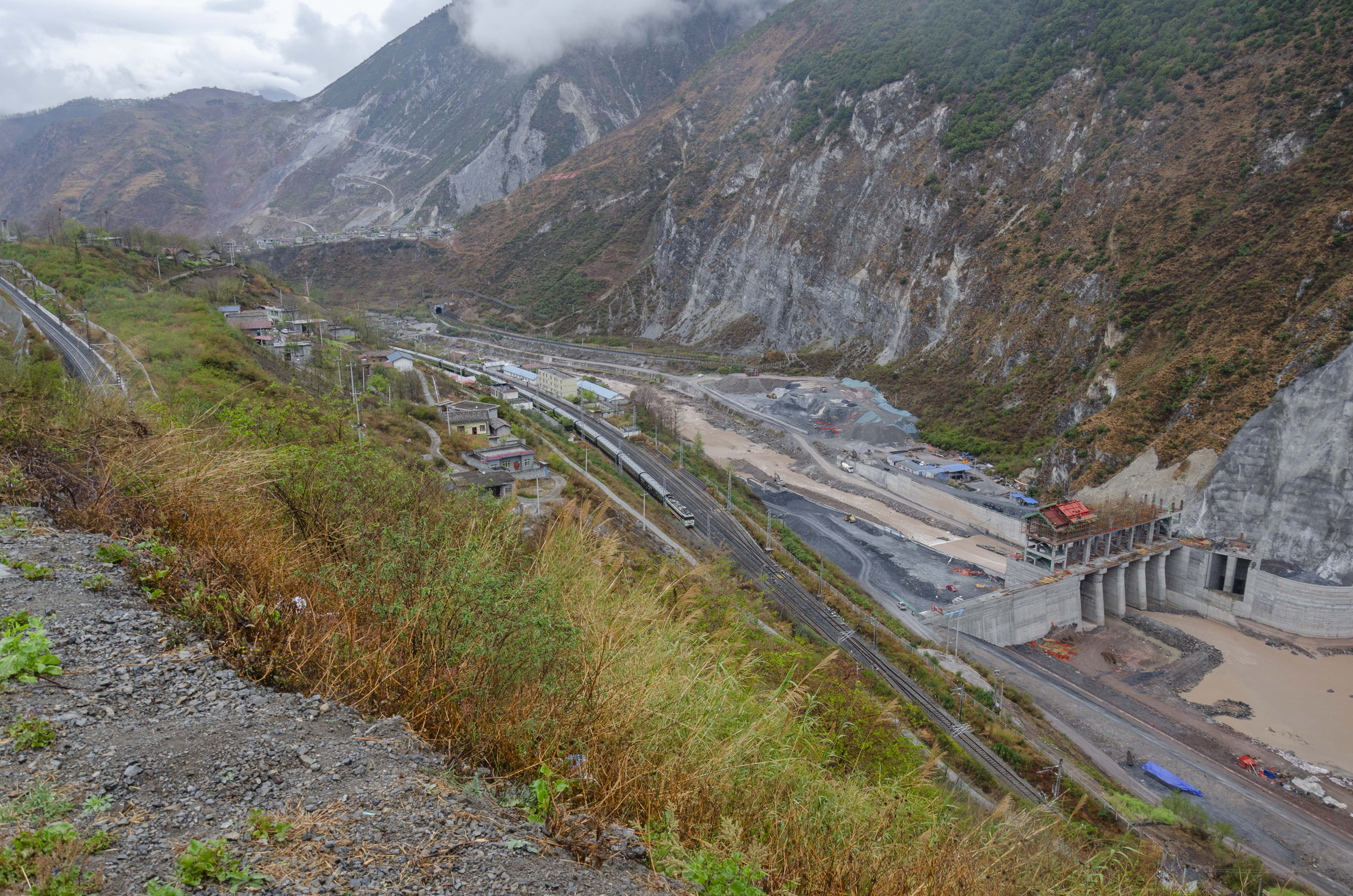
The Naituo extension line is located on the mountainside on one side of the Niuri river valley

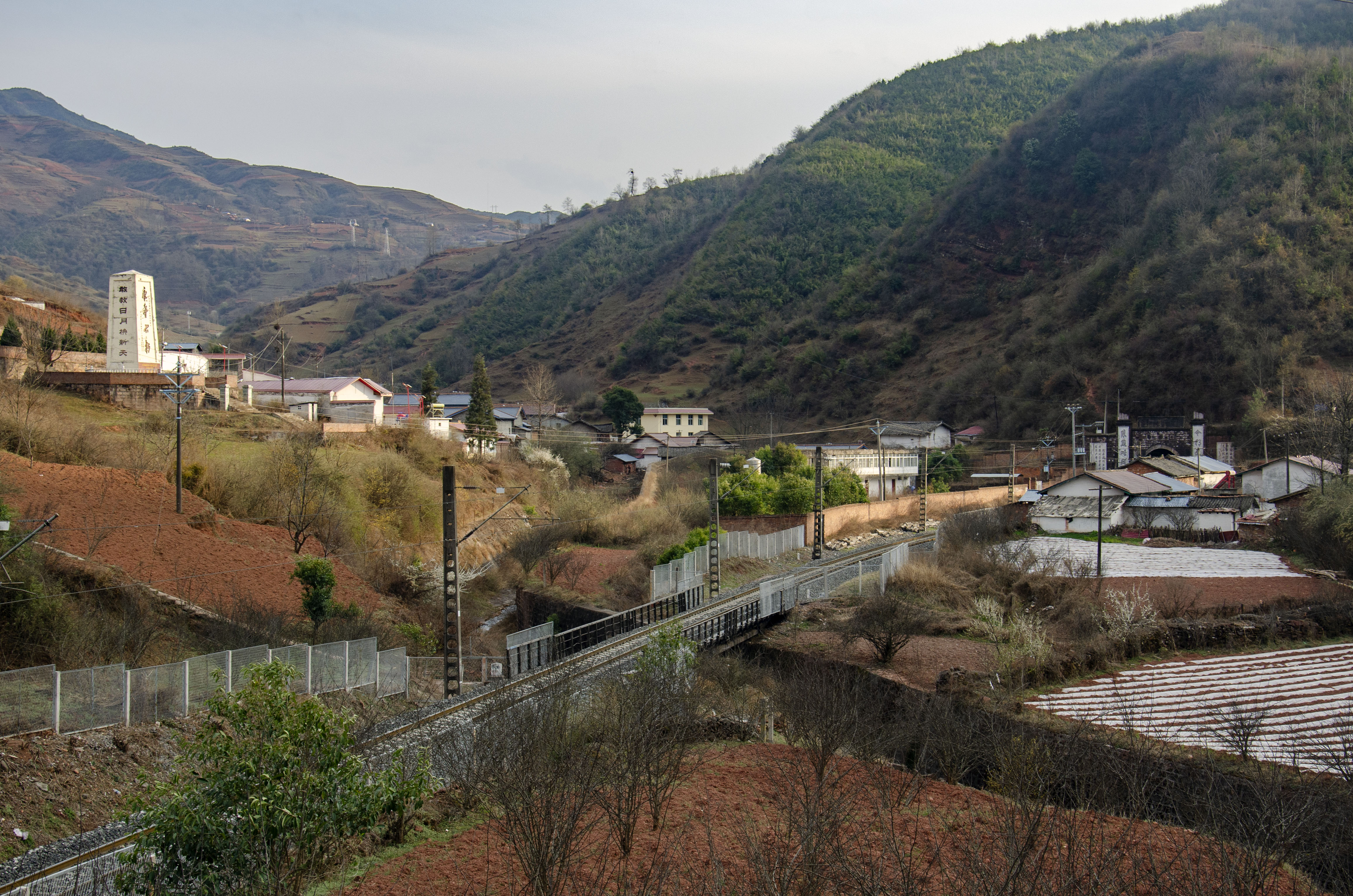
The highest point along the entire line is located near the Chengdu end of the Shamalada tunnel, between Hongfeng station and the Shamalada tunnel

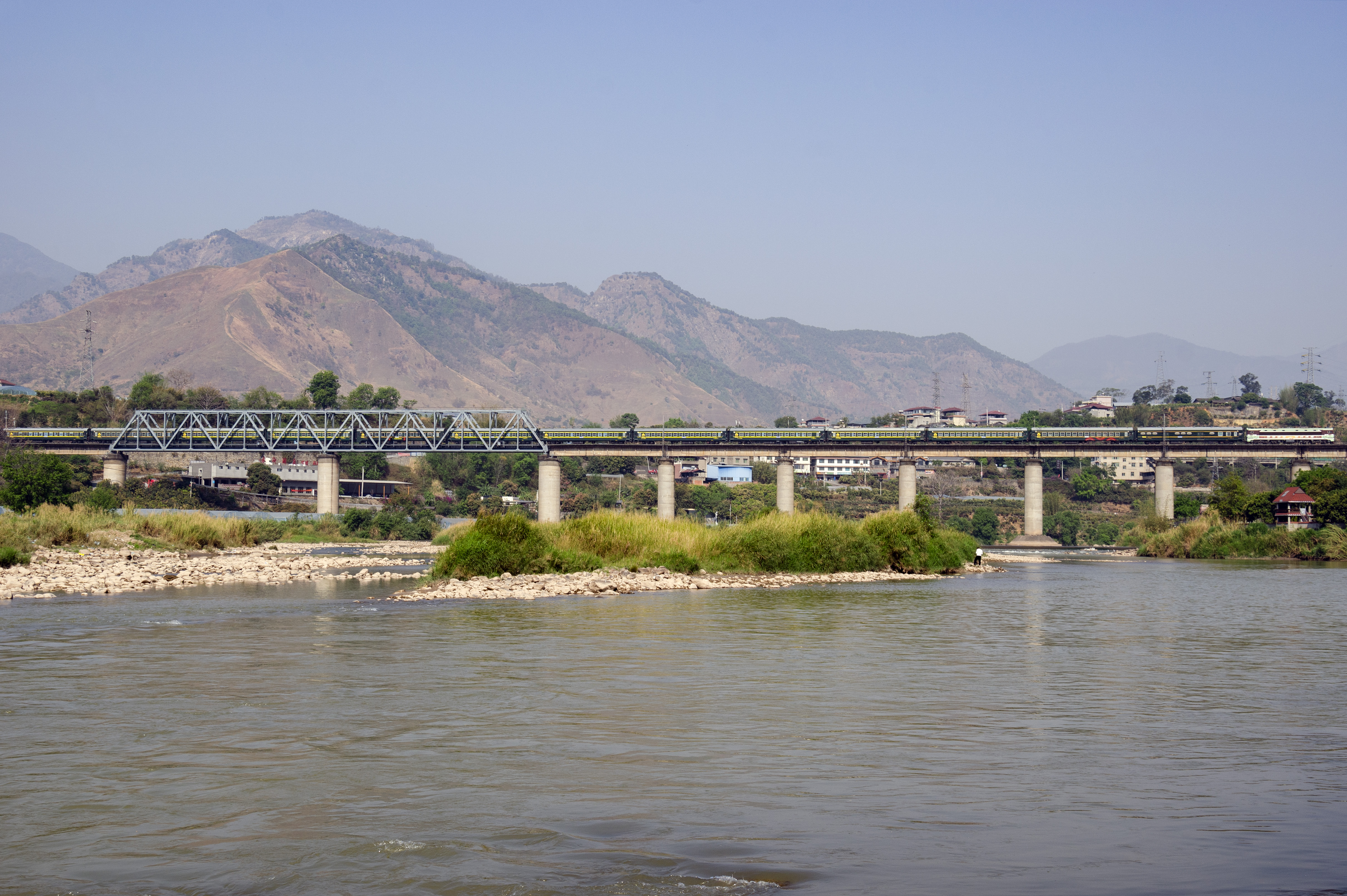
Anning river bridge no. 5, located in the Anning river valley

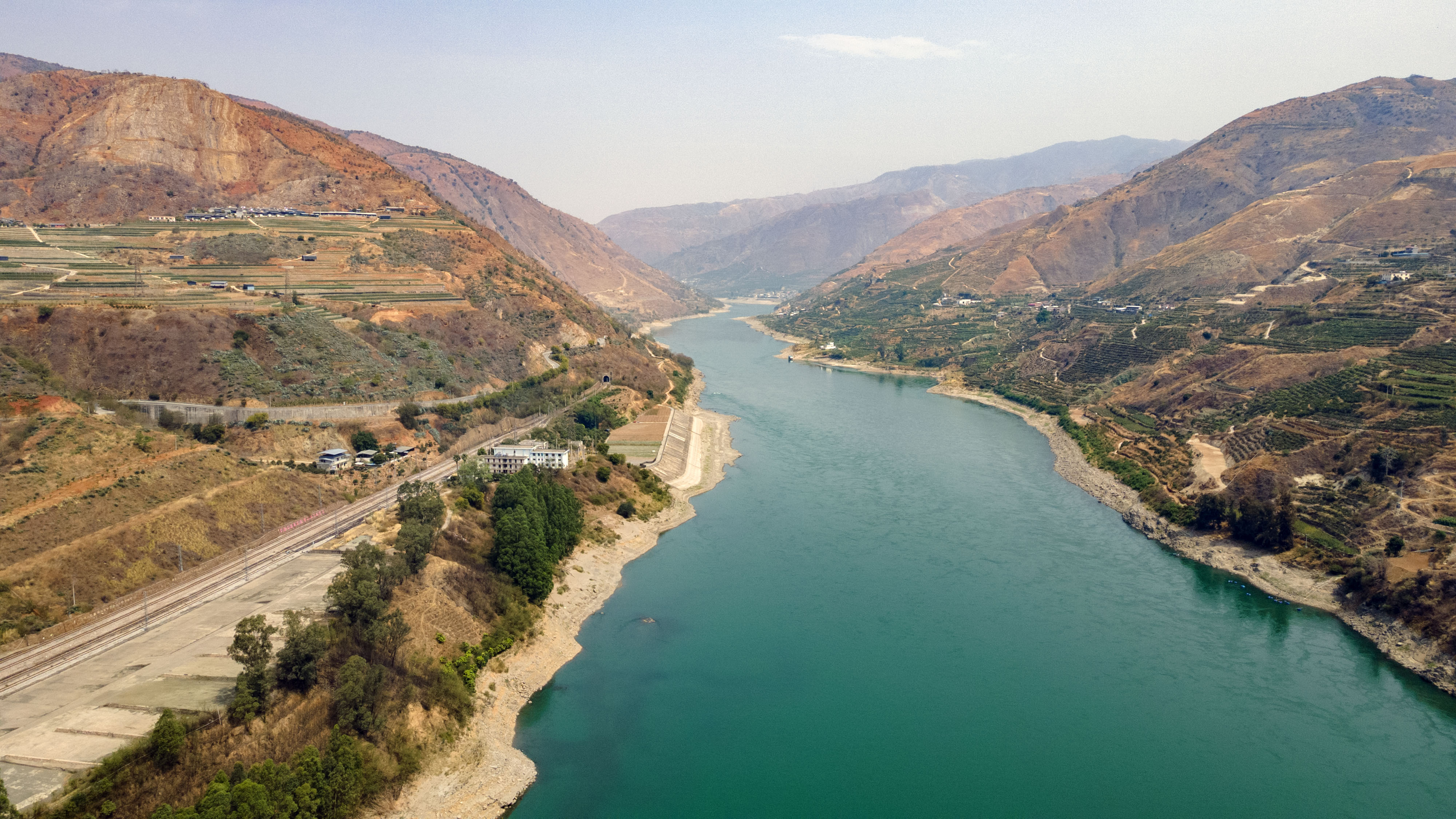
A section of the Jinsha river valley near Lazha station

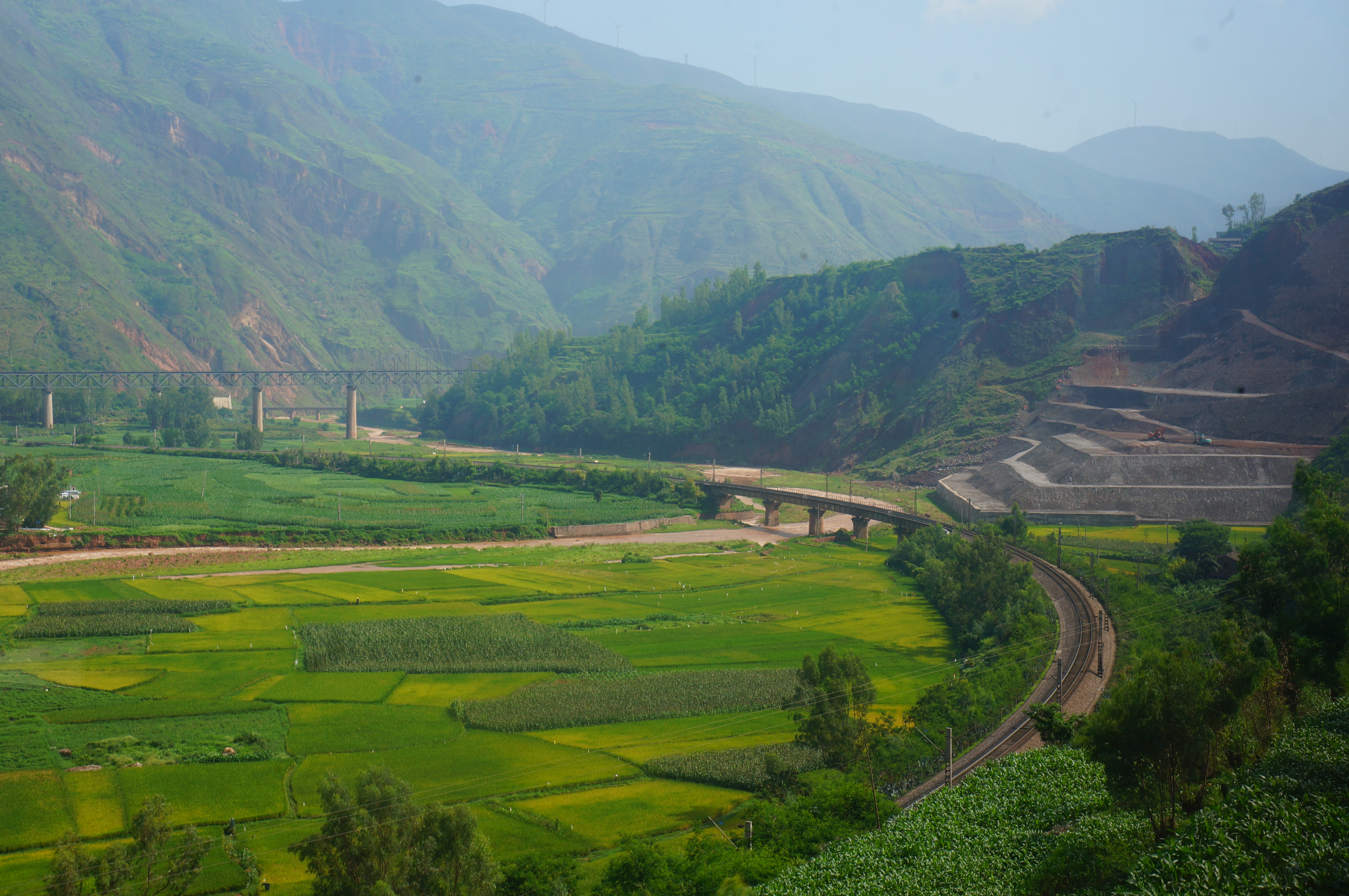
Fala spiral through the Longchuan river valley

== Construction process ==
=== Background ===
As early as the end of the 19th century, the United States, Britain, France and other countries planned to build a railway connecting Sichuan and Yunnan provinces, and some countries also conducted surveys. During the Second Sino-Japanese War in the 1930s and 1940s, the Nationalist government wanted to ensure transportation in the southwest region and also conducted some surveys on the line. After comparison, the Ministry of Communications selected the route through Yibin (then called Xuzhou), Fuzhen, Yiliang, Weining, Xuanwei, Qujing and Kunming, and established the Xukun (Xuzhou–Kunming) Railway Engineering Bureau to conduct preliminary surveys and preliminary construction of the line. However, the terrain of the section through which the line passed was steep and the geology was complex, and the project was ultimately not implemented. By June 1944, the Xukun Railway had only completed track laying between Kunming and Zhanyi.

After the founding of the People's Republic of China, the newly established Central People's Government needed to build domestic infrastructure. In 1952, while carrying out the Baoji–Chengdu railway project, the Ministry of Railways also began to study the route of the Chengdu–Kunming railway. In April of that year, the Southwest Design Bureau of the Ministry of Railways began to conduct preliminary surveys (draft surveys) of the line. The survey covered the area between Chengdu and Kunming, with a length of about 1,000 km (620 mi) and an average width of about 200 km (120 mi).

=== The proposal of three major plans for the entire route ===
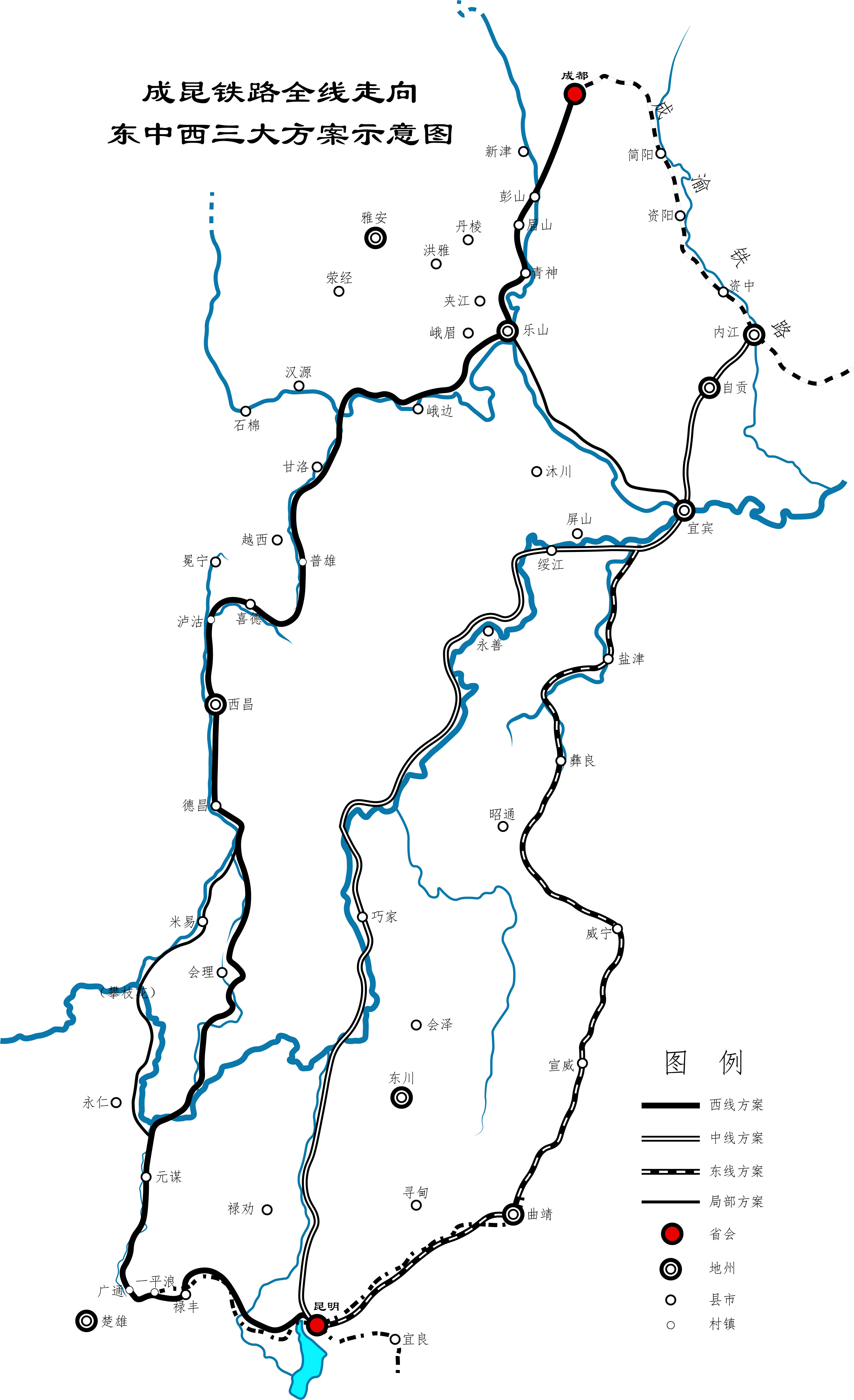
Schematic diagram of the three routes of the Chengdu-Kunming Railway: east, central, and west.

The preliminary survey was completed in April 1953. After the scheme study and preliminary survey, the Southwest Design Bureau proposed three route schemes for the entire line: an eastern route, a central route, and a western route. The routes of the three schemes were as follows:

The eastern route started from Chengdu, sharing the same line as the Chengdu–Neijiang section of the Chengdu–Chongqing railway. From Neijiang, it branched off the railway, heading south-southwest through Zigong, Yibin, and Anbian into Yunnan Province. Following the Guanhe River, it passes through Yanjin, Daguan, Yiliang, and Zhaotong, entering Guizhou Province at Weining County. It then re-enters Yunnan Province, passing through Xuanwei, Zhanyi, and Qujing before turning west, passing through Malong, Xundian, and Songming to reach Kunming. The eastern route was 1,112 km-long (691 mi).

The central route option started from Chengdu, sharing the same line as the Chengdu–Neijiang section of the Chengdu–Chongqing railway. From Neijiang, it branches off the Chengdu–Chongqing railway, heading south-southwest through Zigong and Yibin, then turning west through Pingshan, crossing the Jinsha River into Yunnan Province via Suijiang, Yongshan, Daguan, Qiaojia, Huize, Dongchuan and Songming, finally reaching Kunming from the north. The central route option was 1,033 km-long (642 mi).

The western route started from Chengdu, passing through Meishan, Leshan, Ebian, Ganluo, Xide, Xichang, Dechang, Huili and Guangtong, ending in Kunming. The western route was 1,167 km-long (725 mi).

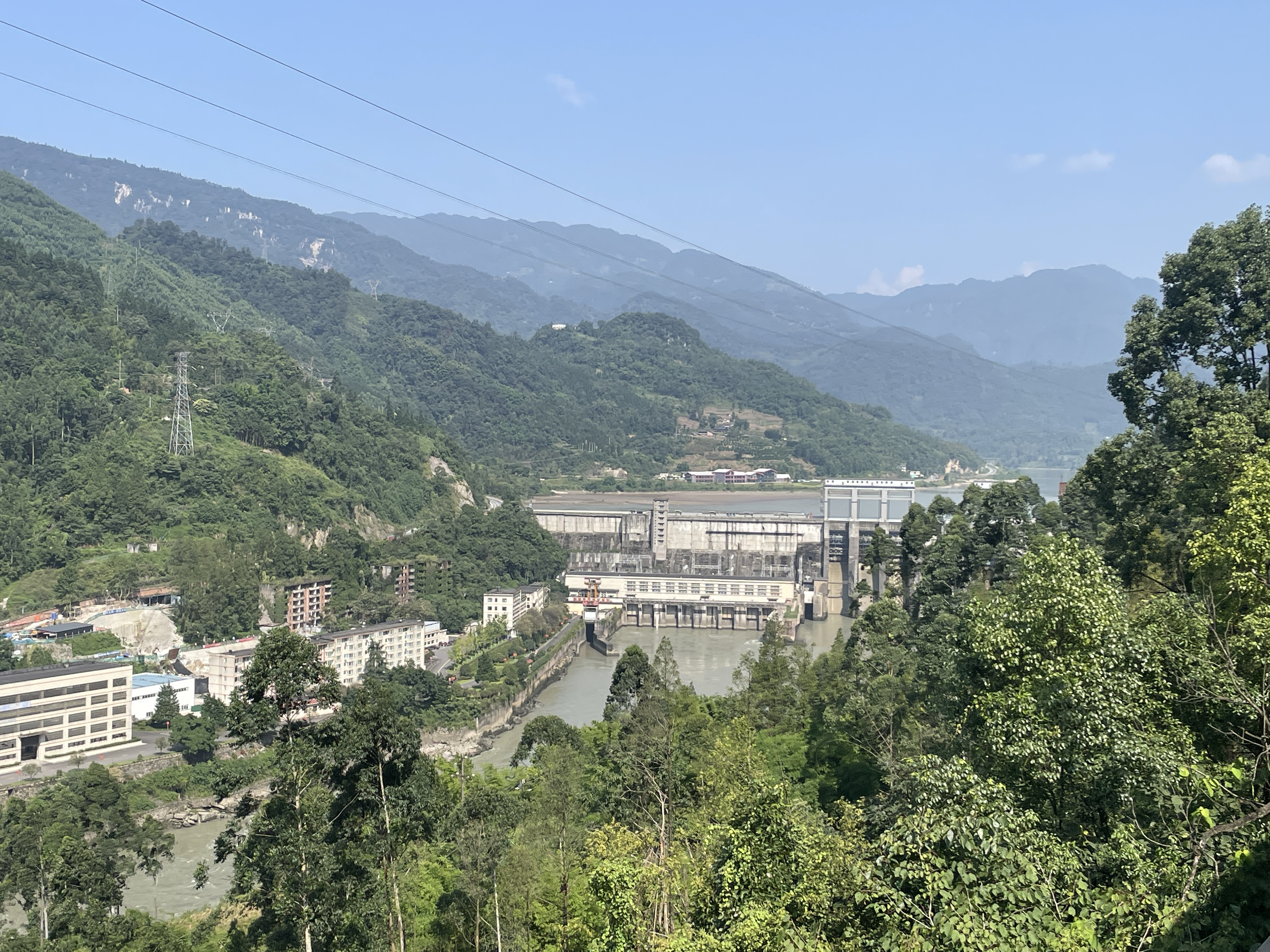
Gongzui Hydropower Station was built at the same time as the Chengdu-Kunming Railway.

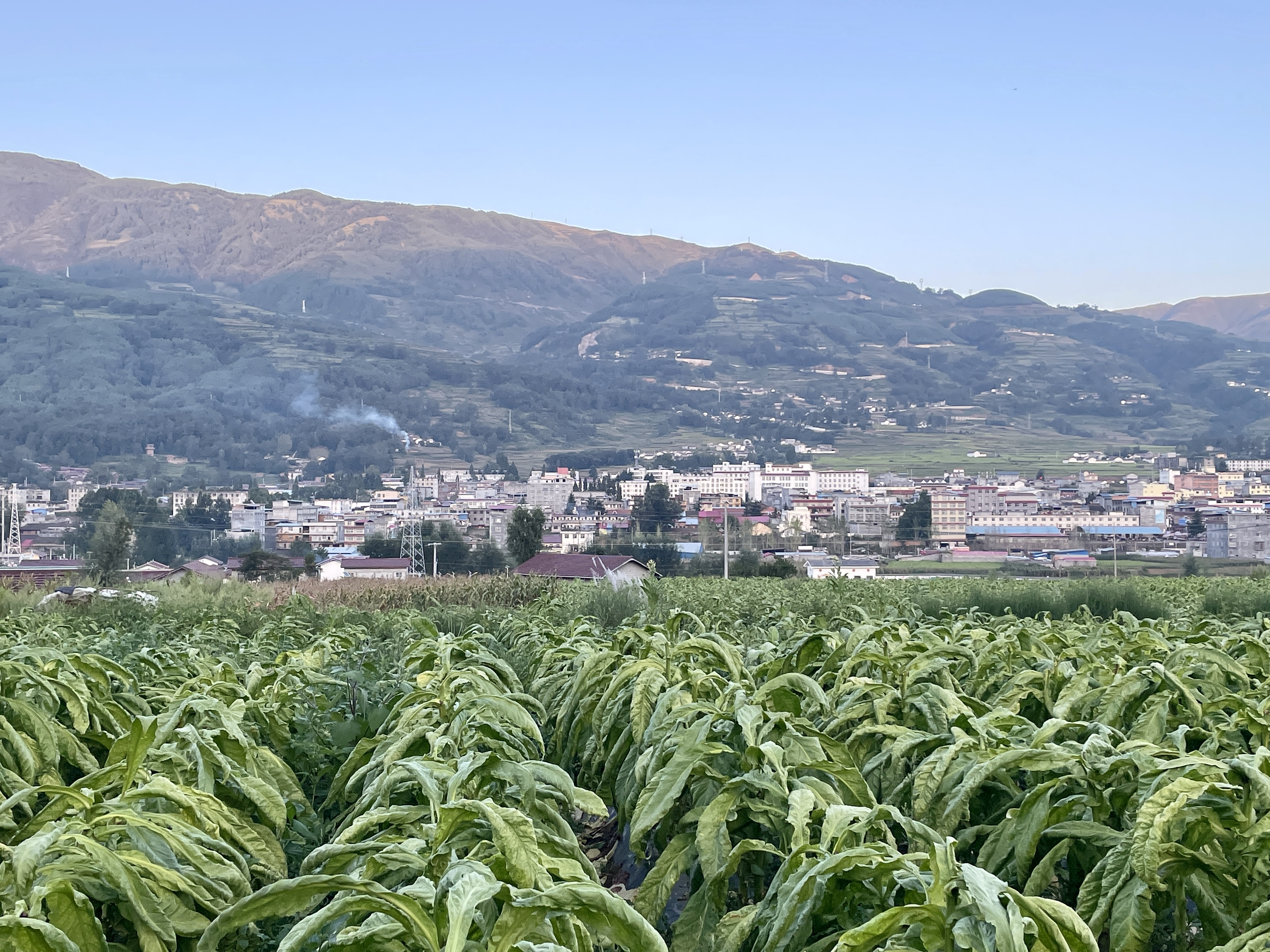
Puxiong Town , Yuexi County , deep in the Daliang Mountains , is where the Chengdu-Kunming Railway has a section station.

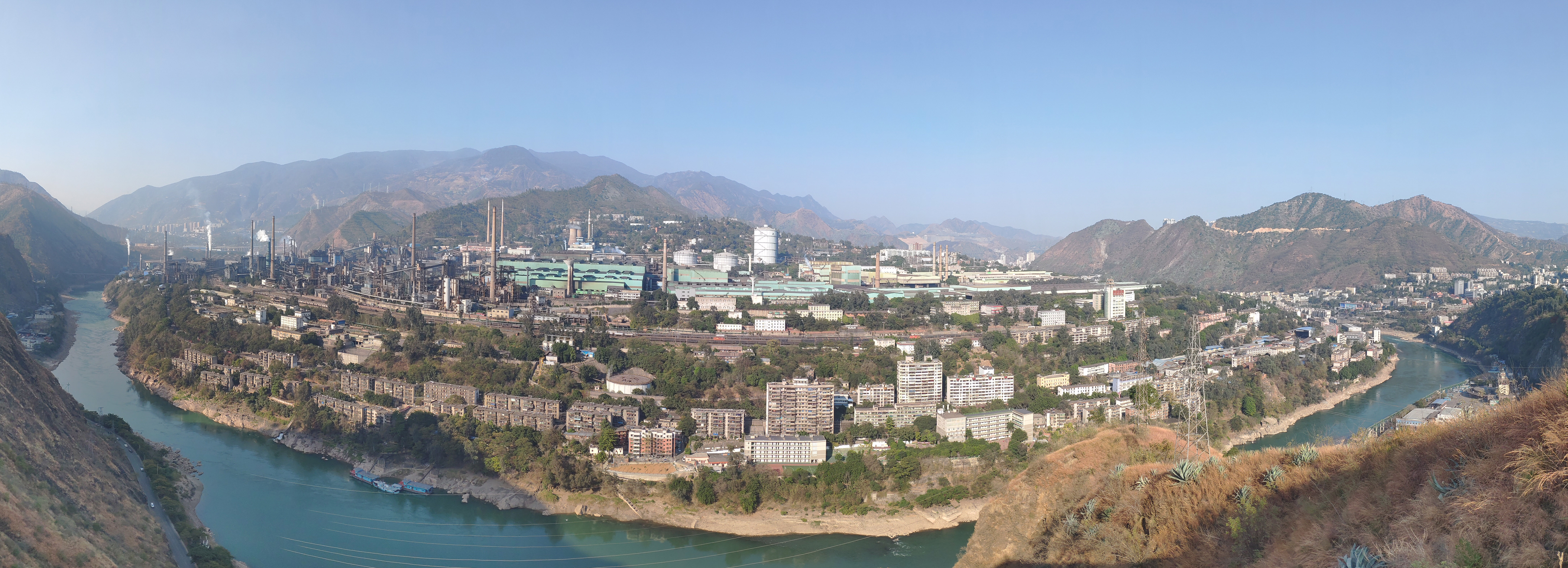
Panoramic view of Panzhihua Iron and Steel Group's main plant area (2021)

Advantages in economic resources, water conservancy projects, and ethnic settlements were the main factors that led to the final selection of the western route.

=== Solution selection ===
At the time, China was cooperating with the Soviet Union, and in principle, it learned everything from the Soviet Union. After completing the survey, the Southwest Design Bureau introduced three proposed routes for the Chengdu-Kunming Railway to Soviet experts assisting China, explaining each in turn. However, a debate ensued regarding the merits of each route. Initially, the central route was favored due to its shorter length, passing through the planned Shuicheng coal mine. However, Chinese engineers pointed out that while the central route was indeed the shortest and had a gentler slope along the Jinsha River, the geological conditions along the river were poor and the population sparse. The western route passed through minority areas and was beneficial for mineral development in the Xichang area, thus deserving consideration. Soviet experts, however, argued that the western route's geology was too complex and treacherous, and therefore insisted on the central route. They severely criticised the Chinese engineers for neglecting technical standards and operational conditions in selecting the route, instead focusing on political and economic implications that only leaders would consider. Some Chinese engineers were not convinced by the Soviet engineers' statement, because the Soviet engineers had never seen the high mountains of the western route and had no experience in building railways in mountainous areas. Therefore, they said that the western route could not be built because it passed through high mountains, which was hard to convince the public. Moreover, this concept of choosing a route that disregarded economic value for the sake of technical standards was not appropriate. However, because the Soviet experts were stubborn and had the concept of learning everything from the Soviet Union, these dissatisfying engineers did not express their opinions on the spot. In August 1953, the Southwest Design Bureau conducted a survey (preliminary survey) of the central route scheme recommended after discussion.

In September 1954, the Southwest Design Bureau completed the preliminary design of the central line scheme of the Chengdu–Kunming railway based on Soviet standards. When the Ministry of Railways appraised the project in 1955, due to the poor geological conditions along the Jinsha River and the increased construction budget compared to the previous one, the Ministry of Railways abandoned the central line scheme and focused only on the east and west schemes. In early 1956, considering the development of coal resources in Emei, Panzhihua, and Yongren and water resources along the Dadu River and Yalong River, the Ministry of Railways decided to adopt the western line scheme. From June 1956, the Second Design Institute of the Ministry of Railways (Note: That is, the Second Railway Survey and Design Institute, which at this time had changed its name from the Southwest Design Branch.) divided the western line scheme into two parts with Xichang as the boundary and conducted supplementary preliminary surveys, and completed the design opinion document of the western line scheme in 1957. In addition to initially determining the route, the design opinion also made preliminary decisions on technical standards such as limiting gradient, traction type, effective length of arrival and departure tracks, and locomotive routing.

After the plan was submitted to the State Council for evaluation, then Premier Zhou Enlai led a team to study it repeatedly. For a time, the Ministry of Railways and the central leadership could not make a choice. In the end, the central government believed that the western route plan had advantages in terms of mineral development, general economic development, and support for ethnic minorities along the route, and it also met the construction needs of the Panzhihua Iron and Steel centre. In the final review before National Day in 1957, the central government officially decided to abandon the central route plan and determined the western route plan as the route of the Chengdu-Kunming Railway.

The remaining eastern route was developed into the Neijiang–Kunming railway. The section from Chengdu to Neijiang belonged to the Chengdu–Chongqing railway, and the section from Zhanyi to Kunming belonged to the Guiyang–Kunming railway (now part of the Shanghai–Kunming railway). While the Chengdu–Kunming railway was being built, the Guiyang–Kunming railway was completed and opened to traffic. The Neijiang–Kunming railway was also completed first between Neijiang and Yibin. The remaining sections were temporarily shelved because there was no need for railway construction.

=== Survey and Design ===
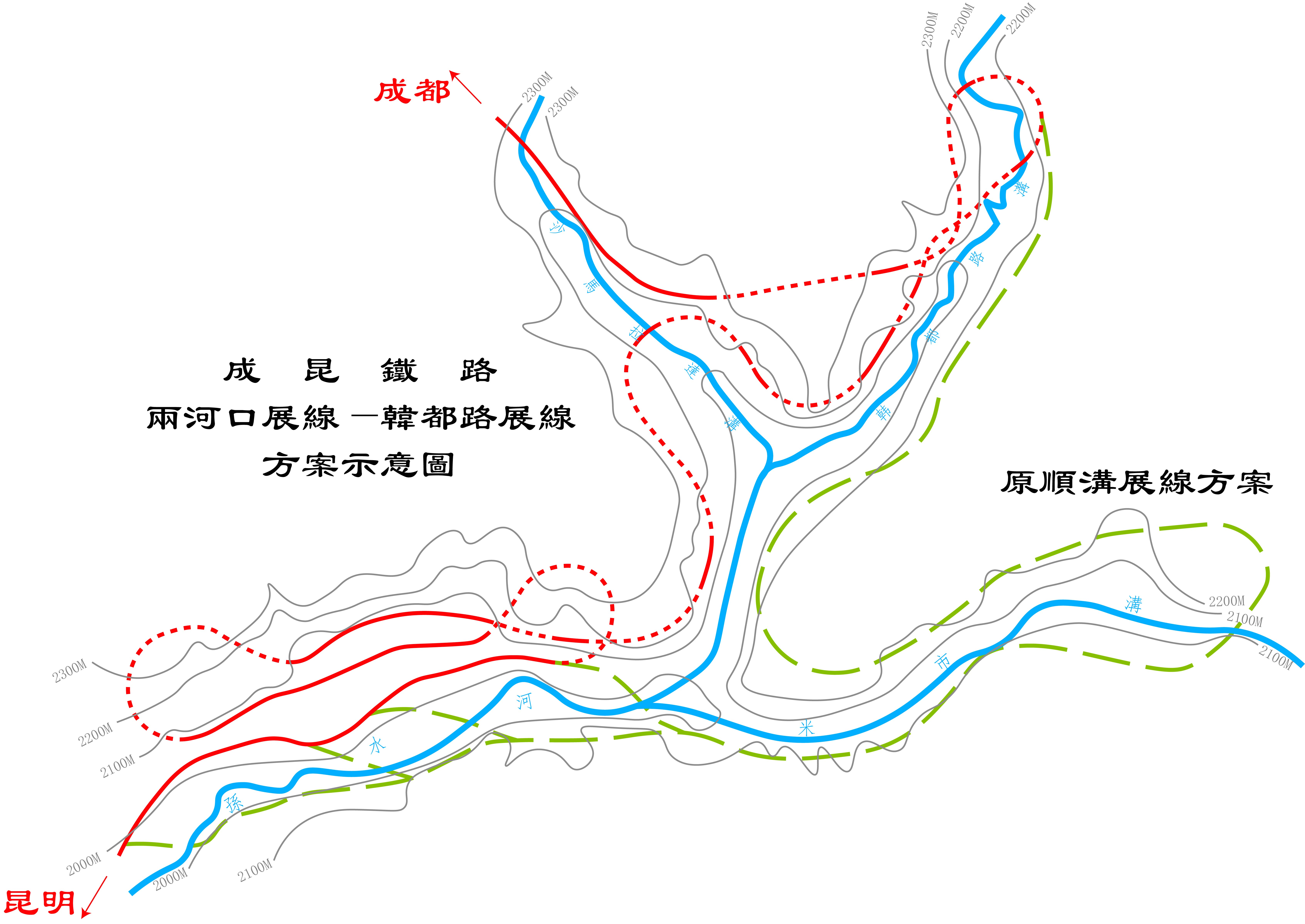
Example of design: survey and design of the Lianghekou and Handou Road alignment routes. The straight-line distance from Shamalada station adjacent to Wajimuliangzi at the top of the valley to Lianghekou at the bottom is 4 km (2.5 mi), with a difference of elevation of 215 m (705 ft). Initially, the route survey adopted a scheme following the Sunshui River and Handou Road valley, running along the valleys (green). However, after geological investigation, it was found that this scheme could not overcome potential geological hazards. Therefore, a new scheme was adopted, following the steeper but geologically stable right bank of the Sunshui River and Handu Road Gully (red).。

The survey and design work can be roughly divided into two stages, with 1964 as the dividing line.

The first stage was from 1956 to 1964. In this stage, in addition to compiling the design opinion in 1956, the Second Railway Survey and Design Institute also compiled the preliminary design in 1958 and the double-track construction design in 1960. Compared with the design opinion, the latter two made some adjustments to the technical standards such as the limiting gradient and traction type, and determined the minimum curve radius and block type. Construction design and key project construction were carried out in some sections first. The Second Railway Survey and Design Institute used the construction experience of these projects to determine some construction schemes for tunnels that require a long construction period, laying the foundation for the second stage.

The second phase was from 1964 to 1970. This phase was known as the "Southwest Railway Construction Campaign". During this period, the Second Railway Survey and Design Institute compiled the 1964 construction design, which modified the previous plan and finally determined the main technical standards, major plans and construction design. At the same time, construction was fully launched until the entire line was completed.

From the initial survey in 1956 to the opening of the line in July 1970, the total length of the line surveyed reached more than 11,000 km (6,800 mi), the geological survey covered 14,824 km^{2} (5,724 sq mi), more than 300 different plans were compared and screened, and a total of 212,710 m (697,870 ft) of geological drilling was conducted. Since the construction of the northern section of the line began in July 1958, the survey and design work relied on the cooperation of finalised survey and construction to gradually determine the engineering plan section by section, thus selecting the specific route of the entire line.

=== Preliminary construction ===
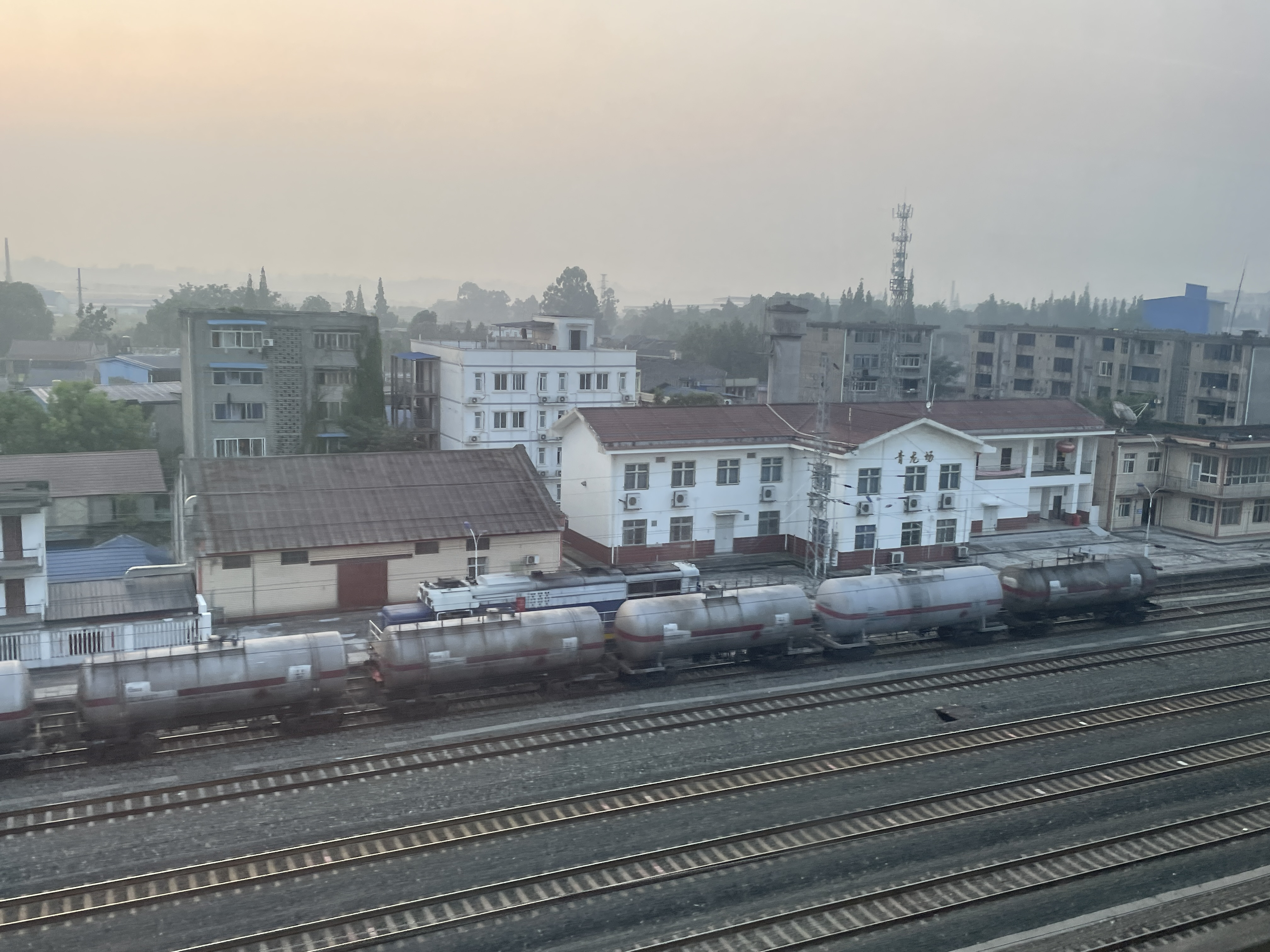
Looking over Qinglong station

The northern section of the line started construction in July 1958. The Chengdu–Emei section was fully constructed, and the Emei–Shamalada (Note: A place name in the Yi language, initially translated into Chinese as "Shamulada".) section was prepared for construction. Some key tunnel projects were started first. After April 1959, the Chengdu–Shawan section was basically completed. The remaining projects were all suspended except for the key tunnels south of Shawan station. Work on the northern section resumed briefly in 1960, but only the Chengdu–Qinglongchang section was completed before it was suspended again. In May 1961, construction of the line started for the third time, but by 1962, all work was suspended except for remediation of the existing Chengdu–Emei section's line defects and water damage. On the southern section, construction the Bijiguan Tunnel only started in February 1960, but it was suspended again soon after. In five years, the Chengdu-Kunming Railway cost ¥140 million, but only the 61.5 km (38.2 mi) section between Chengdu and Qinglongchang was opened to traffic. Afterwards, the People's Daily attributed the project's interruption to "Liu Shaoqi's revisionist line".

=== Third Front ===
In May 1964, the central government officially launched the Third Front. When the central leaders discussed the ideas for the Third Five-Year Plan that year, in addition to setting up the Panzhihua Iron and Steel works project, they called for the resumption of the supporting project, the Chengdu–Kunming railway. At the Central Working Conference on 28 May, when Zhou Enlai criticised Li Fuchun's preliminary ideas for the Third Five-Year Plan for its inadequate consideration of transportation, he cited the fact that the Chengdu–Kunming railway was not mentioned in the ideas. Liu Shaoqi also mentioned at the meeting that the Chengdu-Kunming Railway was one of the key projects of the Third Front construction.

On 22 June, Zhou Enlai held a meeting with the joint working group of the State Planning Commission. At the meeting, Zhou Enlai asked the working group to complete the inspection of some key projects of the Chengdu–Kunming railway and the Leshan, Panzhihua and Xichang areas along the line by the end of August. When Cheng Zihua, deputy director of the State Planning Commission, returned to Beijing to report, he said that the three major projects of the Chengdu–Kunming railway, the Panzhihua Iron and Steel works and the Liupanshui Coal Base must be included in the national plan and constructed at the same time.

On 15 July of that year, Mao Zedong mentioned in his talk about the Chengdu–Kunming railway project that even if there were not enough materials and other projects were put on hold, the Chengdu-Kunming Railway should be built in a concentrated manner, and even if necessary, the rails of the Neijiang–Kunming railway could be dismantled and used on the Chengdu–Kunming railway. (Note: At that time, only the Neijiang–Yibin section of the Neijiang-Kunming railway was completed.) In August, Mao Zedong clearly instructed that "the Chengdu–Kunming line should be built quickly", and even said to Peng Dehuai, who was about to take up the post of the chief commander of the Third Front construction.:

I can't sleep if the railway isn't repaired. If we don't have money, I'll take my salary. If we don't have rails, we'll dismantle the coastal railway. If we don't have a road, I'll ride a donkey down to Xichang. We must get the Chengdu–Kunming railway built!

Subsequently, under Zhou Enlai's deployment, people from all walks of life across the country came to the Southwest region and launched the "Southwest Railway Construction Campaign".

=== Southwest Railway Construction Campaign ===
==== Early Development ====
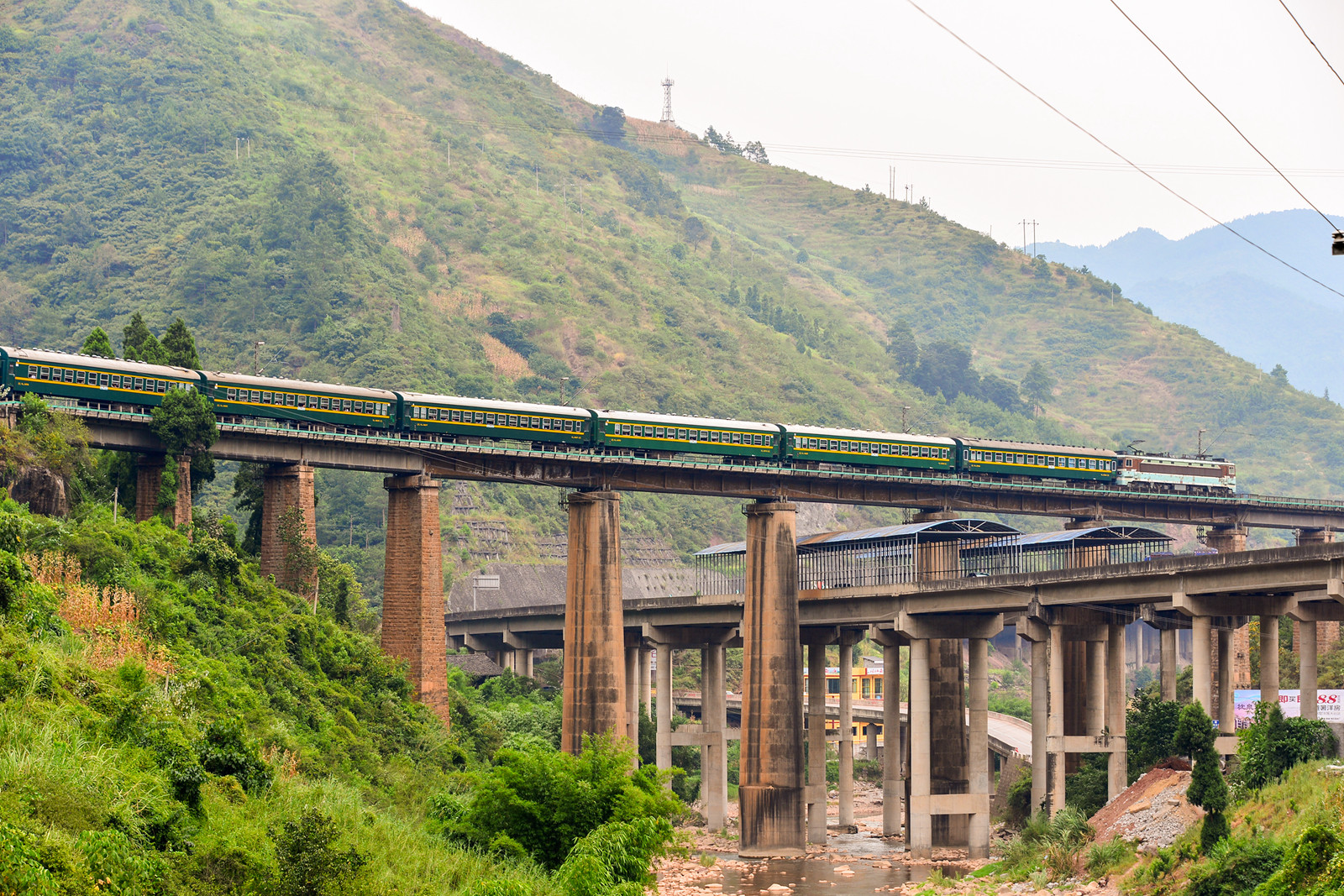
A view of the Sichuan-Guizhou Railway

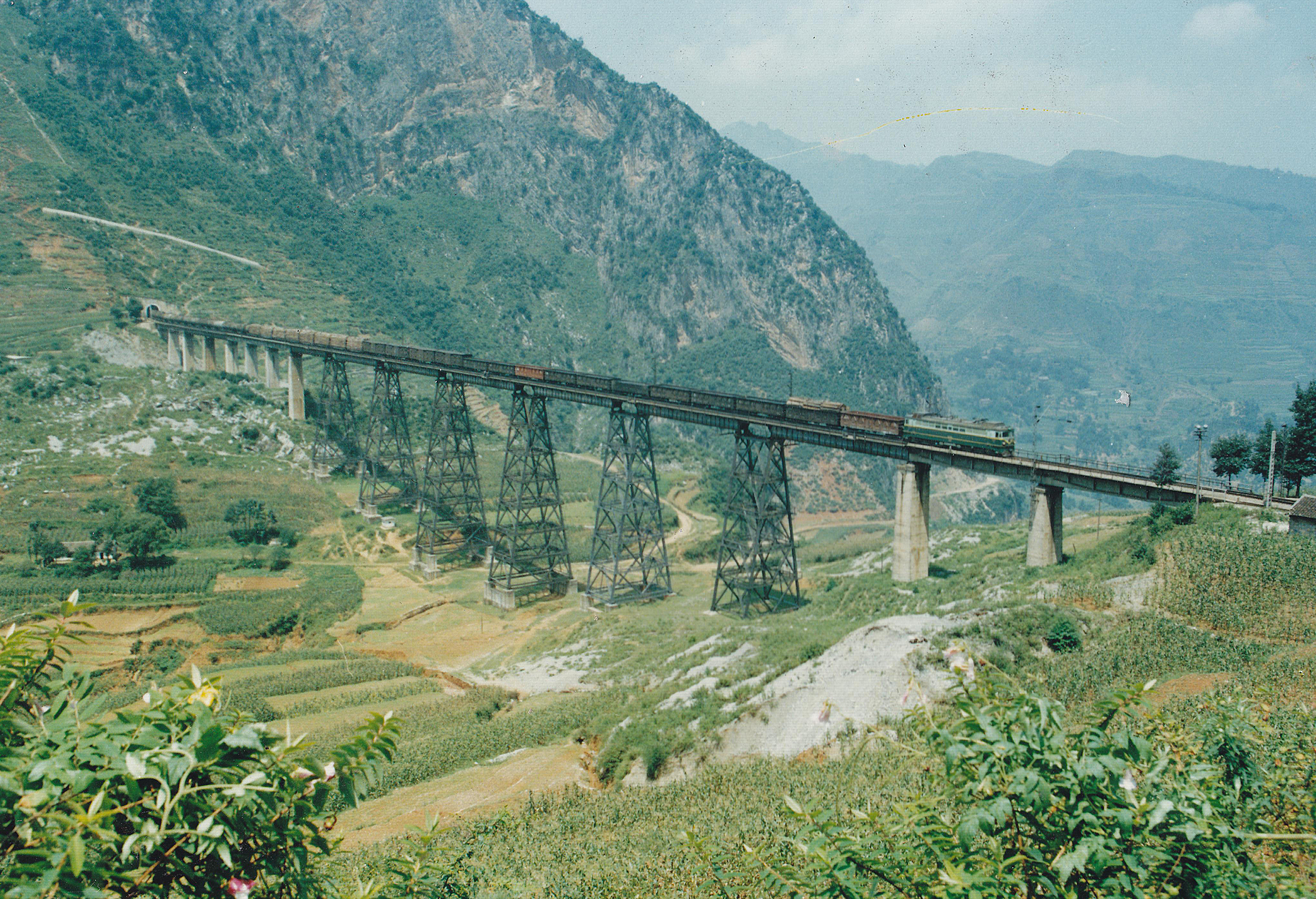
A view of the Guiyang-Kunming Railway

In addition to mentioning that "the Chengdu-Kunming Railway should be repaired quickly", Mao Zedong also mentioned that "the Sichuan-Guizhou and Guizhou-Kunming Railways should also be repaired quickly". This instruction determined the content of the Southwest Railway Construction Campaign. The purpose of repairing these two railways first was to leave time so that the further survey and design of the Chengdu-Kunming Railway could proceed smoothly, and to make sufficient preparations for construction. In addition, it could also train a group of experienced road construction teams.

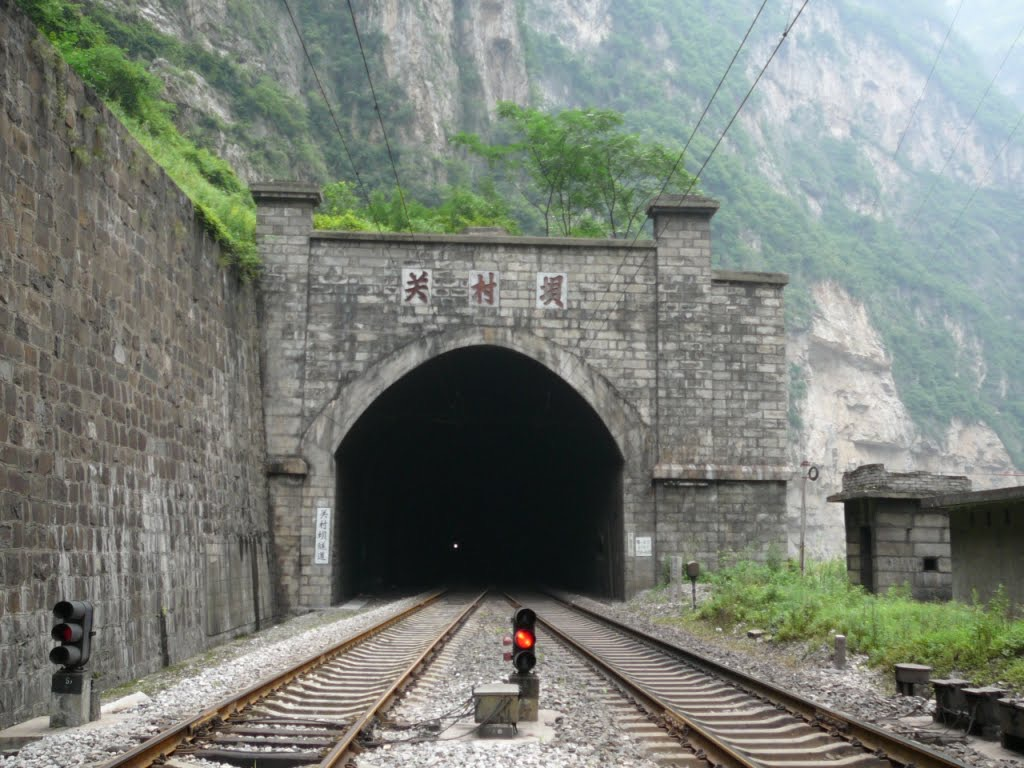
The Guancunba Tunnel, the second longest tunnel on the Chengdu-Kunming Railway, was constructed at a rate of 100 meters per month in 1965.

In September 1964, the Central Government established the Southwest Railway Construction Command for unified leadership, and the construction site command (hereinafter referred to as "the Command") under it organized and directed the project. At that time, the Chengdu–Kunming railway, together with the Chongqing Industrial Weapons Base and the Panzhihua Iron and Steel Works, formed the three major projects in the early stage of the "Third Front Construction" in Sichuan—"two bases and one line". At the end of October of the same year, the Command formulated a project plan centered on the Chengdu–Kunming railway—"first take Sichuan and Guizhou, then Guizhou and Kunming, and then the Chengdu–Kunming railway", that is, each department first invested in the projects of the Sichuan–Guizhou and Guizhou–Kunming railways, the Chengdu–Kunming railway first started key projects, and finally concentrated on completing the projects of the Chengdu–Kunming railway. In the fourth quarter of that year, the Chengdu–Kunming railway construction officially began. The 1st, 8th and 10th Divisions of the Railway Corps took the lead in entering the construction site and invested in the construction of key projects such as the Guancunba Tunnel, Shamalada Tunnel, Zhaoping No. 1 Tunnel and Bijiguan Tunnel.

Initially, the project command planned to construct the railway in parallel from north to south, (Note: Construction will proceed from Chengdu in the north to Kunming in the south, with each side facing the other.) with the southern section being the primary focus. (Note: prioritizing the construction of the northern section.) This decision aimed to complete the northern section's connection with the Panzhihua industrial complex first. By February 1965, considering the geology of the southern section, the construction progress of the Guiyang-Kunming Railway, and the geographical location of the strategic outpost, the project command adjusted the division of labor plan and decided to proceed with the northern and southern sections simultaneously, striving for either one to reach Jinjiang (now Panzhihua station) first, or for them to meet at Jinjiang simultaneously. At the second Party Committee meeting of the project command in May, considering the construction progress of the Sichuan–Guizhou and Guiyang–Kunming railways and the Guancunba Tunnel, a key project of the Chengdu–Kunming railway, the project command believed that while maintaining the parallel progress, the northern section should be prioritized for completion. The plan was clarified that the entire line would be connected at Jinjiang on 1 October 1968, and the entire line would be open to traffic in the first half of the following year. (Note: However, out of caution, it was not set as a deadline.) In November 1965, the Engineering Command, taking into account the fact that the Sichuan–Guizhou railway had been opened to traffic ahead of schedule, the main construction of the Guiyang–Kunming railway had been largely completed, and the Chengdu–Kunming railway could also be laid to Shawan by the end of the year, decided to arrange the following year's project according to the proposed plan to connect the railway in the third quarter of 1968: by the end of 1966, the southern section needed to be laid to Yipinglang and the northern section needed to be laid to Daduhe.

Between the end of 1965 and the beginning of 1966, the northern section completed the track laying task between Qinglongchang and Shawan. At the same time, after completing the engineering part of the Guiyang–Kunming, the 7th Division of the Railway Corps went to the construction site of the Pinglang to Kunming section of the Chengdu-Kunming Railway, and sent a group of people to the Jinjiang to Huangguayuan section for construction preparation.

In 1966, the Guiyang–Kunming railway project was almost completed. The units that were originally working on the Sichuan-Guizhou and Guiyang–Kunming lines came to the Chengdu–Kunming railway construction site one after another, and the Chengdu-Kunming Railway project made rapid progress. On 20 April, the southern section started laying tracks from Kunming West one year ahead of the initial plan; on 29 July, the northern section started laying tracks from Shawan six months ahead of the initial plan. The project command, in conjunction with the progress of the project, studied the situation repeatedly from May to August and finally decided to strive to connect the Chengdu–Kunming railway to the main line on 1 July 1968. In order to achieve this goal, the project command made adjustments to the existing division of labor, such as transferring the construction of the Dukou branch line to the Fifth Division of the Railway Corps and transferring the construction of several large bridges to the Bridge Engineering Bureau. At the end of that year, the project command also made specific arrangements for the construction plan in 1967.

By the end of 1966, the northern section of the track-laying area had been extended from Shawan to Ganluo, and the southern section of the track-laying area had been extended from Kunming West station to Guangtong station. The Chengdu to Shawan section was opened to traffic on 1 July of that year.

==== The impact phase of the power seizure movement ====
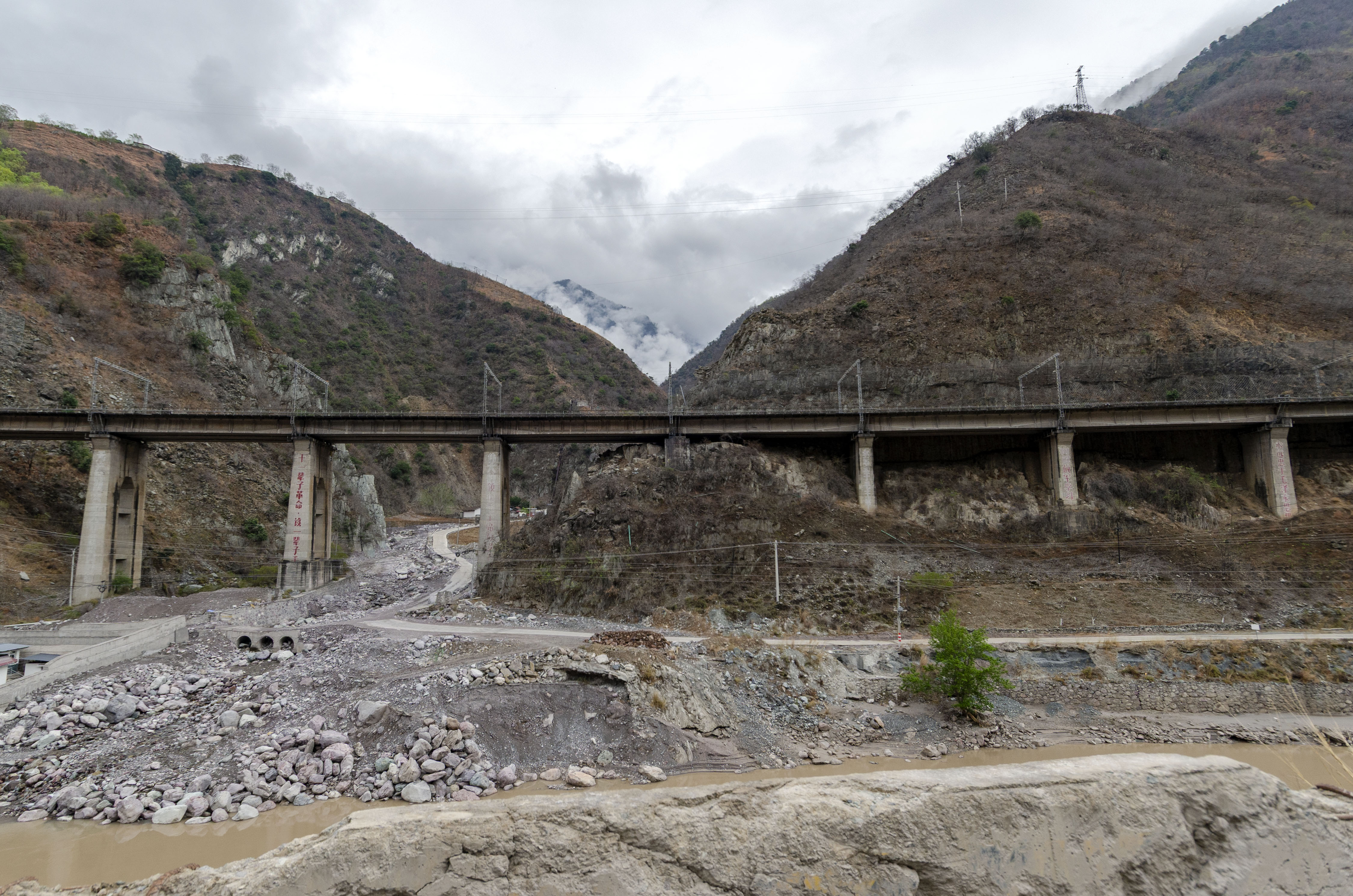
Part of the Suxiong Station yard is located on the Suxiong Third Line Bridge, which is under the responsibility of the Second Railway Bureau. Slogans such as "Long Live the Great Proletarian Cultural Revolution!", "Work in revolution for a lifetime, study Mao's Selected Works for a lifetime!", and "Long Live the Great Leader Chairman Mao!" can be seen on the bridge piers.

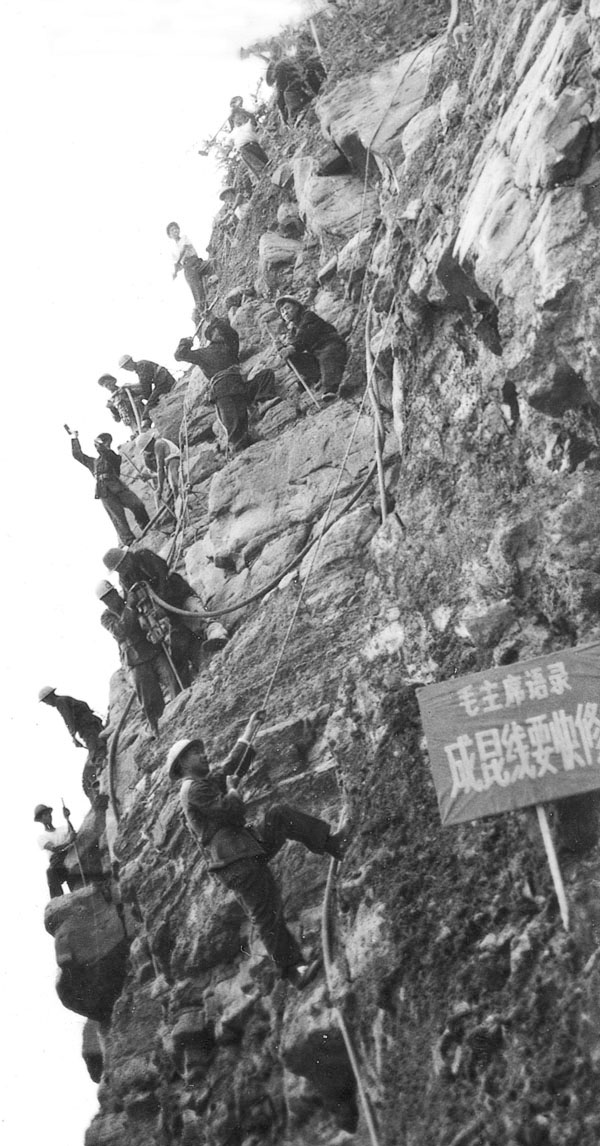
Workers from the Second Railway Bureau are constructing on the cliff face, where Mao Zedong's quote, "The Chengdu-Kunming Railway must be repaired quickly," is visible.

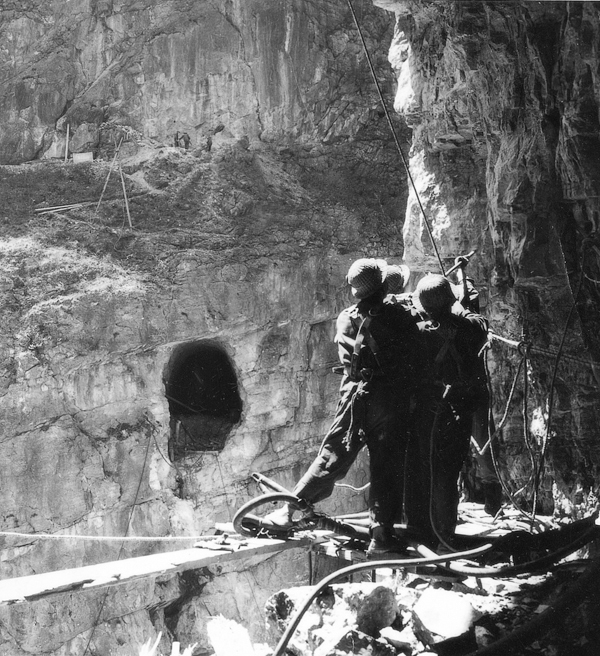
The workers of the Second Railway Bureau excavated the Laochanggou tunnel and built the adjoining Yixiantian bridge.

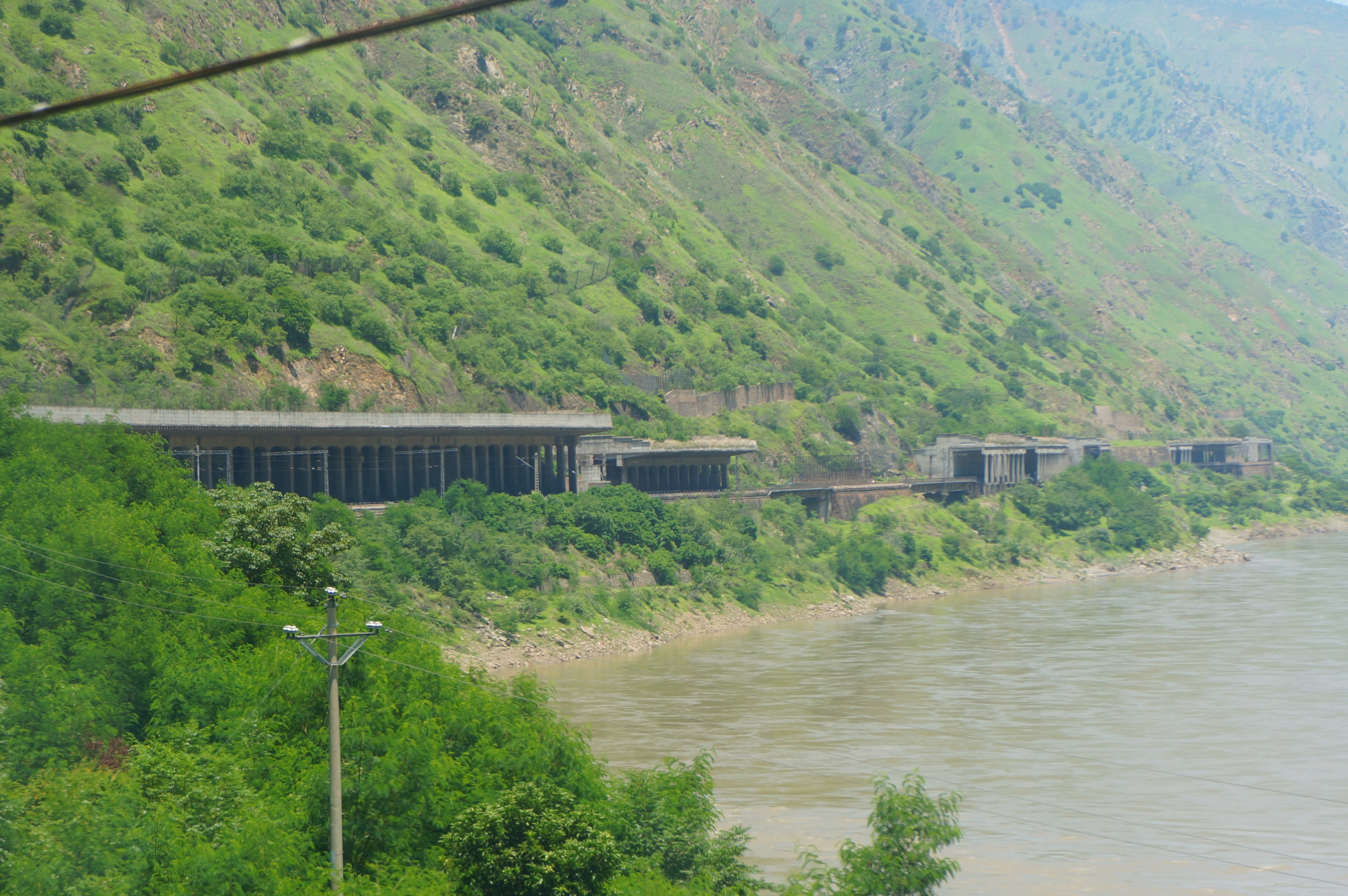
The tunnels near Xinjiang Station along the Jinsha River, which were abolished in 2020, including Jiangtou Village and Moyuzha, are located in this section. This section was constructed by the First Division and the Seventh Division. On the hillside above the Xinjiang tunnel on the left side of the picture, there are still nine large characters "Wishing Chairman Mao a Long Life" built by the Railway Corps

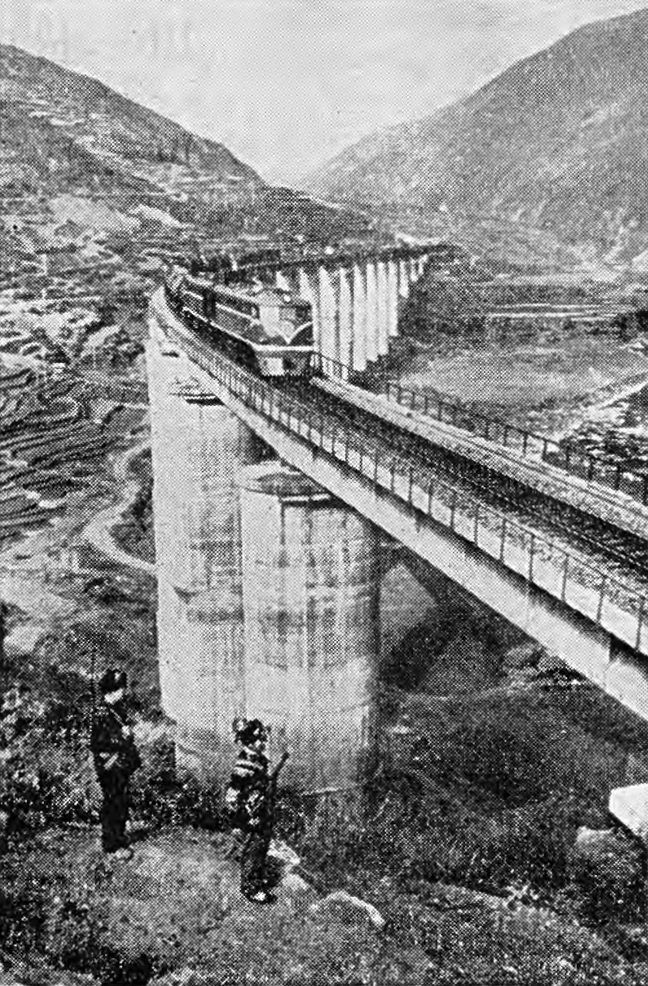
Yi militia guarded the Tiema Bridge, which was started in March 1967 and resumed twice before being completed in December 1969.

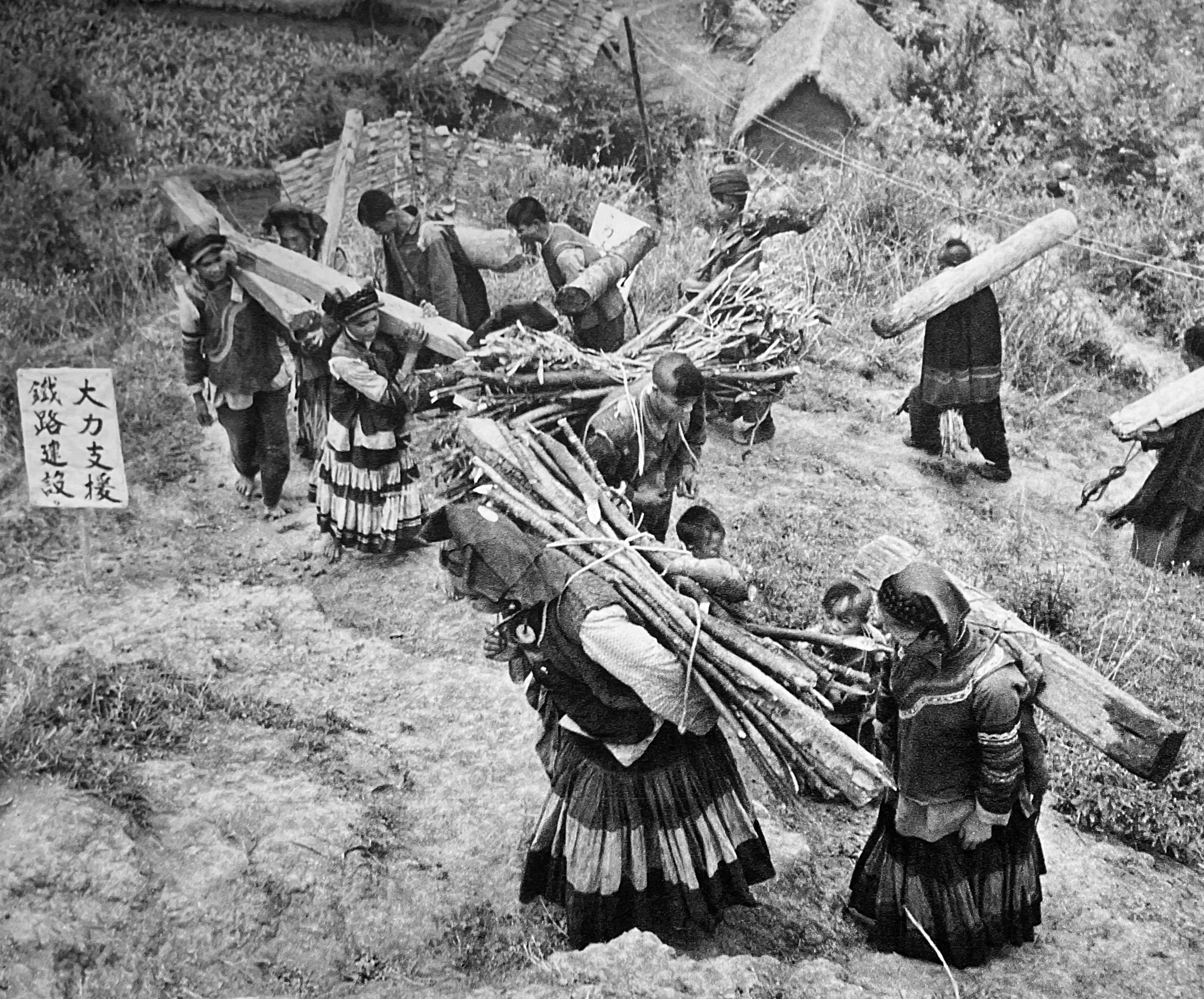
The Yi people of Liangshan supported the construction of the Chengdu-Kunming Railway. People along the line participated in the railway construction by joining the railway-building militia, establishing "Support-the-Railway Committees" to conduct publicity and outreach activities at the construction site, or organizing teams to transport supplies to the site.

The Chengdu-Kunming Railway, built amidst countless mountains and valleys.

After the start of the Cultural Revolution in 1966, some rallies criticizing Liu Shaoqi were held at the construction site. In early 1967, under the influence of the power seizure movement, the leadership of the Workers' Command was also taken away. In addition to the five divisions of the Railway Corps, all construction units were also affected. For example, the power seizure movement occurred in the various levels of the Second Engineering Bureau from the bureau down. The power seizure activities and the ensuing armed struggles occurred frequently, resulting in the outflow of railway workers and the inadequate supply of construction materials. Construction efficiency also declined, and some sections of the railway were almost or completely shut down.

On 1 May 1967, Zhou Enlai summoned Cui Tianmin, then political commissar of the Railway Corps, and asked the Railway Corps to "support the left" at the railway construction sites in the southwest region, that is, to take over the construction command and restore the construction order of the Chengdu–Kunming railway construction site. On 10 May, the State Council held a working meeting of the business group and officially issued the instruction for the Railway Corps to take over the construction command. On 25 May, led by Cui Tianmin, the Railway Corps established a takeover working group to go to the construction site to implement the takeover.

In July, the State Planning Commission and the Supervisory Commission issued the "Several Provisions on the Handover of Southwest Railway Construction Tasks" based on the content of the meeting on 10 May. On 18 August, the State Council and the Central Military Commission issued the "Decision on the Southwest Railway Construction Site Command to be Taken Over by the Railway Corps Command". This order clarified that all design and construction units of the former Ministry of Railways under the leadership of the Construction Command would be taken over by the Railway Corps, which was known as the "18 August" order. On 25 August, the Ministry of Railways and the Railway Corps issued the "Notice on Doing a Good Job in the Handover of Southwest Railway Construction Tasks", which reiterated the content of the "18 August" order. However, due to the fact that various units of the Ministry of Railways were stripped of power to varying degrees, the "18 August" order was not well implemented at the beginning. The Chengdu Military Region established a working group (i.e. the "18 August" working group) stationed at the Construction Command's residence in Xichang.

Although the relevant departments issued three notices in succession, the handover of tasks was not smooth due to the situation at the time. The takeover team was attacked by the rebels of the Workers' Command. After the arrival of the "18 August" team, its relationship with the rebel masses gradually deteriorated. By the end of 1967, the "August 18" team and the Railway Corps takeover team had all withdrawn from the Workers' Command's residence. Cui Tianmin was also criticised and struggled against after returning to Beijing. During this period, the Railway Corps achieved some success in projects such as the Jiangtou Village Tunnel, Yinsiyan Tunnel, and Moyuzha Tunnel due to the influence and encouragement of the takeover team. However, soon after, due to the impact of armed struggle, the supply of materials and electricity was insufficient, and it fell into a predicament where it could not carry out normal construction.

In December 1968, Zhou Enlai summoned personnel from the Railway Corps and the Second Railway Bureau to inquire about the opening time of the Chengdu–Kunming railway. The relevant leaders of the Second Railway Bureau and the Railway Corps explained the current progress of the project. That evening, Zhou Enlai assigned He Huiyan, the Chief of Staff of the Railway Corps, to be in charge of the construction of the Southwest Railway, namely, "to manage the Chengdu–Kunming line on one hand and the Xiangyang–Chongqing line on the other". (Note: At this time, the Xiangyang–Chongqing railway had already been started as part of the Southwest Railway.) In early 1969, the Railway Corps established a five-person leadership group headed by He Huiyan. In March of the same year, the Central Military Commission agreed to establish a special command organization in Chengdu for the Railway Corps—the Southwest Command of the Railway Corps, codenamed General Unit 520, with He Huiyan as the commander. On 12 May, the State Council announced the abolition of the Engineering Command, and the construction tasks of the Chengdu–Kunming and Xiangyang–Chongqing lines were all handed over to the Southwest Command of the Railway Corps. In the summer and autumn of that year, the Central Committee of the Chinese Communist Party also decided to send troops to support "the left" to be stationed in key units in Xichang, and the armed conflict in the Xichang area was completely stopped.

In October 1969, the Chengdu Military Region and the Railway Corps received instructions from the Central Committee and Mao Zedong, ordering the Fifth Division of the Railway Corps to send troops to take over the Second Engineering Bureau. On 22 October, the Fifth Division established the Military Management Committee of the Second Engineering Bureau—the Military Management Committee of the Second Railway Bureau. At the end of that year, Zhang Guohua, the political commissar of the Chengdu Military Region, wrote a report on solving several current problems in Sichuan (Central Issue [69] No. 88) and submitted it to the Central Committee. On 25 December, Mao Zedong read the report and wrote "do as required." The Central Committee then issued an instruction on the same day (Central Issue [69] No. 87), which is known as the "25 December Instruction". That evening, Zhou Enlai announced the "25 December Instruction" at the graduation meeting of the Sichuan class of the Mao Zedong Thought Study Class, which marked the beginning of solving a series of social problems in Sichuan.

On the evening of 29 December, Zhou Enlai held a meeting with leaders of the Railway Corps and other departments to discuss railway construction during the Fourth Five-Year Plan. At the meeting, Zhou Enlai invited He Huiyan and Gu Xiu, commander of the Fifth Division, to report on the progress of the Chengdu-Kunming Railway project. After listening to the report, Zhou Enlai pointed out that under the current domestic and international situation, many Third Front projects needed to rely on the Chengdu–Kunming railway for completion. At the same time, he requested:

Without the Chengdu–Kunming railway, everything else is just empty talk. The construction of the Chengdu-Kunming Railway was to be uniformly managed by the Railway Corps, under the command of He Huiyan. Previously, the management was not unified, but now it is. The requirement is that the railway be opened to traffic before 1 July 1970.

After hearing the requirement to "open the railway on 1 July", He Huiyan and Gu Xiu initially said that they were not confident in completing the task and invited Liu Xianquan, the commander of the Railway Corps, to attend the meeting. After Liu Xianquan arrived at the meeting and further discussion, Zhou Enlai issued a requirement that the Ministry of Railways and other relevant departments should guarantee the construction material needs for the remaining projects and emphasised that the Chengdu–Kunming railway should be put first. Finally, all parties agreed that "the Chengdu–Kunming railway be fully opened to traffic on 1 July 1970". At the Railway Corps Party Committee meeting held the next day, Liu Xianquan, He Huiyan and others conveyed the central government's requirements for the Chengdu–Kunming railway to "open to traffic on 1 July". After the meeting, the various units of the Railway Corps conveyed the requirements down to the divisions, thus starting the "decisive battle" for the construction of the Chengdu–Kunming railway.

From the beginning of 1967 to the end of 1969, the total amount of work completed in all sections of the line was only equivalent to the amount completed in 1966. Moreover, the quality of the work in some sections was poor, and the construction machinery and materials suffered varying degrees of damage and waste. During this period, the sections of the line that were the responsibility of the Railway Corps were also completed one after another. In 1969, the 7th Division, the 8th Division, and the 1st Division completed the sections of the Chengdu–Kunming railway in May, the fourth quarter, and the second half of the year, respectively, and then went to the Xiangyu Railway construction site.

==== Resumption of construction and reopening of operations ====
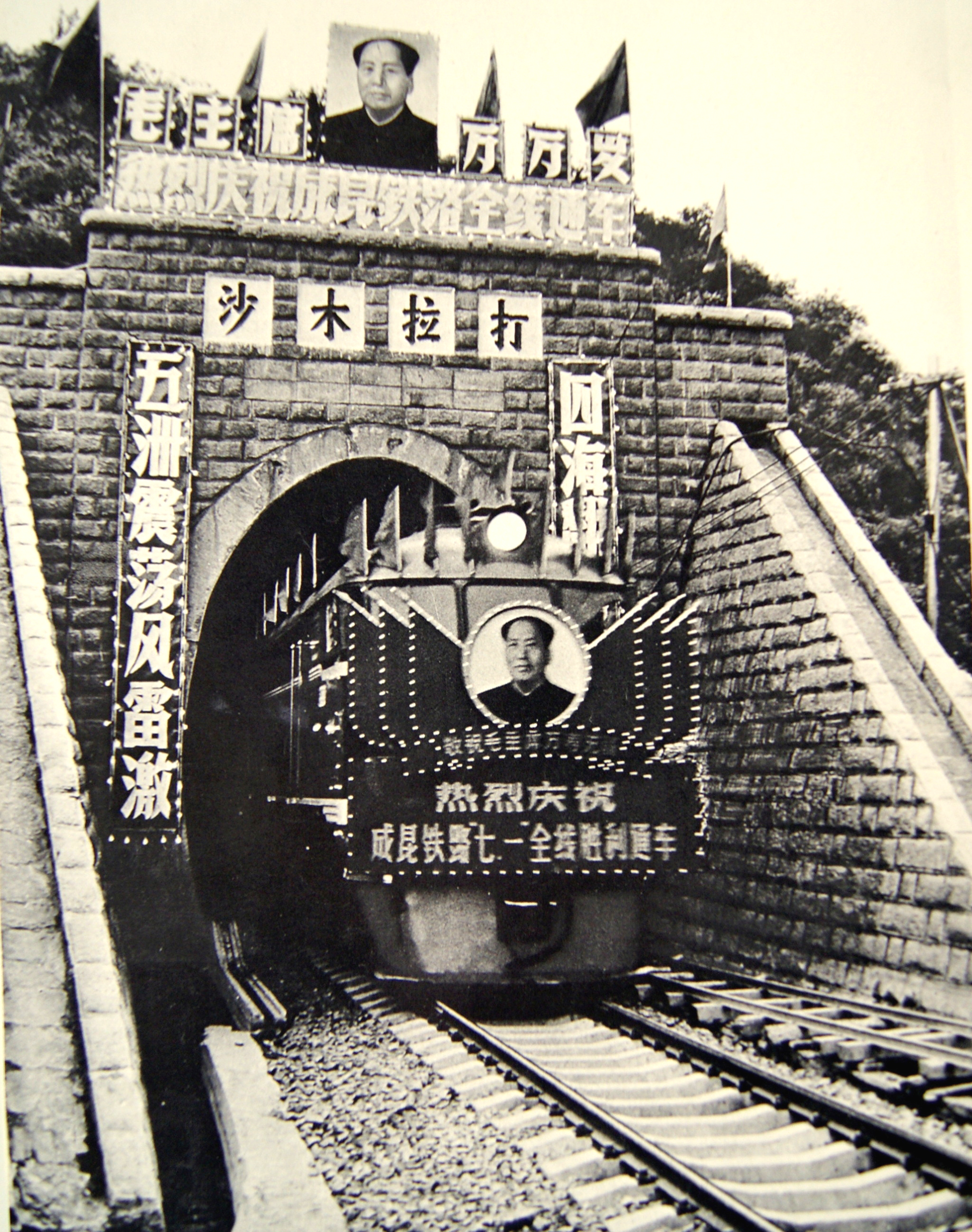
On the eve of the opening of the railway, a float passed through the Samarada Tunnel.

After the Central Committee issued the call for "the entire line to be opened to traffic on 1 July 1970", the dispersed rail construction forces gradually returned to the construction site. At that time, the problems of the entire line section were the most serious in the Ganluo–Lizhou section, which was under the responsibility of the Second Engineering Bureau: the remaining work was concentrated in this section, and some of the projects had some defects in the facilities due to the long suspension of work. Finally, the command transferred some sections originally under the responsibility of the Second Engineering Bureau to the Fifth Division and the Tenth Division for assistance in completion.

After half a year of emergency repairs, the north and south sections of the Chengdu–Kunming railway were finally connected at Lizhou station before 1 July 1970. On 1 July, the main ceremony was Xichang station in Xichang, with smaller ceremonies in Chengdu and Kunming. The opening ceremony of the Chengdu–Kunming railway was held by the Xichang Prefectural Committee of the CCP and the 10th Division of the Railway Corps. The main ceremony was presided over by the Xichang Prefectural Committee and delegations from the Central Government and Yunnan Province attended the meeting. Wu Faxian, head of the Central Delegation, read the congratulatory telegram from the CCP Central Committee. Afterwards, two floats that had started from Chengdu and Kunming respectively before the ceremony arrived at the venue one after another. The leaders attending the meeting cut the ribbon at the connection point. After the ribbon-cutting, the two floats continued to run towards Kunming and Chengdu. This marked the completion and opening of the entire Chengdu-Kunming Railway.

After the line was connected and opened to traffic, all units carried out half a year of finishing work on the entire line. Subsequently, the State Council's Chengdu–Kunming Railway Acceptance Working Group set up two acceptance working groups in Yunnan and Sichuan provinces, one for the north and one for the south. After the working group determined that the line met the acceptance standards, it was decided that the entire Chengdu–Kunming railway would be officially put into operation from 1 January 1971. With Jinjiang station (now Panzhihua station) as the boundary, the northern section including Jinjiang station was handed over to the Chengdu Railway Bureau for operation, and the southern section was handed over to the Kunming Railway Bureau for operation.

=== Construction workforce distribution ===
Summary of the division of labour in the construction of the Chengdu–Kunming railway
Construction area		Construction unit	Distance (km)
from	to	Construction unit	Distance (km)
Chengdu	Wuchang	China Railway No.2 Group	115.00
Wuchang	Jinkouhe	10th Railway Corps	134.23
Jinkouhe	Lizhou	China Railway No.2 Group	282.58
Lizhou	Miyi	10th Railway Corps	150.30
Miyi	Jinsha River Bridge left bank	5th Railway Corps	56.74
Jinsha River Bridge (Note: Several other large-scale bridge projects in other sections were also completed by the Bridge Bureau)		China Railway Bridge Bureau	0.53
Jinsha River Bridge right bank	Yizi	Third Division of the 4th Railway Corps	19.04
Yizi	Xinjiang	7th Railway Corps	34.79
Xinjiang	Huanggua Yuan	1st Railway Corps	42.96
Huanggua Yuan	Yiping Lang	8th Railway Corps	126.26
Yiping Lang	Kunming West	7th Railway Corps	121.90

=== Electrification upgrade ===
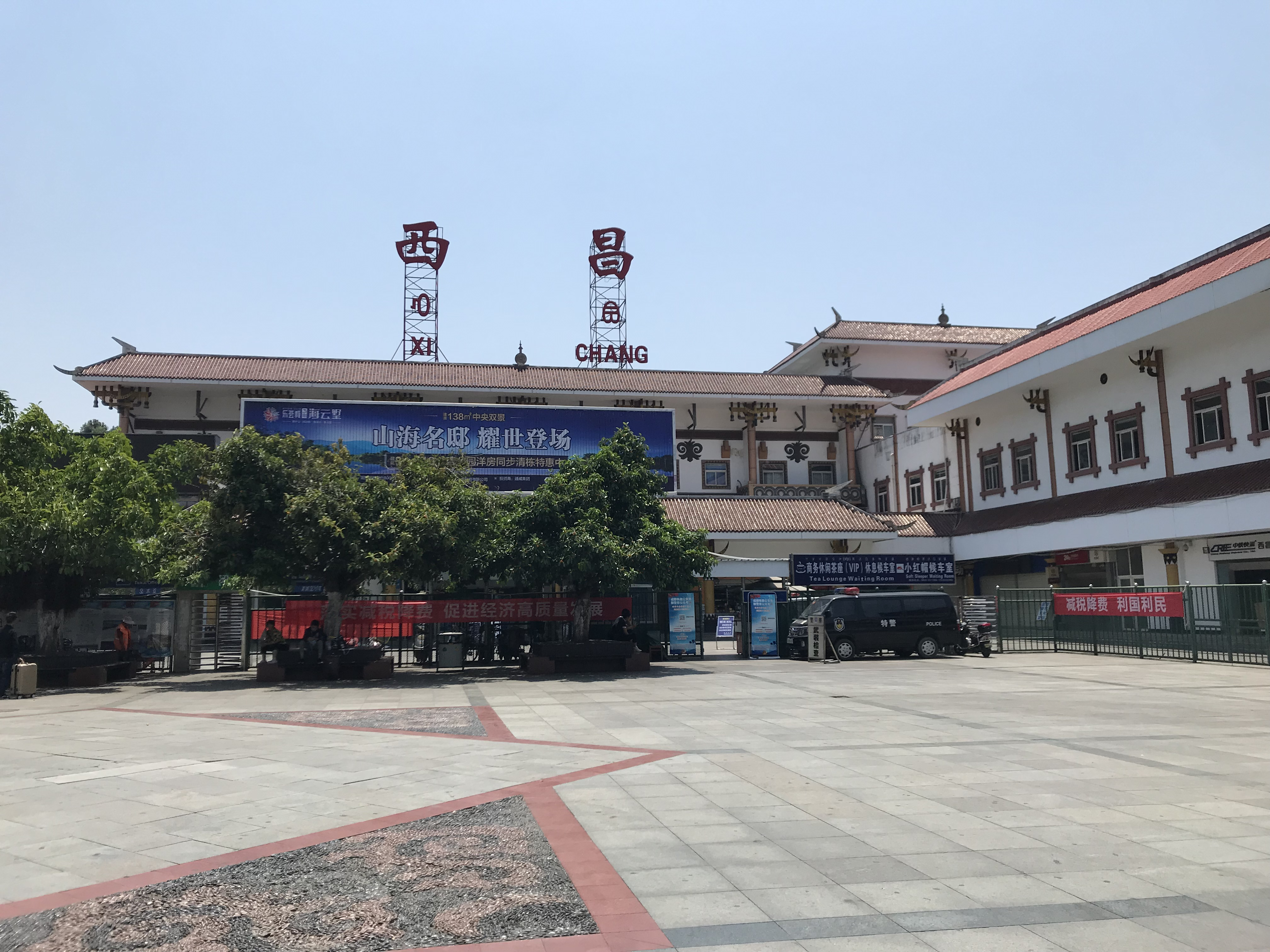
Xichang Station building rebuilt during the electrification of the Chengdu-Kunming Railway

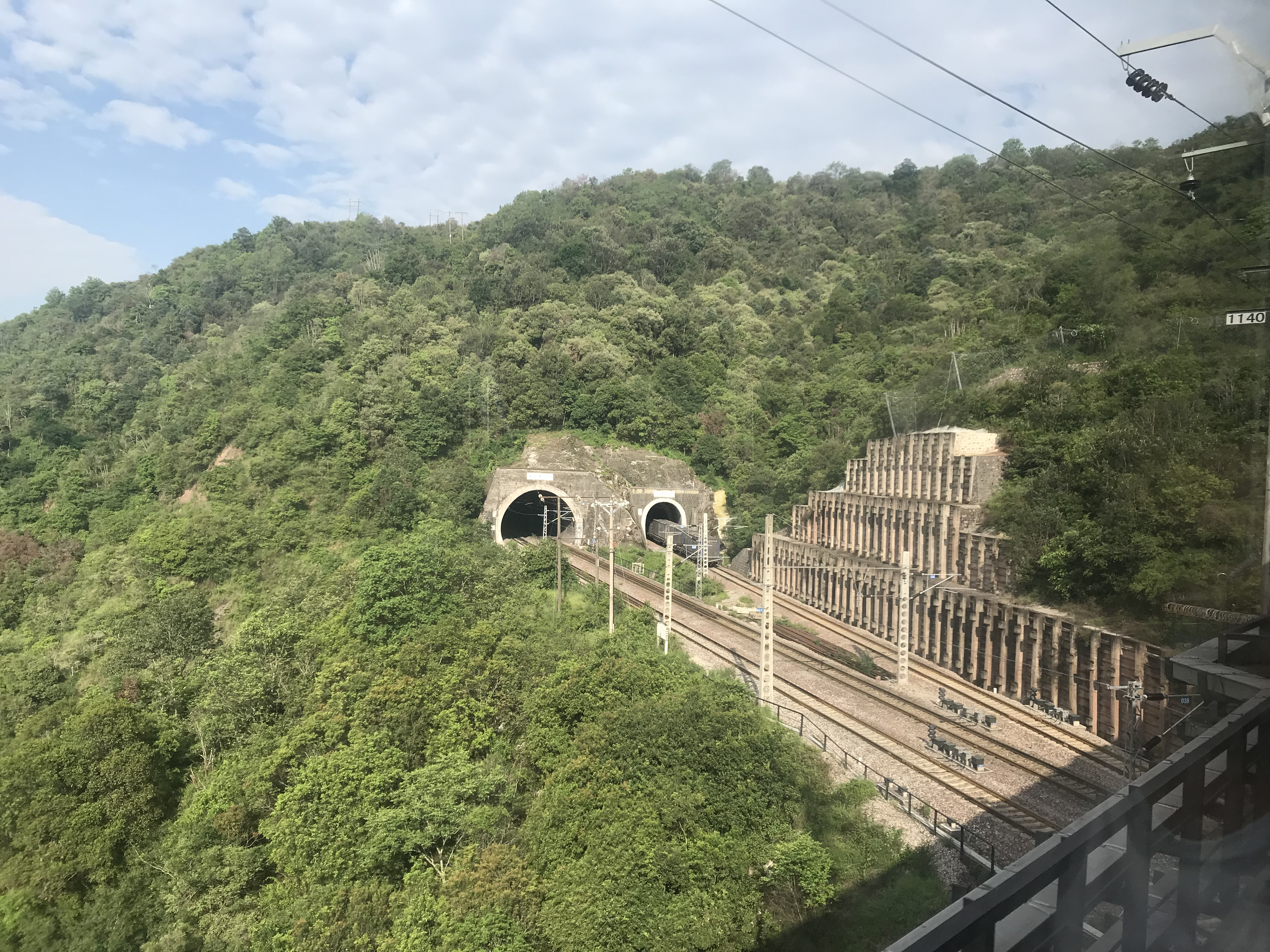
Mimalong Tunnel 1 and 2

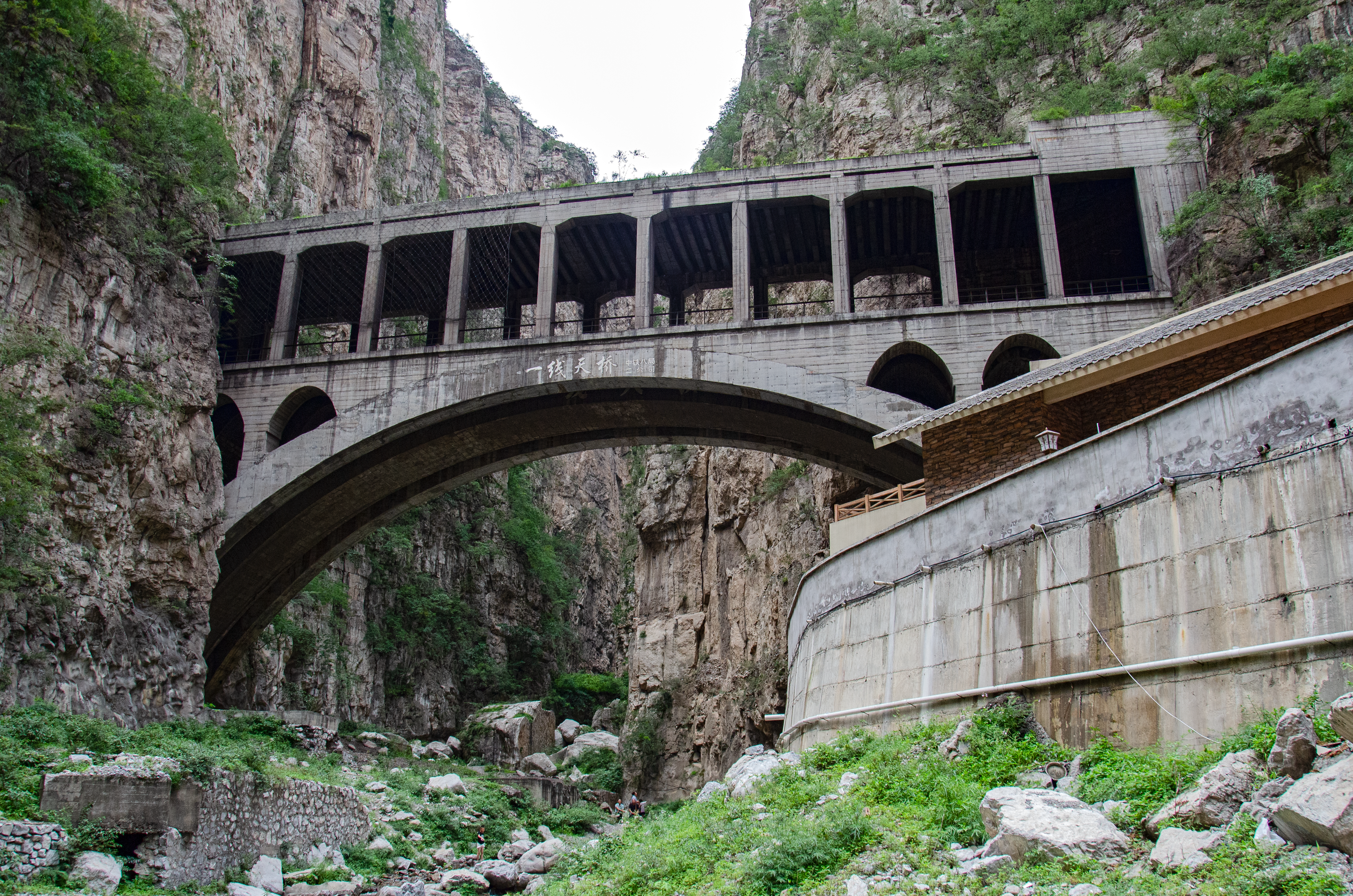
Laochanggou tunnel and Yixiantian bridge

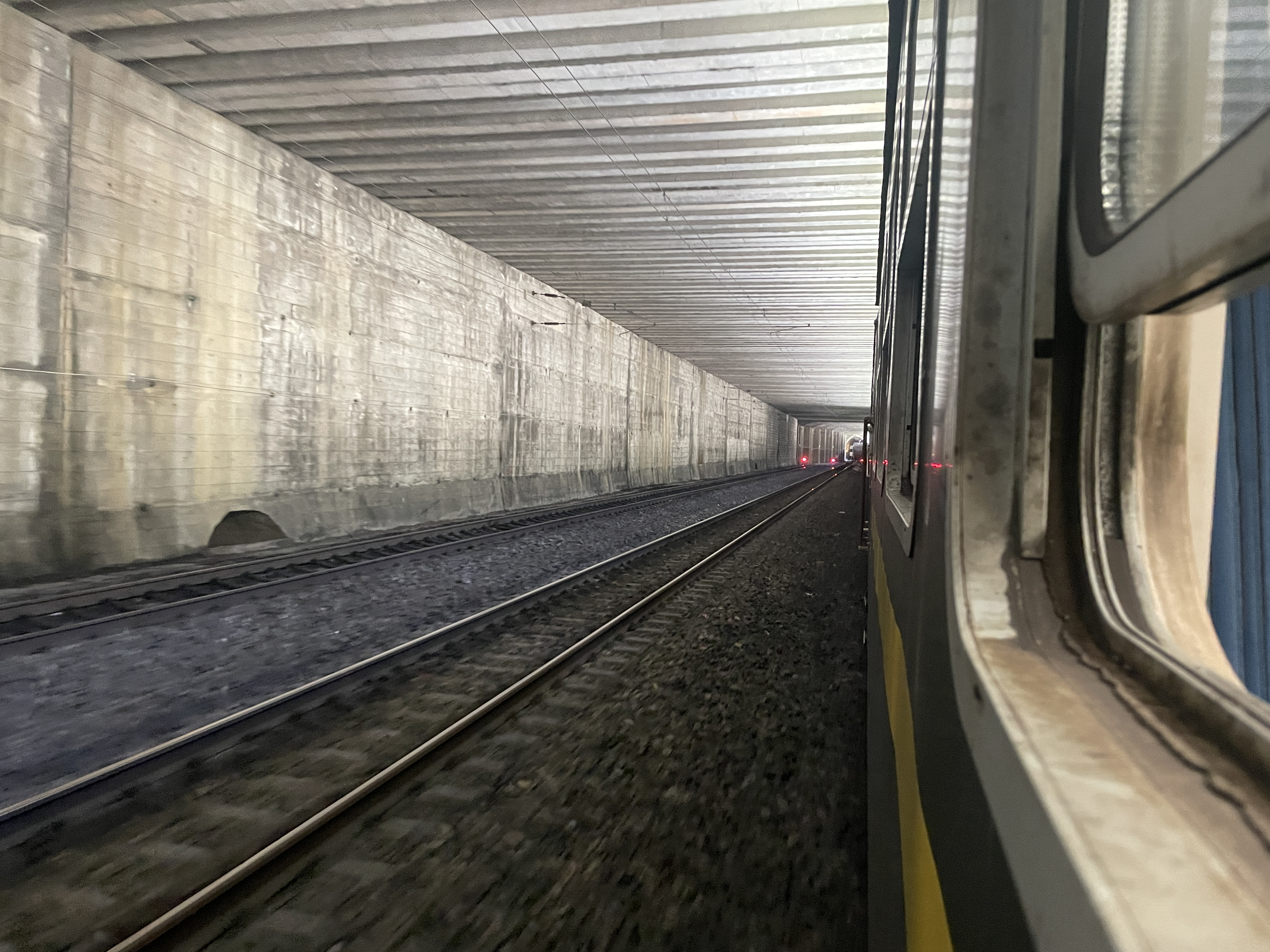
Niri station three-track covered trench

As the demand for transport capacity of the Chengdu–Kunming railway increased, the existing line facilities could no longer meet the demand. In December 1986, the Second Survey and Design Institute of the Ministry of Railways completed the "Feasibility Study Report on Technical Transformation of the Chengdu–Kunming railway" according to the plan of the Ministry of Railways. In 1987, the preliminary survey work began, but was interrupted in the same year due to an adjustment of the plan. In September 1989, the Ministry of Railways presided over the review of the research report and submitted the "Report on the Project Proposal for Electrification of the Chengdu–Kunming railway" to the State Planning Commission in October. According to the project proposal report of the Ministry of Railways, the Second Survey and Design Institute arranged seven survey teams to start the full-line survey: in June 1990, the field survey work for the electrification of the Chengdu–Kunming railway was completed, including the preliminary survey and exploration work of the main line of the Chengdu–Kunming railway, the Chengdu and Kunming hubs and the Dukou branch line. From March to October, the preliminary design of the electrification of the Chengdu-Kunming Railway was completed.

The electrification project of Chengdu–Kunming railway includes three parts: track reconstruction at stations, line electrification and key defect treatment. From December 1992 to September 1993, the preliminary survey, track reconstruction design and line electrification technical design of the Shuangliu to Panzhihua section were completed. In May 1994, the preliminary survey of the whole line was completed. From April 1994 to February 1995, the Second Railway Survey and Design Institute completed the post-station technical design of the Panzhihua to Wenquan section. In September 1997, the track reconstruction at stations design for the whole line was completed. In 1998, the post-station construction design of the whole line was completed.

The technical renovation of the station front included the construction of six new stations, the extension of some intermediate stations to the arrival and departure tracks and the addition of a third track, (Note: Due to the sparse population and difficult terrain, some passing stations on the line did not follow the general rule of setting up three tracks, but only had two tracks.) the expansion of the Xichang South station site, and the reconstruction of some station passenger buildings. The key projects for adding a third track included the Zhenxi third line bridge, the Guancunba third line tunnel, the Niri third line bridge, the Huapengzi third line bridge, and the Mimalong No. 2 tunnel. In 1993, Hualongmen and Huilongan stations were opened, and in 1995, Shizhuang station and Xiaoyuejiu station were newly opened. Meanwhile, passenger buildings at Meishan, Leshan (now Jiajiang), Emei, Xichang and Xichang South were rebuilt during the technical renovation of the station front.

The electrification of the Chengdu–Kunming railway in Sichuan Province began on 26 December 1994. The electrified sections of Shuangliu to Yangang, Puxiong to Xichang South, Xichang South to Panzhihua, and Yangang to Puxiong were opened to traffic on 22 December 1998, 25 September 1999, 26 December 1999, and 29 December 1999, respectively. On December 30, 1999, the Sichuan Provincial Government and the Chengdu Railway Bureau held a ceremony at Chengdu station to mark the opening of the electrified Chengdu–Kunming railway in Sichuan Province. The electrification project in Yunnan Province began on 1 June 1998, and was constructed by the Kunming Railway Bureau. On 30 September 2000, the electrification project of the Chengdu–Kunming railway in Yunnan Province was put into operation, and the entire Chengdu–Kunming railway was electrified. Subsequently, on 21 May 2001, the second track between Kunming and Kunming West was opened.

In addition, the railway department also carried out treatment on the key defects of the Chengdu–Kunming railway. The treatment project for key defects in the Sichuan section started in 2002 and was completed in 2004. The main projects included replacing the bottom of 6 tunnels (including the Shamarada Tunnel), building 12 new tunnels (including the Niri third track tunnel and the Laochanggou tunnel and Yixiantian stone arch bridge), treating 10 debris flow gullies, laying 116,000 m^{2} (1,250,000 sq ft) of geotextile, and erecting 4,249 m^{2} (45,740 sq ft) of flexible protective netting.

== Chengdu–Kunming double-track railway ==
=== Engineering construction ===
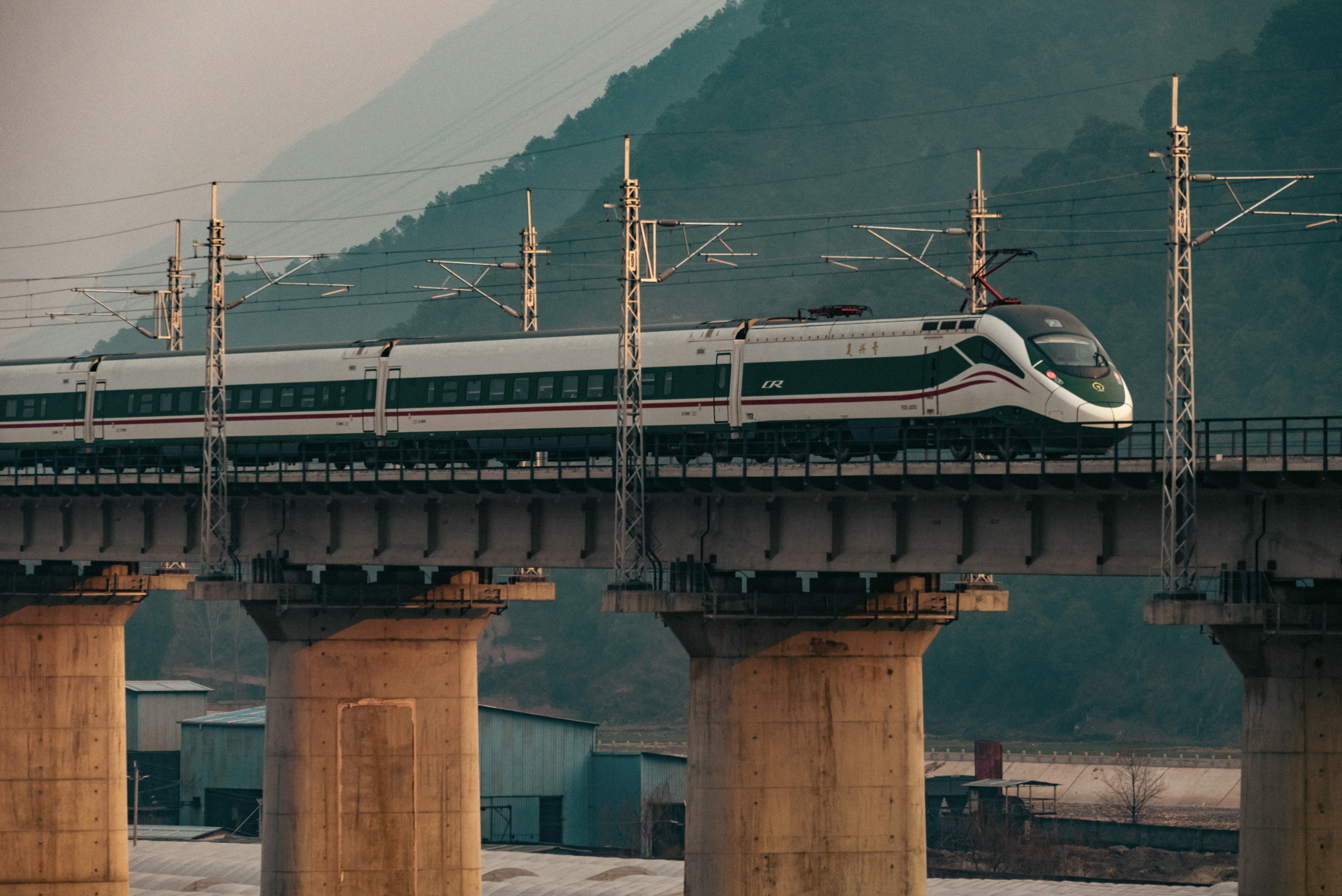
CR200J3 EMU running on the Mianshan Grand Bridge of the Emeishan–Guangtong railway

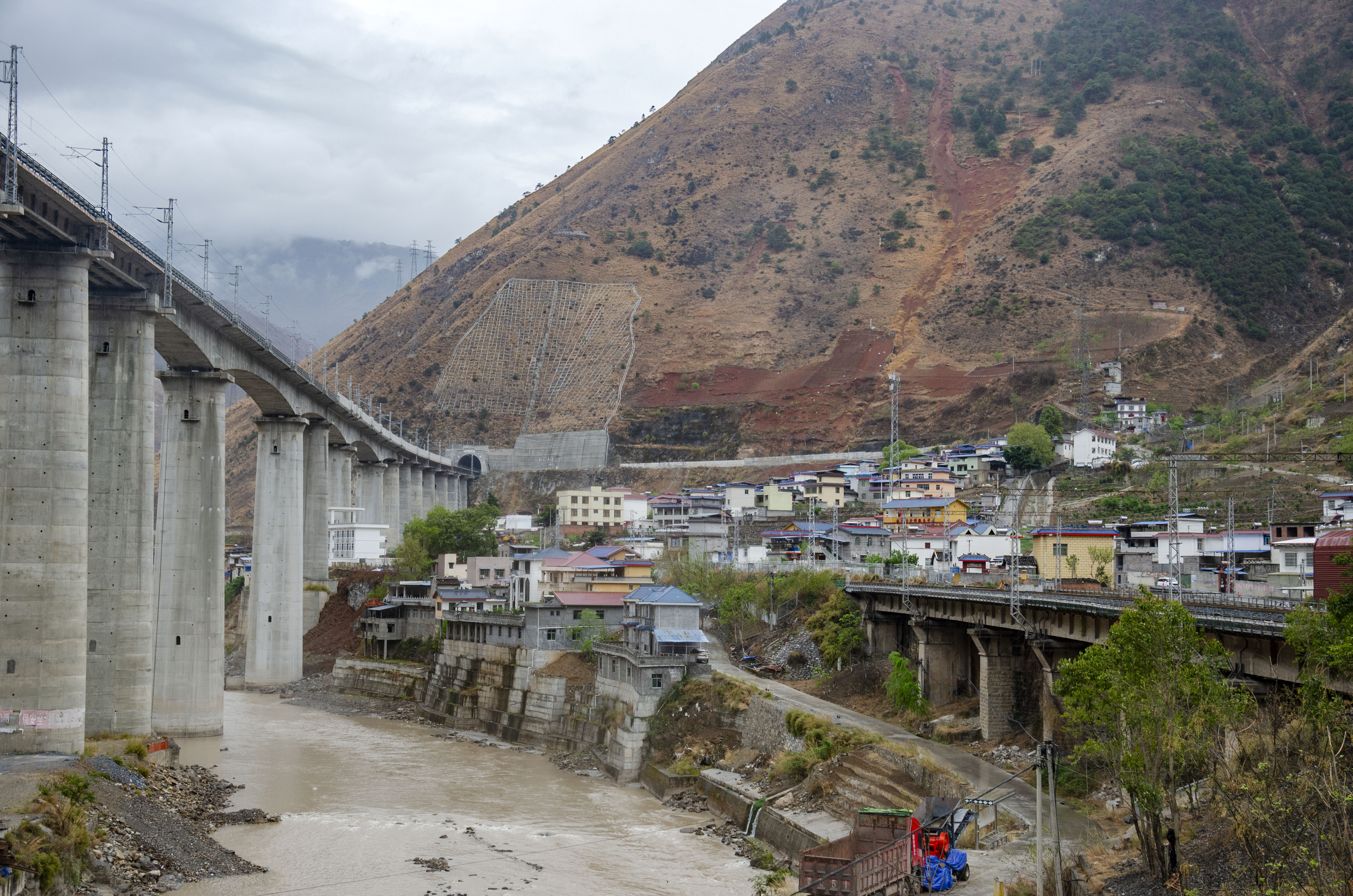
Near Aidai station, the Emei section of the Emeishan–Guangtong railway (left) and the Chengdu–Kunming Railway (right) run parallel in the open in the Niuri River Valley

With the development of the economy and industries along the Chengdu–Kunming railway, the line, which still operates as a single-track in two-way mode, was already overloaded. In order to provide sufficient capacity, the railway department decided to build a second track in sections, with the route basically following the old line, but in some sections, the curves were straightened to shorten the length of the line. The entire line was divided into five sections: Chengdu to Emei, Emei to Miyi, Miyi to Panzhihua, Yongren to Guangtong, (Note: The double track between Panzhihua and Yongren is part of the Yongren to Guangtong section of the project.) and Guangtong to Kunming, and each section received capacity expansion and renovation projects.

A list of commencement and opening times for each section of the Chengdu-Kunming Railway expansion and renovation project.
Section start and end		Start date	Opening date	Remarks
Start	End	Start date	Opening date	Remarks
Chengdu	Emei	25 December 2013	21 December 2017	(Note: The capacity expansion and renovation method for this section of the line is to build a new line next to the existing line.)
Emei	Miyi	26 April 2016	26 December 2022	
Miyi	Panzhihua	27 December 2013	26 May 2020	
Panzhihua	Yongren		6 January 2020	
Yongren	Guangtong	December 2013	9 October 2019	
Guangtong	Kunming	18 October 2007	27 December 2013	

With the gradual opening of the double-track expansion project, passenger transport on the existing Chengdu–Kunming railway has also changed. On 1 April 2014, train 6161/2 no longer passed through the Chengdu-Kunming Railway between Guangtong and Wenquan. From May of the same year, all stations on the Chengdu–Kunming railway between Guangtong and Wenquan that were still handling passenger services lost their passenger services. With the opening of the Miyi–Panzhihua section of the Chengdu–Kunming railway double-track, when passenger trains on the existing Chengdu–Kunming railway resumed operation on 1 January 2021, the T8869/8870 train, which originally terminated at Panzhihua station, was changed to originate and terminate at Panzhihua South station. The train no longer ran over the old Chengdu–Kunming line between Panzhihua South and Miyi East, but instead ran over the Miyi-Panzhihua double-track and the Miyi connecting line.

After the Emei–Guangzhou railway was fully opened to traffic at the end of 2022, the T8869/70 and T8865/66 trains that originally ran south of Emei via the old Chengdu–Kunming railway were discontinued. Although the Chengdu Railway Bureau resumed the T8865/66 train on weekends after the summer of 2023, the trains ran south of Emei via the Emei–Guangzhou railway. Since then, the existing Chengdu–Kunming railway south of Emei has mainly been used for freight and short-distance passenger transport operations.

==== Kunming to Guangtong section double track project ====
With the opening of the Emei–Guangtong railway, Kunming Railway Bureau Group plans to transform the Kunming–Guangtong section of the Chengdu–Kunming railway into a double-track railway. (Note: The Kunming–Guangtong railway was to be built as a separate double-track railway in the capacity expansion and renovation project.) The specific line project consists of the construction of a second track between Dianwei and Dushupu stations and the connecting line between Dianwei and Guangtong stations.

== Influence and Culture ==
=== Public welfare slow train ===
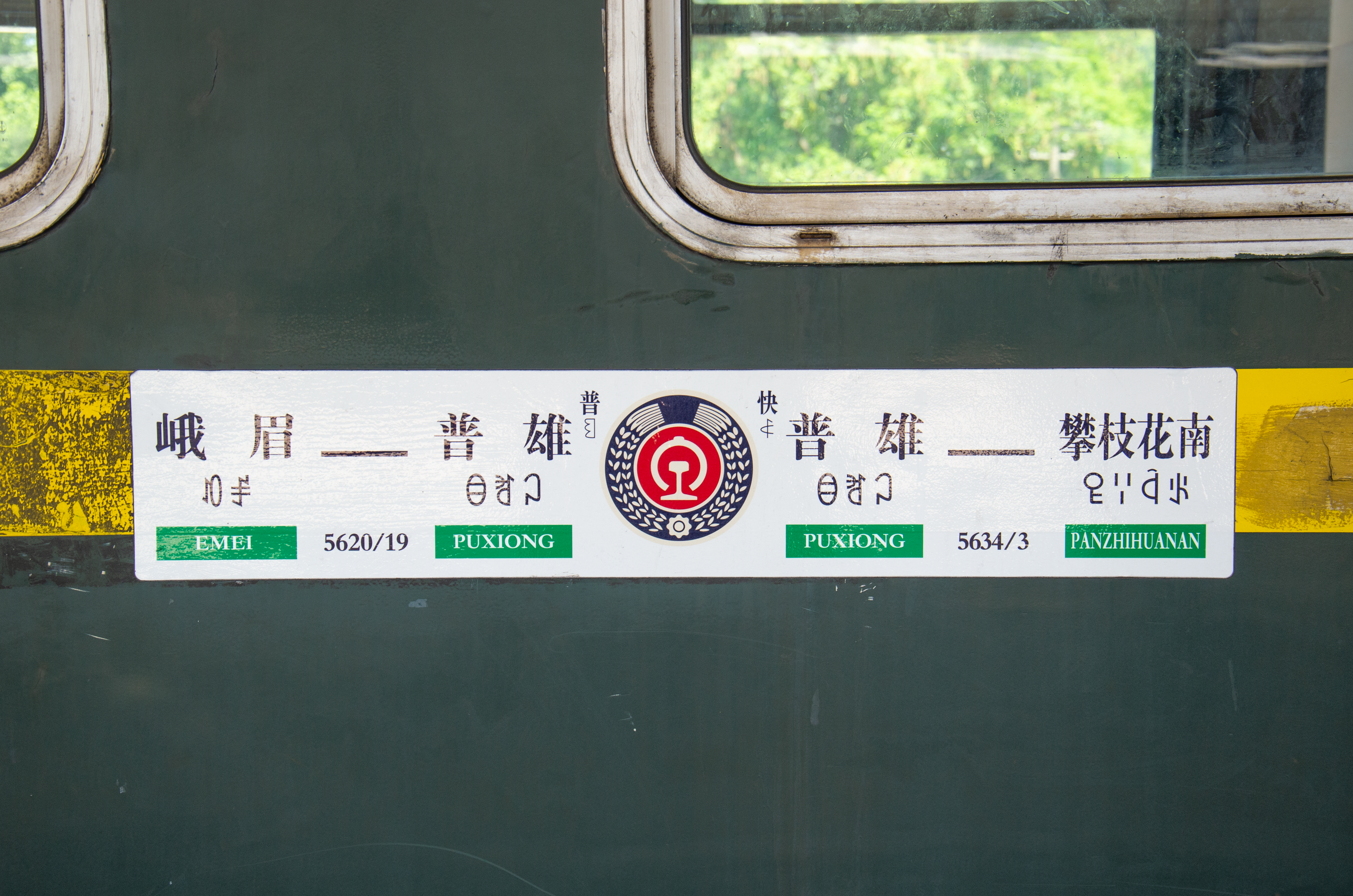
The information boards for passenger trains 5619/5620 and 5633/5634 are displayed. To facilitate the Yi people of Liangshan, the origin and destination station names and train class are labeled in Nuosu (Liangshan Yi) in addition to Chinese.

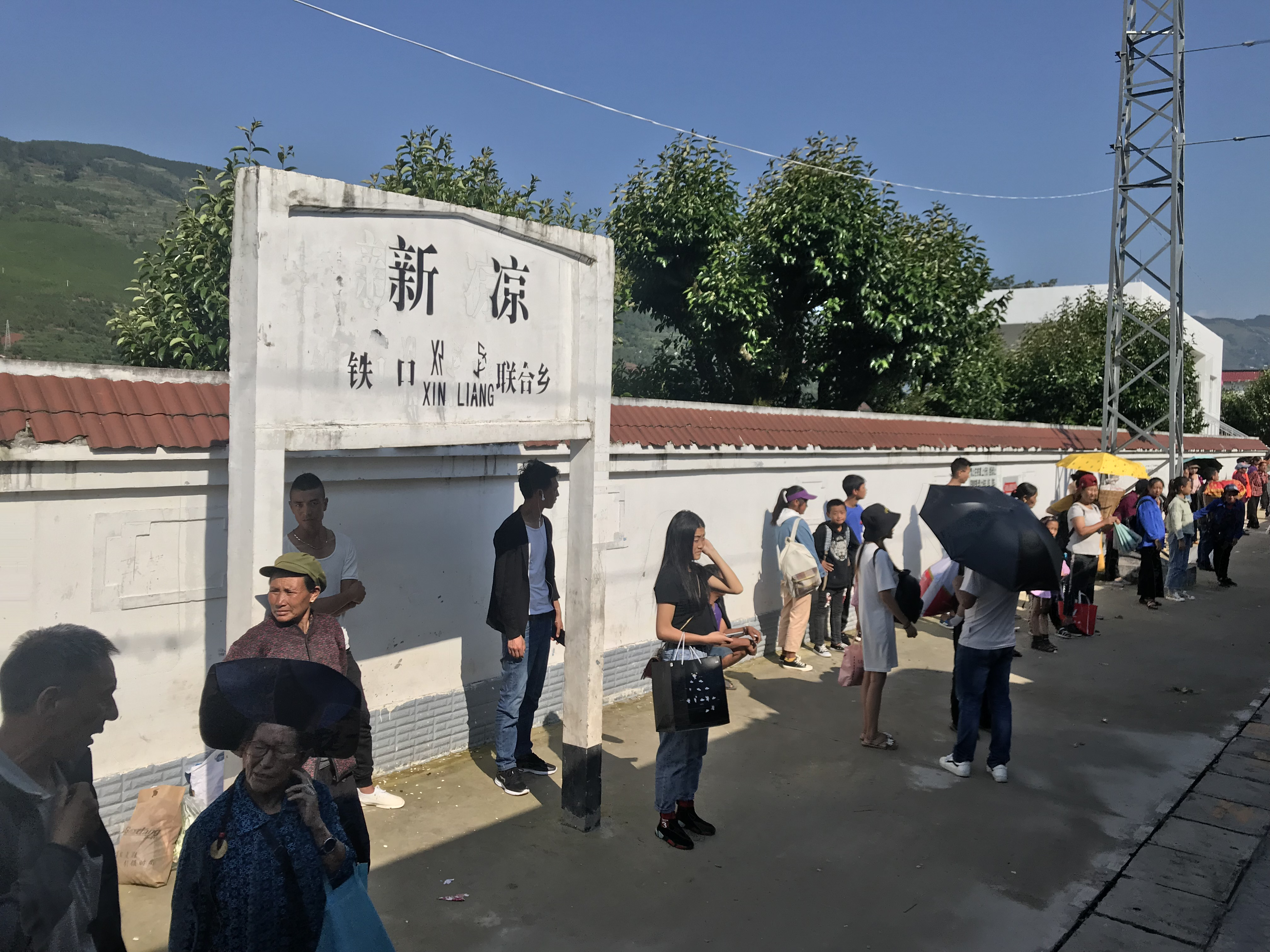
Local residents waiting to board the public welfare slow train at Xinliang station

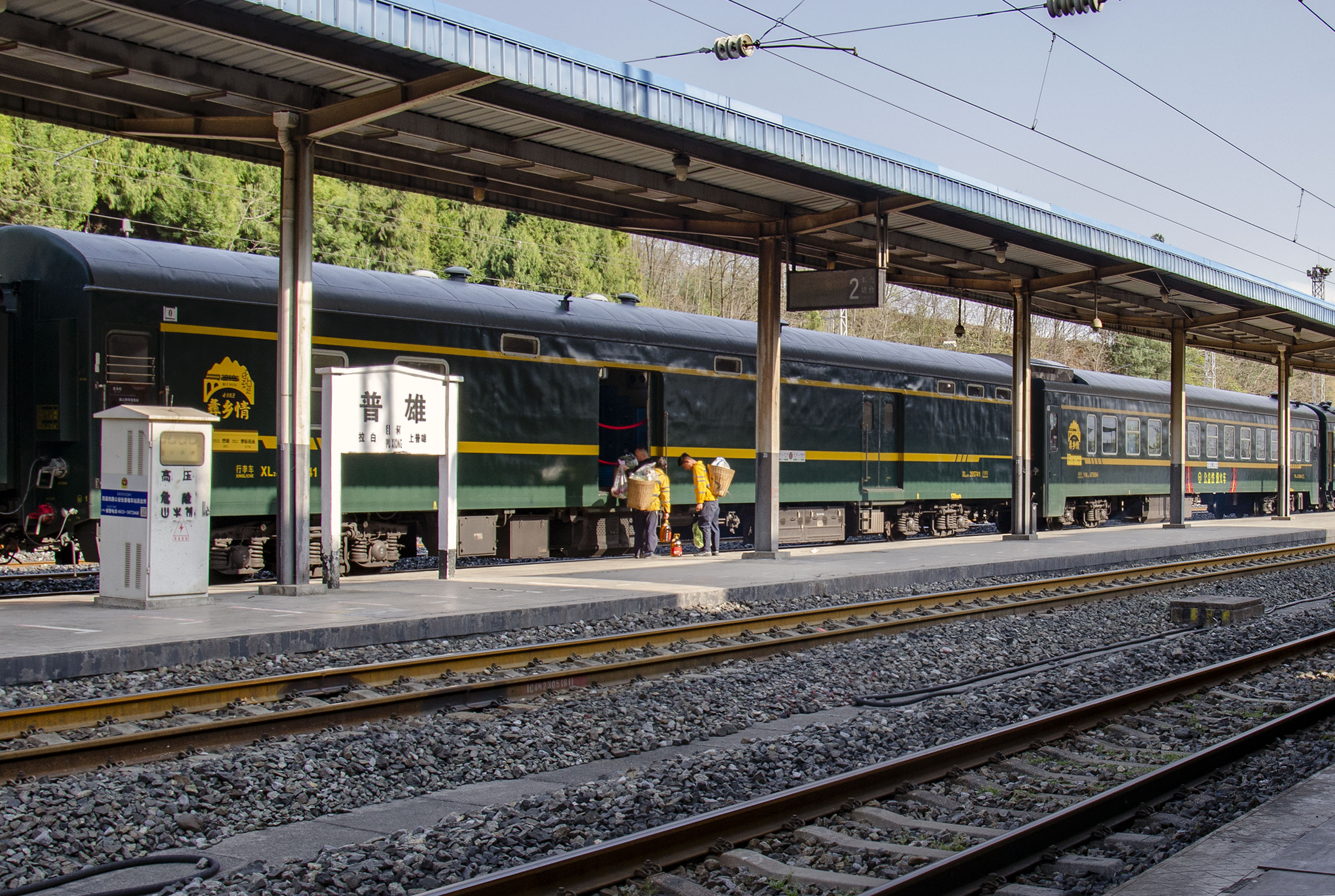
Railway workers also rely on slow trains to transport daily necessities.

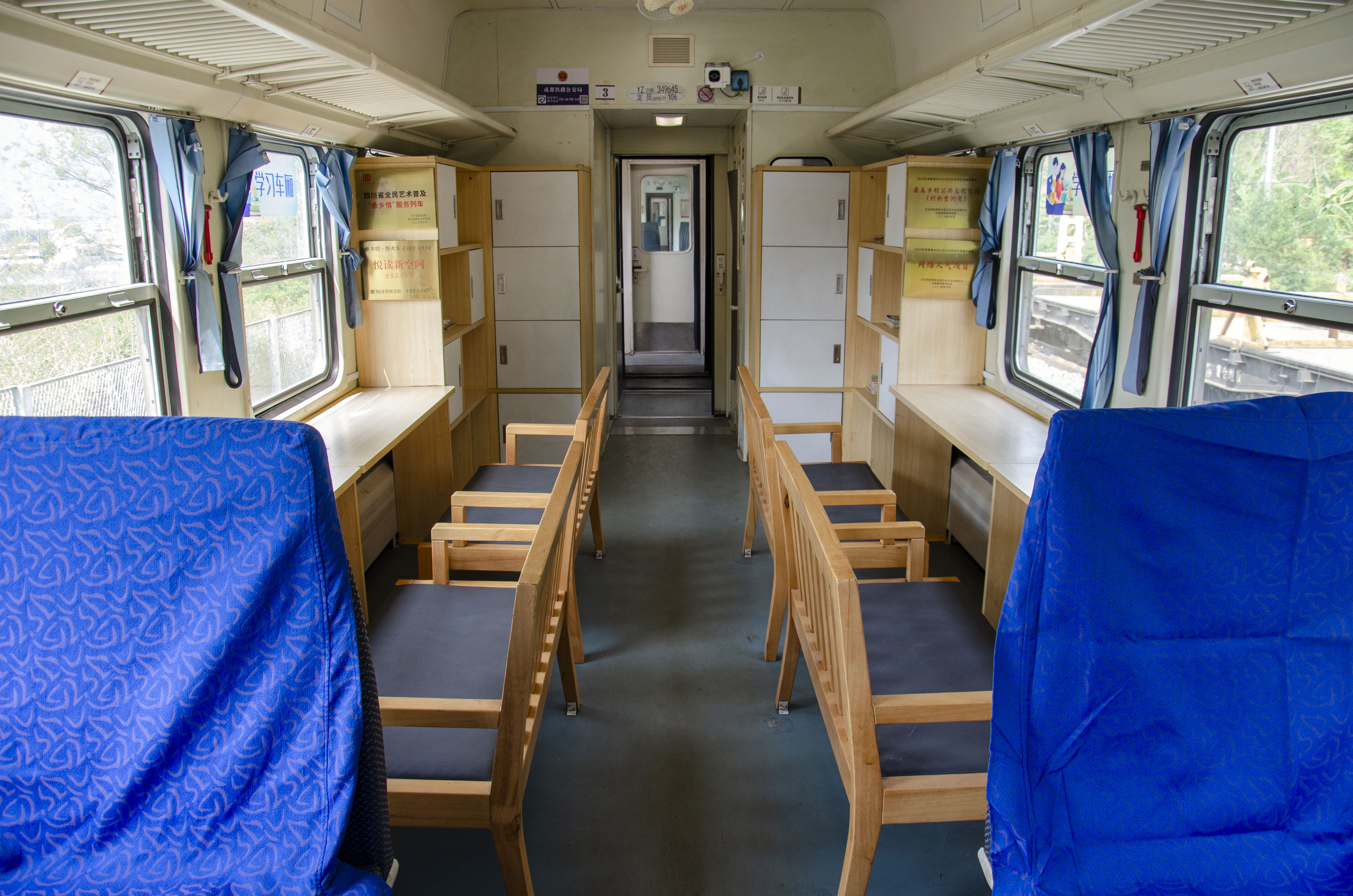
The Learning Carriage of the Public Welfare Slow Train

Since its opening, the Chengdu-Kunming Railway has been operating regular passenger trains that stop at each station. Currently, only one pair of "slow trains" operates daily on the Emei–Guangtong North section of the Chengdu–Kunming railway, namely the 5619/5620 train from Emei to Puxiong, the 5633/5634 train from Puxiong to Panzhihua South, and the 7465/7466 train from Yuanmou West to Kunming.

The Emei–Puxiong–Panzhihua South trains 5619/5620 and 5633/5634 were originally ordinary passenger trains from Chengdu to Dukou. In 1978, they were extended to Geliping. In February 1989, they were split into two sections with Puxiong as the boundary. Later, due to passenger flow reasons, the operating sections of the two trains were shortened to Emei and Panzhihua South respectively At present, the two trains share a set of passenger train carriages. In early 2023, the Chengdu Railway Bureau of China Railway upgraded and transformed the carriages of the two trains 5619/5620 and 5633/5634, named the carriages "Yixiangqing", and built facilities such as "study carriages" and "large luggage carriages" to facilitate passengers along the line to go to school and carry goods. The Yuanmou West–Kunming 7465/7466 train was originally the Jinjiang–Kunming train launched in 1971, and used train numbers such as 6161/6162. In 2020, due to the Wudongde project, the route was shortened to Yuanmou West station.

Among the three pairs of ordinary passenger trains, the 5619/5620 and 5633/5634 trains have a profound impact on ethnic minorities in Liangshan, especially the Yi people. These two pairs of ordinary passenger trains maintained a minimum ticket price of 2 yuan from 1995 to 2018. The low ticket price has made the slow trains the "lifeline" of the Yi people in Liangshan. They rely on the slow trains for going to and from school, going to the market, visiting relatives and friends and other outings. The passenger carriages of the trains also have special spaces for storing large luggage, bricks and tiles and even poultry and livestock.

=== Cultural significance ===
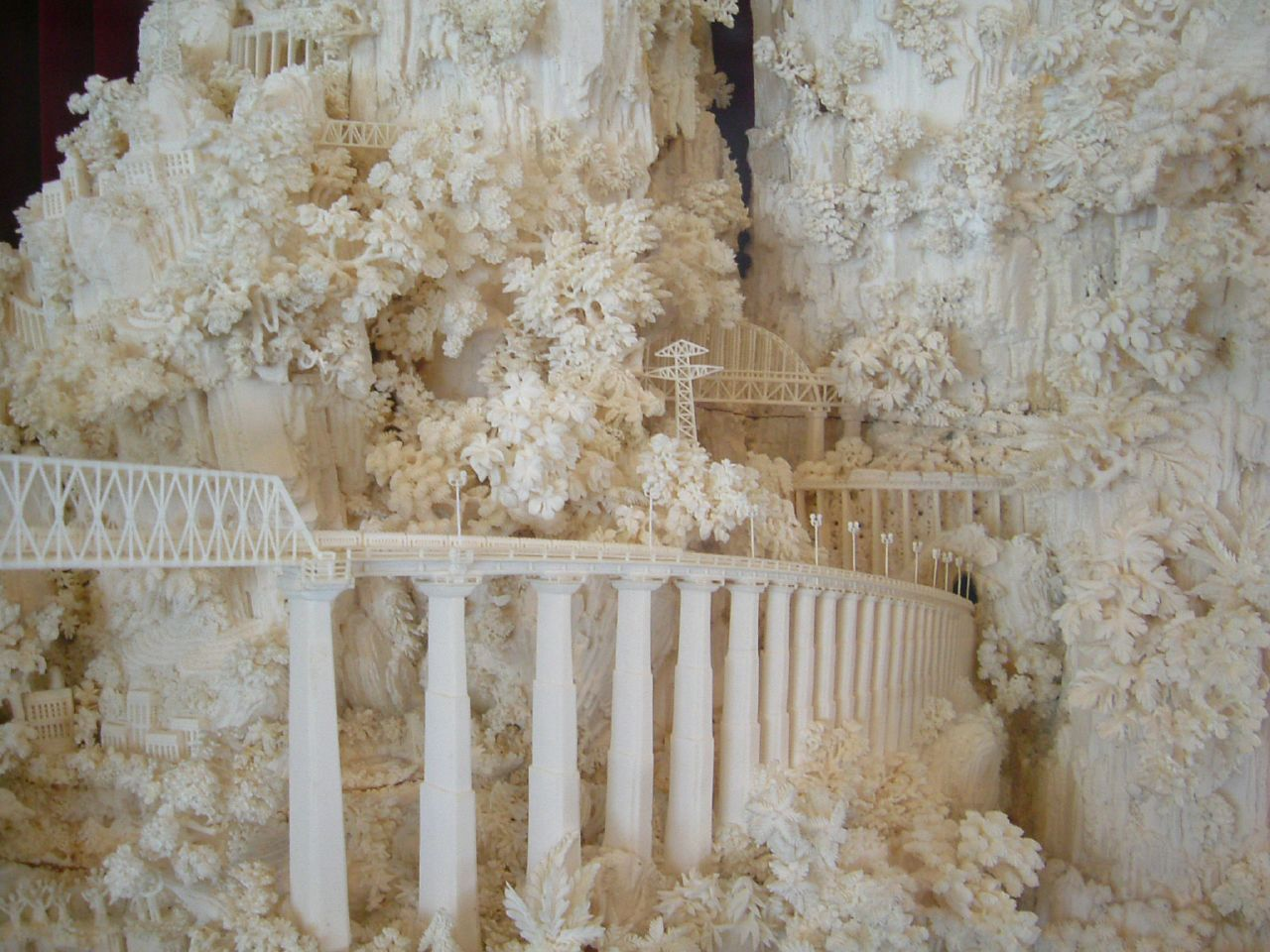
Ivory carving of the Chengdu–Kunming railway presented as a gift to the United Nations on display at UN Headquarters in New York

The Chengdu–Kunming railway connects Sichuan and Yunnan provinces, and the area it passes through covers seven prefectures and cities and more than fifty counties under their jurisdiction. The western Sichuan plain, the area around Xichang, and the area from Yuanmou to Kunming that the line passes through have developed agricultural resources, as well as mineral deposits such as coal, iron, copper, lead, and asbestos along the line. The river valleys along the line are rich in forest and water resources. Its construction has played an important role and significance in many aspects, such as strengthening national unity, promoting resource development and economic development, and developing national defense construction.

As far as transportation is concerned, after the completion of the Chengdu–Kunming railway, it is connected with several major transportation lines and has become an important trunk line in China's railway network, and is also a component of the "Lanzhou–Kunming corridor". Relying on the Chengdu–Kunming railway, there are Chengdu-Chongqing, Baoji-Chengdu, and Guiyang-Kunming lines nearby; and Guizhou-Guangxi and Hunan-Guizhou lines further away. People in the southwest region can reach Shaanxi and Gansu to the north, and Guizhou, Hunan, and Guangxi to the east and south, which makes the transportation in the southwest region more convenient to the outside world.

In terms of economy and culture, the completion of the Chengdu–Kunming railway will enable the development of various natural resources along the line. Under the background of the Third Front construction, various industrial and agricultural facilities in the southwest region can also rely on the Chengdu–Kunming railway to develop rapidly. The southwest region along the line also has many natural landscapes and rich historical culture. Many tourist resources along the line have been developed by relying on the Chengdu–Kunming railway. Therefore, the Chengdu–Kunming railway has become a "golden route" for tourism in the eyes of the public.

For ethnic minorities, the Chengdu–Kunming railway passes through many ethnic minority settlements. After the railway was built, it changed the previously isolated environment of these areas that were blocked by high mountains and rivers. In addition to strengthening the interaction and exchange between ethnic groups at the cultural level, it also made it easier to introduce various technologies and talents from other parts of the mainland and even overseas to carry out economic and cultural exchanges with these areas, thereby improving the development of these areas. In addition, after the railway was built, it could unite the ethnic minorities along the line, thereby further maintaining the unity of China and the stability of the border areas.

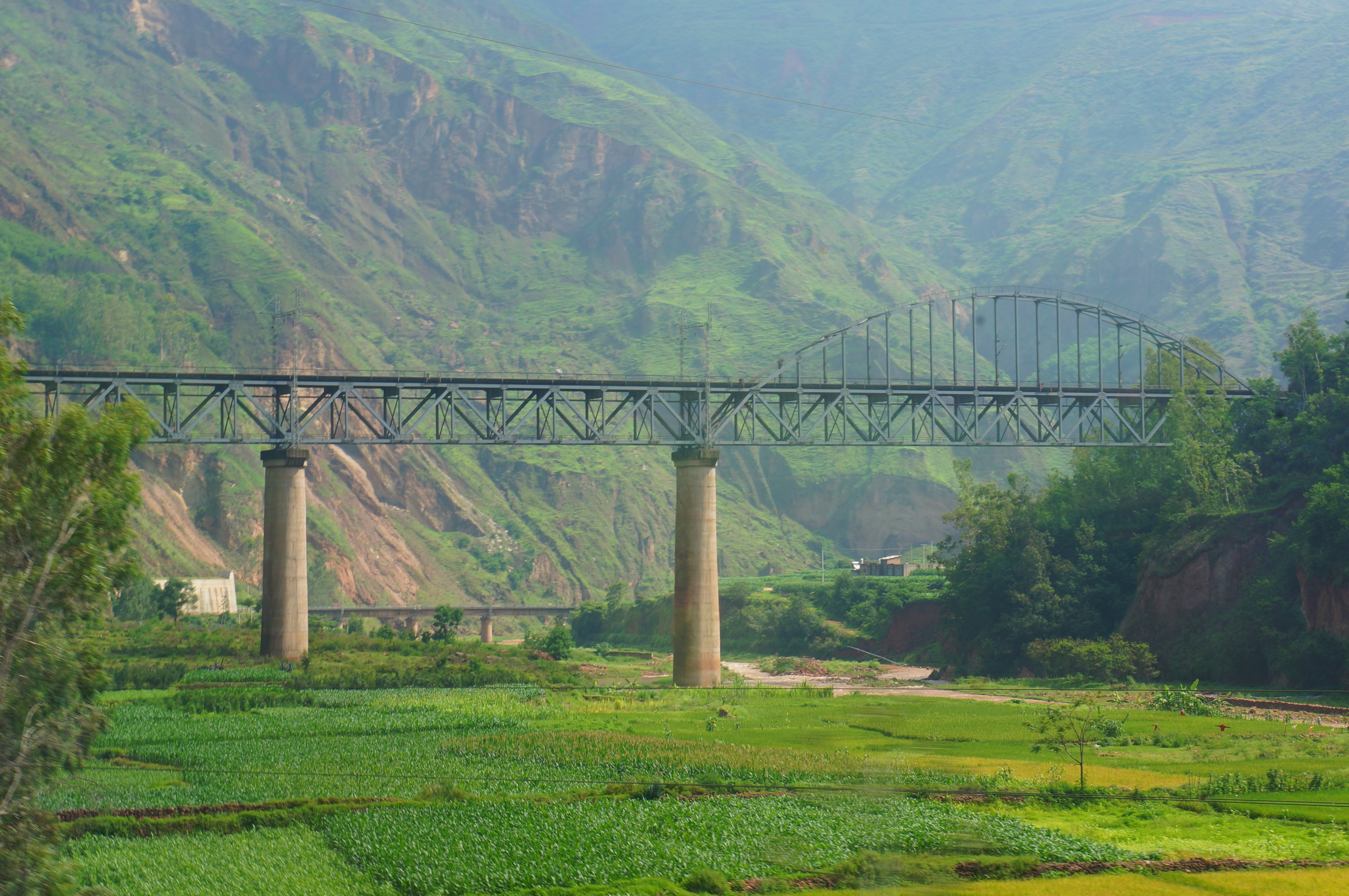
The Tongmodian No. 2 Longchuanjiang Bridge uses a 112 m (367 ft) tied-arch bridge for its main span, which was close to the largest span of the same type of bolted and welded steel bridge in the world at that time. The Lugu Anning River Bridge, the Lajiu Bridge (now demolished), and the Yingshui River Bridge along the line also use this type of bridge.

In terms of engineering technology, more than 50 technologies were created and promoted during the construction of the Chengdu–Kunming railway, and more than 760 kinds of equipment were created and innovated. In terms of bridges, the entire line used a large number of bolted and welded steel bridges. Compared with the previous riveted and welded steel bridges, the bridges created under the new technology not only saved steel but were also easier to build. In addition, the bridge erecting machine and track laying machine independently developed by China were used for the first time. In terms of tunnels, the entire line relied on the "100-meter tunnel" and other sports to quickly construct and complete several key long tunnels, including the Guancunba and Liandi tunnels, ensuring that the railway opened to traffic on schedule. In addition, the anchor bolt shotcrete support was practiced for the first time. The new technologies in bridges, tunnels and other aspects were tried and practiced during the construction of the Chengdu–Kunming railway, which not only represented that China's railway construction had reached an advanced level at that time, but also provided reference experience for the construction of new railways in the future.

In 1974, an ivory sculpture commemorating the completion of the Chengdu–Kunming railway was presented as a gift to the United Nations and is displayed at the U.N. Headquarters in New York. The sculpture depicts the rail bridge across the Dadu River between two mountain peaks, with intricate details of passengers inside the train. The sculpture, 150 cm (59 in) in length and 110 cm (43 in) in height, was made from eight elephant tusks and weighs over 300 kilograms (660 lb). Along with the lunar rock brought back by the American Apollo spacecraft and the model of the Soviet Union's first artificial satellite, it was recognized by the United Nations as "three gifts symbolizing mankind's conquest of nature and entry into outer space". In July 1978, at the invitation of the Ministry of Railways, the "Japan Railways China Friendship Delegation" led by Takagi Fumio, then president of Japan National Railways, visited China. After a four-day inspection in Beijing, the delegation flew to Kunming on 23 July. Afterwards, the delegation took a 24-hour overnight train along the Chengdu–Kunming railway to Chengdu. During this time, Takagi Fumio also rode in the locomotive cab to inspect the line. In 1985, the construction technology of the Chengdu–Kunming railway won the National Science and Technology Progress Special Prize.

Academic Covell F. Meyskens writes that the Chengdu–Kunming railway serves as a symbol of the Communist Party's technical ability to remake the Chinese landscape in accord with its own vision, comparing its function in this regard to the Ten Great Buildings.

== Major accidents ==
The entire Chengdu–Kunming railway has four sections prone to debris flows, including the Anning River Valley Manshuiwan - Xichang section, the Jinsha River Valley Yizi - Dawanzi section, the Longchuan River Valley section and the Niuri River Valley section. The Anning River Valley and the Longchuan River Valley did not experience large-scale debris flow disasters after construction due to reasonable route selection and local water and soil management measures. However, the Niuri River Valley has a relatively fast main river velocity due to factors such as short gully body, steep gully bed and unstable gully slope. The geological conditions of the Niuri River were not given enough attention during route selection, and debris flow disasters occurred many times in this section (Niri - Suxiong, Lianghong - Aida section) after construction. Foreign experts once predicted that "even if the Chengdu–Kunming railway is built, the violent nature will surely turn it into a pile of scrap iron within 10 years". The US Central Intelligence Agency, in its "Image Analysis Service Description" released in October 1971, based on two signs of line repair caused by landslides detected in the first year of the line's opening, made the judgment that "this line will undoubtedly require more maintenance work than ordinary lines."

=== Human-caused accidents ===
On 28 April 1971, between Xiapuxiong Station and Tiexi Station on the Chengdu–Kunming railway, the No. 4302 passenger train failed to connect to the air pipe and its brakes failed, resulting in a head-on collision with the No. 9013 freight train, causing a major accident. The accident resulted in 26 deaths, 105 injuries, 14 freight cars were scrapped, 3 locomotives were scrapped, and traffic was interrupted for 80 hours and 34 minutes.

On 24 April 2006, Rimu Gan and three others decided to steal railway supplies at Shamalada station and arranged for Mahawa Ku and others to meet them. When Rimu Gan and the others were stealing on a freight train, some of the stolen cotton cloth fell off and spread out on the tracks, causing more than ten carriages of the train to derail, and the section of the train was interrupted for 16 hours and 59 minutes. The incident was later called the "'4.25' major damage to transportation facilities case".

=== Natural disasters ===
==== The 1981 Toshio Ida train crash ====
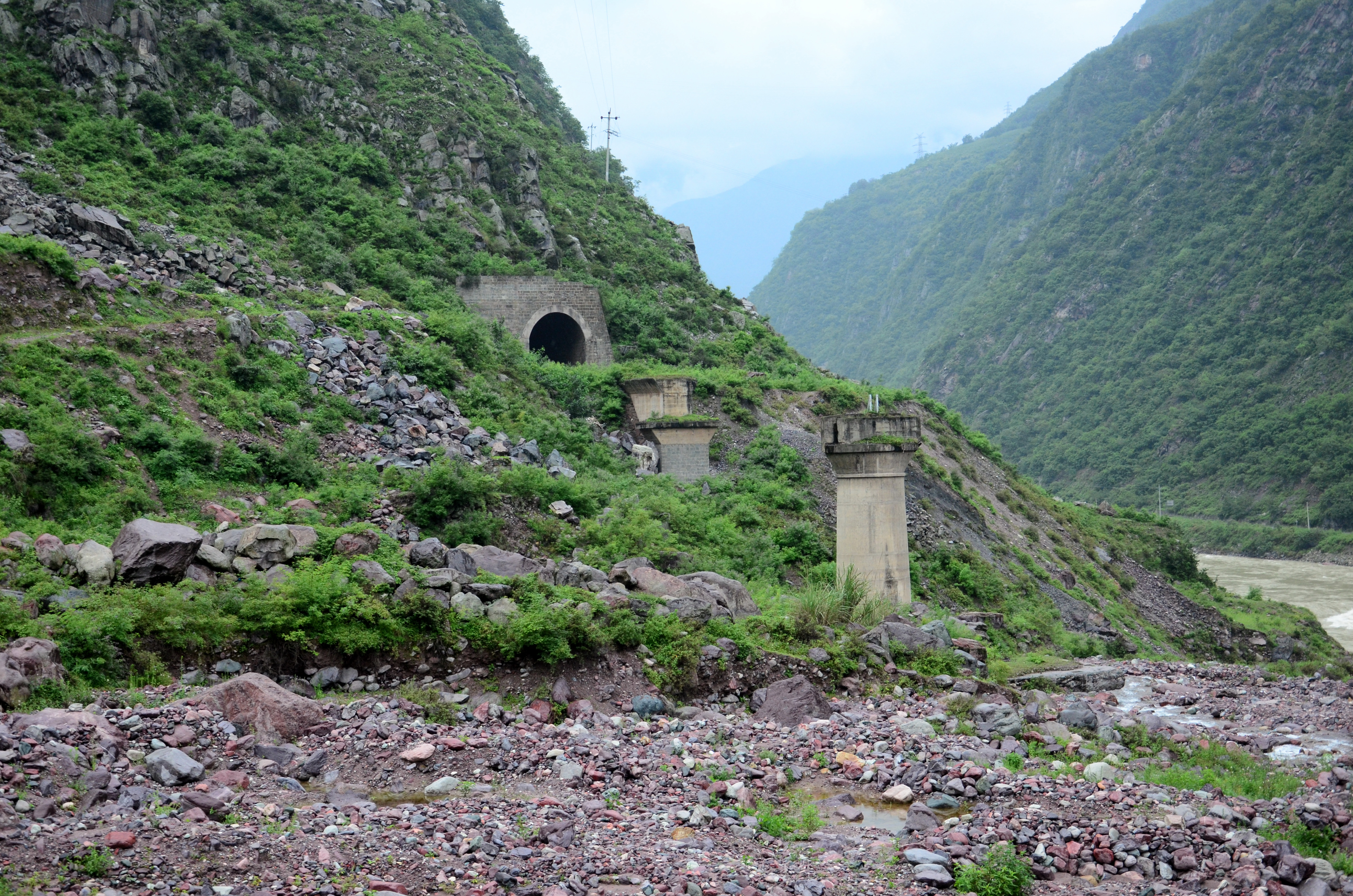
Site of the 1981 Chengdu–Kunming railway train crash bridge accident

In the early morning of 9 July 1981, the Liziyida Bridge on the Liziyida Gully, a tributary of the Dadu River, was destroyed by a mudslide. During this time, the No. 442 express passenger train was passing by, and two locomotives, one postal car, one baggage car and one passenger car fell into the river. The incident resulted in more than 240 deaths or disappearances, and the operation of the Chengdu–Kunming railway was interrupted for more than half a month. The affected section of the railway was rerouted and rebuilt.

==== Landslide accident in Ganluo section during the 2019 flood season and emergency rerouting project ====
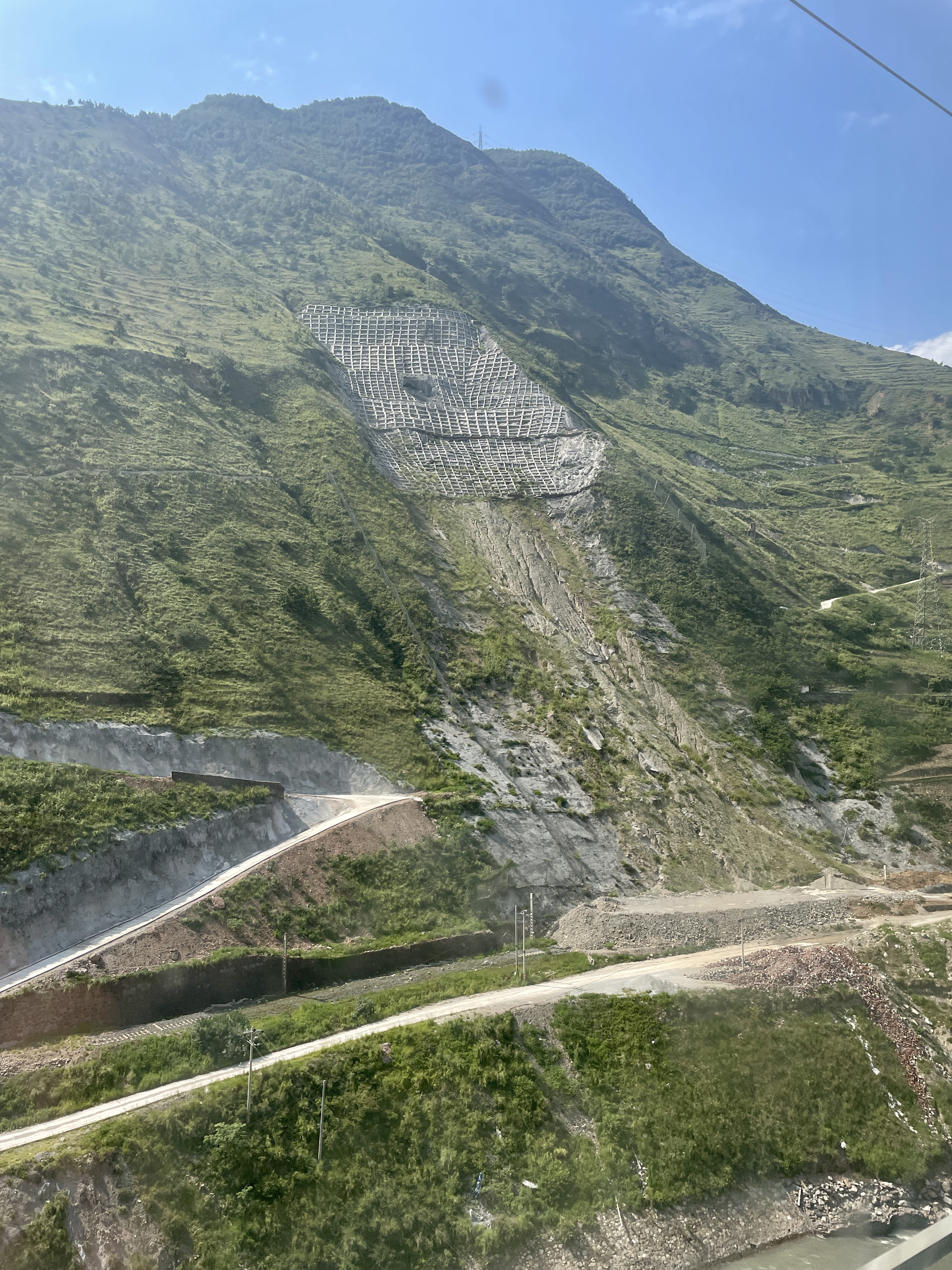
The landslide site near Aidai Station , known as the "August 14 Chengdu–Kunming railway landslide".

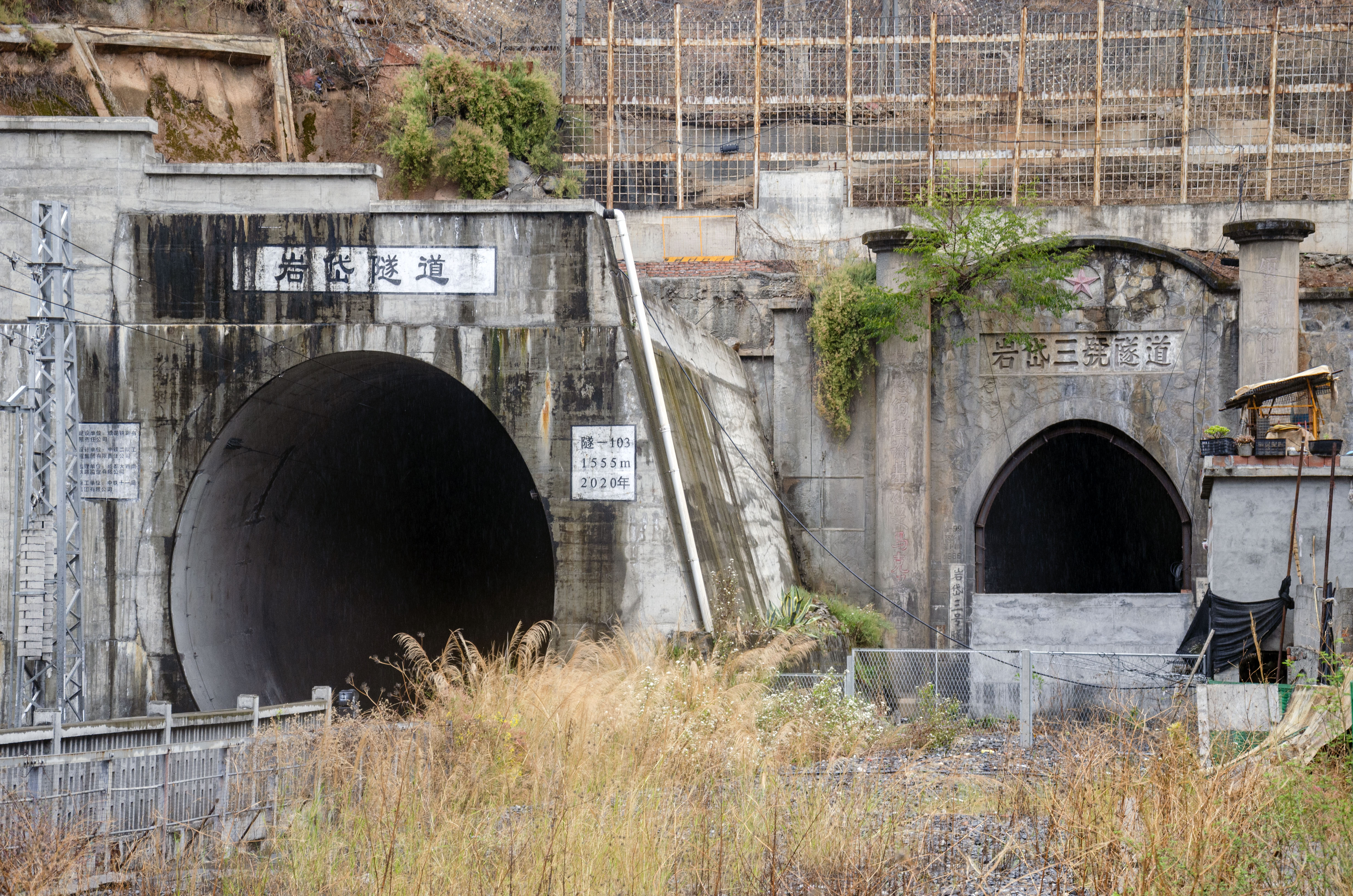
The newly built Kunming end of the Yandai Tunnel and the abandoned Kunming end of the Yandai No. 3 Tunnel

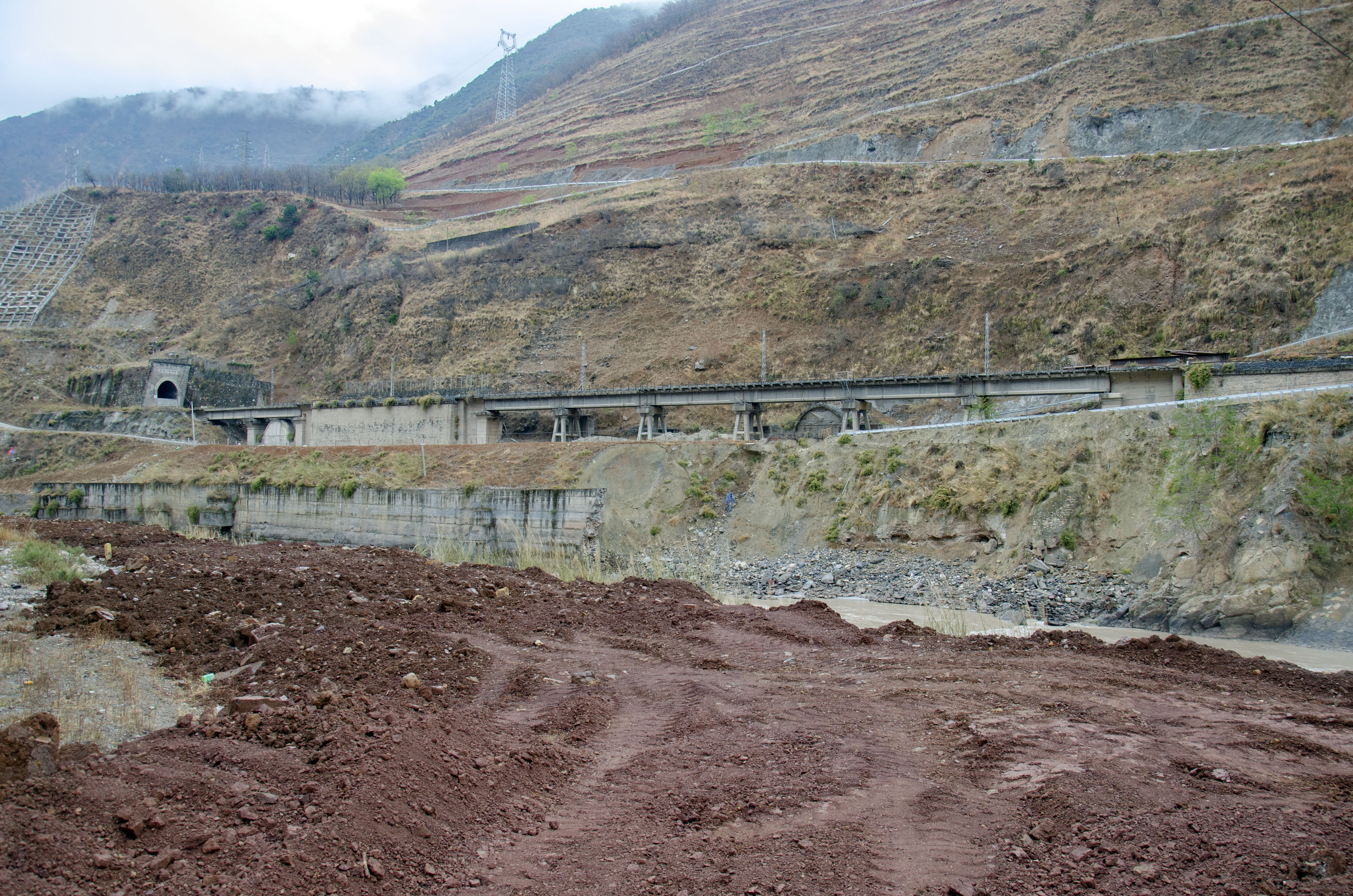
The Chengdu end of the Yandai No. 3 Tunnel and the Aidai Bridge were abandoned due to the accident. In order to meet the requirements of rapid construction, the Aidai Bridge adopted lightweight bench-type assembled bridge piers. Construction started on September 8, 1966, and was completed on the 28th of the same month. Due to its pier shape, the Aidai Bridge is commonly known as the "Bench Bridge".

In the summer of 2019, multiple geological disasters occurred in the Ganluo section of the Chengdu–Kunming railway. According to statistics from the Sichuan Provincial Flood Control and Drought Relief Headquarters, from 25 July to 15 August, the cumulative rainfall at the Yanrun Village Measurement Station in Xinshiba Town, Ganluo County reached 303 mm (11.9 in), while the average annual rainfall in Ganluo County is only 880 mm (35 in), exceeding 30% of the annual rainfall. After continuous heavy rainfall and exposure to sunlight, the mountain is prone to cracking and has a high probability of landslides.

On 29 July, due to continuous heavy rain, mudslides occurred between Lianghong and Aidai stations and between Ganluo and Nanergang stations on the Chengdu–Kunming railway, causing the line to be interrupted. After emergency repairs, freight trains were able to resume operation at 9:31 am on 2 August. However, a few days later, at around 9:40 am on August 4, a high-altitude landslide and mudslide occurred again on the right side of K310 between Lianghong and Aidai stations on the Chengdu–Kunming railway. More than 4,000 cubic meters of mud and rocks poured into the No. 1 tunnel of Zhaibangou, burying about 1,000 meters of the line. The mud reached a maximum depth of nearly 3.5 meters, causing the line to be interrupted again. After several days of continuous emergency repairs, freight trains resumed operation on August 10. At 12:44 on August 14, a landslide occurred at a height of more than 190 meters around the No. 2 and No. 3 tunnels of the Chengdu–Kunming railway (Yandai). Seventeen workers, including Yang Ming and He Yao, employees of the Xichang Railway Electrification Section of the Chengdu Railway Bureau, who were clearing silt and obstacles and cleaning the line at the exit of the No. 2 tunnel of the Chengdu–Kunming railway, were killed. The affected section resumed freight train service on October 25 of the same year, and resumed daytime passenger train service on 2 December.

Afterwards, the emergency repair department carried out a realignment project on the affected section of the road to avoid the adverse geological conditions. The project was undertaken by China Railway Eleventh Bureau Group. The project is 2.44 km (1.52 mi)–long and includes three projects: the construction of the Yandai Tunnel, the construction of the Laguzi Bridge, and the reconstruction of the Aidai Third Line Bridge. Construction started on 7 September 2019. The project was suspended due to the Lunar New Year holiday in 2020 and the impact of the COVID-19 pandemic. Construction resumed on 10 February 2020, the tunnel was completed on 9 March, the project passed the final acceptance on 26 April, and it was officially put into use at 22:00 on 27 April, two months ahead of schedule.

Due to the repeated geological disasters that occurred in the Ganluo section during the flood season that year, the long-distance trains on the Chengdu–Kunming railway were suspended from 31 July 2019. It was not until 2 December of that year that the railway department resumed the operation of some long-distance trains within its jurisdiction, and required passenger trains to only run during the daytime.

==== Rockfall in Hanyuan and mudslide in Heixiluo in 2020 ====
Due to continuous rainfall, a flash flood and mudslide occurred in Heixiluogou, Azijue Township, Ganluo County on 30 August 2020, which destroyed the Heixiluo Railway Bridge at K295+375 on the upstream direction of Suxiong station, (Note: Located at 29°09′01″N 102°52′16″E) and the Chengdu–Kunming railway was interrupted. The railway department used track maintenance vehicles to transfer local disaster-stricken people to Ganluo County.

This accident was the largest debris flow disaster in the Chengdu Railway Bureau Group since the Liziyida accident in 1981. The railway department planned to build a concrete roadbed with diversion culverts in Heixiluogou to temporarily restore the railway to operation. The railway was reopened on 13 September. Passenger service resumed on 1 January 2021. The railway department plans to build a tunnel and aqueduct at the accident site in the long term to ensure safety.

== Bibliography ==
=== "The Chengdu-Kunming Railway" by the Technical Summary Committee of the Chengdu-Kunming Railway ===
- Chengdu-Kunming Railway Technical Summary Committee (1981). Chengdu-Kunming Railway (in Chinese). Vol. 1: Comprehensive Summary. Beijing: People's Railway Publishing House.
- Chengdu-Kunming Railway Technical Summary Committee (1981). Chengdu-Kunming Railway (in Chinese). Vol. 2: Route, Engineering Geology, and Subgrade. Beijing: People's Railway Publishing House. OCLC 1020969862.
- Chengdu-Kunming Railway Technical Summary Committee (1979). Chengdu-Kunming Railway (in Chinese). Vol. 3: Tunnels. Beijing: People's Railway Publishing House. OCLC 1020892684.
- Chengdu-Kunming Railway Technical Summary Committee (1980). Chengdu-Kunming Railway (in Chinese). Vol. 4: Bridges. Beijing: People's Railway Publishing House.
- Chengdu-Kunming Railway Technical Summary Committee (1980). Chengdu-Kunming Railway (in Chinese). Vol. 5: Stations, Operational Equipment and Buildings. Beijing: People's Railway Publishing House.
- Chengdu-Kunming Railway Technical Summary Committee (1983). Chengdu-Kunming Railway (in Chinese). Vol. 6: Picture Album. Beijing: People's Railway Publishing House.

=== Local Chronicles ===
- Chengdu Railway Bureau History and Records Compilation Committee, ed. (1997). Chengdu Railway Bureau Chronicle (in Chinese). Vol. 1. China Railway Publishing House. ISBN 7-113-02753-9.
- Chengdu Traffic Chronicle (in Chinese). Chengdu: Sichuan People's Publishing House. 1994. ISBN 7-220-02528-9.
- Chuxiong Yi Autonomous Prefecture Local History Compilation Committee (1995). Chuxiong Yi Autonomous Prefecture Annals (in Chinese). Vol. 4. People's Publishing House. ISBN 978-7-01002-352-6.
- Editorial Committee of the "Kunming Railway Bureau Chronicle", ed. (2005). Kunming Railway Bureau Chronicle (in Chinese). China Railway Publishing House. ISBN 7-113-06315-2.
- Liangshan Yi Autonomous Prefecture Local History Compilation Committee (2000). Liangshan Yi Autonomous Prefecture Annals (in Chinese). Fangzhi Publishing House. ISBN 7-80122-565-1.
- Xichang Railway Bureau Chronicle Compilation Committee, ed. (2001). Xichang Railway Bureau Chronicle (in Chinese). OCLC 1194721241.
- Sichuan Provincial Local History Compilation Committee (2018). Sichuan Provincial Annals（1986–2005） (in Chinese). Vol. 59: Railway Chronicle. Fangzhi Publishing House. ISBN 978-7-5144-3023-3.
- Yunnan Provincial Local History Compilation Committee (2019). Yunnan Provincial Gazetteer (1978-2005) (in Chinese (China)). Vol. 60: Railway Records. Yunnan People's Publishing House. ISBN 978-7-222-18984-3.

=== Documents ===
- China Railway Corporation Transportation Bureau, ed. (2014). Railway passenger and freight transport (2014 2) (in Chinese). Beijing: China Railway Publishing House. ISBN 978-7-113-18172-7.

=== Books ===
- Hong Chenghui (2021). A Chronicle of the Chengdu-Kunming Railway (in Chinese). Vol. The Great Battle on the Chengdu-Kunming Railway. Chengdu: Sichuan Nationalities Publishing House. ISBN 978-7-5409-8395-6.
- Hu Zixiang (2021). A Century of Railways and the Chinese Road (in Chinese). Vol. Soul Forging Scroll. Chengdu: Southwest Jiaotong University Press. ISBN 978-7-5643-8404-3.
- Mei Yuncai (2009). Exploring the Mysteries of National Gifts Received by the United Nations (in Chinese). Shanghai: Shanghai University Press. ISBN 978-7-81118-430-3.
- Ministry of Railways of the People's Republic of China, ed. (2003). Decisive Battle in Southwest China (in Chinese). Beijing: China Railway Publishing House. ISBN 7-113-05109-X.
- Sichuan Provincial Archives, ed. (2020). The stories of original aspirations in the archives (in Chinese). Chengdu: Sichuan People's Publishing House. p. 122. ISBN 978-7-220-11829-6.
- Sichuan Provincial Party History Research Office, ed. (2015). A Comprehensive Discussion of the Third Front Construction (in Chinese). Chengdu: Sichuan People's Publishing House. ISBN 978-7-220-09603-7.
- Southwest Command of the Railway Corps of the Chinese People's Liberation Army, ed. (1971). Across mountains and rivers, the Railway Corps fights on the Chengdu-Kunming Railway (in Chinese).
- A Monument to History: A Complete History of the People's Republic of China (in Chinese). Vol. 5: Economy. Beijing: Central Party Literature Publishing House. 2005. ISBN 7-5073-1612-2.

=== Journals ===
- Yan Biyu; Wang Maojing (2005). "The Chengdu–Kunming railway, which passes through a "geological museum"". Journal of Railway Engineering (in Chinese) (z1). doi:10.3969/j.issn.1006-2106.2005.z1.027. ISSN 1006-2106.
- 日本鉄道技術協会 (1978). "Impressions of China's Railways, Roads, and Friendly Visits". JREA (in Japanese). 21 (12). Japan Railway Technology Association: 12331–12335. doi:10.11501/3255997.
