= 1850 =

1850 in various calendars
- Gregorian calendar: 1850; MDCCCL
- Ab urbe condita: 2603
- Armenian calendar: 1299; ԹՎ ՌՄՂԹ
- Assyrian calendar: 6600
- Baháʼí calendar: 6–7
- Balinese saka calendar: 1771–1772
- Bengali calendar: 1256–1257
- Berber calendar: 2800
- British Regnal year: 13 Vict. 1 – 14 Vict. 1
- Buddhist calendar: 2394
- Burmese calendar: 1212
- Byzantine calendar: 7358–7359
- Chinese calendar: 己酉年 (Earth Rooster); 4547 or 4340 — to — 庚戌年 (Metal Dog); 4548 or 4341
- Coptic calendar: 1566–1567
- Discordian calendar: 3016
- Ethiopian calendar: 1842–1843
- Hebrew calendar: 5610–5611
- Hindu calendars
- Vikram Samvat: 1906–1907
- Shaka Samvat: 1771–1772
- Kali Yuga: 4950–4951
- Holocene calendar: 11850
- Igbo calendar: 850–851
- Iranian calendar: 1228–1229
- Islamic calendar: 1266–1267
- Japanese calendar: Kaei 3 (嘉永３年)
- Javanese calendar: 1778–1779
- Julian calendar: Gregorian minus 12 days
- Korean calendar: 4183
- Minguo calendar: 62 before ROC 民前62年
- Nanakshahi calendar: 382
- Thai solar calendar: 2392–2393
- Tibetan calendar: ས་མོ་བྱ་ལོ་ (female Earth-Bird); 1976 or 1595 or 823 — to — ལྕགས་ཕོ་ཁྱི་ལོ་ (male Iron-Dog); 1977 or 1596 or 824

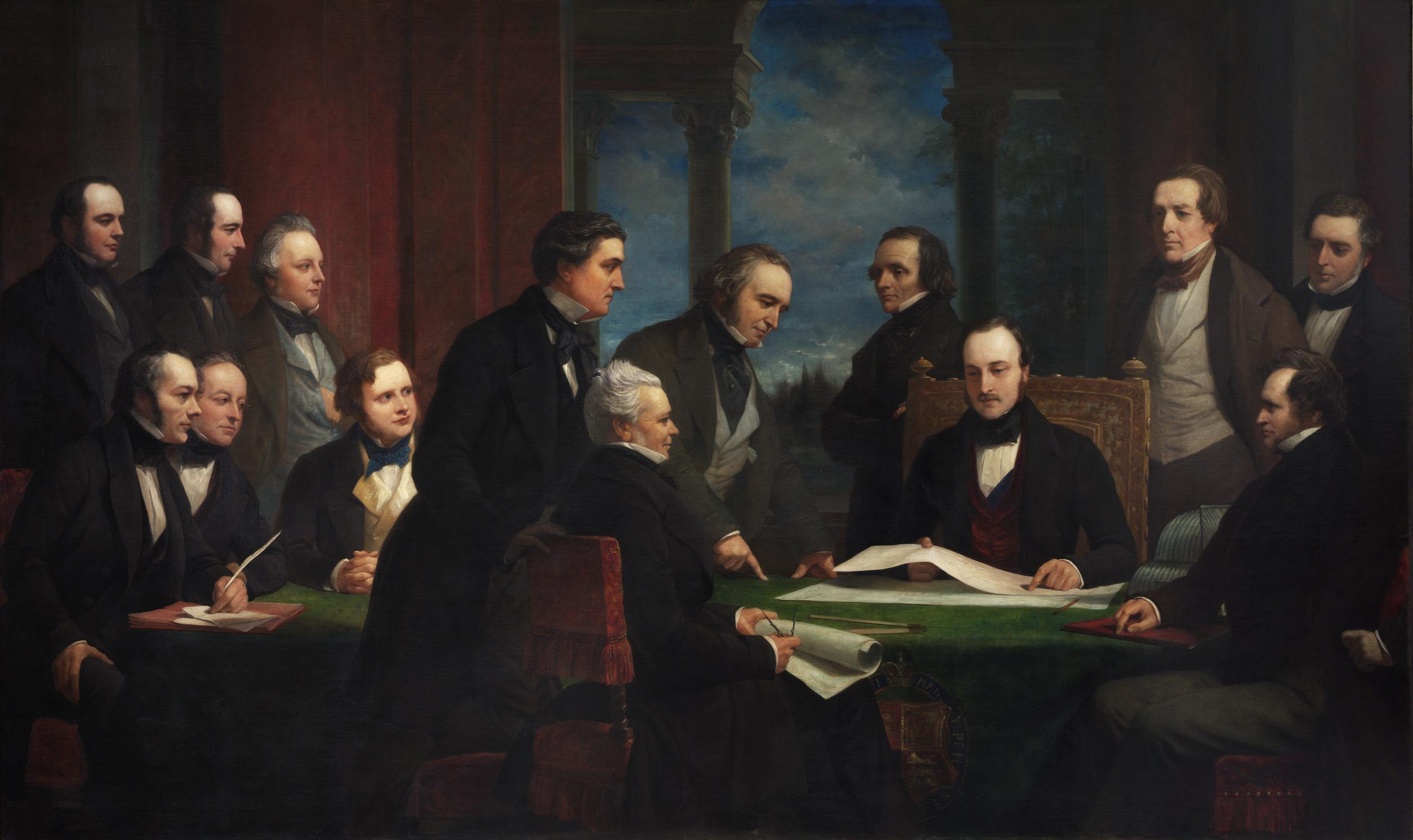
The Royal Commission for the Great Exhibition is established in the U.K.

1850 (MDCCCL) was a common year starting on Tuesday of the Gregorian calendar and a common year starting on Sunday of the Julian calendar, the 1850th year of the Common Era (CE) and Anno Domini (AD) designations, the 850th year of the 2nd millennium, the 50th year of the 19th century, and the 1st year of the 1850s decade. As of the start of 1850, the Gregorian calendar was 12 days ahead of the Julian calendar, which remained in localized use until 1923.

== Events ==
=== January–March ===
- January 29 – Henry Clay introduces the Compromise of 1850 to the United States Congress.
- January 31 – The University of Rochester is founded in Rochester, New York.
- January – Sacramento floods.
- February 1 - Abraham Lincoln’s second son, Edward Baker Lincoln, died at the age of three after 52 days for struggling with tuberculosis (consumption) before his fourth birthday in Springfield, Illinois.
- February 28 – The University of Utah opens in Salt Lake City.
- March 5 – The Britannia Bridge opens over the Menai Strait in Wales.
- March 7 – United States Senator Daniel Webster gives his "Seventh of March" speech, in which he endorses the Compromise of 1850, in order to prevent a possible civil war.
- March 16 – Nathaniel Hawthorne's historical novel The Scarlet Letter is published in Boston, Massachusetts.
- March 19 – American Express is founded by Henry Wells and William Fargo.
- March 31 – The paddle steamer RMS Royal Adelaide, bound from Cork to London, is wrecked in the English Channel with the loss of all 250 on board.

=== April–June ===
- April 4 – Los Angeles is incorporated as a city in California.
- April 15
  - San Francisco is incorporated as a city in California.
  - Angers Bridge collapses in France killing around 226 of the soldiers crossing it at the time.
- April 19 – The Clayton–Bulwer Treaty is signed by the United States and Great Britain, allowing both countries to share Nicaragua, and not claim complete control over the proposed Nicaragua Canal.
- April
  - Pope Pius IX returns from exile to Rome.
  - Stephen Foster's parlor ballad "Ah! May the Red Rose Live Alway" is published in the United States.
- May 15 – The Bloody Island Massacre takes place at Clear Lake in northern California.
- May 23 – The USS Advance puts to sea from New York to search for Franklin's lost expedition in the Arctic.
- May 25 – The hippopotamus Obaysch arrives at London Zoo from Egypt, the first seen in Europe since Roman times.
- June 1
  - The transportation of British convicts to Western Australia begins, as the transportation of British convicts to other parts of Australia is phased out, when the ship Scindian arrives in Fremantle, with 75 male prisoners.
  - The postage stamp issues of Austria begin with a series of imperforate typographed stamps, featuring the coat of arms.
  - The 1850 United States census shows that 11.2% of the population classed as "Negro" are of mixed race.
- June 3 – Kansas City, Missouri, is incorporated by Jackson County, Missouri, as the Town of Kansas (traditional date of its founding).
- June 3 – the Cayuse Five (five members of the Cayuse people) were executed for murder following the Whitman massacre (an attack on a mission settlement near present-day Walla Walla, Washington)

=== July–September ===
- July – Taiping Rebellion: Hong Xiuquan orders the general mobilisation of rebel forces in China.
- July 1 – St. Mary School for Boys (the future University of Dayton) opens its doors in Dayton, Ohio.
- July 2 – Twice-served former British Prime Minister Sir Robert Peel dies following a fall from his horse at Constitution Hill, London.
- July 9
  - The Báb (Mírzá 'Alí-Muhammad) is executed by a firing squad in Tabriz, Persia, for claiming to be a prophet.
  - Vice President Millard Fillmore becomes the 13th president of the United States upon the death of President Zachary Taylor.
- July 17 – Vega becomes the first star (other than the Sun) to be photographed.
- July 19 – The ship Elizabeth, an American merchant freighter carrying cargo that included mostly marble from Carrara, slammed into a sandbar less than 100 yards from Fire Island, New York, drowning Margaret Fuller, her husband Ossoli, and their young son Angelino.
- August 28 – Richard Wagner's romantic opera Lohengrin (including the Bridal Chorus) premieres under the direction of Franz Liszt, in Weimar.
- September 4 – The Eusébio de Queirós Law is passed in the Brazilian Empire to abolish the international slave trade.
- September 9
  - California is admitted as the 31st U.S. state.
  - The New Mexico Territory is organized by order of the United States Congress.
  - The Utah Territory is established.
- September 12 – The 1850 Xichang earthquake (7.9) shakes the Chinese province of Sichuan killing more than 20,000 people.
- September 13 – Piz Bernina, the highest summit of the eastern Alps, is first ascended.
- September 18
  - The Fugitive Slave Law is passed by the United States Congress.
  - Harriet Tubman becomes an official conductor of the Underground Railroad.
- September 29 – Papal bull Universalis Ecclesiae: The Catholic hierarchy is re-established in England and Wales, by Pope Pius IX and future Pope Pius X.

=== October–December ===
- October 1 – The University of Sydney (the oldest in Australia) is founded.
- October 19 – The Phi Kappa Sigma international fraternity is founded, at the University of Pennsylvania.
- October 28 – Delegate Edward Ralph May delivers a speech on behalf of African-American suffrage, to the Indiana Constitutional Convention.
- November
  - Taiping Rebellion: The first clashes of the Taiping Rebellion occur, between the Imperialist militia and the Heavenly Army.
  - Undergraduates at Exeter College, Oxford arrange a "foot grind" (a cross-country steeplechase), the first organised university athletic event.
- November 29 – The treaty known as the Punctation of Olmütz is signed in Olomouc. It means diplomatic capitulation of Prussia to the Austrian Empire, which takes over the leadership of the German Confederation.
- December 16 – Members of the Canterbury Association, the first settlers bound for Christchurch, arrive from England at the port of Lyttelton, New Zealand, aboard the Charlotte Jane and Randolph.

=== Date unknown ===
- Dost Mohammad Barakzai, emir of Afghanistan, captures Balkh.
- The first portion of the Oudh Bequest is transferred from Oudh State in the British Raj to the Shia Islam holy cities of Najaf and Karbala, in Persia.
- The American system of watch manufacturing is started in Roxbury, Massachusetts, by the Waltham Watch Company.
- Bingley Hall, the world's first purpose-built exhibition hall, opens in Birmingham, England.
- Allan Pinkerton forms the North-Western Police Agency, later the Pinkerton National Detective Agency, in the United States.
- The temperance organisation, International Organisation of Good Templars, is established in Utica, New York, as the order of the Knights of Jericho.
- Mayer Lehman arrives from Germany to join his siblings in Lehman Brothers dry-goods business (predecessor of the bank) in Montgomery, Alabama.
- One of the original segments of the historic Pacific Highway (United States) in Washington (state) in Clark and Cowlitz counties is established.
- German physicist Rudolf Clausius publishes his paper on the mechanical theory of heat ("On the Moving Force of Heat") which first states the basic ideas of the second law of thermodynamics.
- The city of Manchester, England, reaches 400,000 inhabitants.
- From this year until 1880, 144,000 East Indian laborers go to Trinidad and 39,000 to Jamaica.
- Ongoing – Great Famine (Ireland) subsides.

== Births ==
=== January–February ===
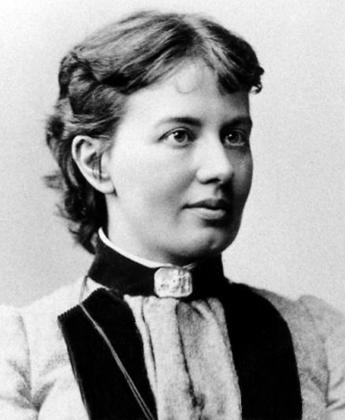
Sofia Kovalevskaya

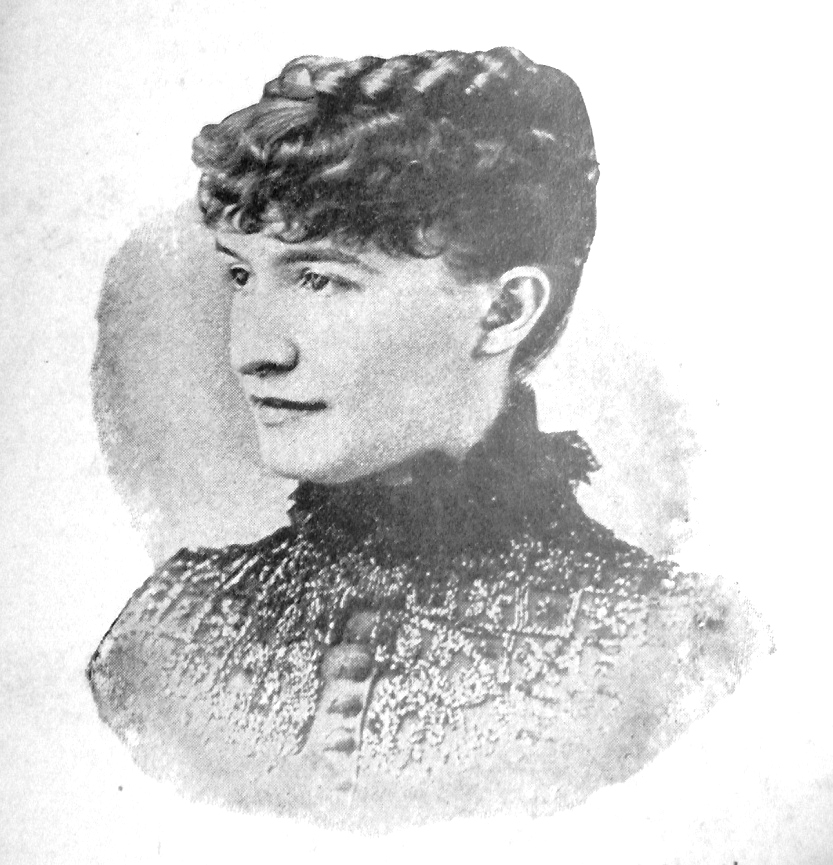
Mary Noailles Murfree

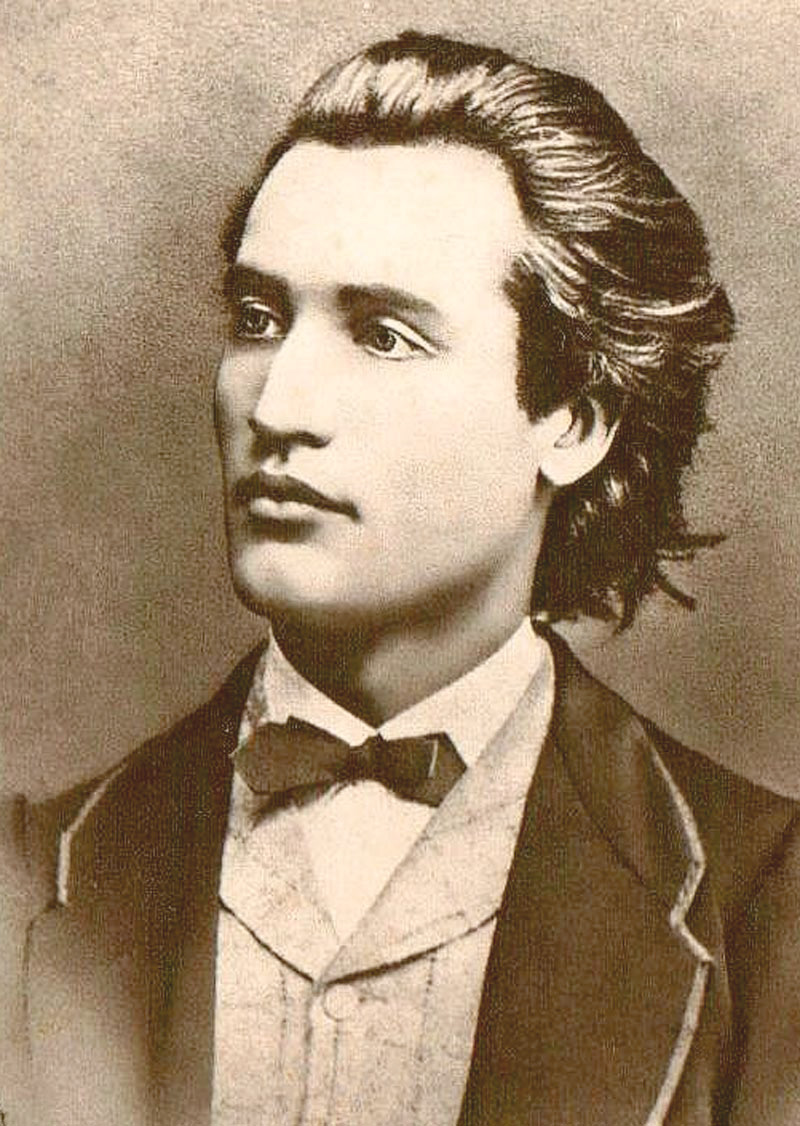
Mihai Eminescu

- January 1 – John Barclay Armstrong, Texas Ranger, U.S. Marshal (d. 1913)
- January 6
  - Eduard Bernstein, German social democratic theoretician, politician (d. 1932)
  - Xaver Scharwenka, Polish-German composer (d. 1924)
- January 10 – John Wellborn Root, American architect (d. 1891)
- January 11 – Philipp von Ferrary, Italian stamp collector (d. 1917)
- January 14 – Pierre Loti, French novelist (d. 1923)
- January 15
  - Mihai Eminescu, Romanian romantic poet (d. 1889)
  - Sofia Kovalevskaya, Russian mathematician (d. 1891)
- January 18 – Seth Low, American educator (d. 1916)
- January 19 – Augustine Birrell, English author, politician (d. 1933)
- January 24 – Hermann Ebbinghaus, German psychologist (d. 1909)
- January 27
  - John Collier, British writer and painter (d. 1934)
  - Edward Smith, British captain of the Titanic (d. 1912)
  - Samuel Gompers, American labor union leader (d. 1924)
- January 29
  - Sir Ebenezer Howard, British urban planner (d. 1928)
  - Lawrence Hargrave, Australian engineer (d. 1915)
- January 30 – Victor-Constant Michel, French general (d. 1937)
- February 8 – Kate Chopin, American writer (d. 1904)
- February 10 – Alexander von Linsingen, German general (d. 1935)
- February 12 – William Morris Davis, American geographer (d. 1934)
- February 14 – Kiyoura Keigo, Prime Minister of Japan (d. 1942)
- February 15 – Albert B. Cummins, American lawyer and politician (d. 1926)
- February 17 – Alf Morgans, 4th Premier of Western Australia (d. 1933)
- February 18 – Sir George Henschel, English musician (d. 1934)
- February 23 – César Ritz, Swiss hotelier (d. 1918)
- February 27 – Henry E. Huntington, American railroad pioneer, art collector (d. 1927)

=== March–April ===
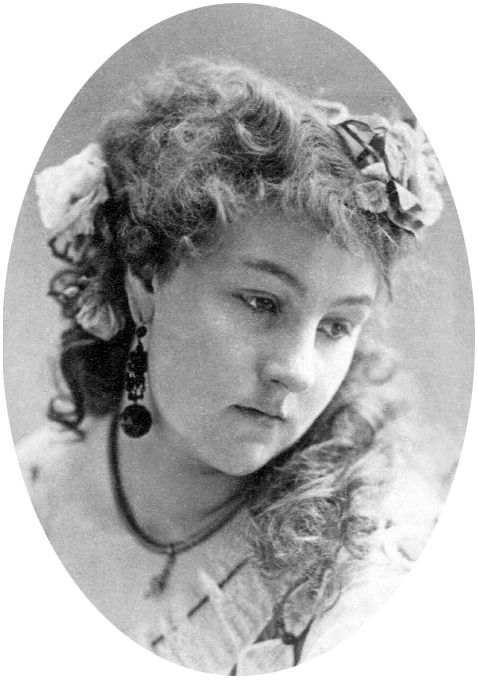
Fanny Davenport

- March 6 – Sagen Ishizuka, Japanese physician, dietitian (d. 1909)
- March 7
  - Tomáš Garrigue Masaryk, President of Czechoslovakia (d. 1937)
  - Champ Clark, American politician (d. 1921)
- March 9
  - Josias von Heeringen, German general (d. 1926)
  - Sir Hamo Thornycroft, British sculptor (d. 1925)
- March 10 – Spencer Gore, British tennis player, cricketer (d. 1906)
- March 13 – Sir Hugh John Macdonald, premier of Manitoba (d. 1929)
- March 26 – Edward Bellamy, American author (d. 1898)
- March 31 – Charles Doolittle Walcott, American invertebrate paleontologist (d. 1927)

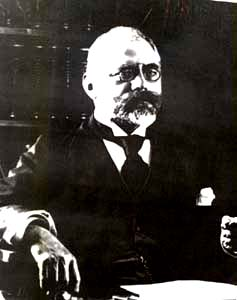
Hans von Pechmann

- April 1 – Hans von Pechmann, German chemist (d. 1902)
- April 8 – Kawamura Kageaki, Japanese field marshal (d. 1926)
- April 9 – Sir Julius Wernher, German-born British businessman, art collector (d. 1912)
- April 10
  - Fanny Davenport, English-born American actress (d. 1898)
  - Mary Emilie Holmes, American geologist, educator (d. 1906)
- April 12 – Nikolai Golitsyn, Prime Minister of Russia (d. 1925)
- April 13 – Arthur Matthew Weld Downing, British astronomer (d. 1917)
- April 15
  - Edmund Peck, Canadian missionary (d. 1924)
  - William Thomas Pipes, Canadian politician, 6th Premier of Nova Scotia (d. 1909)
- April 18 – Jo Labadie, American labor organizer (d. 1933)
- April 20 – Daniel Chester French, American sculptor (d. 1931)
- April 23 – Agda Montelius, Swedish feminist (d. 1920)
- April 26
  - Harry Bates, English sculptor (d. 1899)
  - James Drake, Australian politician (d. 1941)
- April 27 – Hans Hartwig von Beseler, German general (d. 1921)

=== May–June ===
- May 1 – Prince Arthur, Duke of Connaught and Strathearn, British prince and Governor General of Canada (d. 1942)
- May 3 – Johnny Ringo, American cowboy (d. 1882)
- May 7 – Anton Seidl, Hungarian conductor (d. 1898)
- May 8 – Ross Barnes, American baseball player (d. 1915)
- May 10 – Sir Thomas Lipton, Scottish merchant, yachtsman (d. 1931)
- May 12
  - Henry Cabot Lodge, American statesman (d. 1924)
  - Sir Frederick Holder, 19th Premier of South Australia (d. 1909)
- May 18 – Oliver Heaviside, British engineer (d. 1925)
- May 21
  - Giuseppe Mercalli, Italian volcanologist (d. 1914)
  - Gustav Lindenthal, Czech civil engineer, bridge designer (d. 1935)
- May 27 – Thomas Neill Cream, Scottish-Canadian serial killer (d. 1892)
- May 28 – Frederic William Maitland, English jurist and historian (d. 1906)
- May 30 – Frederick Dent Grant, U.S. soldier, statesman (d. 1912)
- June 2
  - Jesse Boot, 1st Baron Trent, British businessman (d. 1931)
  - Sir Edward Albert Sharpey-Schafer, English physiologist, pioneer in endocrinology (d. 1935)
- June 5 – Pat Garrett, American bartender and sheriff (d. 1908)

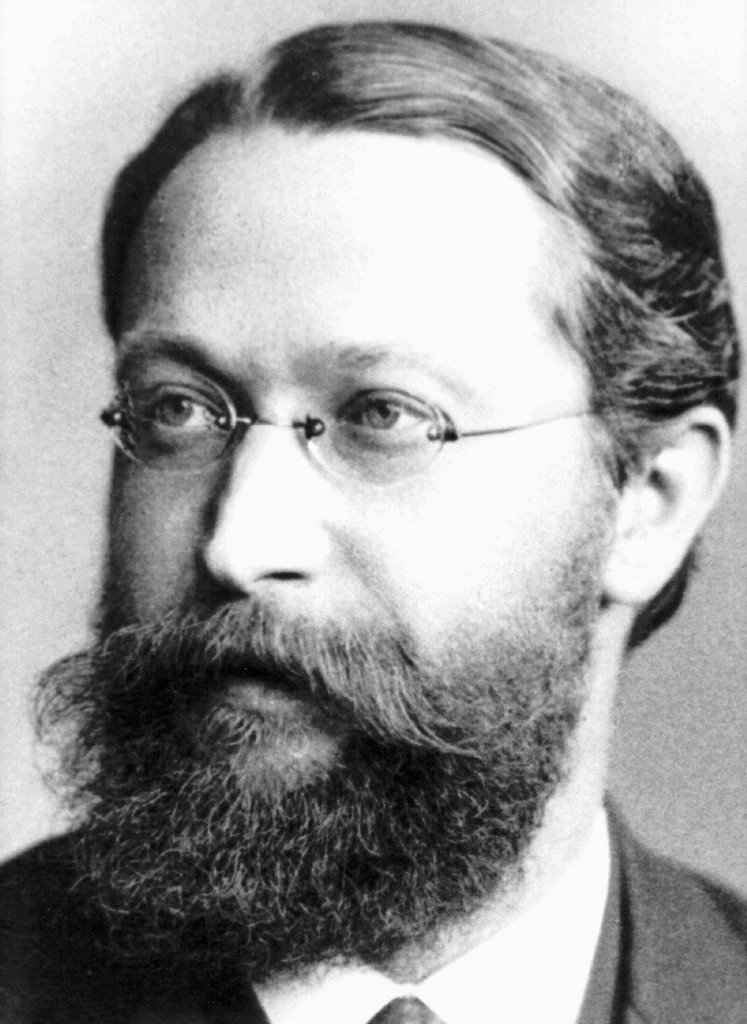
Karl Ferdinand Braun

- June 6 – Karl Ferdinand Braun, German physicist, Nobel Prize laureate (d. 1918)
- June 15 – Charles Hazelius Sternberg, American fossil collector, amateur paleontologist (d. 1943)
- June 21 – Daniel Carter Beard, American scouting pioneer (d. 1941)
- June 22 – Ignaz Goldziher, Hungarian orientalist (d. 1921)
- June 24 – Horatio Kitchener, 1st Earl Kitchener, British field marshal, statesman (d. 1916)
- June 27
  - Lafcadio Hearn, Greco-Japanese author (d. 1904)
  - Ivan Vazov, Bulgarian poet (d. 1921)
- June 30 – Paul von Plehwe, Russian general (d. 1916)

=== July–August ===
- July 2 – Robert Ridgway, American ornithologist (d. 1929)
- July 9 – George F. Durand, Canadian architect (d. 1889)
- July 11 – Annie Armstrong, American missionary leader (d. 1938)
- July 15 – Frances Xavier Cabrini, American saint (d. 1917)
- July 31
  - Robert Love Taylor, American congressman, senator and Governor from Tennessee (d. 1912)
  - Robert Planquette, French composer of stage musicals (d. 1903)
- August 5 – Guy de Maupassant, French writer (d. 1893)
- August 9 – Johann Büttikofer, Swiss zoologist (d. 1927)
- August 10 – Ella M. S. Marble, American physician (d. 1929)
- August 25 – Charles Richet, French physiologist, Nobel Prize winner (d. 1935)
- August 30
  - Marcelo H. del Pilar, Filipino writer, journalist (d. 1896)
  - Bernardo Reyes, Mexican general (d. 1913)

=== September–October ===
- September 4 – Luigi Cadorna, Italian general (d. 1928)
- September 5 – Eugen Goldstein, German physicist (d. 1930)
- September 8 – Paul Gerson Unna, German dermatologist (d. 1929)
- September 20 – Ōshima Yoshimasa, Japanese general (d. 1926)

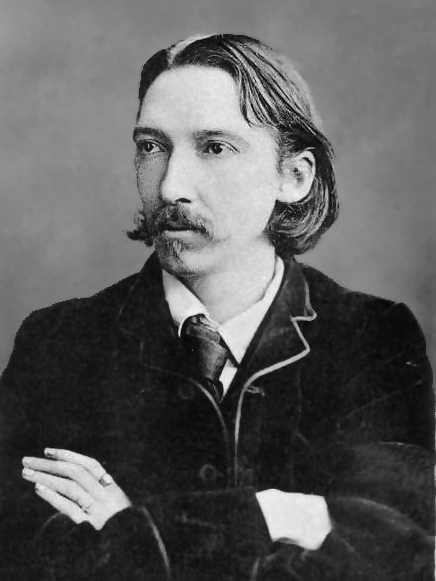
Robert Louis Stevenson

- October 1
  - David R. Francis, American politician (d. 1927)
  - Agustín de Luque y Coca, Spanish general and politician (d. 1937)
- October 8 – Henry Louis Le Châtelier, French chemist (d. 1936)
- October 18 – Ferdinand von Quast, German general (d. 1939)

=== November–December ===
- November 1 – Elisabeth Dmitrieff, Russian revolutionary and feminist activist (d. 1916–18?)
- November 2 – Antonio Jacobsen, Danish-born American maritime artist (d. 1921)
- November 11 – Silva Porto, Portuguese painter (d. 1893)
- November 13 – Robert Louis Stevenson, Scottish writer (d. 1894)
- November 15 – Victor Laloux, French architect (d. 1937)
- November 24 – László Lukács, 17th Prime Minister of Hungary (d. 1932)
- December 22 – Victoriano Huerta, 35th President of Mexico (d. 1916)
- December 26 – Walter Dinnie, British and New Zealand police officer (d. 1923)

=== Date unknown ===
- Abdul Wahid Bengali, Muslim theologian and teacher (d. 1905)
- Mikael of Wollo, Ethiopian army commander and Ras of Wollo (d. 1918)

== Deaths ==
=== January–March ===
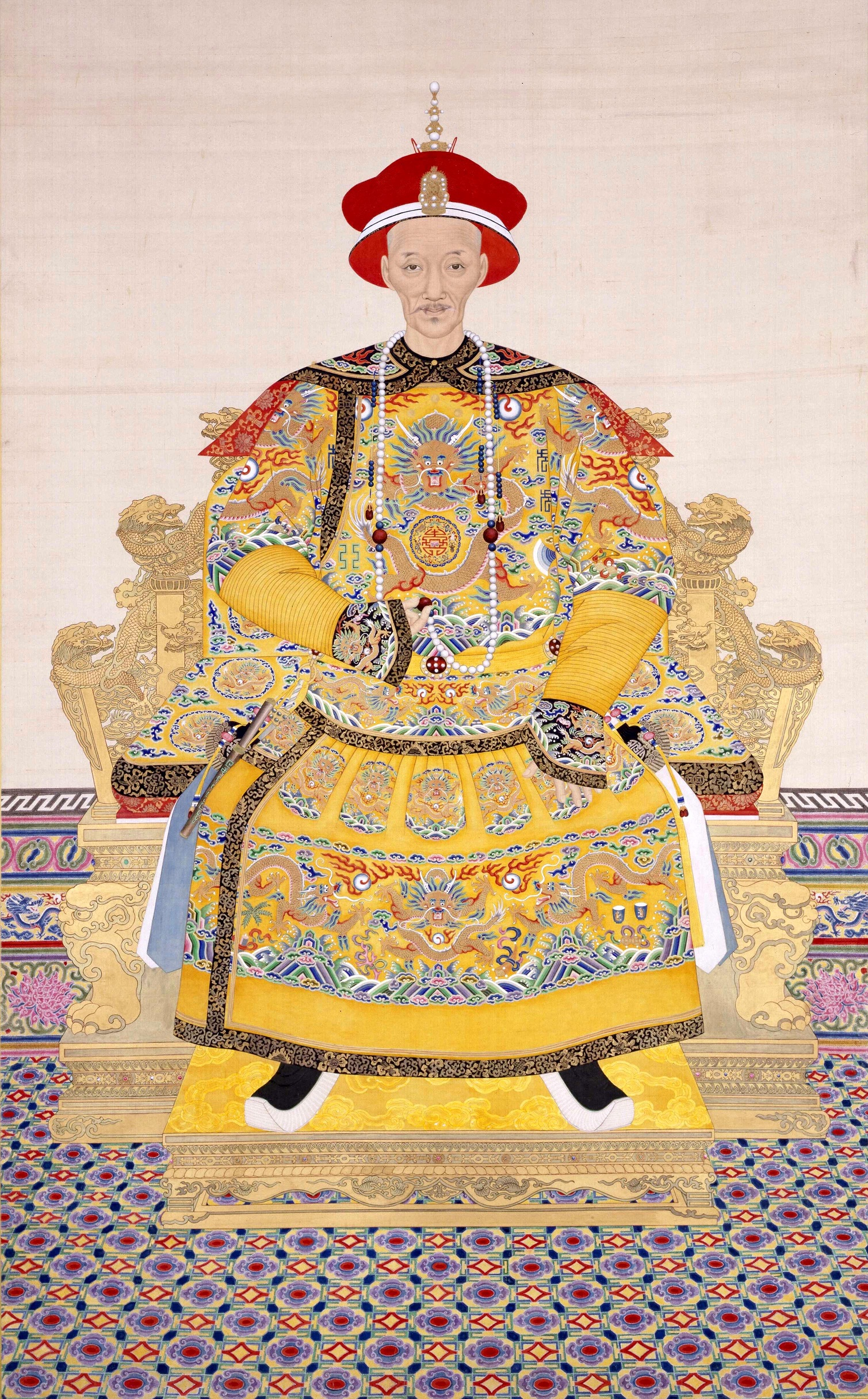
Daoguang Emperor

- January 2 – Manuel de la Peña y Peña, interim President of Mexico (b. 1789)
- January 10 – Pedro Afonso, Prince Imperial of Brazil (b. 1848)
- January 17 – Elizabeth Simcoe, English-born wife of John Graves Simcoe (b. 1762)
- January 20 – Adam Gottlob Oehlenschläger, Danish poet, playwright (b. 1779)
- January 22
  - William Joseph Chaminade, French Catholic priest (b. 1761)
  - Saint Vincent Pallotti, Italian missionary (b. 1795)
- January 26 – Francis Jeffrey, Scottish judge, literary critic (b. 1773)
- January 27
  - Philipp Röth, German composer (b. 1779)
  - Johann Gottfried Schadow, German sculptor (b. 1764)
- February 4 – Daniel Turner, officer in the United States Navy (b. 1794)
- February 20 – Valentín Canalizo, acting president of Mexico (b. 1794)
- February 23 – Matthew Whitworth-Aylmer, 5th Baron Aylmer, British military officer, colonial administrator (b. 1775)
- February 24 – Tan Tock Seng, Singaporean businessman, philanthropist (b. 1798)
- February 25 – Daoguang Emperor of the Qing dynasty of China (b. 1782)
- February 27 – Samuel Adams, Democratic Governor of the State of Arkansas (b. 1805)
- February 28 – Edward Bickersteth, English evangelical divine (b. 1786)
- March 3 – Oliver Cowdery, American religious leader (b. 1806)
- March 7 – Sir Hercules Robert Pakenham, British army general (b. 1781)
- March 13
  - Juan Martín de Pueyrredón y O'Dogan, Argentine general, politician (b. 1776)
  - Owen Stanley, British naval officer, explorer of New Guinea (b. 1811)
- March 26 – Samuel Turell Armstrong, American political figure (b. 1784)
- March 27 – Wilhelm Beer, German banker, astronomer (b. 1797)
- March 28 – Gerard Brandon, Governor of Mississippi (b. 1788)
- March 31 – John C. Calhoun, 7th Vice President of the United States (b. 1782)

=== April–June ===
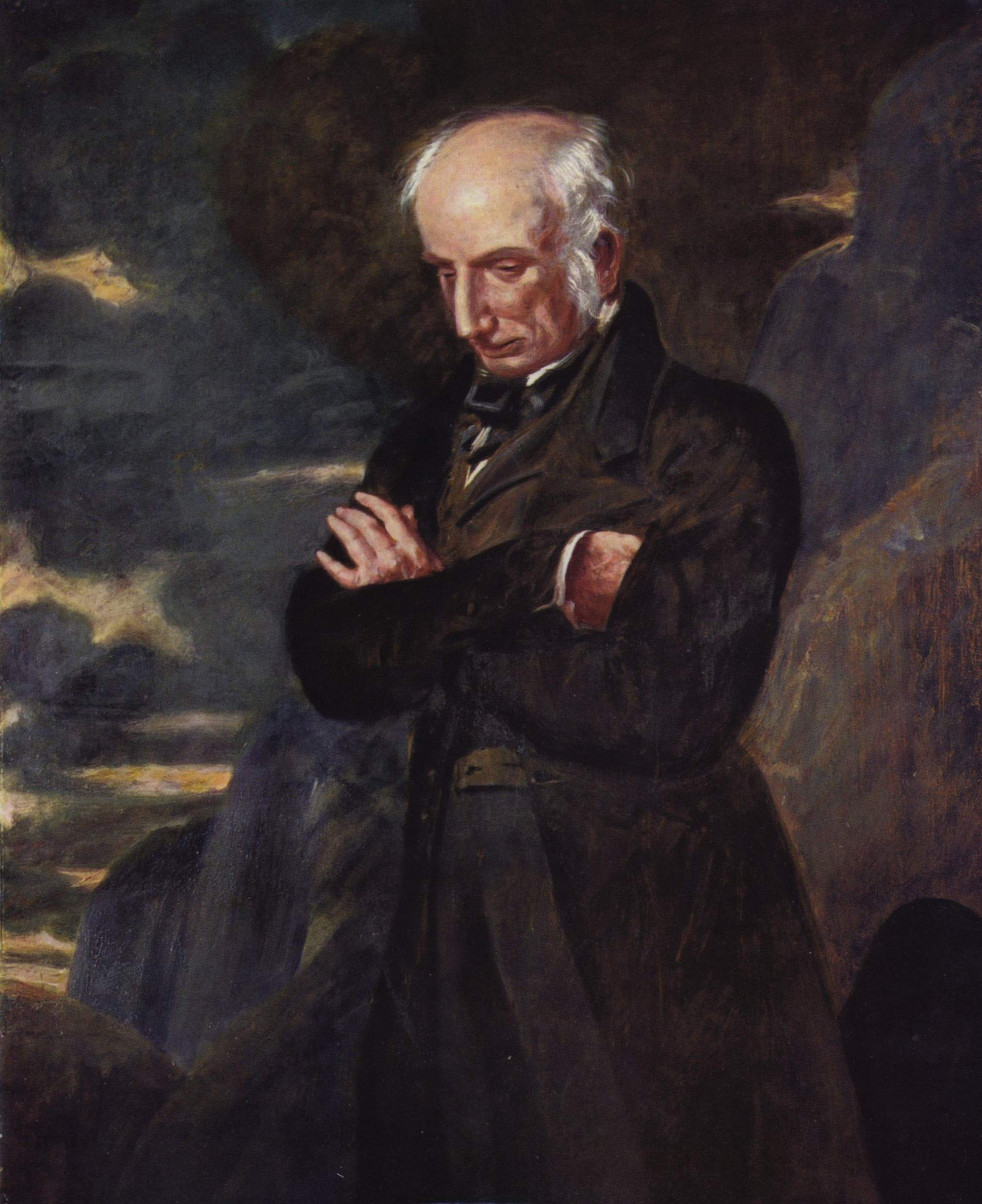
William Wordsworth

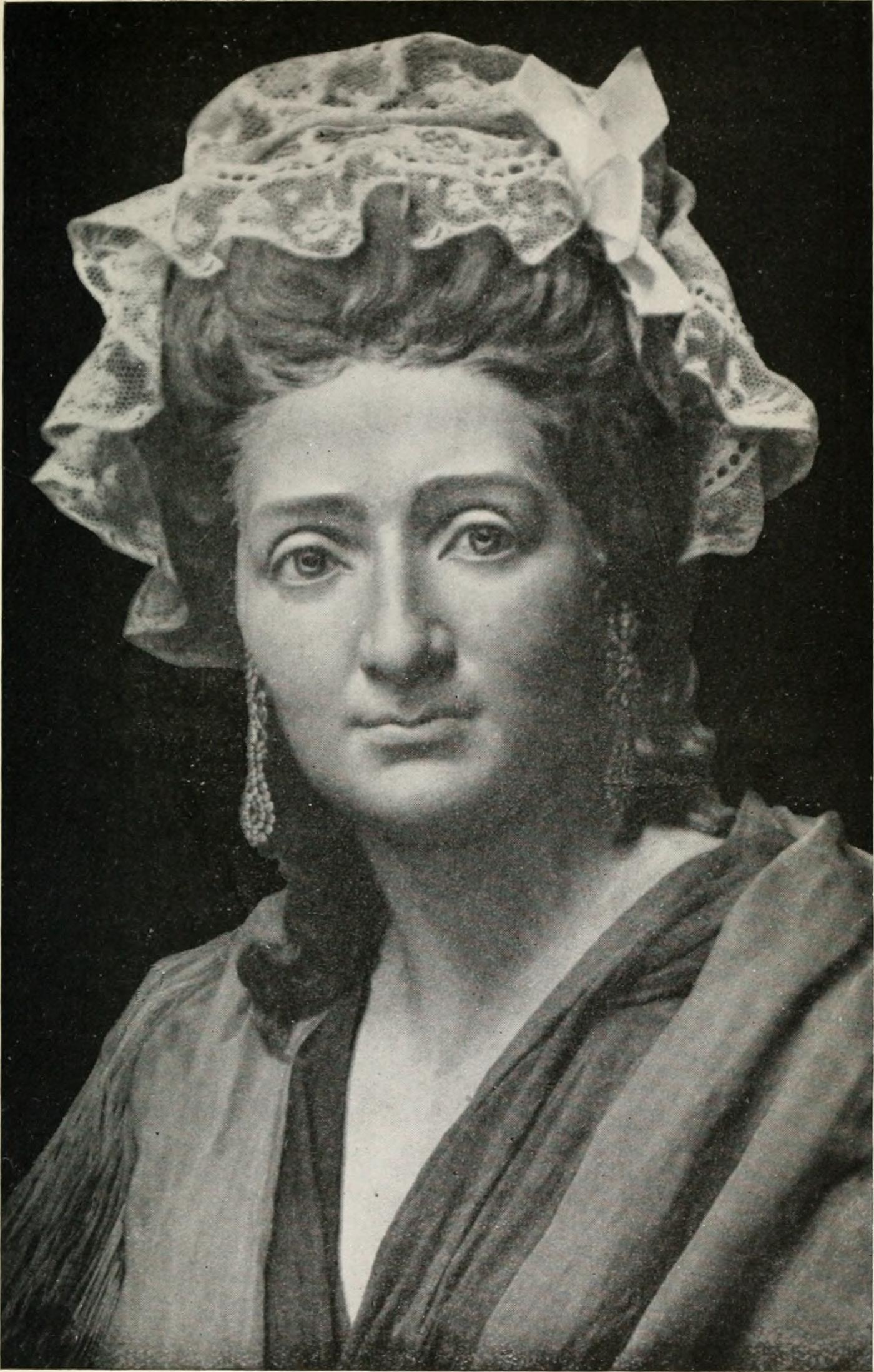
Marie Tussaud

- April 7 – William Lisle Bowles, English poet, critic (b. 1762)
- April 9 – William Prout, English chemist, physician (b. 1785)
- April 11 – Raja Nara Singh, regent of Manipur (b. 1792)
- April 12 – Adoniram Judson, American Baptist missionary (b. 1788)
- April 16 – Marie Tussaud, French wax sculptor (b. 1761)
- April 17 – Jan Krukowiecki, Polish general (b. 1772)
- April 22 – Friedrich Robert Faehlmann, Estonian philologist, physician (b. 1798)
- April 23 – William Wordsworth, English poet (b. 1770)
- April 24 – John Norvell, American newspaperman, senator (b. 1789)
- May 1 – Henri Marie Ducrotay de Blainville, French zoologist, anatomist (b. 1777)
- May 2 – Joseph Plumb Martin, American Revolutionary soldier, narrative author (b. 1760)
- May 10 – Joseph Louis Gay-Lussac, French chemist, physicist (b. 1778)
- May 12 – Frances Sargent Osgood, U.S. poet (b. 1811)
- May 21 – Christoph Friedrich von Ammon, German theological writer, preacher (b. 1766)
- May 24
  - Jane Porter, English novelist (b. 1776)
  - Michał Gedeon Radziwiłł, Polish noble (b. 1778)
- May 31 – Giuseppe Giusti, Tuscan satirical poet (b. 1809)
- June 9 – John Green Crosse, English surgeon (b. 1790)
- June 16 – William Lawson, British explorer of New South Wales (b. 1774)
- June 30 – Richard Dillingham, American Quaker teacher (b. 1823)

=== July–September ===
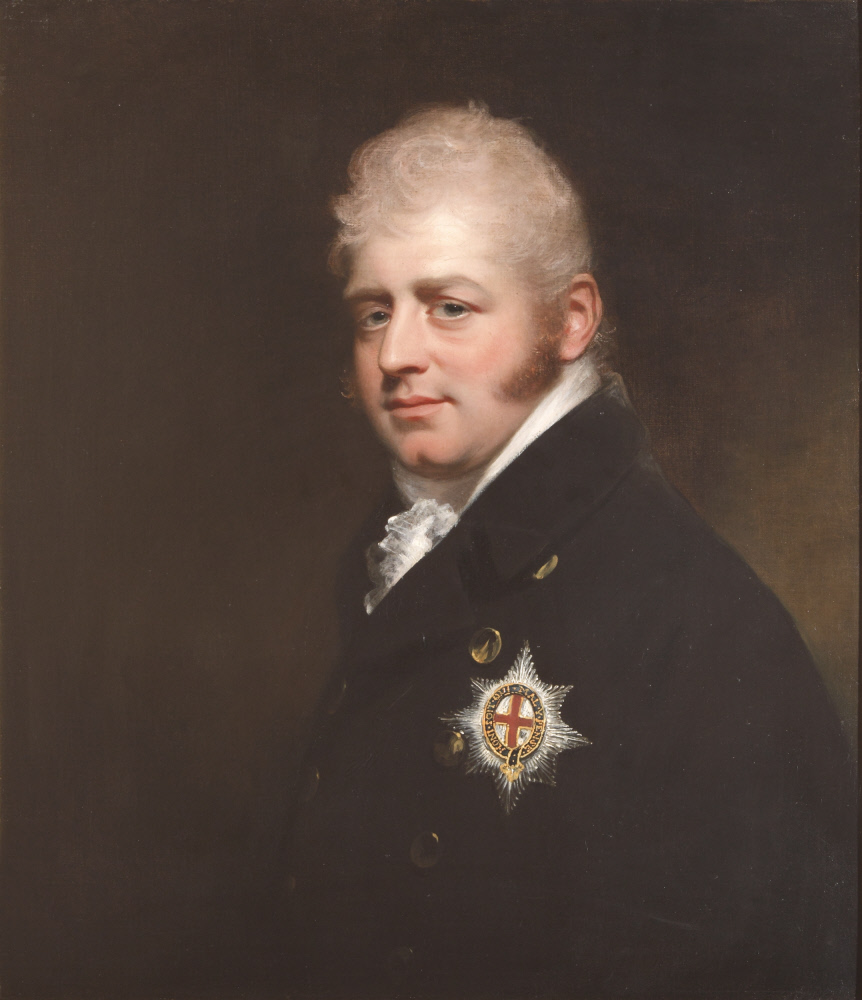
Prince Adolphus, Duke of Cambridge

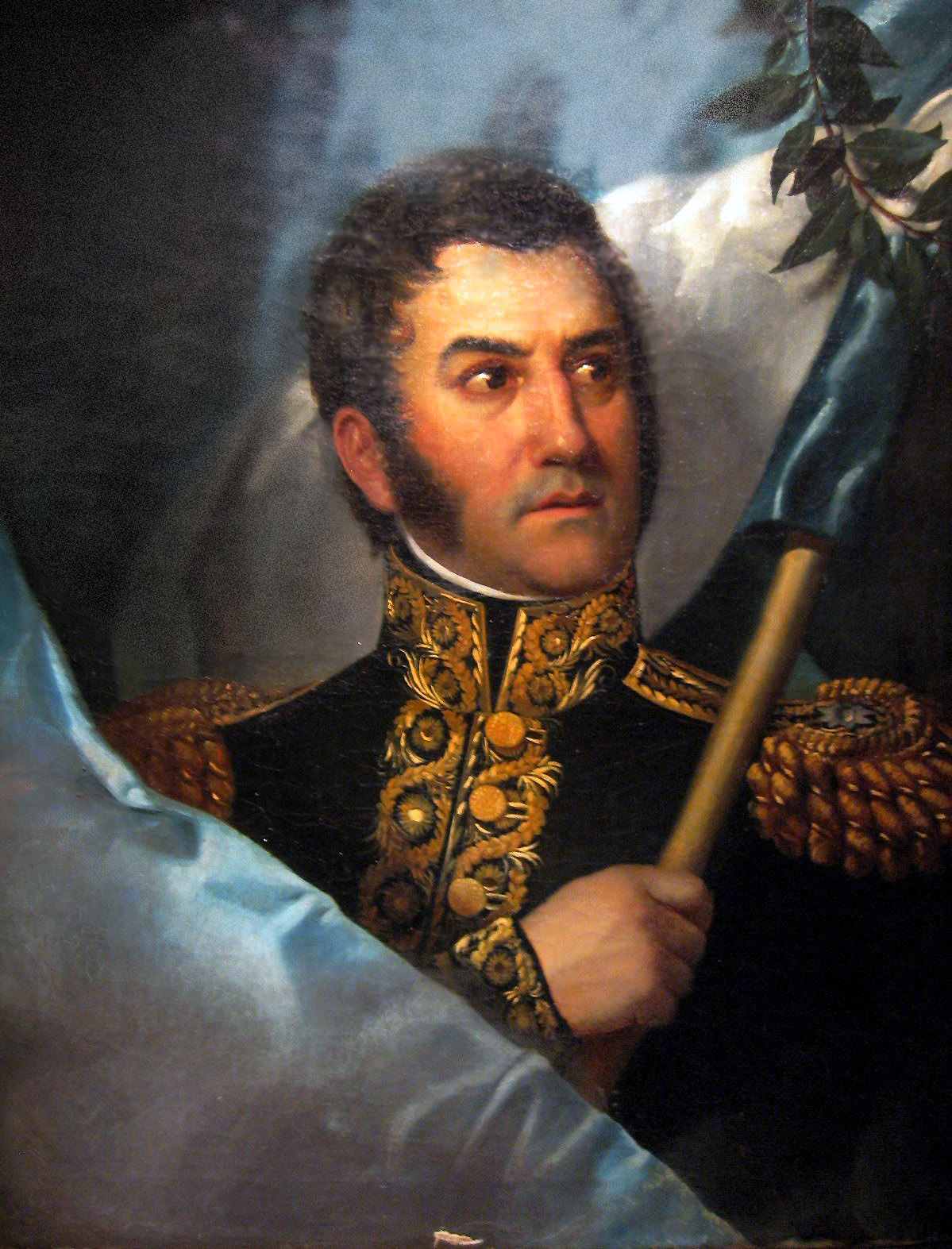
José de San Martín

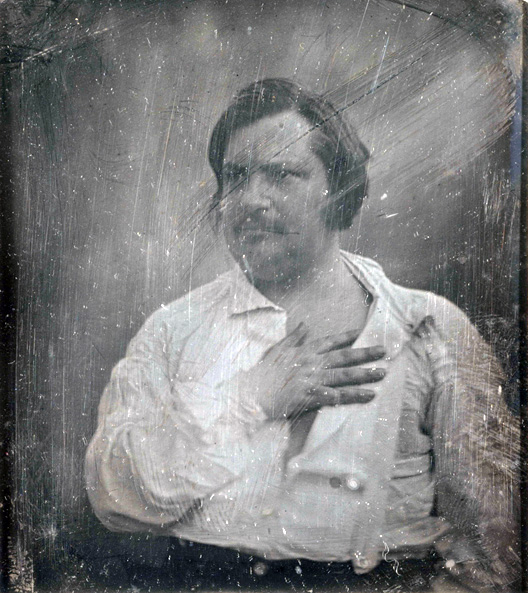
Honoré de Balzac

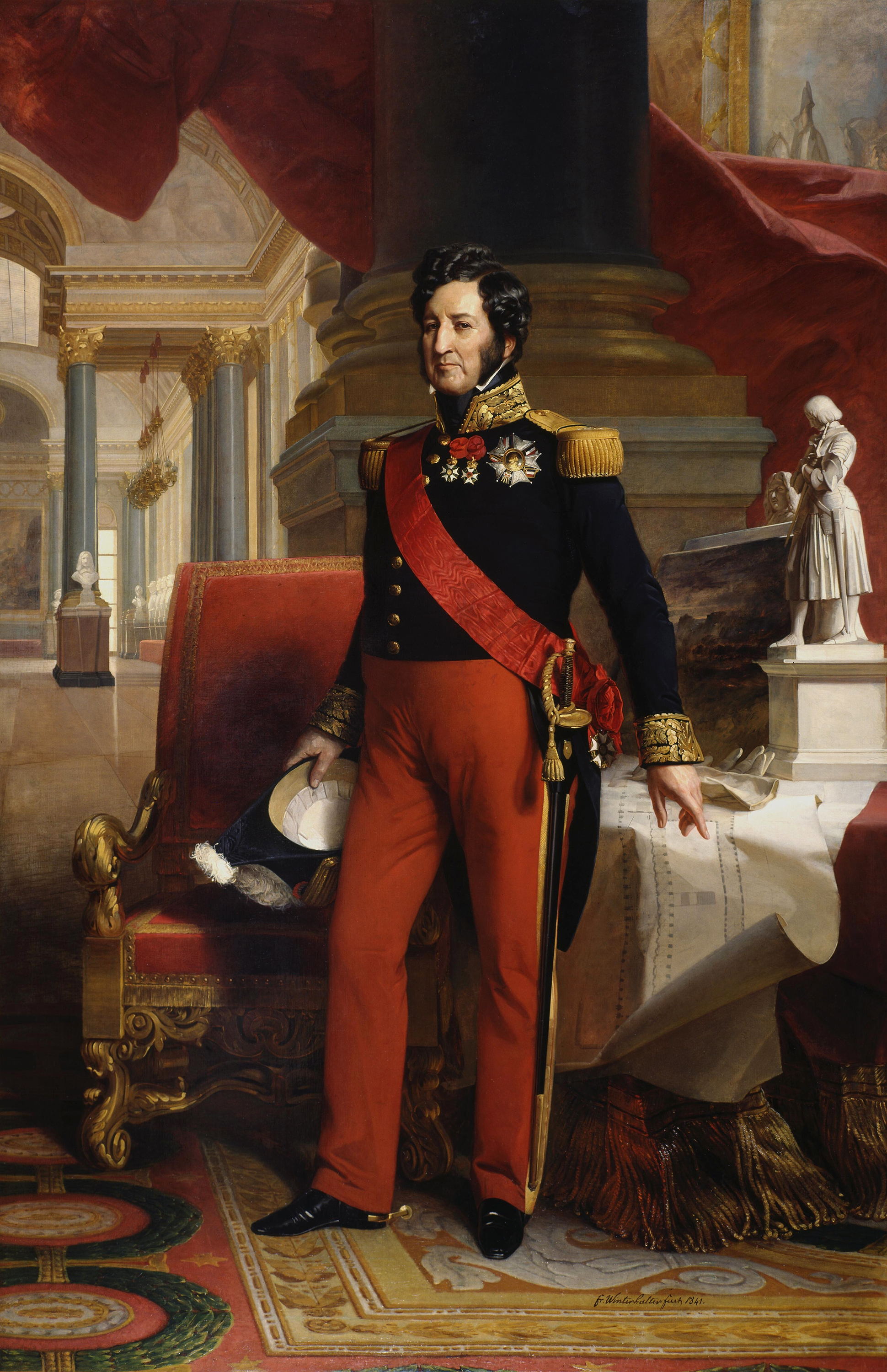
Louis Philippe I

- July 2 – Robert Peel, Prime Minister of the United Kingdom (b. 1788)
- July 4 – William Kirby, English entomologist (b. 1759)
- July 7 – Timothy Hackworth, British steam locomotive engineer (b. 1786)
- July 8 – Prince Adolphus of the United Kingdom, 1st Duke of Cambridge (b. 1774)
- July 9
  - The Báb, Persian founder of the Bábí Faith (executed by a firing squad) (b. 1819)
  - Zachary Taylor, 65, 12th President of the United States (b. 1784)
  - Jean-Pierre Boyer, President of Haiti (b. 1776)
- July 12 – Robert Stevenson, Scottish lighthouse engineer (b. 1772)
- July 14 – August Neander, German theologian, church historian (b. 1789)
- July 16 – Julia Glover, Irish-born British stage actress (b. ca. 1779)
- July 19 – Margaret Fuller, American journalist (b. 1810)
- July 23 – Vicente Filisola, Italian-born Mexican General (b. 1785)
- July 25 – Richard Barnes Mason, military governor of California (b. 1797)
- August 3 – Jacob Jones, U.S. Navy officer (b. 1768)
- August 6
  - Edward Walsh, Irish poet (b. 1805)
  - Hōne Heke, Maori chief and war leader (b. c. 1807)
- August 13 – Martin Archer Shee, Irish painter, president of the Royal Academy (b. 1770)
- August 17 – General José de San Martín, Argentine military and South American independence hero (b. 1778)
- August 18
  - Charles Arbuthnot, British Tory politician (b. 1767)
  - Honoré de Balzac, French author (b. 1799)
- August 22 – Nikolaus Lenau, Austrian poet (b. 1802)
- August 26 – King Louis Philippe I of France (b. 1773)
- August 27 – Thomas Kidd, English classical scholar, schoolmaster (b. 1770)
- September 2 – Charles Watkin Williams-Wynn, British Tory politician (b. 1775)
- September 12 – Presley O'Bannon, officer in the United States Marine Corps (b. 1784)
- September 22 – Johann Heinrich von Thünen, German economist (b. 1783)
- September 23 – José Gervasio Artigas, Uruguayan revolutionary (b. 1764)

=== October–December ===
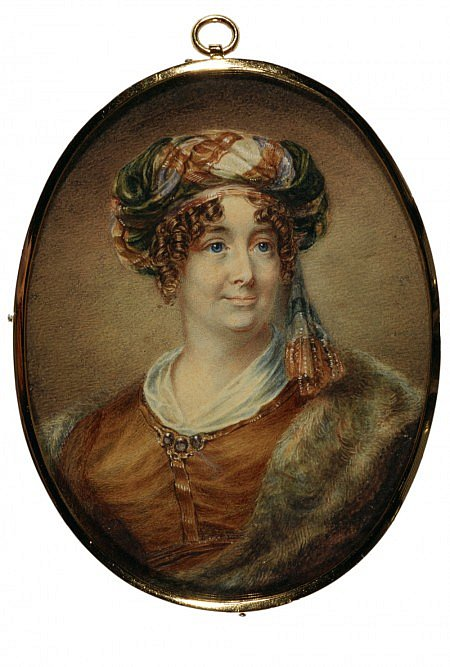
Sarah Biffen

- October 2 – Sarah Biffen, English painter (b. 1784)
- October 11 – Louise, Queen of the Belgians (b. 1812)
- October 17 – Lodewijk van Heiden, Dutch-born Russian admiral (b. 1773)
- October 29 – Marmaduke Williams, Democratic-Republican U.S. Congressman from North Carolina (b. 1774)
- November 2 – Richard Dobbs Spaight Jr., Democratic governor of the U.S. state of North Carolina (b. 1796)
- November 3 – Thomas Ford, governor of Illinois (b. 1800)
- November 4 – Gustav Schwab, German classical scholar (b. 1792)
- November 9 – François-Xavier-Joseph Droz, French writer on ethics and political science (b. 1773)
- November 19 – Richard Mentor Johnson, 9th Vice President of the United States (b. 1780)
- November 22 – Lin Zexu, Chinese politician (b. 1785)
- November 30 – Germain Henri Hess, Swiss chemist, doctor (b. 1802)
- December 4 – William Sturgeon, English physicist, inventor (b. 1783)
- December 10
  - Józef Bem, Polish general (b. 1794)
  - François Sulpice Beudant, French mineralogist, geologist (b. 1787)
- December 22 – William Plumer, American lawyer, lay preacher (b. 1759)
- December 24 – Frédéric Bastiat French author, economist (b. 1801)
- December 28 – Heinrich Christian Schumacher, German astronomer (b. 1780)
- December 30 – Pierre M. Lapie, French cartographer (b. 1777)

=== Date unknown ===
- Mary Anne Whitby, English scientist (b. 1783)
