= 1850 Xichang earthquake =

1850 earthquake in China

- Location within Sichuan Location within China
- Local date: September 12, 1850
- Magnitude: M_{w} 7.3–7.9 M_{s} 7.5–7.7
- Epicenter: 27.8°N 102.3°E
- Areas affected: Qing dynasty
- Max. intensity: MMI XI (Extreme)
- Casualties: 20,650+ dead

The 1850 Xichang earthquake rocked Sichuan Province of Qing China on September 12. The earthquake which caused major damage in Xichang county had an estimated moment magnitude of 7.3–7.9 M_{w} and a surface wave magnitude of 7.5–7.7 M_{s}. An estimated 20,650 people died.

== Tectonic setting ==
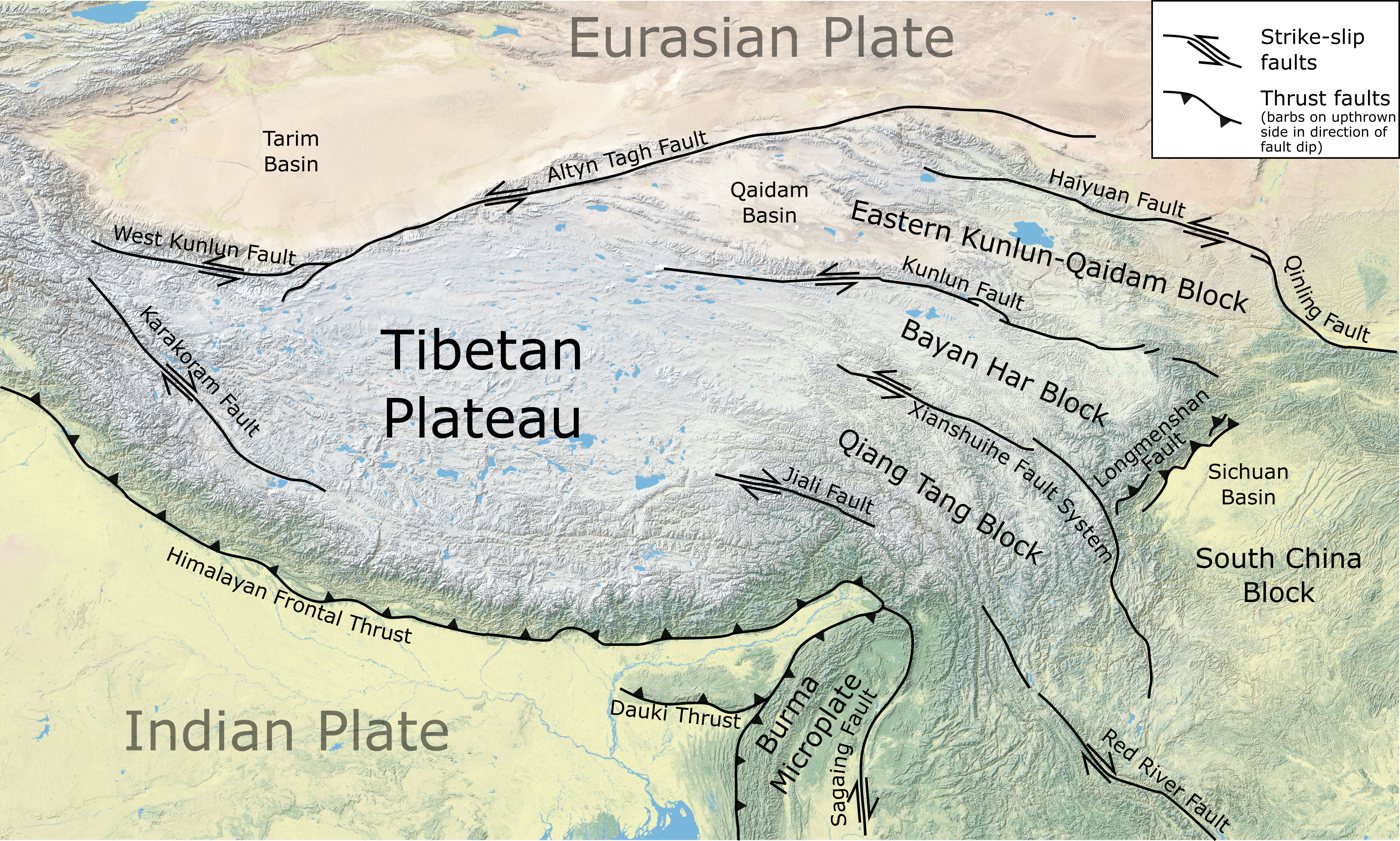
The tectonic overview of the Tibetan Plateau and Sichuan.

Sichuan is situated at the edge of the Tibetan Plateau in a vast zone of complex continental deformation caused by the collision of the Indian Plate with the Eurasian Plate. As the thrusting of the Indian Plate beneath the Eurasian Plate along the Himalayas continues, the continental crust within the Eurasian Plate is actively uplifted and thickened, forming the Tibetan Plateau. There are no active thrust structures within the plateau, therefore, compression is accommodated by strike-slip motion along large structures including the Altyn Tagh Fault, Kunlun Fault, Haiyuan Fault and Xianshuihe fault system. Left-lateral strike-slip motion squeezes the crustal blocks of the Tibetan Plateau outwards, forcing it to move eastwards. Meanwhile, the strike-slip motion also results in east–west extension of the plateau, causing normal faults to break within the thickened crust.

The earthquake occurred as a result of left-lateral strike-slip faulting at a shallow depth on the highly segmented and complex Xianshuihe fault system which extends for 1,400 km (870 mi). Contemporary paleoseismology studies have identified surface ruptures on the Anninghe and Zemuhe faults; segments of the Xianshuihe fault system. The Anninghe Fault is oriented north–south, and extends 200 km (120 mi), while the Zemuhe Fault, strikes northwest for 120 km (75 mi). These faults have varying slip rates of 3.6–4.0 mm (0.14–0.16 in) per year and 3.0–5.0 mm (0.12–0.20 in) per year, respectively.

== Earthquake characteristics ==
The earthquake rupture attracted the attention of seismologists because the Anninghe and Zemuhe faults ruptured during the same event; where a restraining bend could not stop the rupture propagation. Restraining bends or zones of transpression have been previously thought to arrest or cease an earthquake rupture. The restraining bend measuring 30° displayed extensional tectonics was not effective and failed to arrest the rupture.

A maximum coseismic slip of 5–6 m (16–20 ft) was measured along a preserved surface rupture on the Zemuhe Fault. Small thrust faulting offsets of 0.65 m (2 ft 2 in) was also found, although a 2003 field survey and study found fault scarps up to 2 m (6 ft 7 in) high. The associated surface ruptures were well-preserved with visible fault scarps. Past earthquakes involving the Zemuhe Fault were also recorded in 6000 BC, 4250 BC, and 814 AD in the paleoseismic records. The recurrence interval of large earthquakes on the fault is 1,400 to 1,700 years, with a minimum of 1,000 years.

Rupture on the southern section of the Anninghe Fault also resulted in a zone of high-intensity shaking assigned VII–VIII. The surface offsets on the Anninghe Fault are much smaller, ranging from 1–1.5 m (3 ft 3 in – 4 ft 11 in). Based on the historical documentation of the event and its associated surface ruptures, the total ruptured length on both faults is at least 150 km (93 mi). A seismic intensity isoseismic contour of VII–XI on the China seismic intensity scale was determined along the rupture trace of the Zemuhe Fault, indicating most of the rupture took place on that fault. Calculating the moment magnitude using the rupture length yielded a magnitude of M_{w} 7.6–7.9 (7.6 ± 0.3). The Anninghe Fault previously ruptured in 1536 based on paleoseismic evidence along the fault trace. It had an estimated magnitude of 7.5 and ruptured a 30 km (19 mi) section of the fault. A maximum left-lateral offset of 4 m (13 ft) was estimated.

== Impact and aftermath ==
In Xichang, the meizoseismal area, the city walls were torn down, and three gate towers collapsed. All government buildings, warehouses, temples, and prisons were razed to the ground. Many homes constructed of thatched and ceramic tiles were destroyed and rubble occupied the streets. At least 27,880 families were made homeless while 20,650 people died. In Huili County, 2,876 residents were killed by collapsing homes. Severe damage occurred in the 14 residential areas in the county. Hundreds died in Qiaojia County. Several deaths were also reported in Puge County, Zhaojue County, Yanyuan County, and Mianning County.

A massive ground fissure measuring 33 m (108 ft) by 10 m (33 ft), and 17 m (56 ft) deep opened in the city ground. Trees were uprooted and toppled while roads cracked. Several large landslides occurred near Qiong Lake. Ground failures and fissuring led to water erupting out of the ground. Major liquefaction events such as the ejection of water and sand occurred at Beishan Mountains, Qiong Lake and the Anning River. Villages along the banks of Qiong Lake were flooded.

The destruction left by the earthquake was the third to seriously affect Xichang. The earthquakes in 1536 and 1732 also caused great devastation, killing thousands. The Xichang Earthquake Forest near Xichang was established as a memorial for the victims of these earthquakes. The events were documented and inscripted onto stele monuments.

== See also ==
- List of earthquakes in China
- List of earthquakes in Sichuan
- List of historical earthquakes
