= Carex liangshanensis =

Scientific classification
- Kingdom: Plantae
- Clade: Embryophytes
- Clade: Tracheophytes
- Clade: Angiosperms
- Clade: Monocots
- Clade: Commelinids
- Order: Poales
- Family: Cyperaceae
- Genus: Carex
- Species: C. liangshanensis

Binomial name
- Carex liangshanensis S.R.Zhang

Species of sedge

Carex liangshanensis is a tussock-forming perennial in the family Cyperaceae. It is endemic to south-central parts of China in the provinces of Xichang and Sichuan.

== See also ==
- List of Carex species
