= Minsheng Township, Sichuan =

Minsheng Township 民胜乡
- Township
- Minshengxiang
- Location in Sichuan
- Coordinates: 28°4′45″N 102°3′59″E
- Country: People's Republic of China
- Province: Sichuan
- Autonomous prefecture: Liangshan Yi Autonomous Prefecture
- County: Xichang

Area
  - Total: 161.7 km^{2} (62.4 sq mi)

Population (2010)
  - Total: 9,905
  - Density: 61.26/km^{2} (158.7/sq mi)
- Time zone: UTC+8 (China Standard)

Minsheng (Mandarin: 民胜乡) is a township in Xichang, Liangshan Yi Autonomous Prefecture, Sichuan, China. In 2010, Minsheng Township had a total population of 9,905: 5,144 males and 4,761 females: 3,564 aged under 14, 5,833 aged between 15 and 65 and 508 aged over 65.
