= Xichan Temple =

Xichan Temple (simplified Chinese: 西禅寺; traditional Chinese: 西禪寺; pinyin: Xīchán Sì), may refer to:

- Xichan Temple (Fujian), in Fuzhou, Fujian, China
- Xichan Temple (Hunan), in Huarong County, Hunan, China
- Xichan Temple (Sichuan), in Xichang, Sichuan, China
