= 1536 Xichang earthquake =

1536 earthquake in China

- Location within Sichuan Location within China
- Local date: March 20, 1536
- Magnitude: M_{s} 7.3
- Epicenter: 28.1°N 102.1°E
- Areas affected: Ming dynasty
- Max. intensity: MMI X (Extreme)
- Casualties: thousands

On 20 March 1536, Xichang (then known as Jianchang) and Mianning, Sichuan, Ming dynasty, were struck by an earthquake with an estimated magnitude of 7.3 M_{s}. It had a maximum felt intensity of X (Extreme) on the Modified Mercalli intensity scale, and caused thousands of deaths.

== Tectonic setting ==
Xichang lies on the eastern edge of the Tibetan Plateau, which is an area of thickened crust, which has been formed by the ongoing collision between the Indian Plate and the Eurasian Plate. The plateau is spreading laterally eastwards, to southeastwards, partly accommodated by a series of major strike-slip faults. The Sichuan–Yunnan block is bounded to the northeast and east by the left lateral Xianshuihe fault system and to the southwest by the right lateral Red River Fault. Xichang is sited at the southern end of the Anninge segment of the Xianshuihe fault system, close to its junction with the Zemuhe segment.

== Earthquake ==
Estimates for the magnitude of this earthquake vary in the range 7.3–7.5. Although the 1850 Xichang earthquake is thought to have ruptured both the Anninge and Zemuhe segments, the 1536 event probably only ruptured the more northerly Anninge segment. This is supported by paleoseismological investigations. A trench dug across the northern end of the Anninge segment found evidence of a rupture consistent with the 1536 event but a trench across the northern end of the Zemuhe segment lacked any such evidence.

== Damage ==
The extent of damage and casualties was reported by Yuancheng Cao, the official responsible for judging affairs in Sichuan. In Xichang all buildings were destroyed, including government offices, prisons, storehouses and houses (both military and civilian). The city walls, gates, battlements and watchtowers collapsed. Many people were crushed to death, including several senior officials. Further north in Mianning, every house was destroyed and the city walls completely collapsed and thousands were killed. Parts of the city walls also collapsed in Yuexi, Qionglai, Ya'an, Dayi and Meishan.

== See also ==
- List of earthquakes in China
- List of earthquakes in Sichuan
- List of historical earthquakes
