= Daxing Township, Xichang =

Daxing Township 大兴乡
- Township
- Location in Sichuan
- Coordinates: 27°50′45″N 102°21′53″E
- Country: People's Republic of China
- Province: Sichuan
- Autonomous prefecture: Liangshan Yi Autonomous Prefecture
- County-level city: Xichang
- Time zone: UTC+8 (China Standard)

Daxing Township (simplified Chinese: 大兴乡; traditional Chinese: 大興鄉; pinyin: Dàxīng Xiāng) is a township under the administration of Xichang, Sichuan, China. As of 2018, it has three villages under its administration.

== See also ==
- List of township-level divisions of Sichuan
