= Xichan Temple (Sichuan) =

Buddhist temple in Xichang, Sichuan, China

- 西禅寺
- Location within Sichuan

Religion
- Affiliation: Buddhism
- Deity: Chan Buddhism

Location
- Location: Lizhou Town, Xichang, Sichuan
- Country: China
- Interactive map of Xichan Temple
- Coordinates: 28°03′27″N 102°11′01″E

Architecture
- Style: Chinese architecture
- Established: 1577
- Completed: 1989 (reconstruction)

Xichan Temple (simplified Chinese: 西禅寺; traditional Chinese: 西禪寺; pinyin: Xīchán Sì) is a Buddhist temple located in Lizhou Town of Xichang, Sichuan, China.

== History ==
The temple traces its origins to the former Temple of Guru (祖师庙), founded in 1577 during the reign of Wanli Emperor in the Ming dynasty (1368–1644) and would later become the Xichan Temple.

On May 19, 1935, while the Red Army led by Zhou Enlai marched from Sichuan to Shaanxi, they stayed at Xichan Temple for six days.

After the 3rd Plenary Session of the 11th Central Committee of the Chinese Communist Party, according to the national policy of free religious belief, Xichan Temple was reopened for worshiping. In 1989 Master Jishan (济善) supervised the reconstruction of Xichan Temple on the original site.
