= Taihe, Xichang =

Taihe 太和镇
- Town
- Location in Sichuan
- Coordinates: 27°54′24″N 102°9′24″E
- Country: People's Republic of China
- Province: Sichuan
- Autonomous prefecture: Liangshan Yi Autonomous Prefecture
- County-level city: Xichang
- Time zone: UTC+8 (China Standard)

Taihe (Chinese: 太和; pinyin: Tàihé) is a town under the administration of Xichang, Sichuan, China. As of 2020, it has two residential neighborhoods and three villages under its administration:

Neighborhoods

- Taikang Community (太康社区)
- Xiaomaliu Community (小麻柳社区)

Villages

- Taihe Village
- Tai'an Village (太安村)
- Jiulong Village (九龙村)
