= Hainan Township, Sichuan =

Hainan Township 海南乡
- Township
- Location in Sichuan
- Coordinates: 27°47′56″N 102°18′30″E
- Country: People's Republic of China
- Province: Sichuan
- Autonomous prefecture: Liangshan Yi Autonomous Prefecture
- County-level city: Xichang
- Time zone: UTC+8 (China Standard)

Hainan Township (simplified Chinese: 海南乡; traditional Chinese: 海南鄉; pinyin: Hǎinán Xiāng) is a township under the administration of Xichang, in southern Sichuan, China. As of 2018, it has four villages under its administration.
