= Xichang railway station =

Rail station in Sichuan Province, China

Xichang 西昌站 ꀒꎂꍉ
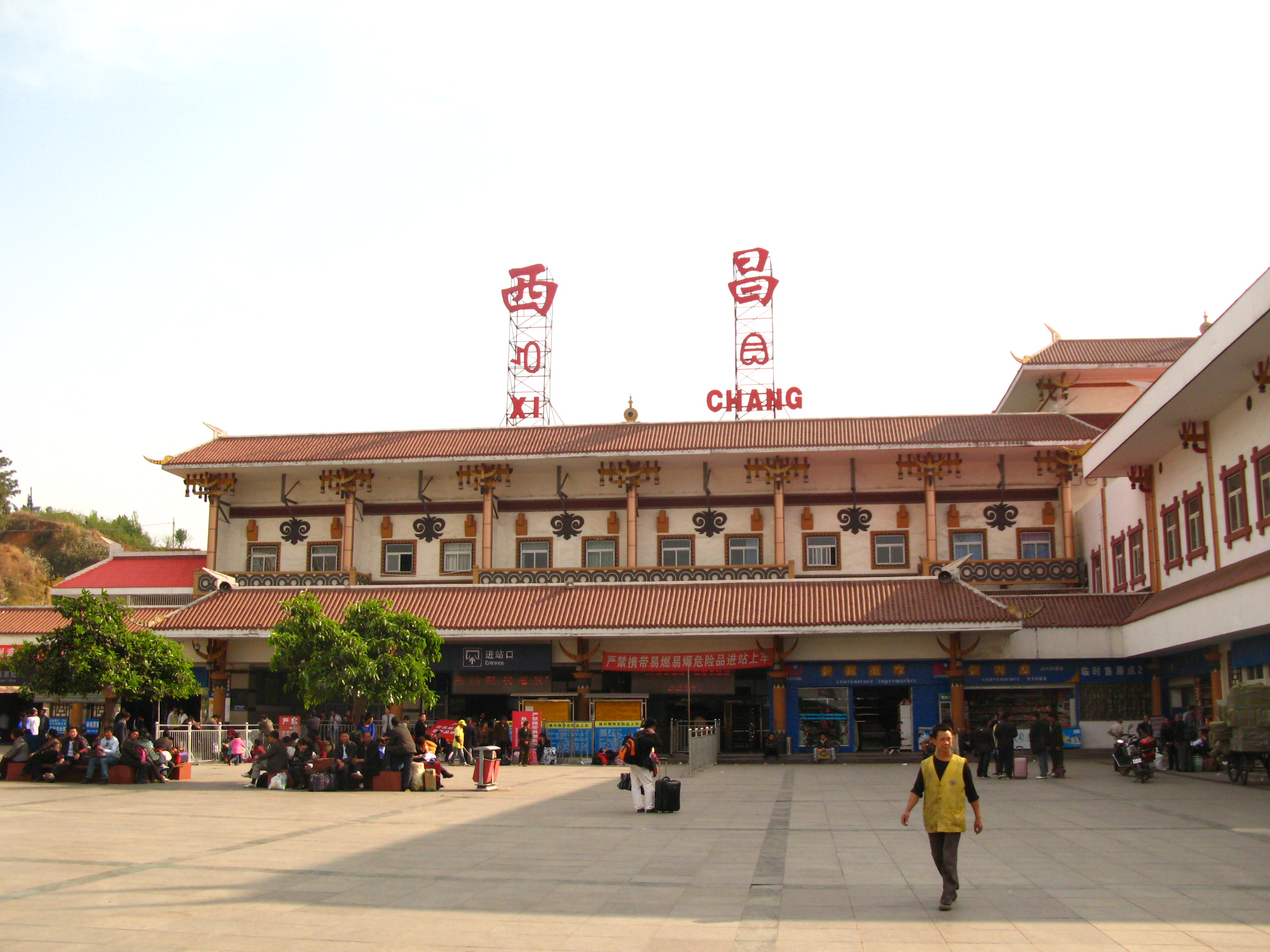

General information
- Coordinates: 27.880086°N 102.222954°E
- Line: Chengdu–Kunming railway
- Platforms: 3

Other information
- Station code: 47921
Location

Xichang Station (Chinese: 西昌站, Yi: ꀒꎂꍉ, romanized: Op Rro Zhap /ʊ˨˩dʐʊ˧ t͡ʂâ/) is a railway station on the Chengdu–Kunming line, located at No. 6 Yingbin Road, Yuanjiashan Village, Xiaomiao Township, Xichang City, Liangshan Yi Autonomous Prefecture, Sichuan Province, built in 1970, currently a third-class station under the jurisdiction of the Xichang Depot of Chengdu Railway Bureau, with a postal code of 615000. Current passenger transportation: handling passenger boarding and landing; Baggage and parcels are checked in, and freight business is not handled.

== Station structure ==
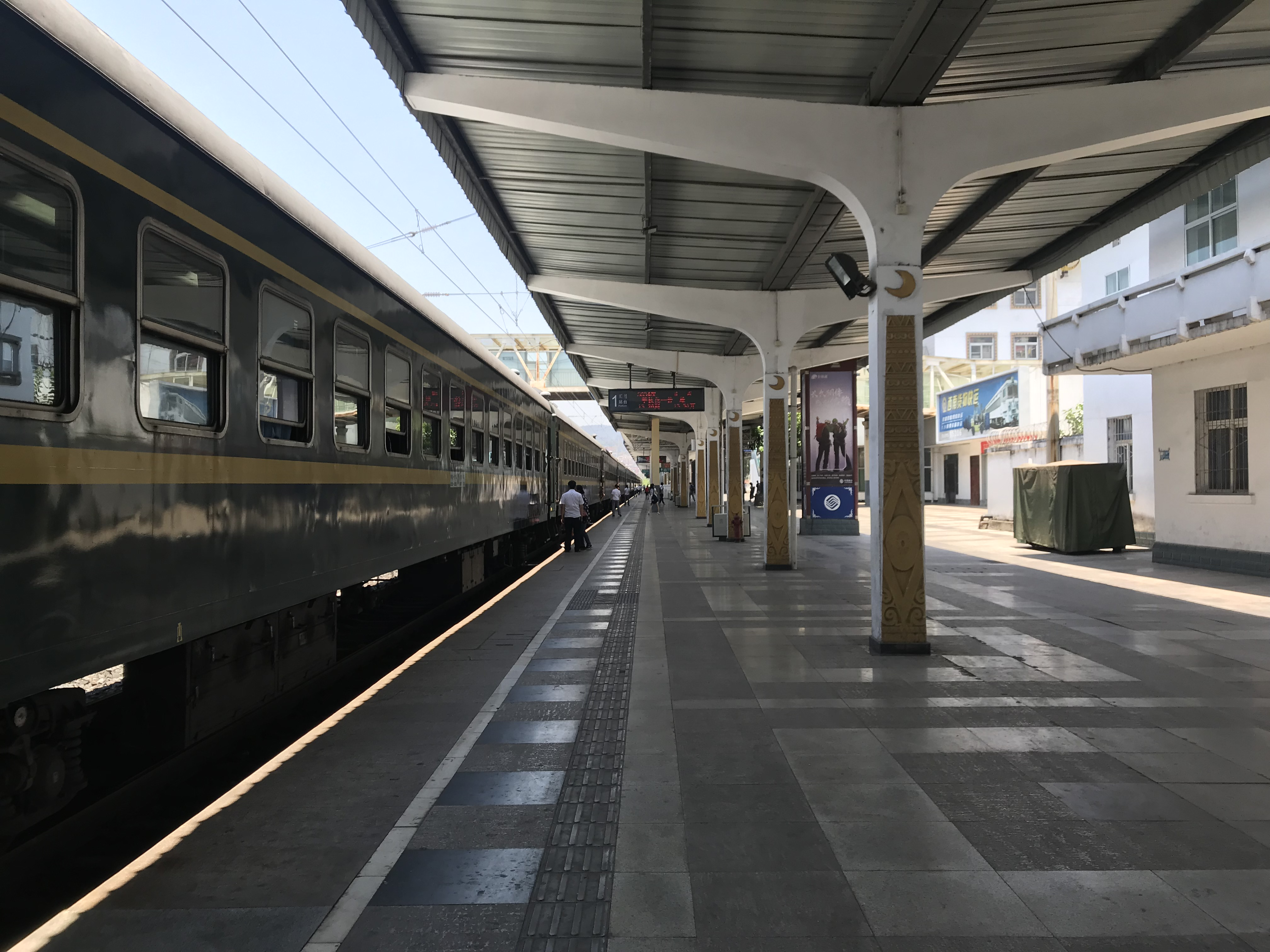
Platform 1

=== Station room ===
The station building currently used by Xichang Station was built in 1997 and completed on August 5, 1998. The station covers an area of 7,295 m^{2} (78,520 sq ft), including 4 ticket windows at the ticket office and a number of self-service ticket machines; The waiting room covers an area of 1,042 m^{2} (11,220 sq ft). Above the ticket gate in the waiting room, there is a 14.6×6-meter mural "Liangshan Love" (Note: 凉山情), created by local Yi artist Leso Ag, depicting the grandeur of the Yi Torch Festival.

=== Standyard ===
Xichang Station has 1 main line, 4 arrival and departure lines and 1 freight line, with a side platform and an island platform. There are wooden special lines and overhaul lines on the east side of the Kunming end of the station, and the power supply section and catenary work area on the west side.

Freight lines	Chengkun railway Freight trains
Punctual line	Chengkun railway Passenger trains
Punctual line	Chengkun railway Passenger trains
Platform 3	Chengkun railway Train
Island platform
Platform 2	Chengkun railway Positive line
Platform 1	Chengkun railway Passenger trains
Side platform
