= Madao Subdistrict, Sichuan =

Madao Subdistrict 马道街道
- Subdistrict
- Madaojiedao
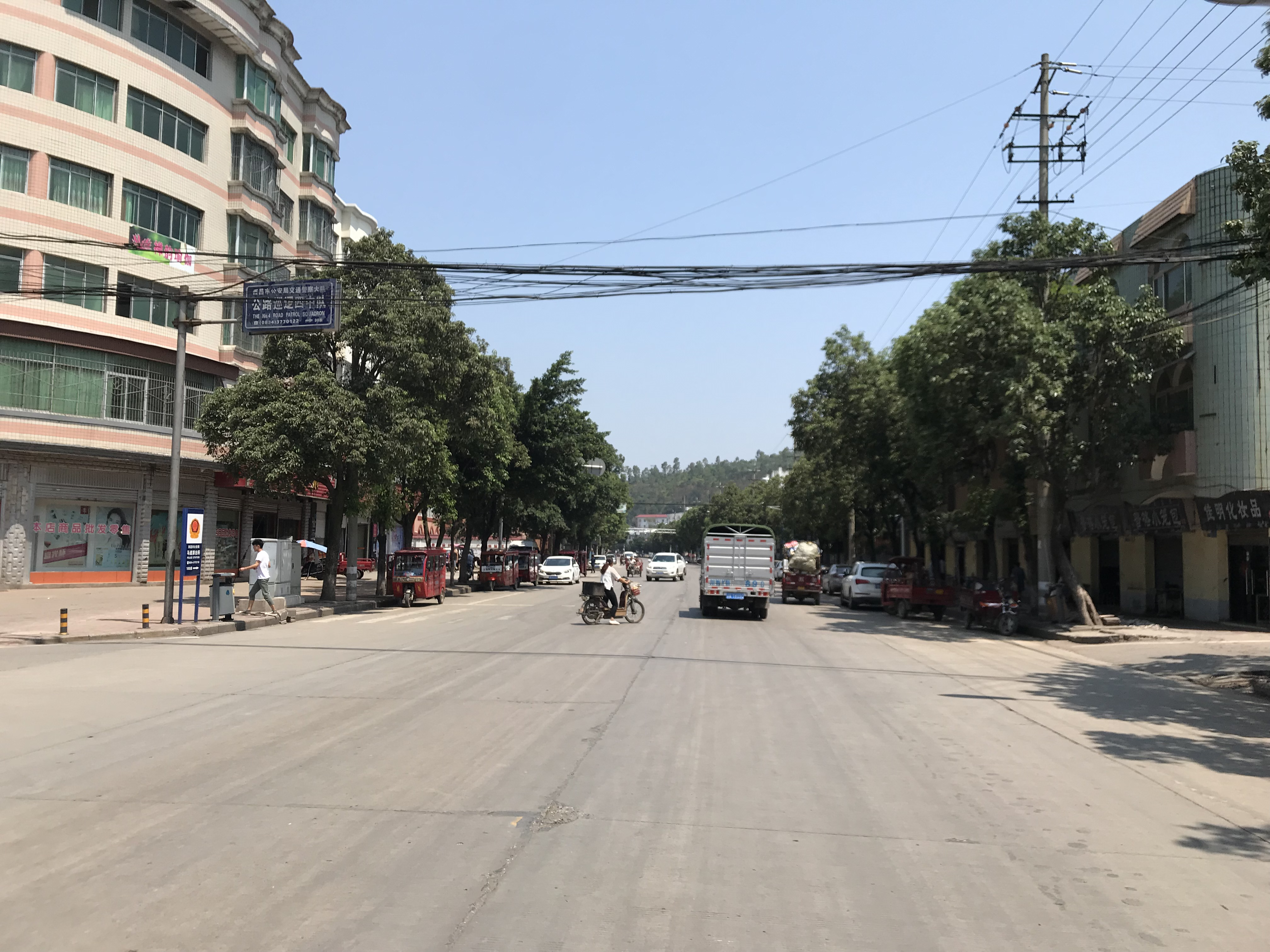

- Location in Sichuan
- Coordinates: 27°50′25″N 102°12′58″E
- Country: People's Republic of China
- Province: Sichuan
- Autonomous prefecture: Liangshan Yi Autonomous Prefecture
- County: Xichang

Area
  - Total: 27.44 km^{2} (10.59 sq mi)

Population (2010)
  - Total: 19,427
  - Density: 708.0/km^{2} (1,834/sq mi)
- Time zone: UTC+8 (China Standard)

Madao (Mandarin: 马道街道) is a town in Xichang, Liangshan Yi Autonomous Prefecture, Sichuan, China. In 2010, Madao Subdistrict had a total population of 19,427: 10,068 males and 9,359 females: 2,853 aged under 14, 14,343 aged between 15 and 65 and 2,231 aged over 65.
