= Baru, Sichuan =

Baru 巴汝镇
- Town
- Location in Sichuan
- Coordinates: 27°52′46″N 101°59′3″E
- Country: People's Republic of China
- Province: Sichuan
- Autonomous prefecture: Liangshan Yi Autonomous Prefecture
- County-level city: Xichang
- Time zone: UTC+8 (China Standard)

Baru (Chinese: 巴汝; pinyin: Bārǔ) is a town under the administration of Xichang, Sichuan, China. As of 2020, it administers the following six villages:

- Jiawu Village (甲乌村)
- Hebian Village (河边村)
- Baima Village (白马村)
- Malu Village (马鹿村)
- Bazhe Village (巴折村)
- Makuang Village (马筐村)

Baru was formed in December 2019 by merging the former Baru Township, Yinchang Township (银厂乡), and Baima Township (白马乡).

== See also ==
- List of township-level divisions of Sichuan
