= Qiong Lake =

Freshwater lake in Sichuan, China

- Qionghai
- 邛海 (Chinese)
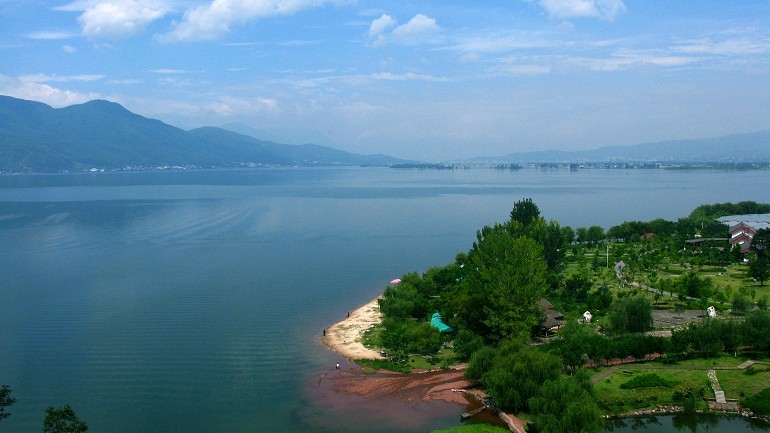
- View of Qiong Lake from the east with Xichang in the background

- Location in Sichuan
- Location: Xichang, Liangshan, Sichuan, China
- Coordinates: 27°49′17″N 102°18′37″E
- Primary outflows: Anning River
- Max. length: 11.5 km (7.1 mi)
- Max. width: 5.5 km (3.4 mi)
- Surface area: 30 km^{2} (12 mi^{2})
- Average depth: 14 m (46 ft)
- Surface elevation: 1,509 m (4,951 ft)

Qiong Lake (Chinese: 邛海; pinyin: Qiónghǎi), sometimes tautologically referred to as Qionghai Lake, is a freshwater lake in Liangshan Prefecture, Sichuan, and is the second largest lake in Sichuan. The lake is located in a depression on the east side of the Anning River valley, in a mountainous region of the province between the Hengduan Mountains and the Yungui Plateau. Xichang, the capital of Liangshan Prefecture, is located on the northwest shores of the lake and the entire of the lake is within Xichang County.

In the 21st century, the lake and surrounding area has been developed as a scenic tourist destination.
