= Anning River =

River in the People's Republic of China

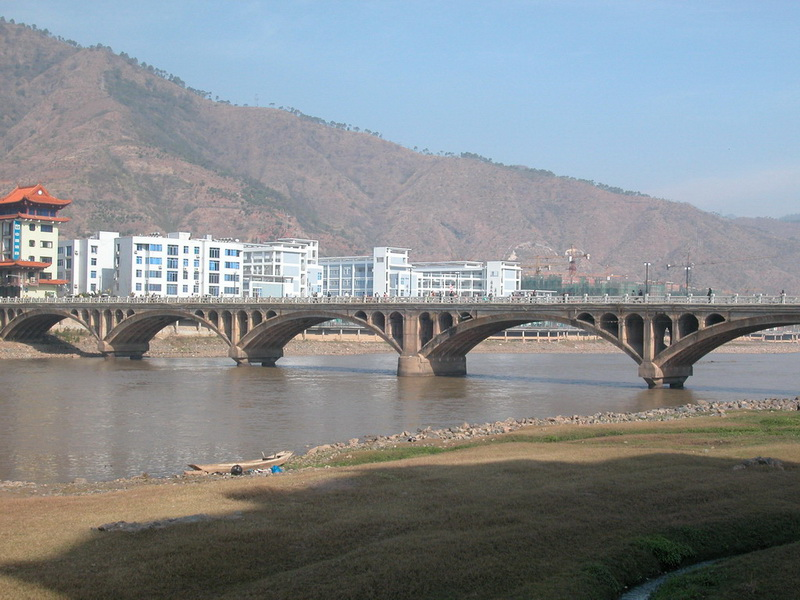
- The Anning River in Miyi County

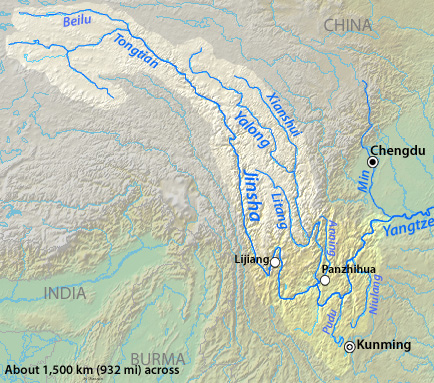
- Map of the Jinsha River basing showing the Anning River in the lower right
- Native name: 安宁河 (Chinese)

Location
- Country: China
- Province: Sichuan
- Prefecture(s): Liangshan, Panzhihua

Physical characteristics
- Source: Xiaoxiang Range
  - coordinates: 28°48′24″N 102°24′48″E
- Mouth
  - coordinates: 26°43′40″N 101°51′41″E
- Length: 320 km (200 mi)
- Basin size: 11,000 km^{2} (4,200 mi^{2})

Basin features
- Tributaries
  - left: Sunshui River

The Anning River (Chinese: 安宁河; pinyin: Ānníng Hé; Yi: ꀈꉙꑗꒉ, romanized: At Hxop Nyo Yy) is a river in the Hengduan Mountains region of southwestern Sichuan, China. The river is a tributary of the Yalong River, itself a tributary of the Jinsha River which is the head stream of the Yangtze. The river is located primarily in Liangshan Prefecture except for the mouth of the river which enters the Yalong in Panzhihua Prefecture.

== Geography ==
=== Course of the river ===
The Anning River has its source at the southern Xiaoxiang Range in Mianning County, Liangshan. From here, it flows in a southerly direction between the southern Daxue Mountains and the Xiaoxiang through the Anning River Plain and meets its largest left tributary, the Sunshui River, at Luguzhen. Measured to the furthest source, the Sunshui forms the main stem of the Anning. Continuing south, the Anning River Plain widens and provides for greater human activity. The capital of Liangshan, Xichang, is located at the widest extent of the valley to the east of the river.

The Anning exits the Anning River Plain in Dechang County and flows south-southwesterly until it meets the Yalong River in Yanbian County, Panzhihua. The total length of the river is 320 km (200 mi).

=== Anning River Plain ===
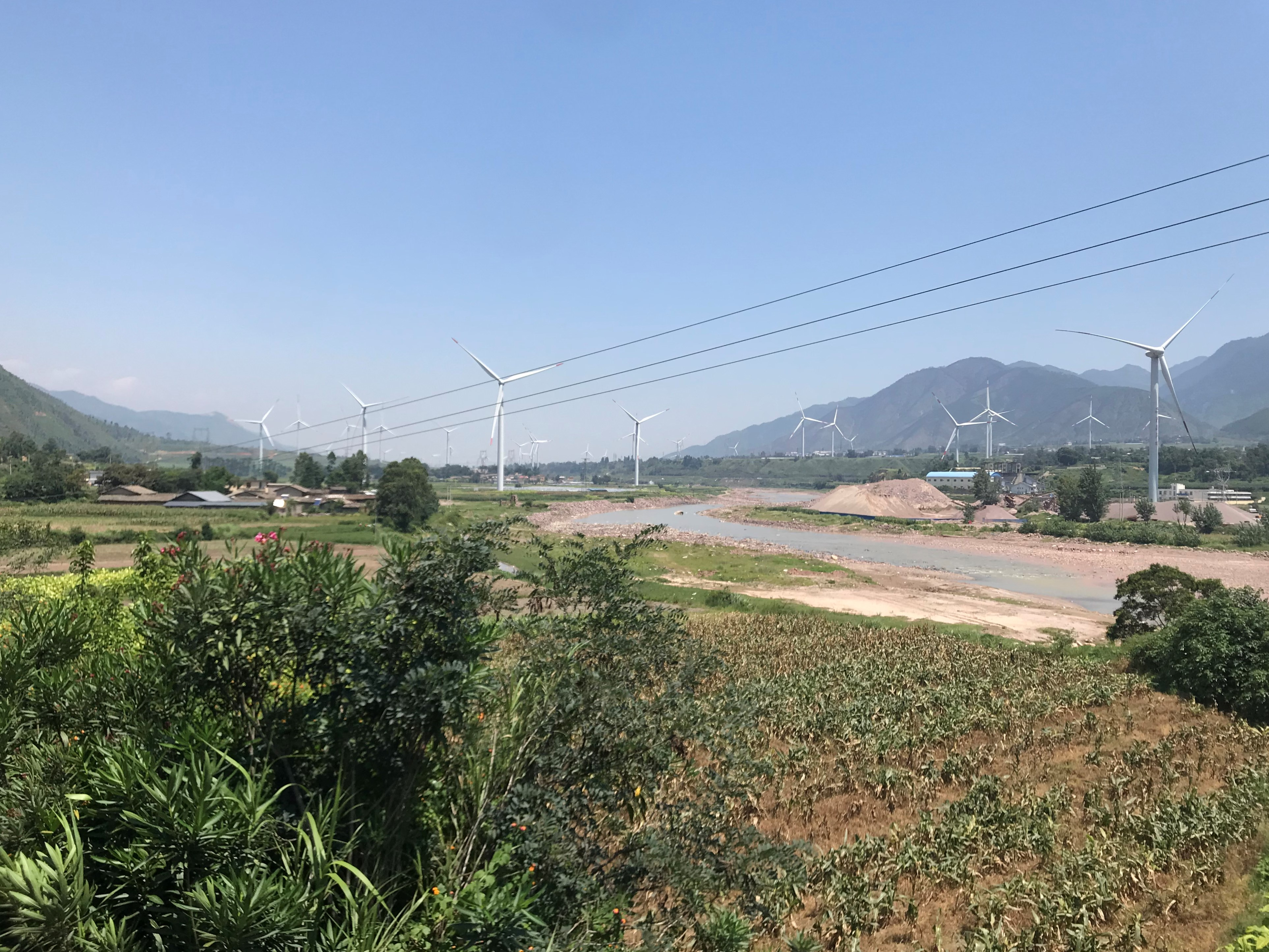
The Anning River Plain

Unlike other larger river valleys in the region, including those of the deeply-incised Yalong and Jinsha Rivers, the Anning River has a relatively flat valley known as the Anning River Plain (Chinese: 安宁河谷平原). For the 125 km (78 mi) section of river between Mianning and Dechang, the valley stretches between 4 km (2.5 mi) and 10 km (6.2 mi) wide. The Anning River Plain is the largest valley plain in southwest Sichuan with an area of 1,800 km^{2} (690 mi^{2}) and its fertile soils support a variety of agricultural activities. The plain, and in fact the entire Anning River's course, follows the tectonically active Anninghe Fault where a southeastern portion of the Tibetan Plateau abuts the Yangtze Plate. Qiong Lake is found on the eastern edge of the Anning River Plain, approximately 10 km (6.2 mi) from the Anning River.

== History ==
There is evidence of human activity in the Anning River basin since the Neolithic Age. Burial tombs from this era have been uncovered. In the last 3,000 years, the Anning River basin developed as the heartland for the Yi People who migrated from the Tibetan Plateau and supplanted or assimilated with the original inhabitants. In the 2nd century BCE, the Anning River basin was incorporated into Han dynasty China as it provided a crucial direct route between the Sichuan Basin and the annexed Dian kingdom in present-day Yunnan. Qiongdu (now known as Xichang) was the primary settlement in the region and was a territorial garrison of the Han. The Anning River valley drifted in and out of Chinese administration through subsequent dynasties until its control by the Chinese was solidified in the Ming dynasty.

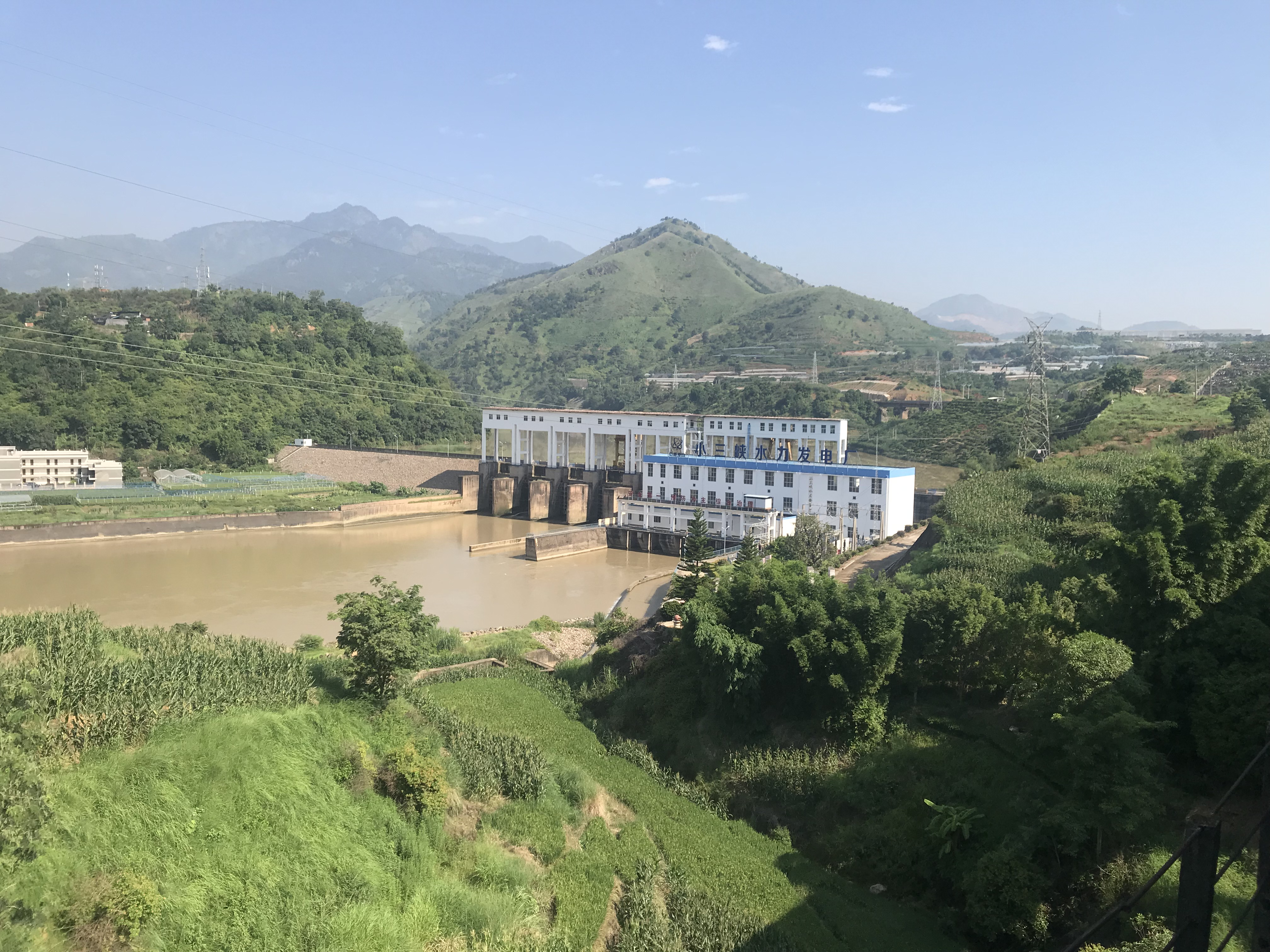
The Xiaosanxia Dam on the Anning River

In addition to being a major source of agriculture for the region, the Anning River and its valley has served as a major transportation corridor in southwest China, particularly between the major cities of Kunming and Chengdu. The Chengdu–Kunming railway, completed in 1970, and the G5 Expressway, completed in 2018, both follow the course of the Anning River.

Several dams have been constructed along the Anning River's length, including the Chengnan Dam, Qianjinqu Dam, and Xiaosanxia Dam.
