= Pierre M. Lapie =

French cartographer and engraver

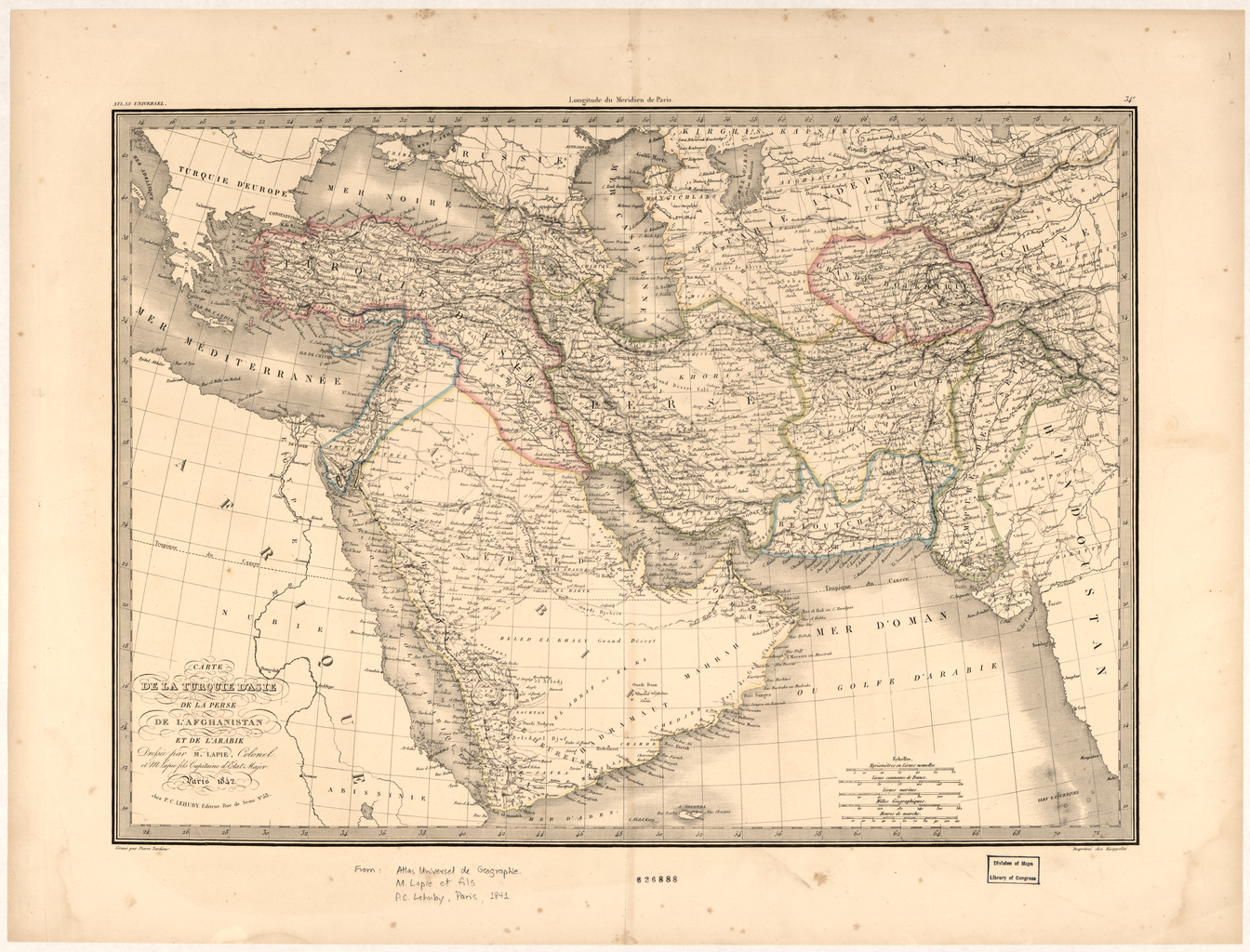
Map of Asian-Eastern Turkey, Persia, Afghanistan, Balochistan, and Arabia by Pierre M. Lapie

Pierre M. Lapie (1777 or 1779 – 1850) was a French cartographer and engraver. He was the father of cartographer Alexandre Emile Lapie. Lapie was a Colonel in the French army, where he worked in the corps of topographical engineers. Lapie worked closely with his son and published works together and individually. The work of Lapie and his son was influential on German commercial map makers in the 19th century. Works by Lapie are held in the collection of the Library of Congress.

== Biography ==
An officer in the French Army, he joined the Corps of Geographical Engineers in 1799 and took part in several campaigns during the Consulate and the First French Empire. Promoted to captain in 1800, he was put in charge of major surveying projects. Appointed director of King Louis XVIII’s Topography office in 1814, he was promoted to squadron commander in 1819.

As director of the surveying work and subsequent production of the map of France, he was promoted to lieutenant colonel in 1829. Appointed head of the topographical section of the War Dépôt de la Guerre in 1830, he was promoted to the rank of colonel on the General Staff in 1832 and retired in September 1838.

Colonel Lapie is a Knight of the Order of Saint Louis and an Officer of the Legion of Honour.

As a creator of globes, atlases, and maps, he contributed to numerous publications. He was the father of Alexandre Emile Lapie, also a cartographer, with whom he collaborated.

== Works ==
- 1812, Atlas Classique et Universel
- 1842, Atlas universel de géographie ancienne et moderne with Alexandre Emile Lapie

== Gallery ==
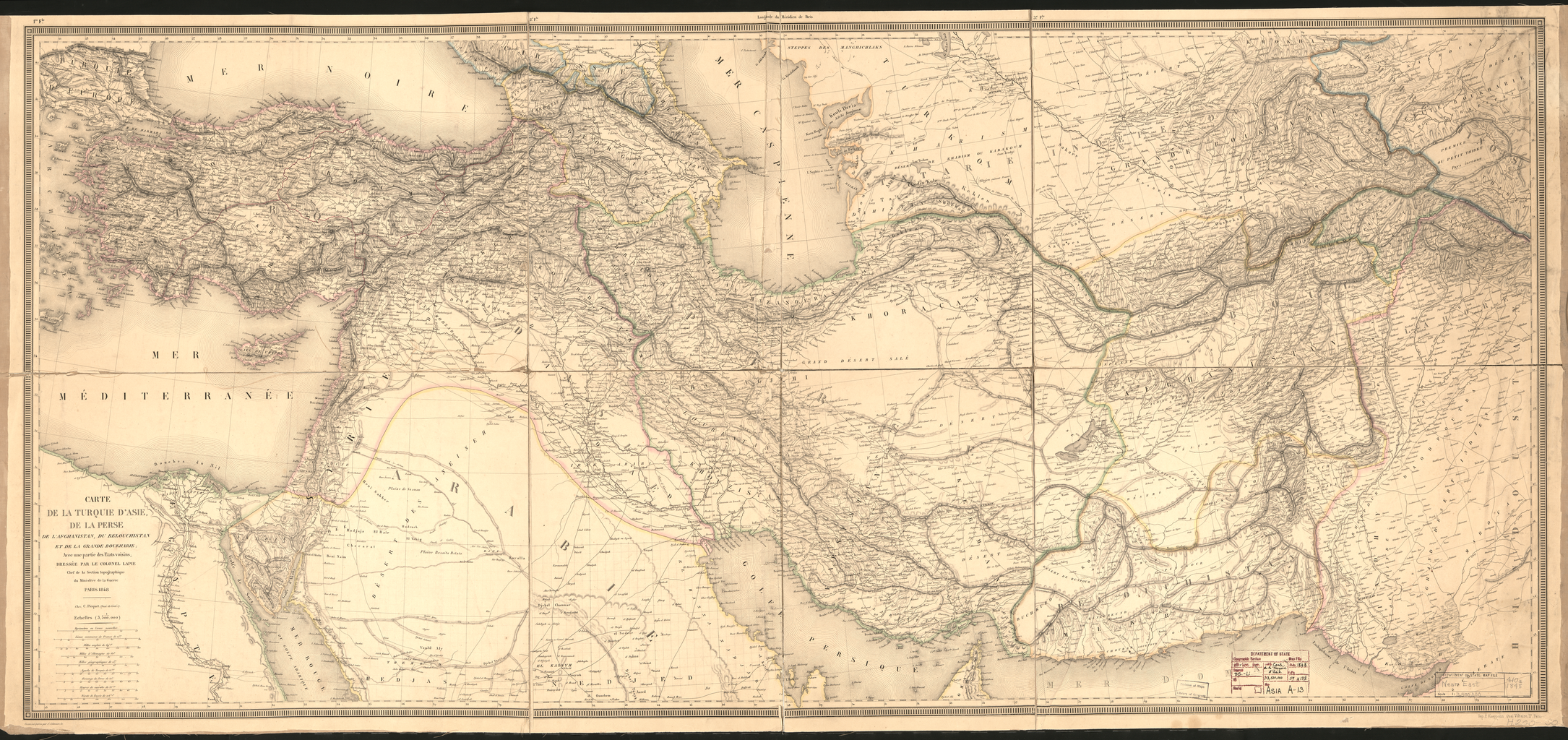
Map of Asian Turkey, Persia, Afghanistan, Balochistan, and the Khanate of Bukhara, with Some of the Neighboring Countries, 1848

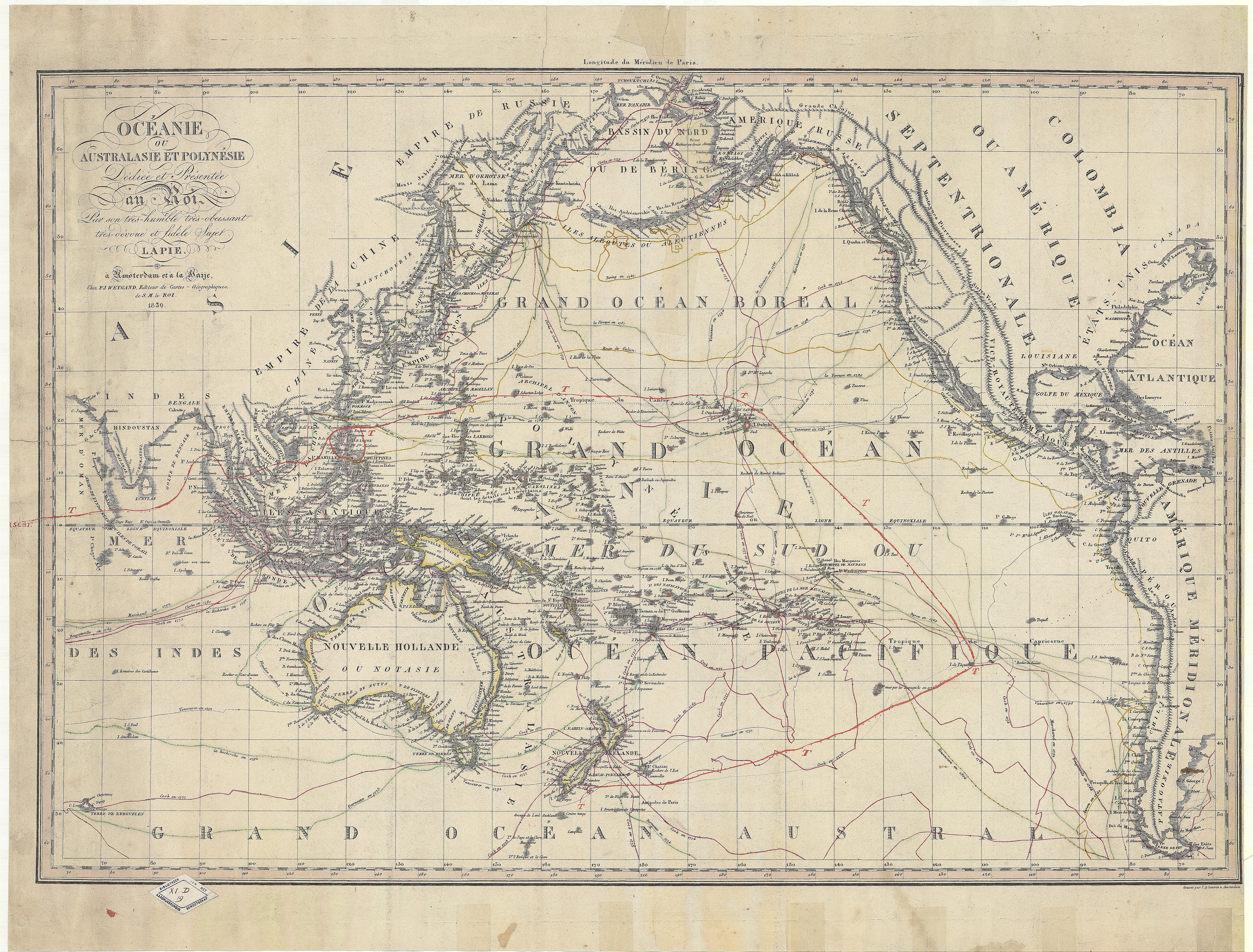
Map of the exploration of Australasia and Polynesia

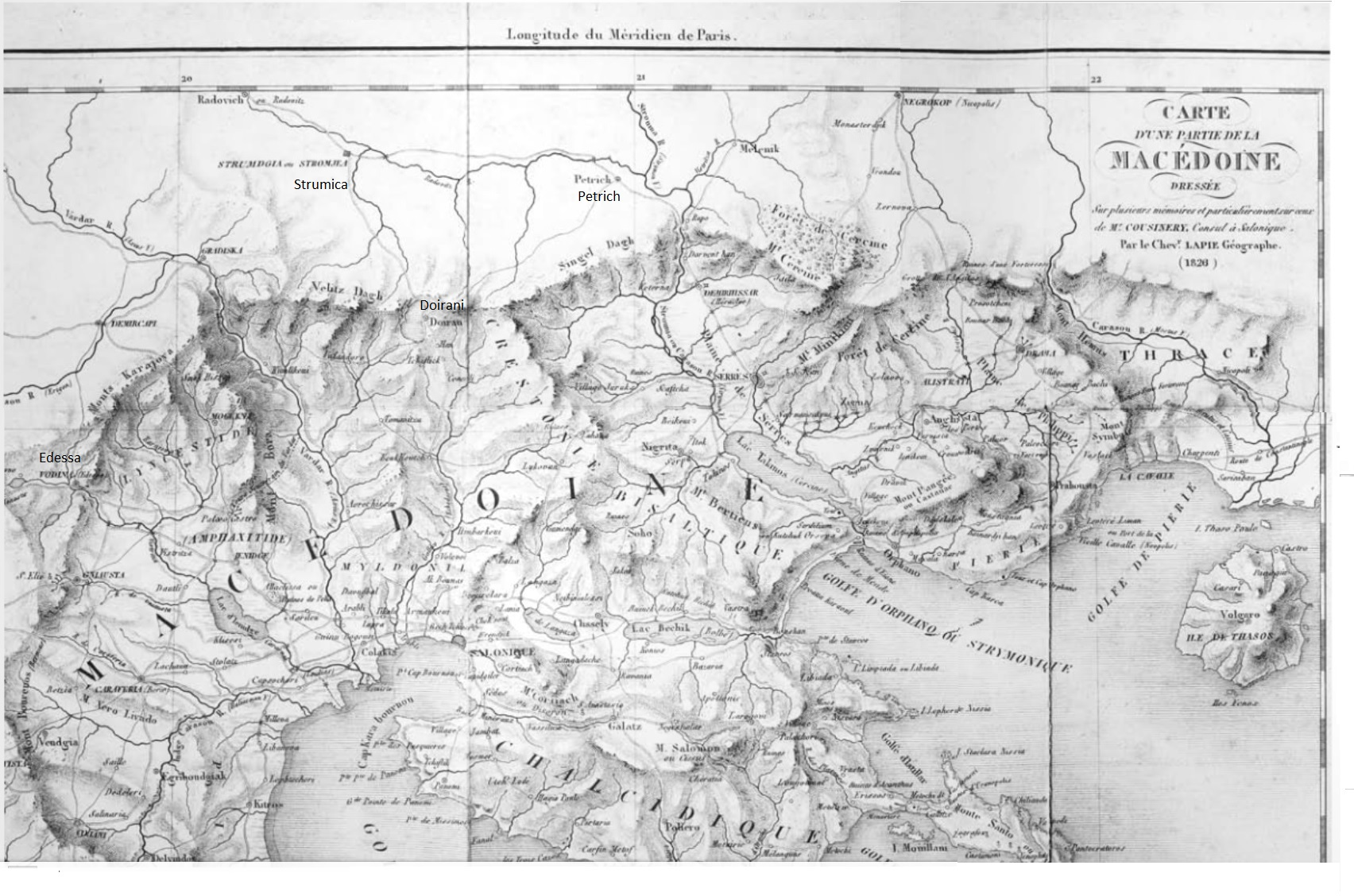
Part of Macedonia (1826). From Ευάγγ. Λιβιεράτος & Χρυσούλα Παλιαδέλη "Ευρωπαϊκή χαρτογραφία και πολιτική. ...", (European chartography and politics...), Thessaloniki, 2013, p. 141
