= Xichang =

Xichang 西昌市 · ꀒꎂꏃ
- County-level city
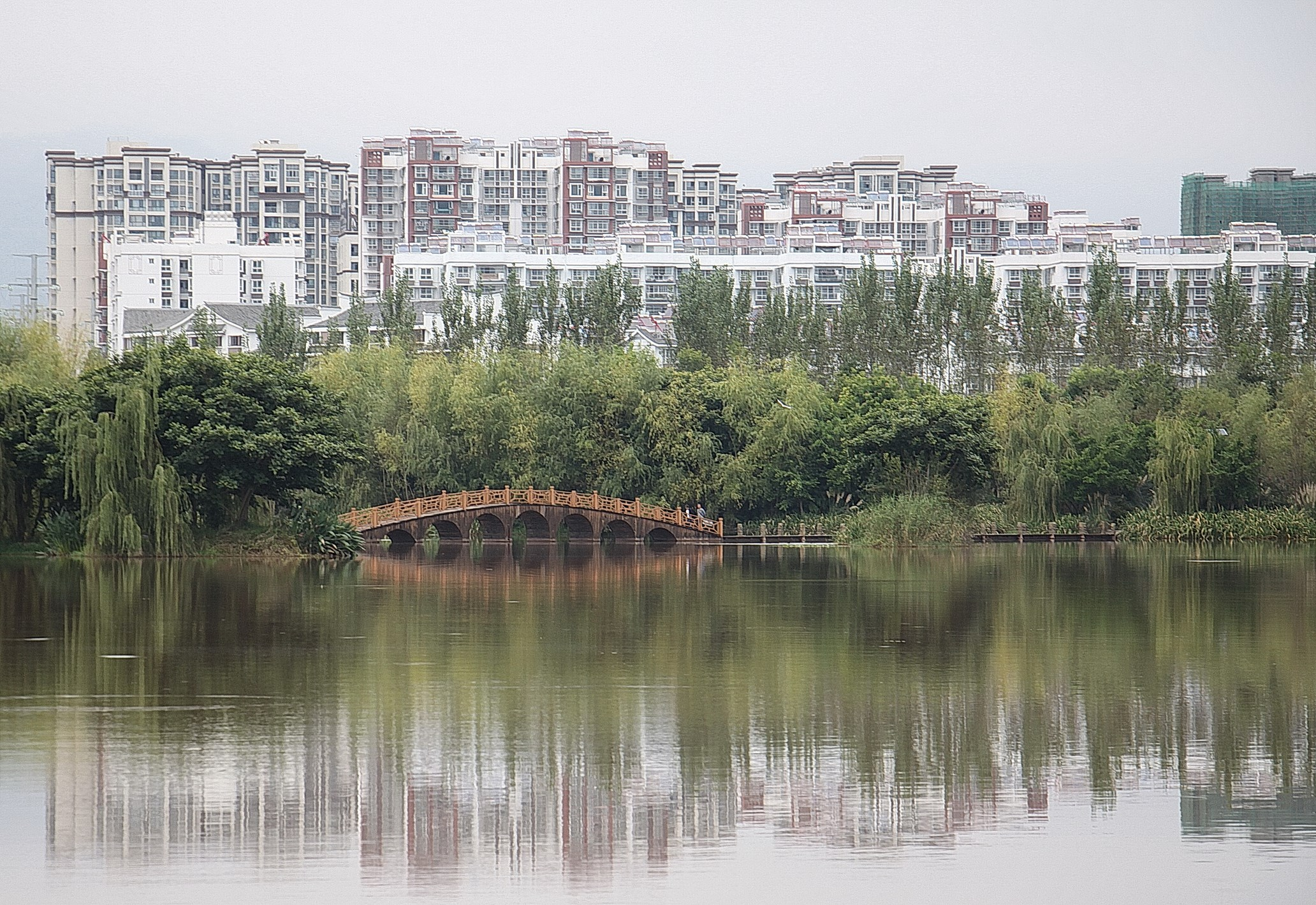

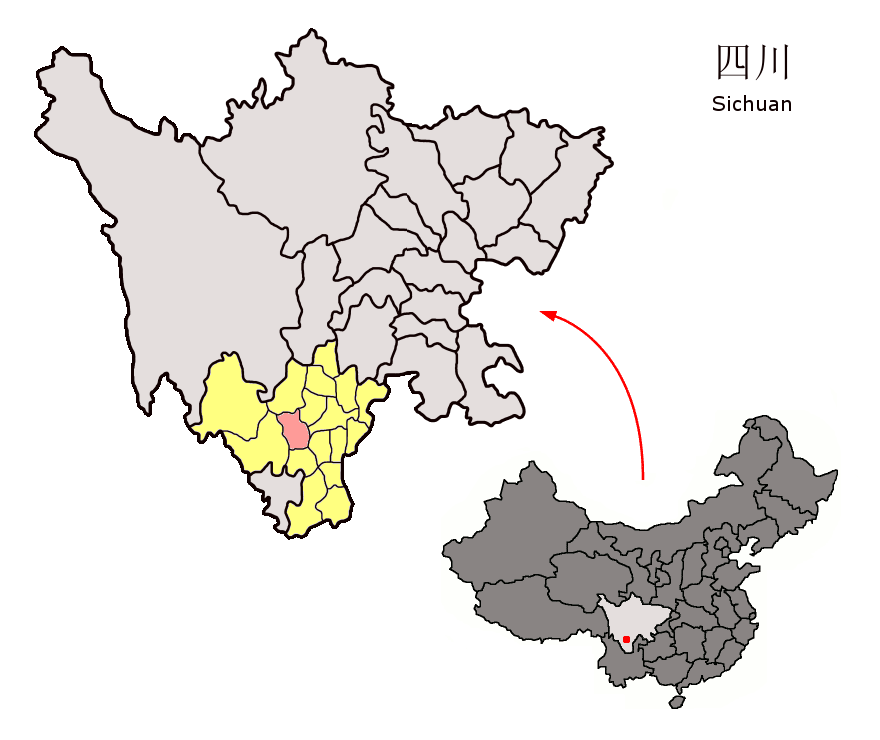
- Location of Xichang City jurisdiction (red) within Liangshan Prefecture (yellow) and Sichuan

- Location in Sichuan Xichang (China)
- Coordinates: 27°53′40″N 102°15′52″E
- Country: China
- Province: Sichuan
- Prefecture: Liangshan
- Municipal seat: Beicheng Subdistrict

Area
  - Total: 2,655 km^{2} (1,025 sq mi)
- Elevation: 1,542 m (5,059 ft)

Population (2020)
  - Total: 955,041
  - Density: 359.7/km^{2} (931.7/sq mi)
- Time zone: UTC+8 (China Standard)
- Postal code: 615000
- Area code: 0834
- Website: www.xichang.gov.cn

Xichang

Chinese name
- Chinese: 西昌
- Literal meaning: Western Prosperity
Transcriptions
Standard Mandarin
- Hanyu Pinyin: Xīchāng

Yi name
- Yi: ꀒꎂ; Romanisation: Op Rro

Former names

Jiandu
- Chinese: 建都
- Literal meaning: Establishing Capital
Transcriptions
Standard Mandarin
- Hanyu Pinyin: Jiàndū
- Wade–Giles: Chien-tu

Jianchang
- Chinese: 建昌
- Literal meaning: Establishing Prosperity
Transcriptions
Standard Mandarin
- Hanyu Pinyin: Jiànchāng
- Wade–Giles: Chien-chʻang

Xichang (Northern Yi: /o̝˨˩dʐo̝˧/) is a city in and the seat of the Liangshan Yi Autonomous Prefecture in the south of Sichuan, China.

== History ==
The Qiongdu were the local people at the time of contact with China. The county of Qiongdu is attested in the area from the Han dynasty. Under the Song dynasty, a local lord was given the title of "King of the Qiongdu" (Qiongdu Wang). The area formed part of the medieval Kingdom of Dali and was subdued by the Mongolians from 1253 to 1256, after which it was incorporated into Yunnan of the Yuan dynasty. It was organized as the Jiandu Ningyuan duhufu, qianhufu, or wanhufu but continued to be often known as Jiandu. In the book of his travels, Marco Polo recorded that the people of Jiandu and its hinterland used no coins but rods of gold bullion reckoned in saggi. A small change was made using half-catty pieces of molded salt, each reckoned as one-eightieth of a saggio of pure gold. Under the Qing, it was officially known as Ningyuan Commandery but also continued to be referenced under the old name Jianchang. In the 19th century, it was the center of Sichuan's production of "white wax".

In 1850, a magnitude-7.5 earthquake killed more than 20,600 people in Xichang. The city walls in Xichang County, three gate towers—the west, south and north—and some prisons collapsed.

Roman Catholicism was introduced to Ningyuan in the 18th century by the Paris Foreign Missions Society. The Apostolic Vicariate of Kienchang was established in 1910 and was elevated to a diocese in 1946. The episcopal residence is located next to the Cathedral of the Angels, Xichang.

In the 1980s, its population was thought to be around 140,000 people. In 2012, it had an estimated population of 481,796.

== Geography ==
Xichang lies in a mountainous region of far southern Sichuan. The city is just northeast of the prefecture-level city of Panzhihua. The Anning River is the main river in the area. It is an affluent of the Yalong, Jinsha, and Yangtze rivers. It lies near Qiong Lake.

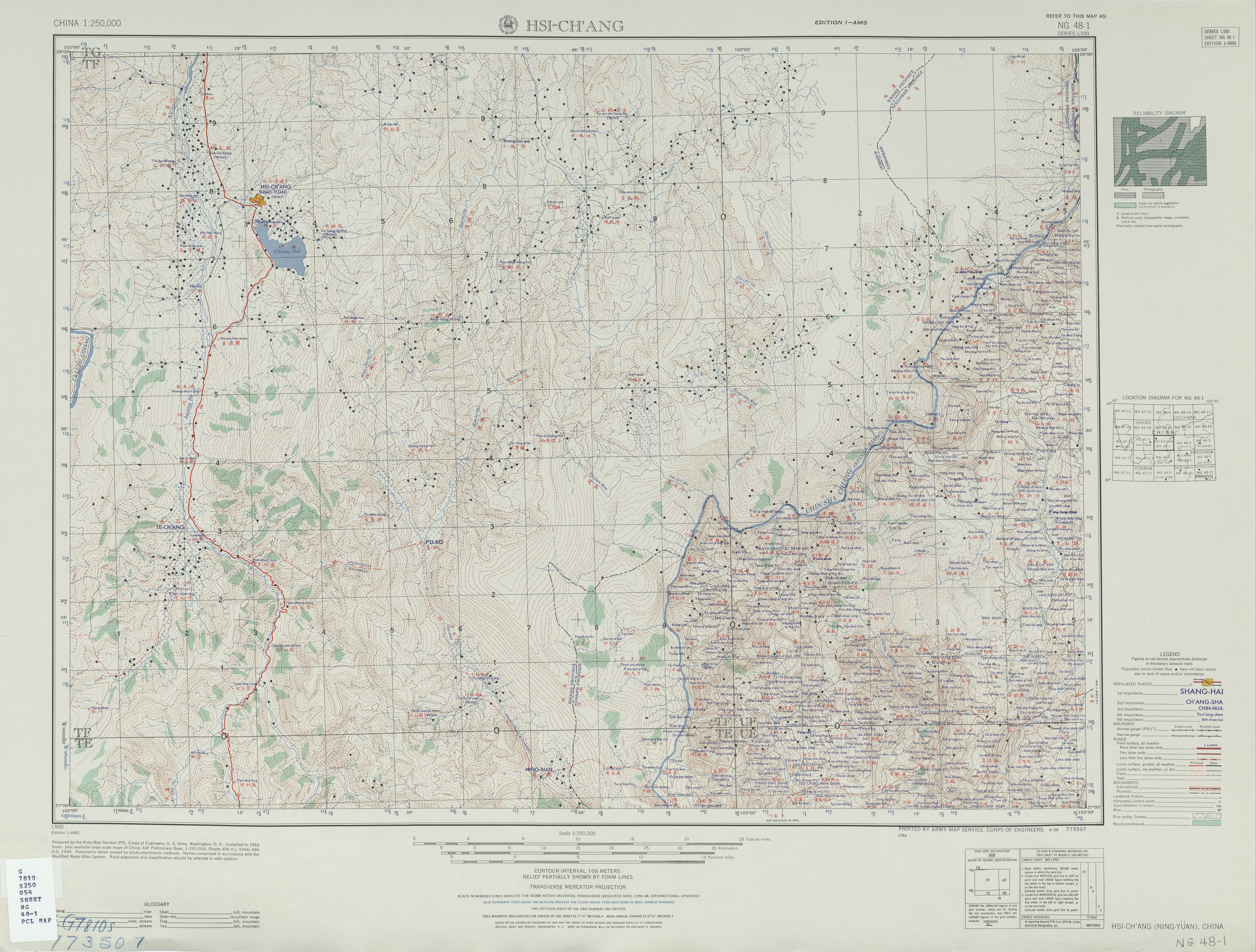
Xichang (labelled as HSI-CH'ANG (NING-YÜAN) 西昌 (寧遠)) (1954)

=== Climate ===
Owing to its low latitude and high elevation, Xichang has a monsoon-influenced humid subtropical climate (Köppen Cwa) milder and far sunnier than the Sichuan Basin, with mild, very sunny and dry winters, and very warm, rainy summers. The monthly 24-hour average temperature ranges from 9.9 °C (49.8 °F) in January to 22.6 °C (72.7 °F) in July, and the annual mean is 17.15 °C (62.9 °F). Over 60% of the 1,025 mm (40.4 in) annual precipitation occurs from June to August. With monthly percent possible sunshine ranging from 36% in September to 72% in January, the city receives 2,367 hours of bright sunshine annually.

Climate data for Xichang, elevation 1,591 m (5,220 ft) (1991–2020 normals, extremes 1951–present)
Month	Jan	Feb	Mar	Apr	May	Jun	Jul	Aug	Sep	Oct	Nov	Dec	Year
Record high °C (°F)	26.0 (78.8)	29.3 (84.7)	33.5 (92.3)	35.5 (95.9)	39.4 (102.9)	36.0 (96.8)	39.7 (103.5)	35.5 (95.9)	34.9 (94.8)	33.2 (91.8)	29.4 (84.9)	24.8 (76.6)	39.7 (103.5)
Mean daily maximum °C (°F)	17.5 (63.5)	20.3 (68.5)	24.6 (76.3)	27.4 (81.3)	28.5 (83.3)	27.7 (81.9)	28.2 (82.8)	28.5 (83.3)	25.8 (78.4)	22.8 (73.0)	20.3 (68.5)	17.1 (62.8)	24.1 (75.3)
Daily mean °C (°F)	10.2 (50.4)	12.8 (55.0)	16.6 (61.9)	19.6 (67.3)	21.5 (70.7)	22.0 (71.6)	22.8 (73.0)	22.6 (72.7)	20.3 (68.5)	17.2 (63.0)	13.6 (56.5)	10.2 (50.4)	17.5 (63.4)
Mean daily minimum °C (°F)	4.8 (40.6)	7.0 (44.6)	10.3 (50.5)	13.4 (56.1)	16.3 (61.3)	18.2 (64.8)	19.1 (66.4)	18.8 (65.8)	16.9 (62.4)	13.8 (56.8)	9.2 (48.6)	5.5 (41.9)	12.8 (55.0)
Record low °C (°F)	−3.4 (25.9)	−3.8 (25.2)	0.2 (32.4)	2.7 (36.9)	7.1 (44.8)	10.7 (51.3)	12.7 (54.9)	13.0 (55.4)	8.9 (48.0)	0.0 (32.0)	−1.8 (28.8)	−2.8 (27.0)	−3.8 (25.2)
Average precipitation mm (inches)	4.6 (0.18)	5.8 (0.23)	13.6 (0.54)	32.3 (1.27)	83.0 (3.27)	234.5 (9.23)	234.8 (9.24)	179.6 (7.07)	163.3 (6.43)	67.5 (2.66)	16.8 (0.66)	5.0 (0.20)	1,040.8 (40.98)
Average precipitation days (≥ 0.1 mm)	2.6	2.9	5.0	8.7	13.0	19.0	17.9	15.9	15.6	11.7	4.2	2.0	118.5
Average snowy days	1.1	1.0	0.1	0	0	0	0	0	0	0	0.1	0.6	2.9
Average relative humidity (%)	49	43	41	45	54	71	74	71	74	71	63	59	60
Mean monthly sunshine hours	221.5	216.7	247.4	235.9	207.2	136.6	142.8	163.5	126.6	142.2	186.0	198.3	2,224.7
Percentage possible sunshine	67	68	66	61	49	33	34	41	35	40	58	62	51
Source: China Meteorological Administration all-time extreme temperature All-time October highall-time November record highextremes

== Administrative divisions ==
Xichang comprises 7 subdistricts, 11 towns, 6 townships and 2 ethnic townships.

Name	Simplified Chinese	Hanyu pinyin	Yi	Romanized Yi	Administrative division code
Subdistricts
Beicheng Subdistrict	北城街道	Běichéng Jiēdào	ꀙꍰꏦꈜ	bip chep jie gga	513401001
Xicheng Subdistrict	西城街道	Xīchéng Jiēdào	ꑟꍰꏦꈜ	xi chep jie gga	513401002
Dongcheng Subdistrict	东城街道	Dōngchéng Jiēdào	ꄏꍰꏦꈜ	do chep jie gga	513401003
Chang'an Subdistrict	长安街道	Cháng'ān Jiēdào	ꍤꉢꏦꈜ	chap nga jie gga	513401004
Xincun Subdistrict	新村街道	Xīncūn Jiēdào	ꑟꋂꏦꈜ	xi ce jie gga	513401005
Hainan Subdistrict	海南街道	Hǎinán Jiēdào	ꉰꇂꏦꈜ	hie lap jie gga	513401007
Madao Subdistrict	马道街道	Mǎdào Jiēdào	ꂶꄐꏦꈜ	max dop jie gga	513401008
Towns
Lizhou Town	礼州镇	Lǐzhōu Zhèn	ꇉꂾꍔ	lo mox zhep	513401101
Anning Town	安宁镇	Ānníng Zhèn	ꉢꆀꍔ	nga nip zhep	513401102
Chuanxing Town	川兴镇	Chuānxīng Zhèn	ꍧꑟꍔ	chuo xi zhep	513401103
Huanglianguang Town	黄联关镇	Huángliánguān Zhèn	ꉸꆃꇨꍔ	huop niep guo zhep	513401104
Youjun Town	佑君镇	Yòujūn Zhèn	ꒀꏢꍔ	yop ji zhep	513401105
Taihe Town	太和镇	Tàihé Zhèn	ꄠꉼꍔ	tiep hop zhep	513401106
Anha Town	安哈镇	Ānhā Zhèn	ꉢꉳꍔ	nga ha zhep	513401107
Aqi Town	阿七镇	Āqī Zhèn	ꀈꐕꍔ	at qyp zhep	513401108
Zhangmuqing Town	樟木箐镇	Zhāngmùqìng Zhèn	ꍈꃆꏿꍔ	zha mup qip zhep	513401109
Langhuan Town	琅环镇	Lánghuán Zhèn	ꇂꉸꍔ	lap huop zhep	513401110
Baru Town	巴汝镇	Bārǔ Zhèn	ꀠꌼꍔ	ba ssut zhep	513401111
Townships
Sihe Township	四合乡	Sìhé Xiāng	ꌧꉼꑣ	syp hop xie	513401203
Kaiyuan Township	开元乡	Kāiyuán Xiāng	ꇽꑸꑣ	kie yiep xie	513401211
Daxing Township	大兴乡	Dàxīng Xiāng	ꄉꑟꑣ	da xi xie	513401212
Jingjiu Township	经久乡	Jīngjiǔ Xiāng	ꏢꏭꑣ	ji jox xie	513401215
Ma'anshan Township	马鞍山乡	Mǎ'ānshān Xiāng	ꂶꉢꎭꑣ	max nga sha xie	513401228
Ethnic townships
Yulong Hui Ethnic Township	裕隆回族乡	Yùlóng Huízú Xiāng	ꒄꇊꉇꉈꑣ	yup lop hxix hxi xie	513401219
Gaocao Hui Ethnic Township	高草回族乡	Gāocǎo Huízú Xiāng	ꇨꊿꉇꉈꑣ	guo co hxix hxi xie	513401220

== Transportation ==
Xichang Railway Station (西昌站) is a main station on the Chengdu–Kunming railway. Construction of a fast express train line has been completed. It connected Panzhihua, Chengdu and Guangyuan. There are also some other stations in the city, including the Xichang North railway station and Xichang South railway station.

The city possesses its own airport, Xichang Qingshan Airport, which is attached to the spaceport by a railroad line and a motorway directly.

Xichang lies on the G5 Beijing–Kunming Expressway.

== Spaceport ==
Xichang's spaceport is located about 64 kilometres (40 mi) northwest of the city and went into operation in 1984. Communications satellites are the most common payload to be inserted into orbit from the Xichang spaceport.
